= 1941 Southeastern Conference football season =

- Sport: Football
- Duration: September 20, 1941 – January 1, 1942
- Teams: 12
- Champion: Mississippi State

SEC seasons
- 1940 1942

1941 Southeastern Conference football standings
	Conf.					Overall
Team		W		L			W		L
No. 16 Mississippi State $	4	–	0	–	1	8	–	1	–	1
No. 18 Tennessee	3	–	1	–	0	8	–	2	–	0
No. 20 Alabama	5	–	2	–	0	9	–	2	–	0
No. 14 Georgia	3	–	1	–	1	9	–	1	–	1
No. 17 Ole Miss	2	–	1	–	1	6	–	2	–	1
Vanderbilt	3	–	2	–	0	8	–	2	–	0
LSU	2	–	2	–	2	4	–	4	–	2
Tulane	2	–	3	–	0	5	–	4	–	0
Georgia Tech	2	–	4	–	0	3	–	6	–	0
Florida	1	–	3	–	0	4	–	6	–	0
Kentucky	0	–	4	–	0	5	–	4	–	0
Auburn	0	–	4	–	1	4	–	5	–	1
$ – Conference champion; Rankings from AP Poll

The 1941 Southeastern Conference football season was the ninth season of college football played by the member schools of the Southeastern Conference (SEC) and was a part of the 1941 college football season. Mississippi State compiled an 8–1–1 overall record, with a conference record of 4–0–1, and was SEC champion. This also marked the first season without Sewanee after they withdrew from the SEC and deemphasized collegiate athletics.

== Results and team statistics ==
Conf. rank	Team	Head coach	Overall record	Conf. record	AP final	PPG	PAG
1	Mississippi State	Allyn McKeen	8–1–1 (.850)	4–0–1 (.900)	No. 16	19.1	5.5
2	Tennessee	John Barnhill	8–2–0 (.800)	3–1–0 (.750)	No. 19	18.2	7.3
3	Alabama	Frank Thomas	9–2–0 (.818)	5–2–0 (.714)	No. 20	23.9	7.7
4	Georgia	Wally Butts	9–1–1 (.864)	3–1–1 (.700)	No. 14	29.0	7.7
5	Ole Miss	Harry Mehre	6–2–1 (.722)	2–1–1 (.625)	No. 17	14.6	7.4
6	Vanderbilt	Red Sanders	8–2–0 (.800)	3–2–0 (.600)		26.0	8.9
7	LSU	Bernie Moore	4–4–2 (.500)	2–2–2 (.500)		11.9	9.3
8	Tulane	Red Dawson	5–4–0 (.556)	2–3–0 (.400)		24.4	10.6
9	Georgia Tech	William Alexander	3–6–0 (.333)	2–4–0 (.333)		9.1	14.4
10	Florida	Tom Lieb	4–6–0 (.400)	1–3–0 (.250)		14.9	9.7
11	Auburn	Jack Meagher	4–5–1 (.450)	0–4–1 (.100)		12.3	11.5
12	Kentucky	Albert D. Kirwan	5–4–0 (.556)	0–4–0 (.000)		16.8	17.1

Key
AP final = Rankings from AP sports writers. See 1941 college football rankings
PPG = Average of points scored per game
PAG = Average of points allowed per game

== Schedule ==
Index to colors and formatting
SEC member won
SEC member lost
SEC member tie
SEC teams in **bold**

=== Week Zero ===
Date	Visiting team	Home team	Site	Result	Attendance	Ref.
September 20	Furman	**Tennessee**	Shields–Watkins Field • Knoxville, TN	**W** 32–6	12,000	
September 20	Louisiana Tech	**LSU**	Tiger Stadium • Baton Rouge, LA	**W** 25–0	10,000	
September 20	Randolph–Macon	**Florida**	Florida Field • Gainesville, FL	**W** 26–0		

=== Week One ===
Date	Visiting team	Home team	Site	Result	Attendance	Ref.
September 26	Howard (AL)	**Auburn**	Cramton Bowl • Montgomery, AL	**W** 13–0	9,000	
September 26	**Ole Miss**	Georgetown	Griffith Stadium • Washington, DC	**L** 6–16	6,000	
September 27	Southwestern Louisiana	**Alabama**	Denny Stadium • Tuscaloosa, AL	**W** 47–6	6,000	
September 27	**Georgia**	Mercer	Porter Field • Macon, GA	**W** 81–0	12,000	
September 27	**Vanderbilt**	Purdue	Ross–Ade Stadium • West Lafayette, IN	**W** 3–0	17,000	
September 27	Boston College	**Tulane**	Tulane Stadium • New Orleans, LA	**W** 21–7	45,000	
September 27	VPI	**Kentucky**	Manual Stadium • Louisville, KY	**W** 37–14	8,000	
September 27	Holy Cross	**LSU**	Tiger Stadium • Baton Rouge, LA	**L** 13–19	25,000	
September 27	**Florida**	**Mississippi State**	Scott Field • Starkville, MS	**MSS** 6–0	13,000	

=== Week Two ===
Date	Visiting team	Home team	Site	Result	Attendance	Ref.
October 4	South Carolina	**Georgia**	Sanford Stadium • Athens, GA (rivalry)	**W** 34–6	17,000	
October 4	Southwestern (TN)	**Ole Miss**	Hemingway Stadium • Oxford, MS	**W** 27–0	4,500	
October 4	Tennessee Tech	**Vanderbilt**	Dudley Field • Nashville, TN	**W** 42–0	8,000	
October 4	Chattanooga	**Georgia Tech**	Grant Field • Atlanta, GA	**W** 20–0	10,000	
October 4	Tampa	**Florida**	Florida Field • Gainesville, FL	**W** 46–6		
October 4	**Kentucky**	Washington & Lee	Wilson Field • Lexington, VA	**W** 7–0	3,000	
October 4	**Tennessee**	Duke	Duke Stadium • Durham, NC	**L** 0–19	45,000	
October 4	**LSU**	Texas	Memorial Stadium • Austin, TX	**L** 0–34	18,000	
October 4	**Mississippi State**	**Alabama**	Denny Stadium • Tuscaloosa, AL (rivalry)	**MSS** 14–0	20,000	
October 4	**Auburn**	**Tulane**	Tulane Stadium • New Orleans, LA (rivalry)	**TUL** 32–0	35,000	

=== Week Three ===
Date	Visiting team	Home team	Site	Result	Attendance	Ref.
October 10	**Ole Miss**	**Georgia**	Sanford Stadium • Athens, GA	**T** 14–14	25,000	
October 11	Dayton	**Tennessee**	Shields–Watkins Field • Knoxville, TN	**W** 26–0	30,000	
October 11	Howard (AL)	**Alabama**	Legion Field • Birmingham, AL	**W** 61–0	6,000	
October 11	Louisiana Tech	**Auburn**	Auburn Stadium • Auburn, AL	**W** 34–0	8,500	
October 11	**Tulane**	Rice	Rice Field • Houston, TX	**L** 9–10	25,000	
October 11	Notre Dame	**Georgia Tech**	Grant Field • Atlanta, GA	**L** 0–20	31,000	
October 11	Villanova	**Florida**	Florida Field • Gainesville, FL	**L** 0–6	> 20,000	
October 11	**Mississippi State**	**LSU**	Tiger Stadium • Baton Rouge, LA (rivalry)	**T** 0–0	30,000	
October 11	**Vanderbilt**	**Kentucky**	McLean Stadium • Lexington, KY (rivalry)	**VAN** 39–15	11,000	

=== Week Four ===
Date	Visiting team	Home team	Site	Result	Attendance	Ref.
October 18	**Georgia**	No. 20 Columbia	Baker Field • New York, NY	**W** 7–3	27,000	
October 18	**Ole Miss**	Holy Cross	Fitton Field • Worcester, MA	**W** 21–0	22,000	
October 18	Rice	**LSU**	Tiger Stadium • Baton Rouge, LA	**W** 27–0	25,000	
October 18	North Carolina	No. 17 **Tulane**	Tulane Stadium • New Orleans, LA	**W** 52–6	33,000	
October 18	**Kentucky**	Xavier	Xavier Stadium • Cincinnati, OH	**W** 21–6	11,000	
October 18	**Florida**	Maryland	Byrd Stadium • College Park, MD	**L** 12–13	7,500	
October 18	SMU	**Auburn**	Legion Field • Birmingham, AL	**L** 7–20	12,000	
October 18	No. 4 **Alabama**	**Tennessee**	Shields–Watkins Field • Knoxville, TN (rivalry)	**ALA** 9–2	37,000	
October 18	**Georgia Tech**	No. 18 **Vanderbilt**	Dudley Field • Nashville, TN (rivalry)	**VAN** 14–7	15,000	
^{#}Rankings from AP Poll released prior to game.

=== Week Five ===
Date	Visiting team	Home team	Site	Result	Attendance	Ref.
October 25	Union (TN)	**Mississippi State**	Scott Field • Starkville, MS	**W** 56–7	14,000	
October 25	Cincinnati	**Tennessee**	Shields–Watkins Field • Knoxville, TN	**W** 21–6	7,000	
October 25	Princeton	No. 15 **Vanderbilt**	Dudley Field • Nashville, TN	**W** 46–7	14,000	
October 25	West Virginia	**Kentucky**	McLean Stadium • Lexington, KY	**W** 18–6	7,000	
October 25	**Georgia**	**Alabama**	Legion Field • Birmingham, AL (rivalry)	**ALA** 27–14	23,000	
October 25	**Ole Miss**	No. 10 **Tulane**	Tulane Stadium • New Orleans, LA (rivalry)	**OM** 20–13	45,000	
October 25	**Florida**	**LSU**	Tiger Stadium • Baton Rouge, LA (rivalry)	**LSU** 10–7	20,000	
October 25	**Auburn**	**Georgia Tech**	Grant Field • Atlanta, GA (rivalry)	**GT** 28–14	20,000	
^{#}Rankings from AP Poll released prior to game.

=== Week Six ===
Date	Visiting team	Home team	Site	Result	Attendance	Ref.
November 1	No. 17 **Mississippi State**	Southwestern (TN)	Crump Stadium • Memphis, TN	**W** 20–6		
November 1	No. 17 **Ole Miss**	Marquette	Marquette Stadium • Milwaukee, WI	**W** 12–6	7,500	
November 1	No. 4 Duke	**Georgia Tech**	Grant Field • Atlanta, GA	**L** 0–14	28,000	
November 1	**Tennessee**	**LSU**	Tiger Stadium • Baton Rouge, LA	**TEN** 13–6	30,000	
November 1	**Kentucky**	No. 15 **Alabama**	Denny Stadium • Tuscaloosa, AL	**ALA** 30–0	11,000	
November 1	**Auburn**	**Georgia**	Memorial Stadium • Columbus, GA (rivalry)	**UGA** 7–0	17,000	
November 1	**Tulane**	No. 10 **Vanderbilt**	Dudley Field • Nashville, TN	**TUL** 34–14	22,000	
^{#}Rankings from AP Poll released prior to game.

=== Week Seven ===
Date	Visiting team	Home team	Site	Result	Attendance	Ref.
November 8	Howard (AL)	**Tennessee**	Shields–Watkins Field • Knoxville, TN	**W** 28–6	4,000	
November 8	Sewanee	**Vanderbilt**	Dudley Field • Nashville, TN (rivalry)	**W** 20–0	5,000	
November 8	No. 15 **Mississippi State**	**Auburn**	Legion Field • Birmingham, AL	**MSS** 14–7	11,000	
November 8	No. 13 **Alabama**	No. 14 **Tulane**	Tulane Stadium • New Orleans, LA	**ALA** 19–14	50,000	
November 8	**Florida**	**Georgia**	Municipal Stadium • Jacksonville, FL (rivalry)	**UGA** 19–3	21,000	
November 8	No. 16 **Ole Miss**	**LSU**	Tiger Stadium • Baton Rouge, LA (rivalry)	**OM** 13–12	28,000	
November 8	**Kentucky**	**Georgia Tech**	Grant Field • Atlanta, GA	**GT** 20–13	15,000	
^{#}Rankings from AP Poll released prior to game.

=== Week Eight ===
Date	Visiting team	Home team	Site	Result	Attendance	Ref.
November 15	**Tennessee**	No. 18 Boston College	Alumni Field • Chestnut Hill, MA	**W** 14–7	32,000	
November 15	Centre	**Georgia**	Ponce de Leon Park • Atlanta, GA	**W** 47–6	5,000	
November 15	**Tulane**	NYU	Yankee Stadium • Bronx, NY	**W** 45–0	10,000	
November 15	**Florida**	Miami (FL)	Burdine Stadium • Miami, FL (rivalry)	**W** 14–0	31,731	
November 15	Southwestern (TN)	**Kentucky**	McLean Stadium • Lexington, KY	**W** 33–19	8,000	
November 15	No. 13 **Mississippi State**	No. 10 Duquesne	Forbes Field • Pittsburgh, PA	**L** 0–16	31,483	
November 15	**Georgia Tech**	No. 9 **Alabama**	Legion Field • Birmingham, AL (rivalry)	**ALA** 20–0	25,000	
November 15	**Auburn**	**LSU**	Tiger Stadium • Baton Rouge, LA (rivalry)	**T** 7–7		
November 16	**Vanderbilt**	Louisville	duPont Manual Stadium • Louisville, KY	**W** 68–0	4,000	
^{#}Rankings from AP Poll released prior to game.

=== Week Nine ===
Date	Visiting team	Home team	Site	Result	Attendance	Ref.
November 22	Millsaps	**Mississippi State**	Scott Field • Starkville, MS	**W** 49–6		
November 22	Dartmouth	No. 20 **Georgia**	Sanford Stadium • Athens, GA	**W** 35–0	> 18,000	
November 22	Arkansas	No. 15 **Ole Miss**	Crump Stadium • Memphis, TN (rivalry)	**W** 18–0	10,000	
November 22	**Auburn**	Villanova	Shibe Park • Philadelphia, PA	**W** 13–0	12,000	
November 22	**Tennessee**	**Kentucky**	McLean Stadium • Lexington, KY (rivalry)	**TEN** 20–7	14,000	
November 22	No. 7 **Alabama**	**Vanderbilt**	Dudley Field • Nashville, TN	**VAN** 7–0	12,000	
November 22	**Georgia Tech**	**Florida**	Florida Field • Gainesville, FL	**FLA** 14–7	15,000	
^{#}Rankings from AP Poll released prior to game.

=== Week Ten ===
Date	Visiting team	Home team	Site	Result	Attendance	Ref.
November 28	No. 18 **Alabama**	Miami (FL)	Burdine Stadium • Miami, FL	**W** 21–7	26,000	
November 28	No. 16 Clemson	**Auburn**	Auburn Stadium • Auburn, AL (rivalry)	**W** 28–7	12,000	
November 29	No. 14 **Mississippi State**	**Ole Miss**	Hemingway Stadium • Oxford, MS (rivalry)	**MSS** 6–0	28,000	
November 29	No. 12 **Vanderbilt**	**Tennessee**	Shields–Watkins Field • Knoxville, TN (rivalry)	**TEN** 26–7	30,000	
November 29	No. 20 **Georgia**	**Georgia Tech**	Grant Field • Atlanta, GA (rivalry)	**UGA** 21–0	31,000	
November 29	**LSU**	**Tulane**	Tulane Stadium • New Orleans, LA (rivalry)	**LSU** 19–0	50,764	
^{#}Rankings from AP Poll released prior to game.

=== Week Eleven ===
Date	Visiting team	Home team	Site	Result	Attendance	Ref.
December 6	No. 16 **Mississippi State**	San Francisco	Kezar Stadium • San Francisco, CA	**W** 26–13	25,000	
December 20	UCLA	**Florida**	Fairfield Stadium • Jacksonville, FL	**L** 27–30	8,000	
^{#}Rankings from AP Poll released prior to game.

=== Postseason ===
Date	Visiting team	Home team	Site	Result	Attendance	Ref.
January 1, 1942	No. 20 **Alabama**	No. 9 Texas A&M	Cotton Bowl • Dallas, TX (Cotton Bowl Classic)	**W** 29–21	38,000	
January 1, 1942	TCU	No. 14 **Georgia**	Burdine Stadium • Miami, FL (Orange Bowl)	**W** 40–26	38,000	
^{#}Rankings from AP Poll released prior to game.

== All-conference players ==
The following players were recognized as consensus first-team honors from the Associated Press (AP) and United Press (UP) on the 1941 All-SEC football team:

- Holt Rast, End, Alabama (AP-1, UP-1)
- Ernie Blandin, Tackle, Tulane (AP-1, UP-1)
- Homer "Larry" Hazel Jr., Guard, Ole Miss (AP-1, UP-1)
- John Wyhonic, Guard, Alabama (AP-1, UP-1)
- Bob Gude, Center, Vanderbilt (AP-1, UP-1)
- Jimmy Nelson, Halfback, Alabama (AP-1, UP-1)
- Frank Sinkwich, Halfback, Georgia (AP-1, UP-1)
- Jack Jenkins, Fullback, Vanderbilt (AP-1, UP-1)

== All-Americans ==
Three SEC players were consensus first-team picks on the 1941 College Football All-America Team:

- Holt Rast, End, Alebama (AAB, INS, LIB, SN, NW, UP)
- Ernie Blandin, Tackle, Tulane (CO, LIB, NEA, NW, UP)
- Frank Sinkwich, Halfback, Georgia (AAB, AP, LIB, SN, UP)

Other SEC players receiving All-American honors from at least one selector were:

- John Wyhonic, Tackle, Alabama (LIFE-3)
- Bob Gude, Center, Vanderbilt (CP-3)
- Jimmy Nelson, Halfback, Alabama (AP-3; NEA-3; CP-3)
- Jack Jenkins, Halfback, Vanderbilt (AP-3)
- Merle Hapes, Fullback, Ole Miss (NEA-2)

== Head coaches ==
Records through the completion of the 1941 season

Team	Head coach	Years at school	Overall record	Record at school	SEC record
Alabama	Frank Thomas	11	111–24–6 (.809)	85–15–5 (.833)	42–10–4 (.786)
Auburn	Jack Meagher	8	68–59–4 (.534)	42–33–9 (.554)	23–22–7 (.510)
Florida	Tom Lieb	2	56–44–4 (.558)	9–11–0 (.450)	3–6–0 (.333)
Georgia	Wally Butts	3	19–11–2 (.625)	19–11–2 (.625)	5–4–2 (.545)
Georgia Tech	William Alexander	22	109–87–15 (.552)	109–87–15 (.552)	22–30–5 (.430)
Kentucky	Albert D. Kirwan	4	18–16–3 (.527)	18–16–3 (.527)	3–12–3 (.250)
LSU	Bernie Moore	7	59–34–6 (.626)	47–22–3 (.674)	24–15–2 (.610)
Mississippi State	Allyn McKeen	3	39–9–2 (.800)	26–3–2 (.871)	11–2–2 (.800)
Ole Miss	Harry Mehre	4	90–42–7 (.673)	31–8–1 (.788)	22–18–3 (.547)
Tennessee	John Barnhill	1	8–2–0 (.800)	8–2–0 (.800)	3–1–0 (.750)
Tulane	Red Dawson	6	36–19–4 (.644)	36–19–4 (.644)	16–13–3 (.547)
Vanderbilt	Red Sanders	2	11–8–1 (.575)	11–8–1 (.575)	4–7–1 (.375)

== 1942 NFL draft ==
The following SEC players were selected in the 1942 NFL draft:

Round	Overall pick	Player name	School	Position	NFL team
1	8	Merle Hapes	Ole Miss	Fullback	New York Giants
2	14	Lloyd Cheatham	Auburn	Back	Chicago Cardinals
3	21	Rufus Deal	Auburn	Back	Washington Redskins
5	33	Ernie Blandin	Tulane	Tackle	Philadelphia Eagles
6	46	Harley McCollum	Tulane	Tackle	Washington Redskins
6	48	Bob Glass	Tulane	Back	New York Giants
7	51	John Butler	Tennessee	Back	Pittsburgh Steelers
9	73	Ray Graves	Tennessee	Center	Philadelphia Eagles
9	79	Noah Langdale	Alabama	Tackle	Green Bay Packers
10	90	Noah Mullins	Kentucky	Back	Chicago Bears
12	107	Jim Thibaut	Tulane	Back	Brooklyn Dodgers
14	122	Tom Greene	Georgia	Tackle	Cleveland Rams
14	123	John Wyhonic	Alabama	Guard	Philadelphia Eagles
14	130	Bob Gude	Vanderbilt	Center	Chicago Bears
15	132	Ike Peel	Tennessee	Back	Cleveland Rams
17	160	Don Edmiston	Tennessee	Tackle	Chicago Bears
18	168	Junie Hovious	Ole Miss	Back	New York Giants
18	170	Holt Rast	Alabama	End	Chicago Bears
19	174	Jimmy Nelson	Alabama	Back	Chicago Cardinals
22	198	Milt Hull	Florida	Tackle	New York Giants
