= 1941–42 NCAA football bowl games =

College football postseason game series

- Season: 1941
- Number of bowls: 5
- All-star games: Blue–Gray Football Classic; East–West Shrine Game
- Bowl games: January 1, 1942
- Champions: Minnesota (AP, consensus)
Bowl record by conference
Conference	Bowls	Record	Number of teams in final AP poll
SEC	2	2–0 (1.000)	5
SWC	2	0–2 (0.000)	2
Independent	1	1–0 (1.000)	4
Missouri Valley	1	1–0 (1.000)	0
PCC	1	1–0 (1.000)	2
Big Six	1	0–1 (0.000)	1
Border	1	0–1 (0.000)	0
Southern	1	0–1 (0.000)	1
Big Ten	0	0–0 (–)	4
Ivy League	0	0–0 (–)	1

The 1941–42 NCAA football bowl games were the final games of the National Collegiate Athletic Association (NCAA) 1941 college football season and featured five bowl games, each of which had been held the previous season. All five bowls were played on January 1, 1942. Minnesota was the consensus selection for the national championship, according to recognized selectors.

== Poll rankings ==
The below table lists top teams (per the AP poll taken after the completion of the regular season), their win–loss records (prior to bowl games), and the bowls they later played in.

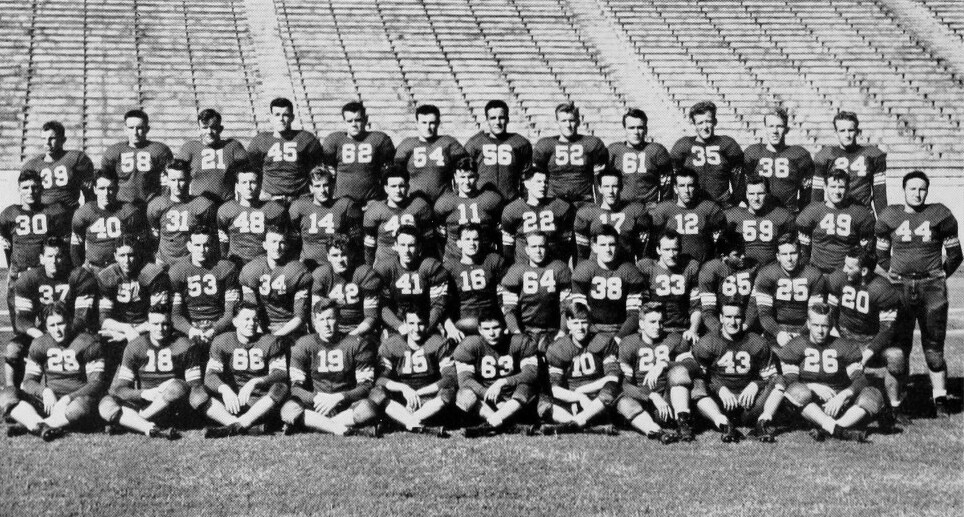
Team photo of the Duke Blue Devils, who competed in the Rose Bowl

AP	Team	W–L	Conf.	Bowl
1	Minnesota Golden Gophers	8–0	Big Ten	— †
2	Duke Blue Devils	9–0	Southern	Rose Bowl
3	Notre Dame Fighting Irish	8–0–1	Ind.	—
4	Texas Longhorns	7–1–1	SWC	—
5	Michigan Wolverines	6–1–1	Big Ten	— †
6	Fordham Rams	7–1	Ind.	Sugar Bowl
7	Missouri Tigers	8–1	Big Six	Sugar Bowl
8	Duquesne Dukes	8–0	Ind.	—
9	Texas A&M Aggies	8–1	SWC	Cotton Bowl Classic
10	Navy Midshipmen	7–1–1	Ind.	—
11	Northwestern Wildcats	5–3	Big Ten	— †
12	Oregon State Beavers	7–2	PCC	Rose Bowl
13	Ohio State	6–1–1	Big Ten	— †
14	Georgia Bulldogs	8–1–1	SEC	Orange Bowl
15	Penn Quakers	7–1	Ivy League	—
16	Mississippi State Maroons	7–1–1	SEC	—
17	Ole Miss Rebels	6–2–1	SEC	—
18	Tennessee Volunteers	8–2	SEC	—
19	Washington State Cougars	6–3	PCC	—
20	Alabama Crimson Tide	8–2	SEC	Cotton Bowl Classic

† The Big Ten Conference did not allow its members to participate in bowl games until the 1947 Rose Bowl.

== Bowl schedule ==
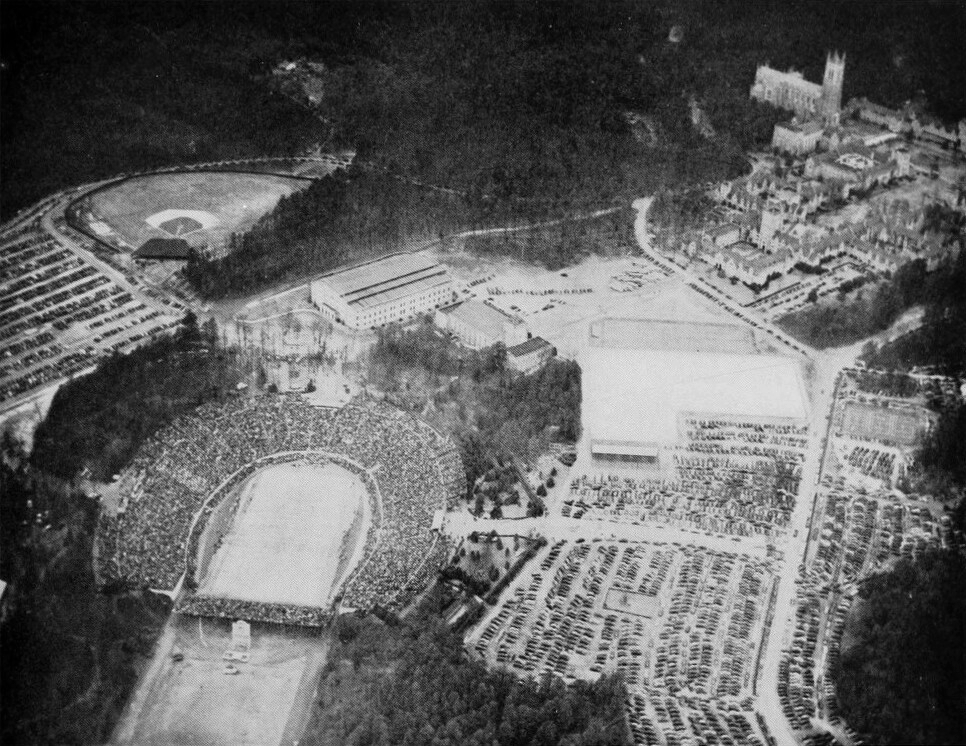
An aerial view of the 1942 Rose Bowl

The Rose Bowl Game, traditionally held at the Rose Bowl in Pasadena, California, was moved to Durham, North Carolina, due to fears about an attack by the Empire of Japan on the West Coast of the United States following the attack on Pearl Harbor on December 7, 1941. The federal government prohibited large public gatherings on the West Coast for the duration of World War II; the first significant canceled event was the Rose Bowl Game scheduled for New Year's Day, 1942.

Date	Game	Site	Teams	Affiliations	Results
Jan. 1	Rose Bowl	Duke Stadium; Durham, North Carolina	#12 Oregon State Beavers (7–2) #2 Duke Blue Devils (9–0)	PCC; Southern	Oregon State 20; Duke 16
Jan. 1	Sugar Bowl	Tulane Stadium; New Orleans, Louisiana	#6 Fordham Rams (7–1) #7 Missouri Tigers (8–1)	Independent; Big Six	Fordham 2 Missouri 0
Jan. 1	Orange Bowl	Burdine Stadium; Miami, Florida	#14 Georgia Bulldogs (8–1–1); TCU Horned Frogs (7–2–1)	SEC; SWC	Georgia 40; TCU 26
Jan. 1	Sun Bowl	Kidd Field; El Paso, Texas	Tulsa Golden Hurricane (7–2); Texas Tech Red Raiders (9–1)	Missouri Valley; Border	Tulsa 6 Texas Tech 0
Jan. 1	Cotton Bowl Classic	Cotton Bowl; Dallas, Texas	#20 Alabama Crimson Tide (8–2) #9 Texas A&M Aggies (7–1)	SEC; SWC	Alabama 29; Texas A&M 21

=== Conference performance in bowl games ===
Conference	Games	Record			Bowls	
Conference	Games	W	L	Pct.	Won	Lost
SEC	2	2	0	1.000	Cotton, Orange	—
SWC	2	0	2	.000	—	Cotton, Orange
Independents	1	1	0	1.000	Sugar	—
Missouri Valley	1	1	0	1.000	Sun	—
Pacific Coast	1	1	0	1.000	Rose	—
Big Six	1	0	1	.000	—	Sugar
Border	1	0	1	.000	—	Sun
Southern	1	0	1	.000	—	Rose

== See also ==
- Prairie View Bowl
- Vulcan Bowl
