= 1941 Ole Miss Rebels football team =

American college football season

1941 Ole Miss Rebels football
- Conference: Southeastern Conference

Ranking
- AP: No. 17
- Record: 6–2–1 (2–1–1 SEC)
- Head coach: Harry Mehre (4th season)
- Captains: J. W. "Wobble" Davidson; Homer Larry Hazel
- Home stadium: Hemingway Stadium

1941 Southeastern Conference football standings
	Conf.					Overall
Team		W		L			W		L
No. 16 Mississippi State $	4	–	0	–	1	8	–	1	–	1
No. 18 Tennessee	3	–	1	–	0	8	–	2	–	0
No. 20 Alabama	5	–	2	–	0	9	–	2	–	0
No. 14 Georgia	3	–	1	–	1	9	–	1	–	1
No. 17 Ole Miss	2	–	1	–	1	6	–	2	–	1
Vanderbilt	3	–	2	–	0	8	–	2	–	0
LSU	2	–	2	–	2	4	–	4	–	2
Tulane	2	–	3	–	0	5	–	4	–	0
Georgia Tech	2	–	4	–	0	3	–	6	–	0
Florida	1	–	3	–	0	4	–	6	–	0
Kentucky	0	–	4	–	0	5	–	4	–	0
Auburn	0	–	4	–	1	4	–	5	–	1
$ – Conference champion; Rankings from AP Poll

The 1941 Ole Miss Rebels football team was an American football team that represented the University of Mississippi in the Southeastern Conference (SEC) during the 1941 college football season. In their fourth season under head coach Harry Mehre, the Rebels compiled a 6–2–1 record (2–1–1 against SEC opponents), outscored opponents by a total of 131 to 67, finished fifth in the conference, and were ranked No. 17 in the final AP Poll. The Rebels played their home games at Hemingway Stadium in Oxford, Mississippi. Ole Miss was ranked in the final AP Poll for the first time in school history.

J.W. "Wobble" Davidson and guard Homer "Larry" Hazel Jr. were the team captains. Six Ole Miss players were selected by the Associated Press (AP) or United Press (UP) for the 1941 All-SEC football team: Hazel (AP-1, UP-1); halfback Merle Hapes (AP-1); tackle Bill Eubanks (AP-1); halfback Junie Hovious (AP-2); guard Oscar Britt (AP-2); and tackle Chet Kozel (AP-3).

== Schedule ==
Date	Opponent	Rank	Site	Result	Attendance	Source
September 26	at Georgetown*		Griffith Stadium; Washington, DC	L 6–16		
October 4	Southwestern (TN)*^{†}		Hemingway Stadium; Oxford, MS	W 27–0	4,500	
October 10	at Georgia		Sanford Stadium; Athens, GA	T 14–14	25,000	
October 18	at Holy Cross*		Fitton Field; Worcester, MA	W 21–0	22,000	
October 25	at No. 10 Tulane		Tulane Stadium; New Orleans, LA (rivalry)	W 20–13	45,000	
November 1	at Marquette*	No. 17	Marquette Stadium; Milwaukee, WI	W 12–6	7,500	
November 8	at LSU	No. 16	Tiger Stadium; Baton Rouge, LA (rivalry)	W 13–12	28,000	
November 22	vs. Arkansas*	No. 15	Crump Stadium; Memphis, TN (rivalry)	W 18–0	10,000	
November 29	Mississippi State	No. 14	Hemingway Stadium; Oxford, MS (Egg Bowl)	L 0–6	28,000	
*Non-conference game; ^{†}Homecoming; Rankings from AP Poll released prior to the game

== Rankings ==
Ranking movements Legend: ██ Increase in ranking ██ Decrease in ranking — = Not ranked т = Tied with team above or below ( ) = First-place votes
	Week							
Poll	1	2	3	4	5	6	7	Final
AP	—	—	17т	16	15 (0.5)	15	14	17

== Roster ==
- E Ray Poole
