= 1941 Alabama Crimson Tide football team =

American college football season

1941 Alabama Crimson Tide football

National champion (Houlgate) Cotton Bowl champion

Cotton Bowl Classic, W 29–21 vs. Texas A&M
- Conference: Southeastern Conference

Ranking
- AP: No. 20
- Record: 9–2 (5–2 SEC)
- Head coach: Frank Thomas (11th season)
- Captain: John Wyhonic
- Home stadium: Denny Stadium; Legion Field

1941 Southeastern Conference football standings
	Conf.					Overall
Team		W		L			W		L
No. 16 Mississippi State $	4	–	0	–	1	8	–	1	–	1
No. 18 Tennessee	3	–	1	–	0	8	–	2	–	0
No. 20 Alabama	5	–	2	–	0	9	–	2	–	0
No. 14 Georgia	3	–	1	–	1	9	–	1	–	1
No. 17 Ole Miss	2	–	1	–	1	6	–	2	–	1
Vanderbilt	3	–	2	–	0	8	–	2	–	0
LSU	2	–	2	–	2	4	–	4	–	2
Tulane	2	–	3	–	0	5	–	4	–	0
Georgia Tech	2	–	4	–	0	3	–	6	–	0
Florida	1	–	3	–	0	4	–	6	–	0
Kentucky	0	–	4	–	0	5	–	4	–	0
Auburn	0	–	4	–	1	4	–	5	–	1
$ – Conference champion; Rankings from AP Poll

The 1941 Alabama Crimson Tide football team (variously "Alabama", "UA" or "Bama") represented the University of Alabama in the 1941 college football season. It was the Crimson Tide's 48th overall and 9th season as a member of the Southeastern Conference (SEC). The team was led by head coach Frank Thomas, in his 11th year, and played their home games at Denny Stadium in Tuscaloosa and Legion Field in Birmingham, Alabama. They finished the season with a record of nine wins and two losses (9–2 overall, 5–2 in the SEC) and with a victory in the Cotton Bowl Classic over Texas A&M. Alabama also claims a share of the 1941 national championship due to its selection as national champion by the Houlgate System.

The Crimson Tide opened the 1941 season with a non-conference victory over Southwestern Louisiana but lost to Mississippi State in the second game of the season. Alabama rebounded with six consecutive victories over Howard, Tennessee, Georgia, Kentucky, Tulane and Georgia Tech. As they entered their game against Vanderbilt, the Crimson Tide was ranked No. 7 in the AP Poll, but were upset 7–0 in Nashville. Alabama then closed the regular season with a road victory over Miami and defeated Texas A&M in the Cotton Bowl Classic. Alabama was ranked at No. 6 (out of 681 teams) in the final rankings under the Litkenhous Difference by Score System for 1941.

== Schedule ==
Date	Opponent	Rank	Site	Result	Attendance
September 27	Southwestern Louisiana*		Denny Stadium; Tuscaloosa, AL	W 47–6	6,000
October 4	Mississippi State		Denny Stadium; Tuscaloosa, AL (rivalry)	L 0–14	18,000
October 11	Howard (AL)*		Legion Field; Birmingham, AL	W 61–0	6,000
October 18	at Tennessee		Shields-Watkins Field; Knoxville, TN (Third Saturday in October)	W 9–2	35,000
October 25	Georgia		Legion Field; Birmingham, AL (rivalry)	W 27–14	23,000
November 1	Kentucky^{†}	No. 15	Denny Stadium; Tuscaloosa, AL	W 30–0	11,000
November 8	at No. 14 Tulane	No. 13	Tulane Stadium; New Orleans, LA	W 19–14	50,000
November 15	Georgia Tech	No. 9	Legion Field; Birmingham, AL (rivalry)	W 20–0	25,000
November 22	at Vanderbilt	No. 7	Dudley Field; Nashville, TN	L 0–7	12,000
November 28	at Miami (FL)*	No. 18	Burdine Stadium; Miami, FL	W 21–7	26,000
January 1, 1942	vs. No. 9 Texas A&M*	No. 20	Cotton Bowl; Dallas, TX (Cotton Bowl Classic)	W 29–21	38,000
*Non-conference game; ^{†}Homecoming; Rankings from AP Poll released prior to the game; Source:

== Rankings ==
Ranking movements Legend: ██ Increase in ranking ██ Decrease in ranking — = Not ranked
	Week							
Poll	1	2	3	4	5	6	7	Final
AP	—	—	15	13	9	7	18	20

== Game summaries ==
=== Southwestern Louisiana ===
Team	1	2	3	4	Total
SW Louisiana	0	6	0	0	6
• Alabama	13	7	14	13	47

- Date: September 27
- Location: Denny Stadium
  Tuscaloosa, AL
- Game attendance: 6,000

To open the 1941 season, Alabama defeated the Southwestern Louisiana Institute Bulldogs (now known as the Louisiana–Lafayette Ragin' Cajuns) 47–6 at Denny Stadium. Alabama took a 13–0 first quarter lead after touchdowns were scored on a short Paul Spencer run and on a 9-yard Jimmy Nelson run. The Bulldogs then responded early in the second quarter with their only points on an 11-yard Bobby Voitier touchdown pass to William Bernhard. The Crimson Tide then played their second line and Don Salls scored their third touchdown of the afternoon on a 6-yard run to give Alabama a 20–6 halftime lead. In the second half, Louisiana was shut out and the Crimson Tide added two touchdowns in each of the final two quarters for the 47–6 win. Third-quarter touchdowns were scored by Dave Brown on a 6-yard run and by Spencer on a 7-yard run; fourth-quarter touchdowns were scored after Wheeler Leeth blocked a Bulldogs punt that was returned 15-yards by Joe Chorba and on a short Louie Scales run. The victory was Alabama's first against the Bulldogs and also marked the return of former Crimson Tide All-American Johnny Cain to Tuscaloosa as head coach of Southwestern Louisiana.

=== Mississippi State ===
Team	1	2	3	4	Total
• Mississippi State	0	0	7	7	14
Alabama	0	0	0	0	0

- Date: October 4
- Location: Denny Stadium
  Tuscaloosa, AL
- Game attendance: 18,000

In the first conference game of the season, Alabama was shut out 14–0 by the Mississippi State Maroons on homecoming at Denny Stadium for the second consecutive year. After a scoreless first half, the Maroons scored a touchdown in each of the final two quarters. Touchdowns were scored on a 19-yard Bill Murphy pass to Robert Patterson in the third and on a short Bruce run in the fourth.

=== Howard (AL) ===
Team	1	2	3	4	Total
Howard	0	0	0	0	0
• Alabama	6	7	14	34	61

- Date: October 11
- Location: Legion Field
  Birmingham, AL
- Game attendance: 6,000

In the first Legion Field game of the season, Alabama defeated Howard (now Samford University) 61–0. The Crimson Tide took a 13–0 halftime lead after touchdowns were scored on a 1-yard Don Salls run in the first and on an 8-yard reverse by Dave Brown in the second. Alabama extended their lead further to 27–0 in the third with touchdowns by Jimmy Nelson on a 95-yard kickoff return and then on a 13-yard run. The Crimson Tide then closed the game with five fourth-quarter touchdowns for the 61–0 win. Touchdowns in the fourth were scored by Carl Mims on runs of 26, 6 and 18-yards, Ted McKosky on a 37-yard run and on a Ted Cook touchdown reception.

=== Tennessee ===
Third Saturday in October

Team	1	2	3	4	Total
• Alabama	3	6	0	0	9
Tennessee	0	0	2	0	2

- Date: October 18
- Location: Shields-Watkins Field
  Knoxville, TN
- Game attendance: 35,000

At Knoxville, Alabama defeated rival Tennessee 9–2 to end a three-game losing streak against the Volunteers. Alabama scored all of their points in the first half for a 9–0 lead on a 21-yard George Hecht field goal in the first and on a 2-yard Don Salls touchdown run in the second. Tennessee scored their only points in the third quarter on a safety to prevent a shutout. Jimmy Nelson starred on defense with his three interceptions during the game.

=== Georgia ===
Team	1	2	3	4	Total
Georgia	0	7	0	7	14
• Alabama	13	7	7	0	27

- Date: October 25
- Location: Legion Field
  Birmingham, AL
- Game attendance: 23,000

At Legion Field, Alabama defeated the Georgia Bulldogs 27–14 in what was their first meeting since the 1935 season. The Crimson Tide took a 13–0 first quarter lead on a Jimmy Nelson touchdown pass to Holt Rast and on a 1-yard Nelson run. The Bulldogs responded in the first two minutes of the second quarter with a Heyward Allen to Lamar Davis touchdown pass. However, Alabama responded to make the halftime lead 20–7 after Paul Spencer scored on a 1-yard run late in the second quarter. Alabama then scored their final points late in the third when Nelson intercepted a Frank Sinkwich pass and returned it 54 yards for a 27–7 lead. A late Allen to Jerry Nunnally touchdown pass made the final score 27–14.

=== Kentucky ===
Team	1	2	3	4	Total
Kentucky	0	0	0	0	0
• #15 Alabama	6	6	6	12	30

- Date: November 1
- Location: Denny Stadium
  Tuscaloosa, AL
- Game attendance: 11,000

After their victory over Georgia, Alabama entered the polls for the first time of the season at the No. 15 position. On what was homecoming in Tuscaloosa, the Crimson Tide shutout Kentucky 30–0, and scored at least one touchdown in all four quarters. First half touchdowns were scored by Jimmy Nelson on a 20-yard run in the first and on a 22-yard pass from Russ Mosley to George Weeks in the second. Second half touchdowns were scored on a Nelson to Holt Rast reception in the third and on both a 25-yard Howard Hughes to Carl Mims pass and on a 23-yard Frank Martin run.

=== Tulane ===
Team	1	2	3	4	Total
• #13 Alabama	6	0	7	6	19
#14 Tulane	7	7	0	0	14

- Date: November 8
- Location: Tulane Stadium
  New Orleans, LA
- Game attendance: 50,000

The Crimson Tide defeated the Green Wave 19–14 with a fourth-quarter touchdown to take the lead before a crowd of 50,000 at Tulane Stadium. Alabama scored first when Jimmy Nelson took a Bob Glass punt and then handed it to Dave Brown who returned it 60 yards for a touchdown. Tulane then took a 7–6 lead later in the first on a 25-yard Lou Thomas touchdown pass to Gordon English, and extended it to 14–6 at halftime when Thomas threw his second touchdown of the afternoon to Bob Grush. Alabama responded in the third with a 3-yard Nelson to Holt Rast touchdown pass and with the game-winning points on a 2-yard Don Salls touchdown run in the fourth.

=== Georgia Tech ===
Team	1	2	3	4	Total
Georgia Tech	0	0	0	0	0
• #9 Alabama	0	6	7	7	20

- Date: November 15
- Location: Legion Field
  Birmingham, AL
- Game attendance: 25,000

Prior to their final home game of the season against Georgia Tech, Alabama moved up from the No. 13 position to the No. 9 position in the AP Poll. Against the Yellow Jackets, the Crimson Tide won with a 20–0 shutout at Legion Field. After a scoreless first quarter, Alabama scored one touchdown in each of the three remaining quarters in the victory. Howard Hughes scored in the second on a 2-yard run, Jimmy Nelson scored on a 68-yard punt return in the third and Nelson threw a 4-yard touchdown pass to Russ Craft in the fourth.

=== Vanderbilt ===
Team	1	2	3	4	Total
#7 Alabama	0	0	0	0	0
• Vanderbilt	0	0	7	0	7

- Date: November 22
- Location: Dudley Field
  Nashville, TN
- Game attendance: 12,000

After their victory over Georgia Tech, Alabama moved up two spots to the No. 7 position in the AP Poll prior to their game against Vanderbilt. In their game against the Commodores, Alabama lost 7–0 in rainy and muddy conditions on the road at Dudley Field. The only points of the game came in the third quarter when Art Rebrovich threw a 25-yard touchdown pass to Jack Jenkins.

=== Miami (FL) ===
Team	1	2	3	4	Total
• #18 Alabama	7	7	7	0	21
Miami	7	0	0	0	7

- Date: November 28
- Location: Burdine Stadium
  Miami, FL
- Game attendance: 26,000

After their loss to Vanderbilt, Alabama moved down eleven spots to the No. 18 position in the AP Poll prior to their game against Miami. In their game against the Hurricanes on a Friday evening, Alabama won 21–7 in what was the first all-time meeting between the schools. After an 85-yard punt return by Jimmy Nelson brought the ball to the Miami 5-yard line, Russ Craft scored on a 5-yard reverse for a 7–0 Alabama lead. Howard Plasman tied the game at 7–7 on the ensuing possession with his 2-yard touchdown run. The Crimson Tide retook the lead in the second on a 28-yard Dave Brown touchdown run and then scored again in the third quarter on a Nelson run for the 21–7 victory.

=== Texas A&M ===
Cotton Bowl Classic

Team	1	2	3	4	Total
• #20 Alabama	0	7	13	9	29
#9 Texas A&M	0	7	0	14	21

- Date: January 1, 1942
- Location: Cotton Bowl
  Dallas, TX
- Game attendance: 38,000

In the 1942 Cotton Bowl Classic against Texas A&M, Alabama was outgained 309 yards to 75 and earned just one official first down, but were able to win the game 29–21. In the game, Alabama's defense forced 12 turnovers (seven interceptions and five fumbles). The Crimson Tide scored a touchdown on a 72-yard punt return, a 12-yard interception return, scored two touchdowns after recovering A&M fumbles on the A&M 21 and 24-yard lines and kicked a field goal after they intercepted a pass on the Texas A&M 17.

== National championship claim ==
In the 1980s, Alabama claimed the 1941 championship as awarded by the Houlgate System. The Houlgate System was a mathematical ranking system devised by Dale Houlgate that was syndicated in newspapers between 1927 and 1958 to determine the national champion and is recognized by the NCAA as a "major selector" of national championships. The claim is shared with Minnesota, who was selected by the other eleven major selectors of the time.

== Personnel ==
=== Varsity letter winners ===
Player	Hometown	Position
Sumpter Blackmon	Columbus, Georgia	Quarterback
Dave Brown	Birmingham, Alabama	Halfback
Russ Craft	Beach Bottom, West Virginia	Halfback
Joe Domnanovich	South Bend, Indiana	Center
Leon Fichman	Los Angeles, California	Tackle
George Gammon	Cullman, Alabama	Halfback
Cliff Hansen	Gary, Indiana	Tackle
George Hecht	Chicago Heights, Illinois	Guard
Howard Hughes	Little Rock, Arkansas	Tackle
Morton Kimball	South Bend, Indiana	Guard
Noah Langdale	Valdosta, Georgia	Tackle
Wheeler Leeth	Boaz, Alabama	End
Tony Leon	Follansbee, West Virginia	Guard
Jack McKewen	Birmingham, Alabama	Tackle
Ted McKosky	Monessen, Pennsylvania	Guard
Carl Mims	Sylacauga, Alabama	Halfback
Russ Mosley	Blytheville, Arkansas	Halfback
Jimmy Nelson	Live Oak, Florida	Halfback
Julius Papias	Hammond, Indiana	Halfback
Holt Rast	Birmingham, Alabama	End
Al Sabo	Los Angeles, California	Quarterback
Don Salls	White Plains, New York	Fullback
Lou Scales	Glencoe, Alabama	Fullback
Sam Sharpe	Birmingham, Alabama	End
Vaughn Stewart	Anniston, Alabama	Center
George Weeks	Dothan, Alabama	End
Don Whitmire	Decatur, Alabama	Guard
John Wyhonic	Connorville, Ohio	Guard

=== Coaching staff ===
Name	Position	Seasons at Alabama	Alma mater
Frank Thomas	Head coach	11	Notre Dame (1923)
Paul Burnum	Assistant coach	12	Alabama (1922)
Tilden Campbell	Assistant coach	6	Alabama (1935)
Hank Crisp	Assistant coach	21	VPI (1920)
Harold Drew	Assistant coach	11	Bates (1916)

== After the season ==
=== NFL draft ===
Several players that were varsity lettermen from the 1941 squad were drafted into the National Football League (NFL) between the 1942 and 1944 drafts. These players included the following:

Year	Round	Overall	Player name	Position	NFL team
1942	9	79	Noah Langdale	Tackle	Green Bay Packers
1942	14	123	John Wyhonic	Guard	Philadelphia Eagles
1942	18	170	Holt Rast	End	Chicago Bears
1942	19	174	Jimmy Nelson	Back	Chicago Cardinals
1943	4	28	Joe Domnanovich	Center	Brooklyn Dodgers
1943	5	33	George Hecht	Guard	Chicago Cardinals
1943	8	70	Tony Leon	Guard	Washington Redskins
1943	14	122	George Weeks	End	Philadelphia Eagles
1943	14	125	Sam Sharpe	End	Cleveland Rams
1943	15	132	Russ Craft	Back	Philadelphia Eagles
1943	25	236	Dave Brown	Back	New York Giants
1943	29	274	Al Sabo	Back	Brooklyn Dodgers
1944	9	82	Don Whitmire	Tackle	Green Bay Packers
1944	13	126	Bill Baughman	Center	Green Bay Packers
