= 1941 Tulane Green Wave football team =

American college football season

1941 Tulane Green Wave football
- Conference: Southeastern Conference
- Record: 5–4 (2–3 SEC)
- Head coach: Red Dawson (6th season)
- Captains: Pete Mandich; James Thibault
- Home stadium: Tulane Stadium

1941 Southeastern Conference football standings
	Conf.					Overall
Team		W		L			W		L
No. 16 Mississippi State $	4	–	0	–	1	8	–	1	–	1
No. 18 Tennessee	3	–	1	–	0	8	–	2	–	0
No. 20 Alabama	5	–	2	–	0	9	–	2	–	0
No. 14 Georgia	3	–	1	–	1	9	–	1	–	1
No. 17 Ole Miss	2	–	1	–	1	6	–	2	–	1
Vanderbilt	3	–	2	–	0	8	–	2	–	0
LSU	2	–	2	–	2	4	–	4	–	2
Tulane	2	–	3	–	0	5	–	4	–	0
Georgia Tech	2	–	4	–	0	3	–	6	–	0
Florida	1	–	3	–	0	4	–	6	–	0
Kentucky	0	–	4	–	0	5	–	4	–	0
Auburn	0	–	4	–	1	4	–	5	–	1
$ – Conference champion; Rankings from AP Poll

The 1941 Tulane Green Wave football team was an American football team that represented Tulane University in the Southeastern Conference (SEC) during the 1941 college football season. In its sixth and final season under head coach Red Dawson, Tulane compiled a 5–5 record (2–3 in conference games), finished eighth in the SEC, and was outscored by a total of 220 to 95. Tulane was ranked No. 11 in the final Litkenhous ratings released in December 1941.

Tackle Ernie Blandin received first-team honors from the Associated Press (AP) and United Press (UP) on the 1941 All-SEC football team. Other Tulane players receiving All-SEC honors were halfback Walter McDonald (AP-2), guard Jack Tittle (AP-2), halfback Bob Glass (AP-3), and end Bill Hornick (AP-3).

The Green Wave played its home games at Tulane Stadium in New Orleans.

== Schedule ==
Date	Opponent	Rank	Site	Result	Attendance	Source
September 27	Boston College*		Tulane Stadium; New Orleans, LA	W 21–7	45,000	
October 4	Auburn		Tulane Stadium; New Orleans, LA (rivalry)	W 32–0	35,000	
October 11	at Rice*		Rice Field; Houston, TX	L 9–10	25,000	
October 18	North Carolina*	No. 17	Tulane Stadium; New Orleans, LA	W 52–6	33,000	
October 25	Ole Miss	No. 10	Tulane Stadium; New Orleans, LA (rivalry)	L 13–20	45,000	
November 1	No. 10 Vanderbilt		Dudley Field; Nashville, TN	W 34–14	22,000	
November 8	No. 13 Alabama	No. 14	Tulane Stadium; New Orleans, LA	L 14–19	50,000	
November 15	vs. NYU*		Yankee Stadium; Bronx, NY	W 45–0	10,000	
November 29	LSU		Tulane Stadium; New Orleans (Battle for the Rag)	L 0–19	50,764	
*Non-conference game; Rankings from AP Poll released prior to the game

== Rankings ==
Ranking movements Legend: ██ Increase in ranking ██ Decrease in ranking — = Not ranked ( ) = First-place votes
	Week							
Poll	1	2	3	4	5	6	7	Final
AP	17 (1)	10 (1)	—	14	—	—	—	—
