= 1941 Vanderbilt Commodores football team =

American college football season

1941 Vanderbilt Commodores football
- Conference: Southeastern Conference
- Record: 8–2 (3–2 SEC)
- Head coach: Red Sanders (2nd season)
- Offensive scheme: Single-wing
- Captain: Joe Atkinson
- Home stadium: Dudley Field

1941 Southeastern Conference football standings
| | Conf. | | | | | Overall |
| Team | | W | | L | | | W | | L |
|---|---|---|---|---|---|---|---|---|---|---|
| No. 16 Mississippi State $ | 4 | – | 0 | – | 1 | 8 | – | 1 | – | 1 |
| No. 18 Tennessee | 3 | – | 1 | – | 0 | 8 | – | 2 | – | 0 |
| No. 20 Alabama | 5 | – | 2 | – | 0 | 9 | – | 2 | – | 0 |
| No. 14 Georgia | 3 | – | 1 | – | 1 | 9 | – | 1 | – | 1 |
| No. 17 Ole Miss | 2 | – | 1 | – | 1 | 6 | – | 2 | – | 1 |
| Vanderbilt | 3 | – | 2 | – | 0 | 8 | – | 2 | – | 0 |
| LSU | 2 | – | 2 | – | 2 | 4 | – | 4 | – | 2 |
| Tulane | 2 | – | 3 | – | 0 | 5 | – | 4 | – | 0 |
| Georgia Tech | 2 | – | 4 | – | 0 | 3 | – | 6 | – | 0 |
| Florida | 1 | – | 3 | – | 0 | 4 | – | 6 | – | 0 |
| Kentucky | 0 | – | 4 | – | 0 | 5 | – | 4 | – | 0 |
| Auburn | 0 | – | 4 | – | 1 | 4 | – | 5 | – | 1 |
$ – Conference champion; Rankings from AP Poll

The 1941 Vanderbilt Commodores football team was an American football team that represented Vanderbilt University in the Southeastern Conference during the 1941 college football season. In their second season under head coach Red Sanders, the Commodores compiled an 8–2 record (3–2 in conference play) and outscored opponents by a total of 260 to 89.

The highlight of the season was a defeat of seventh-ranked Alabama in a driving rainstorm in Nashville; up to that time, only the second time in Commodore history where they defeated a ranked team. On November 9, Vanderbilt played the school's 439th game and defeated Georgia Tech, 14–7, for the 300th win in program history.

Two Vanderbilt players were selected by the Associated Press (AP) and the United Press (UP) as first-team players on the 1941 All-SEC football team: center Bob Gude (AP-1, UP-1) and fullback Jack Jenkins (AP-1, UP-1).

Vanderbilt was ranked at No. 14 (out of 681 teams) in the final rankings under the Litkenhous Difference by Score System for 1941.

The Commodores played their home games at Dudley Field in Nashville, Tennessee.

== Schedule ==
| Date | Time | Opponent | Rank | Site | Result | Attendance | Source |
|---|---|---|---|---|---|---|---|
| September 27 | | at Purdue* | | Ross–Ade Stadium; West Lafayette, IN | W 3–0 | 17,000 | |
| October 4 | | Tennessee Tech* | | Dudley Field; Nashville, TN | W 42–0 | 8,000 | |
| October 11 | | at Kentucky | | Stoll Field/McLean Stadium; Lexington, KY (rivalry) | W 39–15 | 11,000 | |
| October 18 | | Georgia Tech | No. 18 | Dudley Field; Nashville, TN (rivalry) | W 14–7 | 15,000 | |
| October 25 | | Princeton* | No. 15 | Dudley Field; Nashville, TN | W 46–7 | 14,000 | |
| November 1 | | Tulane | No. 10 | Dudley Field; Nashville, TN | L 14–34 | 22,000 | |
| November 8 | | Sewanee | | Dudley Field; Nashville, TN (rivalry) | W 20–0 | 5,000 | |
| November 16 | 2:00 p.m. | at Louisville* | | duPont Manual Stadium; Louisville, KY | W 68–0 | 4,000 | |
| November 22 | | No. 7 Alabama | | Dudley Field; Nashville, TN | W 7–0 | 12,000 | |
| November 29 | | at Tennessee | No. 12 | Shields–Watkins Field; Knoxville, TN (rivalry) | L 7–26 | 30,000 | |
*Non-conference game; Rankings from AP Poll released prior to the game; All times are in Central time

== Rankings ==
Ranking movements Legend: ██ Increase in ranking ██ Decrease in ranking — = Not ranked
| | Week | | | | | | | |
| Poll | 1 | 2 | 3 | 4 | 5 | 6 | 7 | Final |
|---|---|---|---|---|---|---|---|---|
| AP | 18 | 15 | 10 | — | — | — | 12 | — |
