= 1941 Georgia Bulldogs football team =

American college football season

1941 Georgia Bulldogs football

Orange Bowl champion

Orange Bowl, W 40–26 vs. TCU
- Conference: Southeastern Conference

Ranking
- AP: No. 14
- Record: 9–1–1 (3–1–1 SEC)
- Head coach: Wally Butts (3rd season)
- Home stadium: Sanford Stadium

1941 Southeastern Conference football standings
	Conf.					Overall
Team		W		L			W		L
No. 16 Mississippi State $	4	–	0	–	1	8	–	1	–	1
No. 18 Tennessee	3	–	1	–	0	8	–	2	–	0
No. 20 Alabama	5	–	2	–	0	9	–	2	–	0
No. 14 Georgia	3	–	1	–	1	9	–	1	–	1
No. 17 Ole Miss	2	–	1	–	1	6	–	2	–	1
Vanderbilt	3	–	2	–	0	8	–	2	–	0
LSU	2	–	2	–	2	4	–	4	–	2
Tulane	2	–	3	–	0	5	–	4	–	0
Georgia Tech	2	–	4	–	0	3	–	6	–	0
Florida	1	–	3	–	0	4	–	6	–	0
Kentucky	0	–	4	–	0	5	–	4	–	0
Auburn	0	–	4	–	1	4	–	5	–	1
$ – Conference champion; Rankings from AP Poll

The 1941 Georgia Bulldogs football team was an American football team that represented the University of Georgia as a member of the Southeastern Conference during the 1941 college football season. In their third season under head coach Wally Butts, the team compiled a 9–1–1 record (3–1–1 against SEC opponents), finished third in the SEC, outscored opponents by a total of 319 to 85, and defeated TCU in the 1942 Orange Bowl. The team played its home games at Sanford Stadium in Athens, Georgia, and at Ponce de Leon Park and Grant Field in Atlanta.

Halfback Frank Sinkwich was selected as a consensus first-team player on the 1941 All-America team. Early in the season, Sinkwich suffered a broken jaw and had to play with his jaw wired shut and a large jaw protector attached to his helmet. In the Orange Bowl game, Sinkwich rushed for 139 yards (including a 43-yard touchdown run) on 22 carries and completed nine of 13 passes for 245 yards and three touchdowns.

Five Georgia players were recognized by the Associated Press (AP) or United Press (UP) on the 1941 All-SEC football team: Sinkwich (AP-1, UP-1); end George Webb (AP-2); tackle Charles Sanders (AP-2); halfback Cliff Kimsey (AP-3); end George Poschner (AP-3); guard Walter Ruark (AP-3).

== Schedule ==
Date	Opponent	Rank	Site	Result	Attendance	Source
September 27	at Mercer*		Porter Field; Macon, GA	W 81–0	12,000	
October 4	South Carolina*		Sanford Stadium; Athens, GA (rivalry)	W 34–6	17,000	
October 10	Ole Miss		Sanford Stadium; Athens, GA	T 14–14	25,000	
October 18	at No. 20 Columbia*		Baker Field; New York, NY	W 7–3	27,000	
October 25	at Alabama		Legion Field; Birmingham, AL (rivalry)	L 14–27	23,000	
November 1	vs. Auburn		Memorial Stadium; Columbus, GA (rivalry)	W 7–0	17,000	
November 8	vs. Florida		Municipal Stadium; Jacksonville, FL (rivalry)	W 19–3	21,000	
November 15	vs. Centre*		Ponce de Leon Park; Atlanta, GA	W 47–6	5,000	
November 22	Dartmouth*^{†}	No. 20	Sanford Stadium; Athens, GA	W 35–0	> 18,000	
November 29	at Georgia Tech	No. 20	Grant Field; Atlanta, GA (rivalry)	W 21–0	31,000	
January 1, 1942	vs. TCU*	No. 14	Burdine Stadium; Miami, FL (Orange Bowl)	W 40–26	38,000	
*Non-conference game; ^{†}Homecoming; Rankings from AP Poll released prior to the game

== Rankings ==
Ranking movements Legend: ██ Increase in ranking ██ Decrease in ranking — = Not ranked т = Tied with team above or below
	Week							
Poll	1	2	3	4	5	6	7	Final
AP	—	—	—	—	—	20т	20	14
