= 1941 Auburn Tigers football team =

American college football season

1941 Auburn Tigers football
- Conference: Southeastern Conference
- Record: 4–5–1 (0–4–1 SEC)
- Head coach: Jack Meagher (8th season)
- Home stadium: Auburn Stadium; Legion Field; Cramton Bowl

1941 Southeastern Conference football standings
	Conf.					Overall
Team		W		L			W		L
No. 16 Mississippi State $	4	–	0	–	1	8	–	1	–	1
No. 18 Tennessee	3	–	1	–	0	8	–	2	–	0
No. 20 Alabama	5	–	2	–	0	9	–	2	–	0
No. 14 Georgia	3	–	1	–	1	9	–	1	–	1
No. 17 Ole Miss	2	–	1	–	1	6	–	2	–	1
Vanderbilt	3	–	2	–	0	8	–	2	–	0
LSU	2	–	2	–	2	4	–	4	–	2
Tulane	2	–	3	–	0	5	–	4	–	0
Georgia Tech	2	–	4	–	0	3	–	6	–	0
Florida	1	–	3	–	0	4	–	6	–	0
Kentucky	0	–	4	–	0	5	–	4	–	0
Auburn	0	–	4	–	1	4	–	5	–	1
$ – Conference champion; Rankings from AP Poll

The 1941 Auburn Tigers football team was an American football team that represented Auburn University in Southeastern Conference (SEC) during the 1941 college football season. In their eighth season under head coach Jack Meagher, the Tigers compiled a record of four wins, five losses and one tie (4–5–1 overall, 0–4–1 in the SEC), finished in last place in the SEC, and outscored opponents by a total of 123 to 115.

Key players on the 1941 Auburn team included quarterback William Eugene Barrineau, halfback Monk Gafford, and tackle J. H. McClurkin. Cheatham was selected by the United Press as the first-team quarterback on the 1941 All-SEC football team. Gafford was selected by the International News Service as a first-team halfback on the 1942 All-America team.

Auburn was ranked at No. 38 (out of 681 teams) in the final rankings under the Litkenhous Difference by Score System for 1941.

The team divided its home games between Auburn Stadium in Auburn, Alabama, Legion Field in Birmingham, Alabama, and Cramton Bowl in Montgomery, Alabama.

== Schedule ==
Date	Opponent	Site	Result	Attendance	Source
September 26	Howard (AL)*	Cramton Bowl; Montgomery, AL	W 13–0	9,000	
October 4	at Tulane	Tulane Stadium; New Orleans, LA (rivalry)	L 0–32	35,000	
October 11	Louisiana Tech*	Auburn Stadium; Auburn, AL	W 34–0	8,500	
October 18	SMU*	Legion Field; Birmingham, AL	L 7–20	12,000	
October 25	at Georgia Tech	Grant Field; Atlanta, GA (rivalry)	L 14–28	20,000	
November 1	vs. Georgia	Memorial Stadium; Columbus, GA (rivalry)	L 0–7	17,000	
November 8	No. 15 Mississippi State	Legion Field; Birmingham, AL	L 7–14	11,000	
November 15	at LSU	Tiger Stadium; Baton Rouge, LA (rivalry)	T 7–7		
November 22	at Villanova*	Shibe Park; Philadelphia, PA	W 13–0	12,000	
November 29	No. 16 Clemson*^{†}	Auburn Stadium; Auburn, AL (rivalry)	W 28–7	12,000	
*Non-conference game; ^{†}Homecoming; Rankings from AP Poll released prior to the game
