= 1941 Georgia Tech Yellow Jackets football team =

American college football season

1941 Georgia Tech Yellow Jackets football
- Conference: Southeastern Conference
- Record: 3–6 (2–4 SEC)
- Head coach: William Alexander (22nd season)
- Captain: Charles R. Sanders
- Home stadium: Grant Field

1941 Southeastern Conference football standings
	Conf.					Overall
Team		W		L			W		L
No. 16 Mississippi State $	4	–	0	–	1	8	–	1	–	1
No. 18 Tennessee	3	–	1	–	0	8	–	2	–	0
No. 20 Alabama	5	–	2	–	0	9	–	2	–	0
No. 14 Georgia	3	–	1	–	1	9	–	1	–	1
No. 17 Ole Miss	2	–	1	–	1	6	–	2	–	1
Vanderbilt	3	–	2	–	0	8	–	2	–	0
LSU	2	–	2	–	2	4	–	4	–	2
Tulane	2	–	3	–	0	5	–	4	–	0
Georgia Tech	2	–	4	–	0	3	–	6	–	0
Florida	1	–	3	–	0	4	–	6	–	0
Kentucky	0	–	4	–	0	5	–	4	–	0
Auburn	0	–	4	–	1	4	–	5	–	1
$ – Conference champion; Rankings from AP Poll

The 1941 Georgia Tech Yellow Jackets football team was an American football team that represented the Georgia Institute of Technology in the Southeastern Conference (SEC) during the 1941 college football season. In their 22nd season under head coach William Alexander, the Yellow Jackets compiled a 3–6 record (2–4 against SEC opponents) and were outscored by a total of 130 to 82.

Georgia Tech was ranked at No. 40 (out of 681 teams) in the final rankings under the Litkenhous Difference by Score System for 1941.

The team played its home games at Grant Field in Atlanta.

== Schedule ==
Date	Opponent	Site	Result	Attendance	Source
October 4	Chattanooga*	Grant Field; Atlanta, GA	W 20–0	10,000	
October 11	Notre Dame*	Grant Field; Atlanta, GA (rivalry)	L 0–20	31,000	
October 18	at No. 18 Vanderbilt	Dudley Field; Nashville, TN (rivalry)	L 7–14	15,000	
October 25	Auburn	Grant Field; Atlanta, GA (rivalry)	W 28–14	20,000	
November 1	No. 4 Duke*	Grant Field; Atlanta, GA	L 0–14	28,000	
November 8	Kentucky	Grant Field; Atlanta, GA	W 20–13	15,000	
November 15	at No. 9 Alabama	Legion Field; Birmingham, AL (rivalry)	L 0–20	25,000	
November 22	at Florida	Florida Field; Gainesville, FL	L 7–14	15,000	
November 29	No. 20 Georgia	Grant Field; Atlanta, GA (rivalry)	L 0–21	31,000	
*Non-conference game; Rankings from AP Poll released prior to the game
