= 1941 Mississippi State Maroons football team =

American college football season

1941 Mississippi State Maroons football

SEC champion
- Conference: Southeastern Conference

Ranking
- AP: No. 16
- Record: 8–1–1 (4–0–1 SEC)
- Head coach: Allyn McKeen (3rd season)
- Home stadium: Scott Field

1941 Southeastern Conference football standings
	Conf.					Overall
Team		W		L			W		L
No. 16 Mississippi State $	4	–	0	–	1	8	–	1	–	1
No. 18 Tennessee	3	–	1	–	0	8	–	2	–	0
No. 20 Alabama	5	–	2	–	0	9	–	2	–	0
No. 14 Georgia	3	–	1	–	1	9	–	1	–	1
No. 17 Ole Miss	2	–	1	–	1	6	–	2	–	1
Vanderbilt	3	–	2	–	0	8	–	2	–	0
LSU	2	–	2	–	2	4	–	4	–	2
Tulane	2	–	3	–	0	5	–	4	–	0
Georgia Tech	2	–	4	–	0	3	–	6	–	0
Florida	1	–	3	–	0	4	–	6	–	0
Kentucky	0	–	4	–	0	5	–	4	–	0
Auburn	0	–	4	–	1	4	–	5	–	1
$ – Conference champion; Rankings from AP Poll

The 1941 Mississippi State Maroons football team was an American football team that represented Mississippi State College in the Southeastern Conference (SEC) during the 1941 college football season. In their third season under head coach Allyn McKeen, the Maroons compiled an 8–1–1 record (4–0–1 against SEC opponents), won the only SEC championship in school history, outscored opponents by a total of 191 to 55, and were ranked No. 16 in the final AP Poll.

After losing eight of eleven starters from the undefeated 1940 team, the Maroons were picked to finish at or near the bottom of the SEC in 1941. Yet, they won games against conference opponents, Florida, Alabama, Auburn, and Ole Miss, and played a scoreless tie against LSU. The sole loss of the season was to No. 10 Duquesne. The 1941 season was the second consecutive season in which Mississippi State went undefeated against SEC opponents.

Two Mississippi State players were named to the 1941 All-SEC football team. Tackle Bill Arnold received first-team honors from the Associated Press (AP) and second-team honors from the United Press (UP). Halfback Johnnie "Blondy" Black was picked by the UP for the second team.

Mississippi State was ranked at No. 19 (out of 681 teams) in the final rankings under the Litkenhous Difference by Score System for 1941.

Through the 2025 season, this remains the only conference championship for Mississippi State, as they haven't won one since, and the closest they have come was in 1998, when they played in the SEC Championship Game, but lost to Tennessee.

== Schedule ==
Date	Opponent	Rank	Site	Result	Attendance	Source
September 27	Florida		Scott Field; Starkville, MS	W 6–0	13,000	
October 4	at Alabama		Denny Stadium; Tuscaloosa, AL (rivalry)	W 14–0	20,000	
October 11	at LSU		Tiger Stadium; Baton Rouge, LA (rivalry)	T 0–0	30,000	
October 25	Union (TN)*		Scott Field; Starkville, MS	W 56–7	14,000	
November 1	at Southwestern*	No. 17	Crump Stadium; Memphis, TN	W 20–6		
November 8	at Auburn	No. 15	Legion Field; Birmingham, AL	W 14–7	11,000	
November 15	at No. 10 Duquesne*	No. 13	Forbes Field; Pittsburgh, PA	L 0–16	31,483	
November 22	Millsaps*		Scott Field; Starkville, MS	W 49–6		
November 29	at No. 14 Ole Miss		Hemingway Stadium; Oxford, MS (Egg Bowl)	W 6–0	28,000	
December 6	at San Francisco*	No. 16	Kezar Stadium; San Francisco, CA	W 26–13	25,000	
*Non-conference game; Rankings from AP Poll released prior to the game

== Rankings ==
Ranking movements Legend: ██ Increase in ranking ██ Decrease in ranking — = Not ranked т = Tied with team above or below ( ) = First-place votes
	Week							
Poll	1	2	3	4	5	6	7	Final
AP	19	—	17т	15	13 (0.5)	—	—	16
