= 1941 LSU Tigers football team =

American college football season

1941 LSU Tigers football
- Conference: Southeastern Conference
- Record: 4–4–2 (2–2–2 SEC)
- Head coach: Bernie Moore (7th season)
- Home stadium: Tiger Stadium

1941 Southeastern Conference football standings
	Conf.					Overall
Team		W		L			W		L
No. 16 Mississippi State $	4	–	0	–	1	8	–	1	–	1
No. 18 Tennessee	3	–	1	–	0	8	–	2	–	0
No. 20 Alabama	5	–	2	–	0	9	–	2	–	0
No. 14 Georgia	3	–	1	–	1	9	–	1	–	1
No. 17 Ole Miss	2	–	1	–	1	6	–	2	–	1
Vanderbilt	3	–	2	–	0	8	–	2	–	0
LSU	2	–	2	–	2	4	–	4	–	2
Tulane	2	–	3	–	0	5	–	4	–	0
Georgia Tech	2	–	4	–	0	3	–	6	–	0
Florida	1	–	3	–	0	4	–	6	–	0
Kentucky	0	–	4	–	0	5	–	4	–	0
Auburn	0	–	4	–	1	4	–	5	–	1
$ – Conference champion; Rankings from AP Poll

The 1941 LSU Tigers football team was an American football team that represented Louisiana State University (LSU) in the Southeastern Conference (SEC) during the 1941 college football season. In their seventh season under head coach Bernie Moore, the Tigers compiled a 4–4–2 record (2–2–2 against SEC opponents), finished seventh in the conference, and outscored opponents by a total of 119 to 93.

Senior center Bernie Lipkis was selected as the team's most valuable player. Triple-threat tailback Leo Bird placed second, and fullback Walt Gorinski placed third. Gorinski later played professional football for the Pittsburgh Steelers.

LSU was ranked at No. 22 (out of 681 teams) in the final rankings under the Litkenhous Difference by Score System for 1941.

The team played its home games at Tiger Stadium in Baton Rouge, Louisiana.

== Schedule ==
Date	Opponent	Site	Result	Attendance	Source
September 20	Louisiana Tech*	Tiger Stadium; Baton Rouge, LA	W 25–0	10,000	
September 27	Holy Cross*	Tiger Stadium; Baton Rouge, LA	L 13–19	25,000	
October 4	at Texas*	Memorial Stadium; Austin, TX	L 0–34	18,000	
October 11	Mississippi State	Tiger Stadium; Baton Rouge, LA (rivalry)	T 0–0	30,000	
October 18	Rice*	Tiger Stadium; Baton Rouge, LA	W 27–0	25,000	
October 25	Florida	Tiger Stadium; Baton Rouge, LA (rivalry)	W 10–7	20,000	
November 1	Tennessee^{†}	Tiger Stadium; Baton Rouge, LA	L 6–13	30,000	
November 8	No. 16 Ole Miss	Tiger Stadium; Baton Rouge, LA (rivalry)	L 12–13	28,000	
November 15	Auburn	Tiger Stadium; Baton Rouge, LA (rivalry)	T 7–7		
November 29	at Tulane	Tulane Stadium; New Orleans, LA (Battle for the Rag)	W 19–0	50,764	
*Non-conference game; ^{†}Homecoming; Rankings from AP Poll released prior to the game
