= Forest K. Ferguson =

American college athlete and U.S. Army lieutenant

- Ferguson in a three-point stance

No. 4, 8 – Florida Gators
- Position: End
- Class: Graduate

Personal information
- Born: June 21, 1919; South Jacksonville, Florida, U.S.
- Died: May 15, 1954 (aged 34); Coral Gables, Florida, U.S.
- Listed height: 6 ft 3 in (1.91 m)
- Listed weight: 197 lb (89 kg)

Career information
- High school: Martin County (Stuart, Florida)
- College: Florida (1939–1941)

Awards and highlights
- First-team All-SEC (1941); University of Florida Athletic Hall of Fame

Forest King Ferguson, Jr. (June 21, 1919 – May 15, 1954), nicknamed Fergie Ferguson, was an American college athlete who attended the University of Florida and was a member of the university's football, boxing, and track and field teams, and later served as a decorated officer in the U.S. Army. He is remembered as one of the most remarkable athletes that the University of Florida ever produced.

== Early life ==
Ferguson was born in South Jacksonville, Florida, in 1919. His father, Forest K. Ferguson, Sr., was a Massachusetts native who was employed in 1920 as a boilermaker for a railroad company. His mother Frances Loretta (sometimes referred to as "Fannie") Ferguson was a New York native. Ferguson was the middle child, having an older sister, Aurora, and a younger brother, Wilbur.

By 1930 and continuing through at least 1935, the family lived at Jensen in Martin County, Florida, where Ferguson's father was employed as a fisherman. In 1937, the family moved to nearby Stuart, Florida, where Ferguson became a multi-sport star athlete for Martin County High School. He was later remembered for leading Martin County's high school football team to its first-ever victory over nemesis Fort Pierce High School, a game in which he caught two passes for touchdowns and two more for extra points.

== University of Florida ==
Ferguson entered the University of Florida as a freshman in the fall of 1938, and, after he became eligible as a sophomore, he quickly claimed his position as a three-year starter at end for coach Josh Cody and coach Tom Lieb's Florida Gators football teams from 1939 to 1941. Ferguson provided many of the highlights for the Gators during those years, "playing both ways," as was typical in the era of single platoon football.

As good or better on defense than he was on offense, his team records for career receptions (43) and career receiving yardage (668) remained unbroken until the 1960s, when Gators quarterbacks Steve Spurrier and John Reaves were throwing passes to star receivers Charles Casey, Richard Trapp and Carlos Alvarez in pro passing schemes. He had a dramatic impact on the Gators' prospects almost immediately as a sophomore starter in 1939, and played a key role in the Gators' 7–0 upset of coach Frank Leahy's Boston College Eagles in Boston. The Gators stopped the Eagles inside the Gators' 15-yard line five times, while Ferguson recorded six tackles for a loss, including a dramatic tackle of Eagles quarterback Charlie O'Rourke on a fourth-down play from the Gators' 4-yard line, dropping O'Rourke nine yards behind the line of scrimmage.

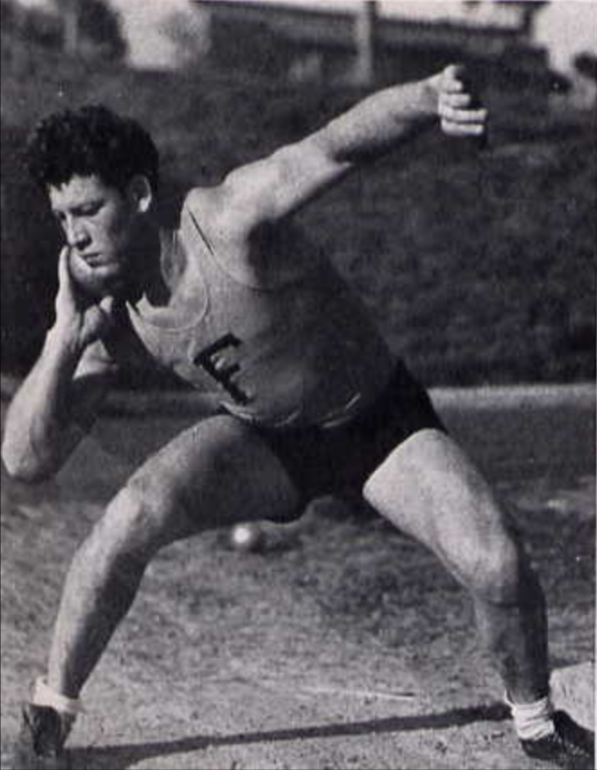
Ferguson competed in field events for the Florida track team.

Memorably, he scored both touchdowns on receptions for 45 and 74 yards in a 14–0 upset of the Miami Hurricanes in 1941, while totaling 123 yards; The Miami Herald reported the game score as "Forrest Ferguson 14; University of Miami 0." Less often remembered was the key role he played against Miami on defense: his tackles of Miami ball carriers behind the line of scrimmage totaled 62 yards of losses. The 74-yard touchdown catch remained the longest reception in team history until 1954. Seven days later, he figured prominently in the Gators' 14–7 victory over the Georgia Tech Yellow Jackets. First, he stripped the ball from a Yellow Jackets ball carrier on the Georgia Tech 28-yard line, and then two plays later, he caught a pass from Gators halfback Tommy Harrison, and when cornered by defenders he lateraled the ball to tackle Milton Hull for the touchdown.

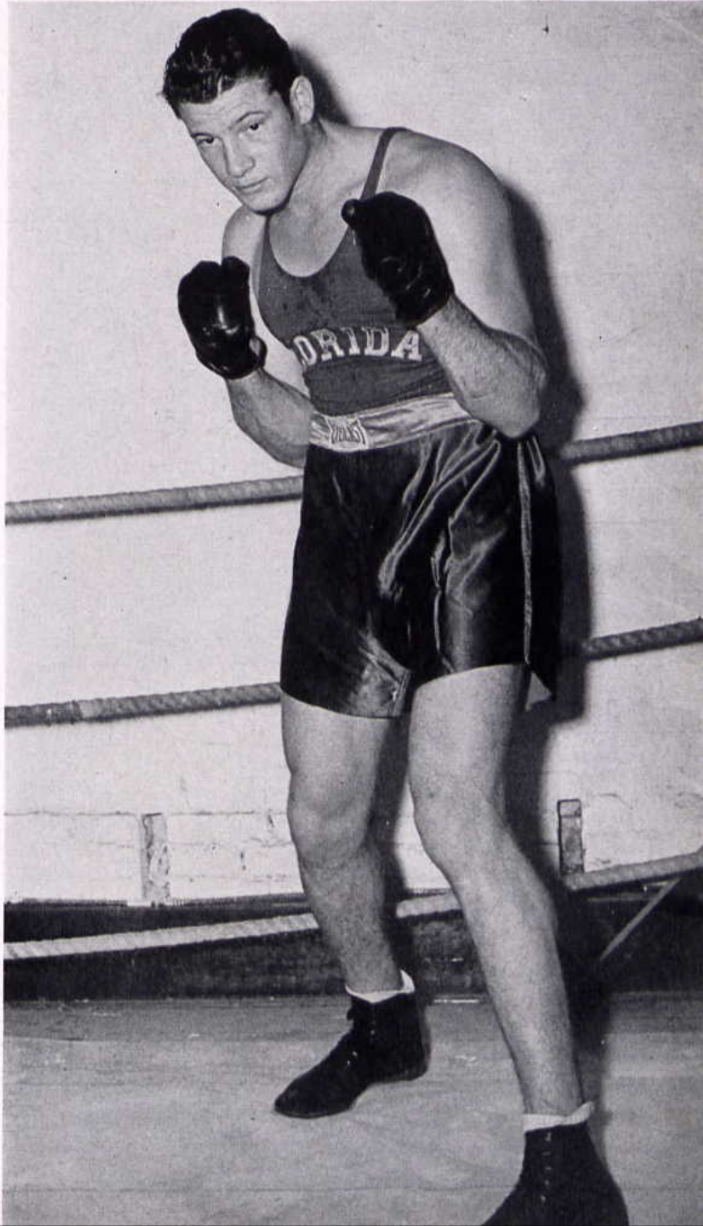
Fergie boxing in 1941 Seminole yearbook.

During his 1941 senior season, Ferguson caught a total of 26 passes in 10 games. He also led the 1941 Florida football team with 36 points scored and 420 minutes played; the 1942 Seminole yearbook referred to him as a "defensive bulwark," "colorful," and "unpredictable." After the season, he received first-team All-Southeastern Conference (SEC) honors, and was an honorable mention All-American selection by Grantland Rice in Collier's magazine.

Following his final college football season, Ferguson became the State of Florida collegiate heavyweight boxing champion, and won the Amateur Athletic Union (AAU) national championship in the javelin throw with a distance of 203 feet, 6 and 1/2 inches, in 1942. During the spring of 1942, he also played at first base for the Florida Gators baseball team. Ferguson graduated from the University of Florida with a bachelor's degree in education in 1942.

== Military service ==
Several months after the United States entered World War II, Ferguson joined the U.S. Army in 1942, and was commissioned as a second lieutenant after attending officers' candidate school. On June 6, 1944, he led a platoon in the anti-tank company, 116th Infantry Regiment of the 29th Infantry Division in the Allies' D-Day landings on Omaha Beach in Nazi-occupied Normandy, France. After landing in the second wave of the amphibious assault, Ferguson and his platoon, as well as the survivors from the first wave, were pinned down on the beach by heavy rifle, machine gun and artillery fire from the German defenders, and their advance was blocked by extensive barbed wire and other enemy obstacles. Ferguson rose under fire, cleared a passage through the enemy obstacles with a Bangalore torpedo, and was gravely wounded while leading his men in a direct frontal assault against the enemy. Ferguson was awarded the U.S. Army's Distinguished Service Cross, the nation's second highest medal for gallantry, for "extraordinary heroism" in combat on June 6, 1944.

== Death and legacy ==
Ferguson never fully recovered from his head wound, and died from complications arising from his war-time injuries on May 15, 1954, at the Veterans Administration Hospital in Coral Gables, Florida; he was 34 years old. Following a community memorial service at the First Baptist Church in Stuart, he was buried with military honors in All Saints Cemetery in Jensen Beach, Florida. After his death, several of his former Gators teammates established what is commonly known as the "Fergie Ferguson Award" in his memory; since 1955, it has been presented annually to the senior player for the Florida Gators football team "who displays outstanding leadership, character and courage." He was later inducted into the University of Florida Athletic Hall of Fame as a "Gator Great," and was unanimously elected to the Florida Sports Hall of Fame by the 65 participating Florida sportswriters in 1957.

== See also ==
- Florida Gators football, 1930–1939
- Florida Gators football, 1940–1949
- List of University of Florida alumni
- List of University of Florida Athletic Hall of Fame members
