= 1941 Kentucky Wildcats football team =

American college football season

1941 Kentucky Wildcats football
- Conference: Southeastern Conference
- Record: 5–4 (0–4 SEC)
- Head coach: Albert D. Kirwan (4th season)
- Captain: None
- Home stadium: McLean Stadium

1941 Southeastern Conference football standings
	Conf.					Overall
Team		W		L			W		L
No. 16 Mississippi State $	4	–	0	–	1	8	–	1	–	1
No. 18 Tennessee	3	–	1	–	0	8	–	2	–	0
No. 20 Alabama	5	–	2	–	0	9	–	2	–	0
No. 14 Georgia	3	–	1	–	1	9	–	1	–	1
No. 17 Ole Miss	2	–	1	–	1	6	–	2	–	1
Vanderbilt	3	–	2	–	0	8	–	2	–	0
LSU	2	–	2	–	2	4	–	4	–	2
Tulane	2	–	3	–	0	5	–	4	–	0
Georgia Tech	2	–	4	–	0	3	–	6	–	0
Florida	1	–	3	–	0	4	–	6	–	0
Kentucky	0	–	4	–	0	5	–	4	–	0
Auburn	0	–	4	–	1	4	–	5	–	1
$ – Conference champion; Rankings from AP Poll

The 1941 Kentucky Wildcats football team was an American football team that represented the University of Kentucky in Southeastern Conference (SEC) during the 1941 college football season. In their fourth season under head coach Albert D. Kirwan, the Wildcats compiled a 5–4 record (0–4 against SEC opponents) and were outscored by a total of 154 to 151.

Kentucky was ranked at No. 56 (out of 681 teams) in the final rankings under the Litkenhous Difference by Score System for 1941.

The team played its home games at McLean Stadium in Lexington, Kentucky.

== Schedule ==
Date	Opponent	Site	Result	Attendance	Source
September 27	VPI*	Manual Stadium; Louisville, KY	W 37–14	8,000	
October 4	at Washington & Lee	Lexington, VA	W 7–0	3,000	
October 11	Vanderbilt^{†}	McLean Stadium; Lexington, KY (rivalry)	L 15–39	11,000	
October 18	at Xavier*	Xavier Stadium; Cincinnati, OH	W 21–6	11,000	
October 25	West Virginia*	McLean Stadium; Lexington, KY	W 18–6	7,000	
November 1	at No. 15 Alabama	Denny Stadium; Tuscaloosa, AL	L 0–30	11,000	
November 8	at Georgia Tech	Grant Field; Atlanta, GA	L 13–20	15,000	
November 15	Southwestern*	McLean Stadium; Lexington, KY	W 33–19	8,000	
November 22	Tennessee	McLean Stadium; Lexington, KY (rivalry)	L 7–20	14,000	
*Non-conference game; ^{†}Homecoming; Rankings from AP Poll released prior to the game
