= Starjak =

Village in Zagreb, Croatia

- Village
- Location within Croatia
- Coordinates: 45°40′21″N 15°52′40″E
- Country: Croatia
- County: City of Zagreb
- City District: Brezovica

Area
  - Total: 0.81 sq mi (2.1 km^{2})
- Elevation: 541 ft (165 m)

Population (2021)
  - Total: 252
  - Density: 310/sq mi (120/km^{2})
- Time zone: UTC+1 (CET)
  - Summer (DST): UTC+2 (CEST)

Starjak is a village in Croatia. It is formally a settlement (naselje) of Zagreb, the capital of Croatia.

== Demographics ==
According to the 2021 census, its population was 252. According to the 2011 census, it had 227 inhabitants.

== Notable person ==
- Frank Sinkwich, American football player and coach
