= 1941 Florida Gators football team =

American college football season

1941 Florida Gators football
- Conference: Southeastern Conference
- Record: 4–6 (1–3 SEC)
- Head coach: Tom Lieb (2nd season)
- Captain: Bill Robinson
- Home stadium: Florida Field

1941 Southeastern Conference football standings
	Conf.					Overall
Team		W		L			W		L
No. 16 Mississippi State $	4	–	0	–	1	8	–	1	–	1
No. 18 Tennessee	3	–	1	–	0	8	–	2	–	0
No. 20 Alabama	5	–	2	–	0	9	–	2	–	0
No. 14 Georgia	3	–	1	–	1	9	–	1	–	1
No. 17 Ole Miss	2	–	1	–	1	6	–	2	–	1
Vanderbilt	3	–	2	–	0	8	–	2	–	0
LSU	2	–	2	–	2	4	–	4	–	2
Tulane	2	–	3	–	0	5	–	4	–	0
Georgia Tech	2	–	4	–	0	3	–	6	–	0
Florida	1	–	3	–	0	4	–	6	–	0
Kentucky	0	–	4	–	0	5	–	4	–	0
Auburn	0	–	4	–	1	4	–	5	–	1
$ – Conference champion; Rankings from AP Poll

The 1941 Florida Gators football team was an American football team that represented the University of Florida in the Southeastern Conference (SEC) during the 1941 college football season. In their second season under head coach Tom Lieb, the Gators compiled a 4–6 record (1–3 against SEC opponents) and outscored opponents by a total of 149 to 97. The season's highlights included a 14–0 road win over the Miami Hurricanes and a 14–7 homecoming victory over Georgia Tech.

Three Florida players were recognized by the Associated Press (AP) or United Press (UP) on the 1941 All-SEC football team: Fergie Ferguson (AP-2, UP-1); tackle Milton Hull (AP-3); and halfback Tommy Harrison (AP-3). Ferguson was the Gators' second-ever first-team All-SEC selection. He also received an honorable mention All-American by Grantland Rice in Collier's magazine. He led the team in both points scored (36) and minutes played (420).

Florida was ranked at No. 67 (out of 681 teams) in the final rankings under the Litkenhous Difference by Score System for 1941.

The team played its home games at Florida Field in Gainesville, Florida.

== Schedule ==
Date	Opponent	Site	Result	Attendance	Source
September 20	Randolph–Macon*	Florida Field; Gainesville, FL	W 26–0		
September 27	at Mississippi State	Scott Field; State College, MS	L 0–6	13,000	
October 4	Tampa*	Florida Field; Gainesville, FL	W 46–6		
October 11	Villanova*	Florida Field; Gainesville, FL	L 0–6	> 20,000	
October 18	at Maryland*	Byrd Stadium; College Park, MD	L 12–13	7,500	
October 25	at LSU	Tiger Stadium; Baton Rouge, LA (rivalry)	L 7–10	20,000	
November 8	vs. Georgia	Fairfield Stadium; Jacksonville, FL (rivalry)	L 3–19	21,000	
November 15	at Miami (FL)*	Burdine Stadium; Miami, FL (rivalry)	W 14–0	31,731	
November 22	Georgia Tech^{†}	Florida Field; Gainesville, FL	W 14–7	15,000	
December 20	vs. UCLA*	Fairfield Stadium; Jacksonville, FL	L 27–30	8,000	
*Non-conference game; ^{†}Homecoming
