= Oscar Britt =

American football player (1919–1992)

No. 29
- Position: Guard

Personal information
- Born: June 18, 1919; Brookhaven, Mississippi, U.S.
- Died: December 13, 1992 (aged 73); Ontario, California
- Listed height: 5 ft 11 in (1.80 m)
- Listed weight: 193 lb (88 kg)

Career information
- College: Mississippi
- NFL draft: 1943: 14th round, 130th overall pick

Career history
- Washington Redskins (1946)

Awards and highlights
- 2× Second-team All-SEC (1941, 1942)

Career NFL statistics
- Games played: 1
- Stats at Pro Football Reference

Oscar Lee Britt (June 18, 1919 – December 13, 1992) was an American professional football guard in the National Football League (NFL) for the Washington Redskins. He played college football at the University of Mississippi and was drafted 130th overall in the 14th round of the 1943 NFL draft. Oscar's pro football contract was for $225,00 a game, an original Leatherhead player.

== Personal life ==
Oscar married in 1949 and had six children. All of the children were living as of 2013.
