= 1941 All-America college football team =

Official list of the best college football players of 1941

The 1941 All-America college football team is composed of college football players who were selected as All-Americans by various organizations and writers that chose All-America college football teams in 1941. The nine selectors recognized by the NCAA as "official" for the 1941 season are (1) Collier's Weekly, as selected by Grantland Rice, (2) the Associated Press, (3) the United Press, (4) the All-America Board, (5) the International News Service (INS), (6) Liberty magazine, (7) the Newspaper Enterprise Association (NEA), (8) Newsweek, and (9) the Sporting News.

Harvard center Endicott Peabody, who won the 1941 Knute Rockne Award, was the only player to be unanimously named to the first team of all nine official selectors. Dick Wildung of Minnesota and Bob Westfall of Michigan each received eight official first-team designations. Bruce Smith of Minnesota won the 1941 Heisman Trophy and received seven official first-team nominations.

The United Press made its selections based on voting from sports editors and football writers and published the point totals for each player. The players receiving the highest point totals were Virginia back Bill Dudley (598), Endicott Peabody (540), Tulane tackle Ernie Blandin (503), and Minnesota tackle Dick Wildung (487).

Liberty magazine based its selections on a poll conducted by Norman L. Sper of 2,000 varsity football players from over 100 leading colleges. Players were asked to select only players against whom they played. Georgia back Frank Sinkwich was selected by the greatest percentage, receiving votes from 96 of the 99 opponents who faced him.

== Consensus All-Americans ==
For the year 1941, the NCAA recognizes nine published All-American teams as "official" designations for purposes of its consensus determinations. The following chart identifies the NCAA-recognized consensus All-Americans and displays which first-team designations they received.

Name	Position	School	Number	Official selectors	Other selectors
Endicott Peabody	Guard	Harvard	9/9	AAB, AP, CO, INS, LIB, NEA, NW, SN, UP	CP, NYS, LIFE, PARA, WC
Dick Wildung	Tackle	Minnesota	8/9	AAB, AP, INS, LIB, NEA, NW, SN, UP	CP, LIFE, PARA, WC
Bob Westfall	Fullback	Michigan	8/9	AAB, CO, INS, LIB, NEA, NW, SN, UP	CP, NYS, PARA, WC
Frankie Albert	Quarterback	Stanford	7/9	AAB, AP, CO, INS, NEA, NW, SN	CP, LIFE, PARA, WC
Bruce Smith	Halfback	Minnesota	7/9	AAB, AP, CO, INS, NW, SN, UP	CP, NYS, LIFE, PARA, WC
Holt Rast	End	Alabama	6/9	AAB, INS, LIB, SN, NW, UP	CP, LIFE, PARA, WC
Darold Jenkins	Center	Missouri	6/9	AAB, AP, NEA, NW, SN, UP	CP, NYS, WC
Bob Dove	End	Notre Dame	5/9	AAB, INS, NEA, NW, UP	LIFE; WC
Ernie Blandin	Tackle	Tulane	5/9	CO, LIB, NEA, NW, UP	NYS
Bill Dudley	Halfback	Virginia	5/9	AP, CO, LIB, NW, UP	NYS
Frank Sinkwich	Halfback	Georgia	5/9	AAB, AP, LIB, SN, UP	CP, LIFE, WC
Ray Frankowski	Guard	Washington	4/9	AAB, NEA, NW, UP	LIFE, WC

== All-American selections for 1941 ==
=== Ends ===
- Holt Rast, Alabama (AAB-1; AP-2; INS-1; LIB; NEA-2; SN; NW; UP-1 [253]; CP-1; LIFE-1; PARA; WC-1, NYDN)
- Bob Dove, Notre Dame (College Football Hall of Fame) (AAB-1; AP-3; INS-1; NEA-1; NW; UP-1 [367]; LIFE-1; WC-1, NYDN)
- Malcolm Kutner, Texas (College Football Hall of Fame) (AP-1; INS-2; CO; CP-2. LIFE-2)
- Dave Schreiner, Wisconsin (College Football Hall of Fame) (AP-1)
- Joe Blalock, Clemson (SN; UP-2 [232]; CP-1, LIFE-3)
- John Rokisky, Duquesne (AP-2; INS-2; NEA-1; CO; CP-2; PARA)
- Jim Lansing, Fordham (LIB; CP-3)
- Nick Susoeff, Washington State (AP-3)
- Bob Froude, Navy (UP-2 [197])
- James Sterling, Texas A&M (NEA-2; NYS-1)
- Bob Motl, Northwestern (NEA-3)
- Alyn Beals, Santa Clara (NEA-3)
- Billy Henderson, Texas A&M (CP-3, LIFE-2)
- Dale Gentry, Washington State (NYS-1; LIFE-3)

=== Tackles ===
- Dick Wildung, Minnesota (College Football Hall of Fame) (AAB-1; AP-1; INS-1; LIB; NEA-1; NW; SN; UP-1 [487]; CP-1; LIFE-1; PARA; WC-1; NYDN)
- Ernie Blandin, Tulane (AP-2; CO; INS-2; LIB; NEA-1; NW; UP-1 [503]; NYS-1)
- Bob Reinhard, California (AP-1; UP-2 [213]; INS-1; NEA-2; CO; CP-3; PARA, LIFE-2)
- Alf Bauman, Northwestern (AAB-1; AP-2; INS-2; NEA-2; SN; CP-2; LIFE-1; NYS-1; NYDN)
- Jim Daniell, Ohio State (CP-1)
- Al Wistert, Michigan (UP-2 [270]; CP-2 [as G], LIFE-2)
- Gene Flathmann, Navy (CP-2)
- Bill Chewning, Navy (AP-3; NEA-3)
- Mike Karmazin, Duke (AP-3, LIFE-2 [as G])
- Floyd Spendlove, Utah (NEA-3)
- Paul Lillis, Notre Dame (CP-3, LIFE-3)
- John Wyhonic, Alabama (LIFE-3)

=== Guards ===
- Endicott Peabody, Harvard (College Football Hall of Fame) (AAB-1; AP-1; CO; INS-1; LIB; NEA-1; NW; SN; UP-1 [540]; CP-1; NYS-1; LIFE-1; PARA; WC-1; NYDN)
- Ray Frankowski, Washington (AAB-1; AP-2; INS-2; NEA-1; NW; UP-1 [369]; LIFE-1; WC-1)
- Chal Daniel, Texas (AP-3; INS-1; NEA-3; SN; CP-1, LIFE-3)
- Ralph Fife, Pittsburgh (AP-1; UP-2 [252]; NEA-2; CP-3, LIFE-2; NYDN)
- Bernard Crimmins, Notre Dame (CO; LIB; INS-2; NEA-2; UP-2 [364]; PARA)
- Chuck Taylor, Stanford (NYS-1)
- Martin Ruby, Texas A&M (CP-2)
- Ted Ramsey, SMU (AP-2)
- Tom Melton, Purdue (AP-3)
- Richard Pfister, Harvard (NEA-3)
- Art Goforth, Rice (CP-3)
- Urban Odson, Minnesota (LIFE-3)

=== Centers ===
- Darold Jenkins, Missouri (College Football Hall of Fame) (AAB-1; AP-1; INS-2; NEA-1; NW; SN; UP-1 [325]; CP-1; NYS-1; WC-1, LIFE-2)
- Vince Banonis, Detroit (College Football Hall of Fame) (AP-3; CO; INS-1; LIB; NEA-2; PARA; NYDN)
- Al DeMao, Duquesne (UP-2 [171]; NEA-3; LIFE-1)
- Quentin Greenough, Oregon State (AP-2, LIFE-3)
- Vic Lindskog, Stanford (CP-2)
- Bob Gude, Vanderbilt (CP-3)

=== Quarterbacks ===
- Frankie Albert, Stanford (College Football Hall of Fame) (AAB-1; AP-1; CO; INS-1; NEA-1; NW; SN; UP-2 [425]; CP-1; LIFE-1; PARA; WC-1; NYDN)
- Angelo Bertelli, Notre Dame (CP-2 [as hb])
- Billy Hillenbrand, Indiana (CP-2, LIFE-2)
- Bill Sewell, Washington State (AP-3; NEA-3)

=== Halfbacks ===
- Bruce Smith, Minnesota (College Football Hall of Fame) (AAB-1; AP-1; CO; INS-1; NEA-2; NW; SN; UP-1 [467]; CP-1; NYS-1; LIFE; PARA; WC-1, LIFE-1; NYDN)
- Frank Sinkwich, Georgia (College Football Hall of Fame) (AAB-1; AP-1; INS-2; LIB; NEA-3; SN; UP-1 [399]; CP-1; LIFE; WC-1, LIFE-1)
- Bill Dudley, Virginia (College and Pro Football Hall of Fame) (AP-1; CO; INS-2; LIB [qb]; NEA-2; NW; UP-1 [qb, 598]; CP-2; NYS-1 [as qb], LIFE-3)
- Jack Crain, Texas (AP-2; UP-2 [373]; NEA-2; CP-3 [as qb]; LIFE-1; NYDN)
- Jimmy Nelson, Alabama (AP-3; NEA-3; CP-3)
- Derace Moser, Texas A&M (AP-2; INS-2; NEA-1; CP-3)
- Jack Jenkins, Vanderbilt (AP-3)
- Bill Busik, Navy (LIFE-2)
- Angelo Bertelli, Notre Dame (LIFE-2)
- Hank Mazur, Army (LIFE-3)

=== Fullbacks ===
- Bob Westfall, Michigan (College Football Hall of Fame) (AAB-1; AP-2; CO; INS-1; LIB; NEA-1; NW; SN; UP-1 [467]; CP-1; NYS-1; PARA; WC-1, LIFE-3; NYDN)
- Steve Lach, Duke (College Football Hall of Fame) (AP-2; INS-1 [hb]; LIB [hb]; NEA-1; UP-2 [hb, 249]; CP-2; NYS-1 [as hb]; PARA; LIFE-2)
- Steve Filipowicz, Fordham (AP-3; UP-2 [211], LIFE-3)
- John Grigas, Holy Cross (INS-2; NEA-3)
- Merle Hapes, Ole Miss (NEA-2)
- Pete Layden, Texas (CP-3)

== Key ==
Bold = Consensus All-American

- -1 – First-team selection
- -2 – Second-team selection
- -3 – Third-team selection

=== Official selectors ===
- AAB = All-America Board of Football, having Pop Warner as its chairman, selected by 48 football coaches on "the long-established All-America Board of Football, a group of professional selectors speaking for all states, all conferences, all sections of the football world"
- AP = Associated Press based on "a nation-wide survey of expert opinion"
- CO = Collier's Weekly, "the pioneer of the all-star field", selected by Grantland Rice and published in the December 13 issue of Collier's
- INS = International News Service, selected from a ballot of INS bureaus
- LIB = Liberty magazine, an "All-Players All-America team" based on polling of 2,000 varsity football players from over 100 leading colleges, asking them to select the best players against whom they played
- NEA = NEA Sports Syndicate, selected "with the aid of coaches, scouts, officials and football writers"
- NW = Newsweek
- SN = The Sporting News
- UP = United Press, based on voting from "sports and football writers from coast to coast"; point totals received by each player displayed in brackets

=== Other selectors ===
- CP = Central Press Association, also known as the "Captains' All-American team", "picked by a staff of experts after culling the selections of the nation's football captains"
- LIFE = Life magazine selected by sports announcer Bill Stern
- NYS = New York Sun, 17th year for the New York newspaper selecting its All-America team
- PARA = Paramount News, selected by Bill Slater, sports broadcaster and the primary voice of Paramount News reels beginning in 1936
- WC = Walter Camp Football Foundation
- NYDN = New York Daily News, fifth annual "All-America Sportswriters' All-America" based on polling of 100 sports departments in 48 states

== See also ==
- 1941 Little All-America college football team
- 1941 All-Big Six Conference football team
- 1941 All-Big Ten Conference football team
- 1941 All-Eastern football team
- 1941 All-Pacific Coast Conference football team
- 1941 All-SEC football team
- 1941 All-Southern Conference football team
- 1941 All-Southwest Conference football team
