= Jimmy Nelson (American football) =

American football player (1919–1986)

No. 95
- Position: Halfback

Personal information
- Born: July 26, 1919; Live Oak, Florida, U.S.
- Died: December 24, 1986 (aged 67); Encinitas, California, U.S.
- Listed height: 5 ft 11 in (1.80 m)
- Listed weight: 180 lb (82 kg)

Career information
- High school: Suwannee (Live Oak)
- College: Alabama (1938–1941)
- NFL draft: 1942: 19th round, 174th overall pick

Career history
- Miami Seahawks (1946)

Awards and highlights
- Third-team All-American (1941); 2× First-team All-SEC (1940, 1941); Second-team All-SEC (1939)

Career AAFC statistics
- Rushing yards: 163
- Rushing average: 4.2
- Receptions: 4
- Receiving yards: 20
- Total touchdowns: 2
- Stats at Pro Football Reference

James Guess Nelson (July 26, 1919 – December 24, 1986) was an American professional football running back. He played one season in the AAFC for the Miami Seahawks. Nelson played college football at Alabama, where he was part of the 1941 National Championship team. Though selected in the 19th round by the Chicago Cardinals in the 1942 NFL draft, he did not play professional football until 1946. Instead, he served at March Field during World War II.
