= 1941 Tennessee Volunteers football team =

American college football season

1941 Tennessee Volunteers football
- Conference: Southeastern Conference

Ranking
- AP: No. 18
- Record: 8–2 (3–1 SEC)
- Head coach: John Barnhill (1st season)
- Home stadium: Shields–Watkins Field

1941 Southeastern Conference football standings
	Conf.					Overall
Team		W		L			W		L
No. 16 Mississippi State $	4	–	0	–	1	8	–	1	–	1
No. 18 Tennessee	3	–	1	–	0	8	–	2	–	0
No. 20 Alabama	5	–	2	–	0	9	–	2	–	0
No. 14 Georgia	3	–	1	–	1	9	–	1	–	1
No. 17 Ole Miss	2	–	1	–	1	6	–	2	–	1
Vanderbilt	3	–	2	–	0	8	–	2	–	0
LSU	2	–	2	–	2	4	–	4	–	2
Tulane	2	–	3	–	0	5	–	4	–	0
Georgia Tech	2	–	4	–	0	3	–	6	–	0
Florida	1	–	3	–	0	4	–	6	–	0
Kentucky	0	–	4	–	0	5	–	4	–	0
Auburn	0	–	4	–	1	4	–	5	–	1
$ – Conference champion; Rankings from AP Poll

The 1941 Tennessee Volunteers football team, also known as the Vols, was an American football team that represented the University of Tennessee as a member of the Southeastern Conference (SEC) in the 1941 college football season. In their first season under head coach John Barnhill, the Volunteers compiled an 8–2 record (3–1 against SEC opponents), finished second in the SEC, and outscored opponents by a total of 182 to 73. The team played its home games at Shields–Watkins Field in Knoxville, Tennessee.

== Schedule ==
Date	Opponent	Site	Result	Attendance	Source
September 20	Furman*	Shields–Watkins Field; Knoxville, TN	W 32–6	12,000	
October 4	at Duke*	Duke Stadium; Durham, NC	L 0–19	45,000	
October 11	Dayton*	Shields–Watkins Field; Knoxville, TN	W 26–0		
October 18	No. 4 Alabama	Shields–Watkins Field; Knoxville, TN (rivalry)	L 2–9	37,000	
October 25	Cincinnati*	Shields–Watkins Field; Knoxville, TN	W 21–6	7,000	
November 1	at LSU	Tiger Stadium; Baton Rouge, LA	W 13–6	30,000	
November 8	Howard (AL)*	Shields–Watkins Field; Knoxville, TN	W 28–6	4,000	
November 15	at No. 18 Boston College*	Alumni Field; Chestnut Hill, MA	W 14–7	32,000	
November 22	at Kentucky	McLean Stadium; Lexington, KY (rivalry)	W 20–7	14,000	
November 29	No. 12 Vanderbilt^{†}	Shields–Watkins Field; Knoxville, TN (rivalry)	W 26–7	30,000	
*Non-conference game; ^{†}Homecoming; Rankings from AP Poll released prior to the game

== Rankings ==
Ranking movements Legend: ██ Increase in ranking ██ Decrease in ranking — = Not ranked
	Week							
Poll	1	2	3	4	5	6	7	Final
AP	—	—	—	—	—	—	—	18

== 1942 NFL draft ==
Four Tennessee players were selected in the 1942 NFL draft.

Player	Position	Round	Pick	NFL club
Johnny Butler	Back	7	51	Pittsburgh Steelers
Ray Graves	Center	9	73	Philadelphia Eagles
Ike Peel	Back	15	132	Cleveland Rams
Don Edmiston	Tackle	17	160	Chicago Bears
