= Wally Butts =

American football player and coach (1905–1973)

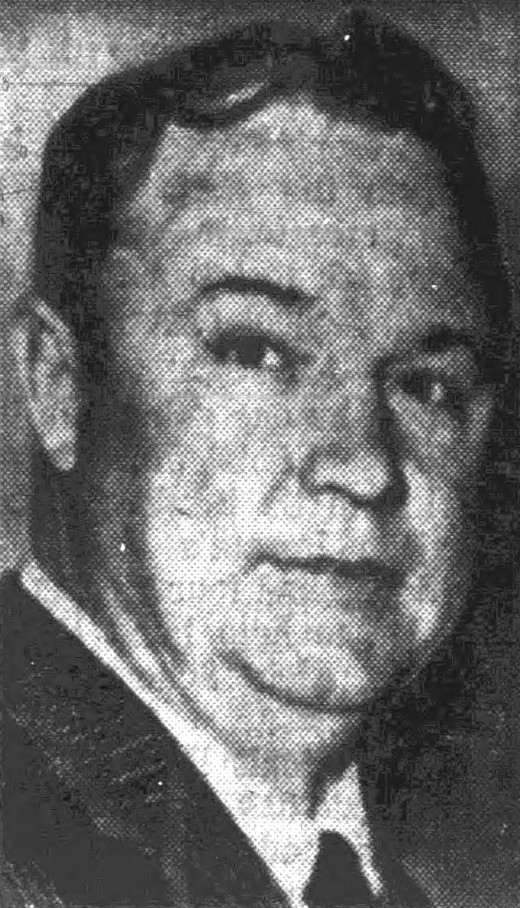
- Butts, circa 1942

Biographical details
- Born: February 7, 1905; Milledgeville, Georgia, U.S.
- Died: December 17, 1973 (aged 68); Athens, Georgia, U.S.

Playing career
- 1925–1927: Mercer
- Position: End

Coaching career (HC unless noted)
- 1929–1931: Madison A&M (GA)
- 1932–1934: Georgia Military
- 1935–1937: Louisville MS (KY)
- 1938: Georgia (assistant)
- 1939–1960: Georgia

Administrative career (AD unless noted)
- 1948–1963: Georgia

Head coaching record
- Overall: 140–86–9 (college)
- Bowls: 5–2–1

Accomplishments and honors

Championships
- 1 national (1942); 4 SEC (1942, 1946, 1948, 1959)

Awards
- 3× SEC Coach of the Year (1942, 1946, 1959); Florida–Georgia Hall of Fame
- College Football Hall of Fame; Inducted in 1997 (profile)

James Wallace Butts Jr. (February 7, 1905 – December 17, 1973) was an American college football player, coach, and athletics administrator. He served as the head coach at the University of Georgia from 1939 to 1960, compiling a record of 140–86–9. His Georgia Bulldogs football teams won a national championship in 1942 and four Southeastern Conference titles (1942, 1946, 1948, 1959). Butts was also the athletic director at Georgia from 1939 to 1963. He was inducted posthumously into the College Football Hall of Fame as a coach in 1997.

== Playing career ==
Butts was a 1929 graduate of Mercer University where he played college football under coach Bernie Moore, as well as baseball and basketball. He was an alumnus of Pi Kappa Phi fraternity.

== Coaching career ==
Butts never failed to turn out an undefeated championship team at the three high schools he coached before arriving at the University of Georgia in 1938. He coached at Madison (Ga.) A&M from 1928–31; Georgia Military College in Milledgeville, 1932–34; and Male High in Louisville, 1935–37. Butts lost only ten games in ten years of high school coaching. Butts came to the University of Georgia as an assistant to Joel Hunt in 1938. Hunt left after a 5–4–1 season to take over at the University of Wyoming and Butts was elevated to the position of head coach, which he held for 22 seasons through 1960.

Butts' assistants in his first year as head coach were Bill Hartman, Howell Hollis, Quinton Lumpkin, Jules V. Sikes, Forrest Towns, and Jennings B. Whitworth. During his tenure as head coach, Georgia won its first consensus national championship in 1942 and claimed another national title in 1946. Ralph Jordan, future head football coach at Auburn University, joined the Georgia coaching staff in October 1946 as an assistant line coach. Butts was a proponent of the passing game in an era of "three yards and a cloud of dust". He developed innovative, intricate pass routes that were studied by other coaches. He was often called "the little round man" as he was five feet, six inches tall and had a squat body.

Butts coached 1942 Heisman Trophy winner Frank Sinkwich and 1946 Maxwell Award winner Charley Trippi. The 1942 Georgia team won the Rose Bowl over UCLA, finished #2 in the AP Poll, and was named a national championship by a number of selectors. Butts' teams also won four Southeastern Conference championships (1942, 1946, 1948 and 1959). As head coach, Butts posted a 140–86–9 record (.615 winning percentage), including a bowl record of 5–2–1. Johnny Griffith, a former player and assistant coach to Butts, succeeded him as head coach from 1961–63.

== Later life and honors ==
Butts resigned as UGA's head football coach in December 1960. He remained as athletic director until February 1963, when he resigned after a scandal erupted over a magazine article alleging corrupt practices, which Butts stridently denied.

In 1963, Butts filed a libel lawsuit against The Saturday Evening Post after it ran "The Story of a College Football Fix" in its March 23, 1963, issue alleging that he and Alabama head coach Bear Bryant had conspired to fix an upcoming Georgia-Alabama game. The University of Georgia and Georgia Attorney General Eugene Cook conducted separate investigations. Curtis Publishing Co. v. Butts, as it ultimately became when it reached the Supreme Court, was a landmark case that expanded the definition of "public figures" in libel cases. The court ruled in his favor in 1967, and The Saturday Evening Post was ordered to pay $3.06 million to the Butts family in damages, the largest settlement awarded at its time in history.

This settlement was seen as a contributing factor among many others in the demise of the venerable Saturday Evening Post six years later. Both Butts and Bryant had sued for $10 million each. Bryant settled for $300,000. In 1986, Professor James Kirby of the University of Tennessee School of Law published Fumble: Bear Bryant, Wally Butts and the Great College Football Scandal, which argued that the courts had made the wrong decision. Kirby had been the Southeastern Conference's official observer at the trial.

Butts was inducted into the Georgia Sports Hall of Fame in 1966 and posthumously into the College Football Hall of Fame in 1997. Butts-Mehre Heritage Hall, athletic administration offices and sports museum at the University of Georgia, was built in honor of Butts and his predecessor as coach, Harry Mehre.

After ending his football career, Butts established a credit insurance business in Athens and Atlanta, where he became very successful. Butts died of a heart attack after returning from a walk in 1973. He was buried in Oconee Hill Cemetery in Athens, Georgia.

== Family ==
Butts was the son of James Wallace Butts Sr. (July 9, 1881 – January 2, 1959) and wife Anna Lou Hutchins (December 27, 1883 – March 10, 1908). Wally married Winifred Faye Taylor (July 12, 1907 – June 27, 1990) on February 19, 1929. They had three daughters, Faye, Jean and Nancy. Butts had numerous grandchildren and great grandchildren. Many members of the Butts family have gone on to support the University of Georgia in his honor.

== Head coaching record ==
=== College ===
Year	Team	Overall	Conference	Standing	Bowl/playoffs	Coaches^{#}	AP^{°}
Georgia Bulldogs (Southeastern Conference) (1939–1960)
1939	Georgia	5–6	1–3	8th			
1940	Georgia	5–4–1	2–3–1	7th			
1941	Georgia	9–1–1	3–1–1	4th	W Orange		14
1942	Georgia	11–1	5–1	1st	W Rose		2
1943	Georgia	6–4	0–3	4th			
1944	Georgia	7–3	4–2	T–3rd			
1945	Georgia	9–2	4–2	4th	W Oil		18
1946	Georgia	11–0	5–0	T–1st	W Sugar		3
1947	Georgia	7–4–1	3–3	T–4th	T Gator		
1948	Georgia	9–2	6–0	1st	L Orange		8
1949	Georgia	4–6–1	1–4–1	T–10th			
1950	Georgia	6–3–3	3–2–1	6th	L Presidential Cup		
1951	Georgia	5–5	2–4	T–9th			
1952	Georgia	7–4	4–3	5th			
1953	Georgia	3–8	1–5	T–10th			
1954	Georgia	6–3–1	3–2–1	5th			
1955	Georgia	4–6	2–5	11th			
1956	Georgia	3–6–1	1–6	12th			
1957	Georgia	3–7	3–4	9th			
1958	Georgia	4–6	2–4	10th			
1959	Georgia	10–1	7–0	1st	W Orange	5	5
1960	Georgia	6–4	4–3	6th			
Georgia:		140–86–9	66–60–5				
Total:		140–86–9					
National championship Conference title Conference division title or championship game berth
^{#}Rankings from final Coaches Poll.; ^{°}Rankings from final AP Poll.
