= Junie Hovious =

American football player (1919–1998)

No. 43
- Position: Halfback

Personal information
- Born: October 14, 1919; Vicksburg, Mississippi, U.S.
- Died: May 7, 1998 (aged 78); Oxford, Mississippi, U.S.
- Listed height: 5 ft 8 in (1.73 m)
- Listed weight: 180 lb (82 kg)

Career information
- High school: Carr Central (Vicksburg)
- College: Ole Miss (1938–1941)
- NFL draft: 1942: 18th round, 168th overall pick

Career history
- New York Giants (1945)

Awards and highlights
- NCAA punt return leader (1940)

Career NFL statistics
- Passing attempts: 46
- Passing completions: 22
- Completion percentage: 47.8%
- TD–INT: 4–5
- Passing yards: 373
- Passer rating: 65.1
- Stats at Pro Football Reference

John Alexander "Junie" Hovious, Jr. (October 4, 1919 – May 7, 1998) was an American professional football player. He played college football for the Ole Miss Rebels football team from 1939 to 1941 and professional football for the New York Giants in 1945.

Hovious was born in Vicksburg, Mississippi, in 1919. He played college football for the Ole Miss Rebels football team from 1939 to 1941. He also lettered in baseball and basketball for Ole Miss. During his three years playing for Ole Miss, he totaled 1,017 rushing yards, scored seven touchdowns, and returned 84 career punts for 1,142 yards and two touchdowns, including a 96-yard punt return against Georgia in 1940. In 1940, he led all NCAA major college players with 498 punt return yards. He was selected as a second-team All-SEC player in 1939 and 1941, and a first-team player in 1940.

He later played professional football in the National Football League, appearing in six games for the New York Giants during the 1945 NFL season. During his time with the Giants, he completed 22 of 46 passes for 373 yards and four touchdowns.

After retiring as a player, Hovious served as an assistant football coach at Ole Miss from 1946 to 1974. He was inducted into the Mississippi Sports Hall of Fame in 1967 and the Ole Miss Athletic Hall of Fame in 1987. He died in 1998 in Oxford, Mississippi.

== See also ==
- List of NCAA major college yearly punt and kickoff return leaders
