= 1942 Orange Bowl =

American college football game

- 8th Orange Bowl
- Burdine Stadium in Miami, Florida, hosted the Orange Bowl.
TCU Horned Frogs	Georgia Bulldogs
(7–2–1)	(8–1–1)
SWC	SEC
26	40
Head coach: Dutch Meyer	Head coach: Wally Butts
	AP 14
	1	2	3	4	Total
TCU	7	0	7	12	26
Georgia	19	14	7	0	40
- Date: January 1, 1942
- Season: 1941
- Stadium: Burdine Stadium
- Location: Miami, Florida
- Referee: John J. Lynch (SEC; split crew: SEC, SWC)
- Attendance: 35,786

The 1942 Orange Bowl matched the Georgia Bulldogs and the TCU Horned Frogs.

== Game summary ==
Frank Sinkwich was the highlight of the game in a Georgia beatdown of TCU. Sinkwich had three touchdown passes and one rushing touchdown for a combined total of 355 yards (rushing and passing), a record that stands to this day, overshadowing the game's 10 turnovers. Georgia had a 40–14 lead into the fourth quarter before TCU scored twice to narrow the lead, but Georgia ultimately won in the end, their first bowl win in their first bowl game.

Statistics	Georgia	TCU
First downs	12	8
Yards rushing	218	71
Yards passing	281	137
Total yards	499	208
Punts-Average	4-22.2	7-37.0
Fumbles-Lost	3-3	1-0
Interceptions	4	6
Penalties-Yards	7-54	2-24
