= Frank Sinkwich =

Croatian-Yugoslav American football player and coach (1920–1990)

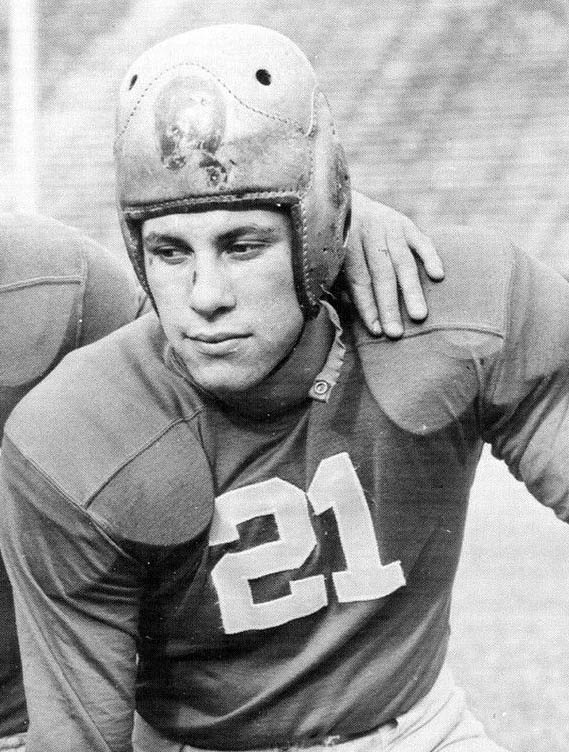
- Sinkwich, c. 1942

No. 21, 77, 76
- Position: Halfback

Personal information
- Born: October 10, 1920; Starjak, Yugoslavia (Note: Some sources state Sinkwich was born in McKees Rocks, Pennsylvania, or in Zagreb, Yugoslavia (currently Croatia).)
- Died: October 22, 1990 (aged 70); Athens, Georgia, U.S.
- Listed height: 5 ft 11 in (1.80 m)
- Listed weight: 190 lb (86 kg)

Career information
- High school: Chaney (Youngstown, Ohio, U.S.)
- College: Georgia (1940–1942)
- NFL draft: 1943: 1st round, 1st overall pick

Career history

Playing
- Detroit Lions (1943–1944); New York Yankees (1946–1947); Baltimore Colts (1947)

Coaching
- Tampa (1950–1951) Head coach

Awards and highlights
- NFL Most Valuable Player (1944); First-team All-Pro (1944); Second-team All-Pro (1943); National champion (1942); Heisman Trophy (1942); SN Player of the Year (1942); AP Athlete of the Year (1942); Unanimous All-American (1942); Consensus All-American (1941); SEC Player of the Year (1942); 3× First-team All-SEC (1940, 1941, 1942); Georgia Bulldogs No. 21 retired

Career NFL/AAFC statistics
- Rushing yards: 1,090
- Rushing average: 3.4
- Rushing touchdowns: 7
- Passing yards: 1,913
- TD–INT: 19–42
- Completion percentage: 40.2%
- Defensive interceptions: 4
- Punting average: 41.5
- Stats at Pro Football Reference

Head coaching record
- Regular season: 12–7–1 (.625)
- Postseason: 1–0 (1.000)
- Career: 13–7–1 (.643)
- College Football Hall of Fame

Frank Francis Sinkwich Sr. (October 10, 1920 – October 22, 1990) was a Croatian American football player and coach. He won the Heisman Trophy in 1942 while playing for the Georgia Bulldogs, making him the first recipient from the Southeastern Conference. In the course of a brief but celebrated career in professional football, Sinkwich was selected for the National Football League Most Valuable Player Award. He coached the Erie (PA) Vets semi-professional football team in 1949. Sinkwich was inducted into the College Football Hall of Fame in 1954.

== Early life ==
Sinkwich was of Croat origin. He was born in Starjak, Yugoslavia. World War I broke out in 1914, and as with many, his mother and the children remained there for the duration of the war. They returned to the US, going to Youngstown, Ohio when he was two years old, joining his father Ignac (Ignatius), who operated a grocery store. By 1940, the family operated a restaurant in Youngstown. His surname was originally spelled Sinković.

According to an article Sinkwich wrote in 1988, he grew to appreciate the value of competitiveness on the streets of Youngstown's west side. "I learned early in neighborhood pickup games that I had the desire to compete," he wrote. "When people ask why I succeeded in athletics, I always tell them that I didn't want to get beat."

== Football career ==
Sinkwich gained early recognition as a star athlete at Youngstown's Chaney High School. He went on to the University of Georgia to play under coach Wally Butts where he was a two-time All-America selection. In 1941, he led the nation in rushing yards with 209 carries for 1,103 yards. He set the NCAA single-season total offense record of 2,187 yards and led the Bulldogs to an 11–1 season in 1942, capturing the Southeastern Conference championship and a victory over UCLA in the 1943 Rose Bowl. That same year, the Washington D.C. Touchdown Club honored Sinkwich as "back of the year", and he was overwhelmingly voted the "Number 1 athlete for 1942" in the annual poll by the Associated Press over second-place finisher Ted Williams of the Boston Red Sox, a year in which Williams hit for baseball's triple crown.

The 1942 season was Sinkwich's first year of backfield-mate Charley Trippi. Georgia defeated Florida 75–0, the worst defeat in the history of Florida football. Sinkwich played with a broken jaw and kicked a field goal in a 19–3 defeat of Florida in 1941.

In his three-year college career, Sinkwich rushed for 2,271 yards, passed for 2,331 yards, and accounted for 60 touchdowns (30 rushing and 30 passing). Sinkwich earned his Bachelor of Science in Education (B.S.Ed.) from the university in 1943 and was a member of the Pi Kappa Alpha fraternity.

After his collegiate career, Sinkwich joined the United States Marine Corps; however, due to his flat feet, he received a medical discharge and proceeded to play with the Detroit Lions, who had selected him first overall in the 1943 NFL draft. In Detroit, he earned All-Pro honors in 1943–1944, as well as being named NFL MVP in 1944. (No Detroit Lions player would be named NFL MVP for over half a century: Barry Sanders in 1997.)

After his two years in Detroit, Sinkwich served in both the United States Merchant Marines and the United States Army Air Forces, but a knee injury received while playing for the Second Air Force Superbombers football team in 1945 hampered his playing career when he returned to professional football in 1946 and 1947. He coached the semi-professional Erie (PA) Vets football team in 1949. Sinkwich was inducted into the College Football Hall of Fame in 1954.

On October 26, 2024, he was posthumously inducted into the Croatian American Sports Hall of Fame.

== Legacy ==
Sinkwich died after a long illness in Athens, Georgia, at age 70. "We've lost one of the great legends in football history," said then Georgia athletic director Vince Dooley. "He was not only a great player but a wonderful person and citizen of Athens."

== Head coaching record ==
| Year | Team | Overall | Conference | Standing | Bowl/playoffs |
|---|---|---|---|---|---|
Tampa Spartans (Independent) (1950–1951)
| 1950 | Tampa | 5–4 | | | |
| 1951 | Tampa | 7–3–1 | | | W Brandeis Classic |
| Tampa: | | 12–7–1 | | | |
| Total: | | 12–7–1 | | | |

== See also ==
- List of NCAA major college football yearly rushing leaders
- List of NCAA major college football yearly total offense leaders
