= 1942 Cotton Bowl Classic =

- 6th Cotton Bowl Classic
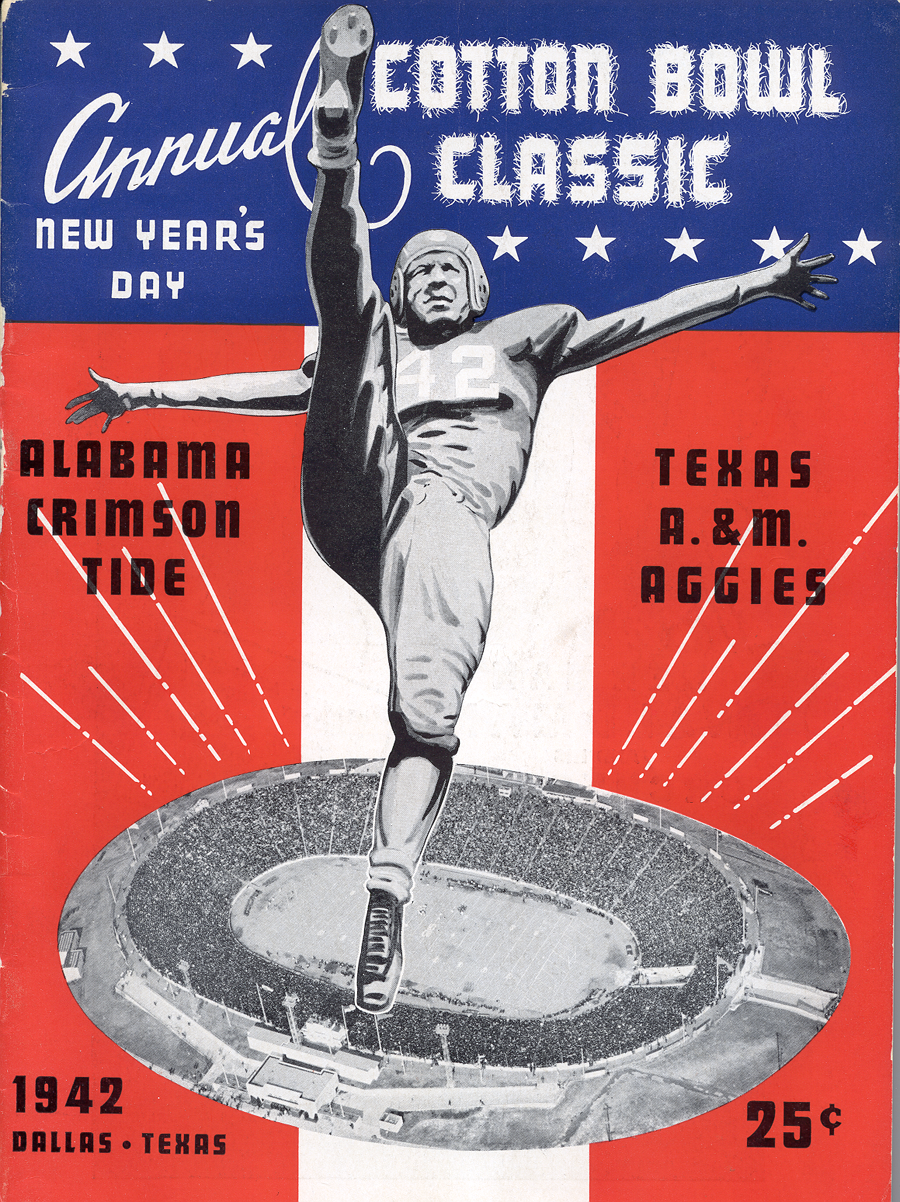
Alabama Crimson Tide	Texas A&M Aggies
(8–2)	(9–1)
SEC	SWC
29	21
Head coach: Frank Thomas	Head coach: Homer H. Norton
AP 20	AP 9
	1	2	3	4	Total
Alabama	0	7	13	9	29
Texas A&M	0	7	0	14	21
- Date: January 1, 1942
- Season: 1941
- Stadium: Cotton Bowl
- Location: Dallas, Texas
- MVP: T Martin Ruby (Texas A&M); HB Jimmy Nelson (Alabama); E Holt Rast (Alabama); T Don Whitmire (Alabama)
- Attendance: 38,000

The Cotton Bowl in Dallas, Texas, hosted the Cotton Bowl Classic.

The 1942 Cotton Bowl Classic, part of the 1941 bowl game season, took place on January 1, 1942, at the Cotton Bowl in Dallas, Texas. The competing teams were the Alabama Crimson Tide, representing the Southeastern Conference (SEC), and the Texas A&M Aggies, representing the Southwest Conference (SWC) as conference champions. Alabama won the game 29–21.

== Teams ==
=== Alabama ===
The 1941 Alabama squad finished the regular season with an 8–2 record. The Crimson Tide also finished third in SEC play with losses to Vanderbilt and conference champion Mississippi State. Following their victory over Miami, Alabama accepted an invitation to play in the Cotton Bowl on New Years Day on December 1. The appearance marked the first for Alabama in the Cotton Bowl, and the first bowl game played outside the Rose Bowl Game.

=== Texas A&M ===
Texas A&M finished the regular season with a 9–1 with its lone defeat coming against Texas. The appearance marked the second for the Aggies in the Cotton Bowl, as they defeated Fordham 13–12 in the 1941 game.

== Game summary ==
In a game statistically tilted toward the Aggies, Alabama won 29–21, after racing to a 29–7 lead. Alabama then inserted its third-string, allowing for Texas A&M's late scoring. Alabama had only one first down to A&M's 13; however, under the Southwest Conference rules in 1942, touchdown runs and pass plays were not counted as first downs; Alabama also had 59 rushing yards to A&M's 115; and 16 yards receiving to 194. The Crimson Tide prevailed through special teams play and intercepting seven Aggie passes in their victory.

Scoring summary

Quarter	Time	Drive			Team	Scoring information	Score	
Quarter	Time	Plays	Yards	TOP	Team	Scoring information	Alabama	Texas A&M
2					Texas A&M	Harold Cowley 12-yard touchdown reception from Leo Daniels, J.D. Webster kick good	0	7
2					Alabama	Russ Craft 8-yard touchdown run, George Hecht kick good	7	7
3					Alabama	Jimmy Nelson 72-yard punt return, George Hecht kick blocked	13	7
3					Alabama	Jimmy Nelson 21-yard touchdown run, George Hecht kick good	20	7
4					Alabama	31-yard field goal by George Hecht	23	7
4					Alabama	Interception returned 10 yards for touchdown by Holt Rast, George Hecht kick failed	29	7
4					Texas A&M	J.D. Webster 1-yard touchdown run, J.D. Webster kick good	29	14
4					Texas A&M	James Sterling 35-yard touchdown reception from R. Moser, J.D. Webster kick good	29	21
"TOP" = time of possession. For other American football terms, see Glossary of American football.							29	21
