= Merle Hapes =

American football player (1919–1994)

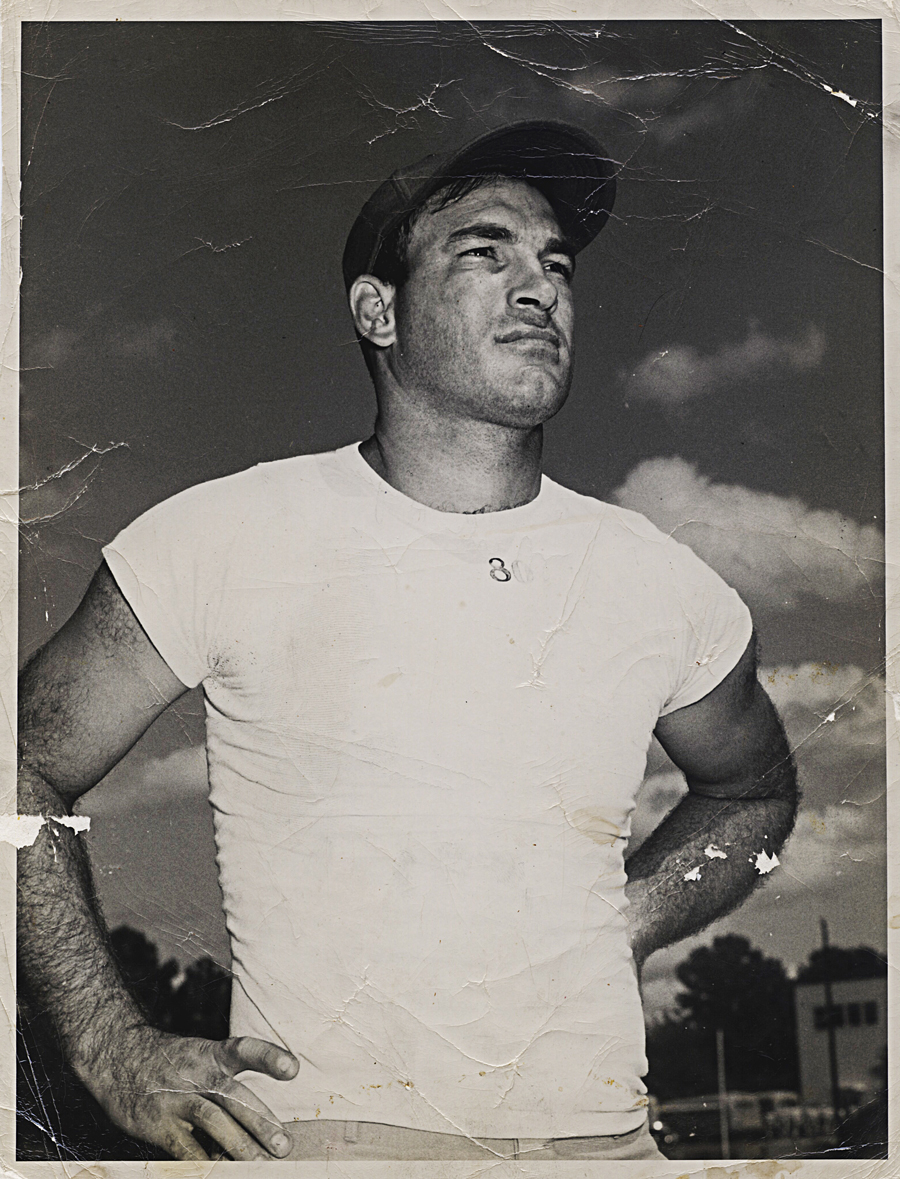
- Hapes seen in an early college photograph

No. 44, 30, 20, 84, 80
- Position: Fullback

Personal information
- Born: May 19, 1919; Garden Grove, California, U.S.
- Died: July 18, 1994 (aged 75); Biloxi, Mississippi, U.S.
- Listed height: 5 ft 10 in (1.78 m)
- Listed weight: 190 lb (86 kg)

Career information
- High school: Garden Grove
- College: Ole Miss (1938-1941)
- NFL draft: 1942: 1st round, 8th overall pick

Career history
- New York Giants (1942, 1946); Hamilton Tigers (1949); Hamilton Tiger-Cats (1953–1954)

Awards and highlights
- Grey Cup champion (1953); Second-team All-American (1941); Third-team All-American (1940); First-team All-SEC (1941); Second-team All-SEC (1940)

Career NFL statistics
- Rushing yards: 524
- Rushing average: 3.5
- Receptions: 13
- Receiving yards: 119
- Total touchdowns: 10
- Stats at Pro Football Reference

Merle Allison Hapes (May 19, 1919 – July 18, 1994) was an American professional football player who was a fullback in the National Football League (NFL) and the Interprovincial Rugby Football Union. He played two seasons for the New York Giants (1942, 1946), in between which he served in the Army Air Force during World War II, and then played five seasons for the Hamilton Tiger-Cats and their predecessor, winning the 1953 Grey Cup.

Hapes played fullback with the University of Mississippi from 1939 to 1941 and was then drafted in the first round of the 1942 NFL draft by the New York Giants.

He was the starting fullback for the Giants in 1941 and then served in the Army Air Corps from 1942 to 1946. Upon returning from the war, he returned to the Giants.

He and quarterback Frank Filchock were involved in a gambling scandal in 1946 in which they allegedly took bribes to fix the 1946 NFL Championship Game.

Since the betting scandal meant he was indefinitely suspended from playing professional football in the United States, he went to Canada to play in the Ontario Rugby Football Union. Hapes played one season for the Hamilton Tigers in 1949. The Tigers merged with the crosstown rival Hamilton Wildcats to become the Hamilton Tiger-Cats in 1950 with the merged team taking the Wildcats' place in the Interprovincial Rugby Football Union, a forerunner of the modern Canadian Football League. However, Hapes was injured for the entire season. For the next two seasons he was an assistant coach with the Tiger-Cats, but returned to play as a backup for two final seasons, winning the Grey Cup with Hamilton in 1953.

Hapes returned to the States and worked in the Civil Service and the Department of Defence until 1982. In 1993 Hapes was inducted into the Athletic Hall of Fame of Mississippi.

Hapes died on July 18, 1994.
