= Holt Rast =

American football player and politician

- Born: October 17, 1917; Portsmouth, Virginia, U.S.
- Died: November 22, 1998 (aged 81); Birmingham, Alabama, U.S.
- Occupation: Construction
- Football career

No. 34 – Alabama Crimson Tide
- Position: End

Personal information
- Born: October 17, 1917; Portsmouth, Virginia, U.S.
- Died: November 22, 1998 (aged 81); Birmingham, Alabama, U.S.

Career information
- College: Alabama (1941)

Awards and highlights
- Consensus All-American (1941); Second-team All-American (1940); 2× First-team All-SEC (1940, 1941)

Holt Rast (October 10, 1917 – November 22, 1998) was an American football player and entrepreneur who founded Rast Construction. Rast served in the United States Army from 1942 to 1946 and was later elected to serve in the Alabama House of Representatives from 1958 to 1966. He was appointed by Governor George Wallace to assist with the development of the Alabama Sports Hall of Fame in 1967 and founded Rast Construction in 1975.

== College football ==
Rast played end for coach Frank Thomas at the University of Alabama from 1939 to 1941. He was a unanimous All-American pick in 1941. Rast, along with teammates Don Whitmire and Jimmy Nelson, was selected MVP of the 1942 Cotton Bowl Classic. Rast scored on a 10-yard interception return during that 29–21 win over Texas A&M.

Rast was drafted by the Chicago Bears of the National Football League in 1942 in the 18th round with the 170th overall pick. Rast did not play for the Bears, however, he entered the U.S. Army after his graduation in 1942.

He was inducted into the Alabama Sports Hall of Fame in the Class of 1977 for football.

In 1994, he was selected by the Southeastern Conference as an SEC Football Legend.

== World War II ==
After graduating from the University of Alabama in 1942, Rast joined the U.S. Army. He was a captain in the 9th Division Combat Engineers, and was twice wounded. He was awarded the Purple Heart with oak leaf cluster, the Bronze Star Medal and Silver Star. Rast was honorably discharged in 1946 at the rank of Major.

== Business and political career ==
After World War II Rast served as President of Rast, Gregory and Dean Construction Engineers from 1946 to 1976. In 1976 the company was renamed Rast Construction where he served as Chairman until his retirement.

Rast was elected to membership in the Alabama House of Representatives from Jefferson County in 1957 and was reelected to that post in 1962 and served until 1966. He was selected by his peers as the chairman of the Jefferson County delegation.

Among the many civic responsibilities he agreed to accept over the years are membership on the Jefferson County Planning and Zoning Board, and President and Promoter of the Dixie Bowl.
