= Ernie Blandin =

American football player (1919–1968)

No. 48, 41, 68
- Position: Tackle

Personal information
- Born: June 21, 1919; Augusta, Kansas, U.S.
- Died: September 16, 1968 (aged 49); Randallstown, Maryland, U.S.
- Listed height: 6 ft 4 in (1.93 m)
- Listed weight: 248 lb (112 kg)

Career information
- High school: Leon (KS)
- College: Tulane (1938-1941)
- NFL draft: 1942: 5th round, 33rd overall pick

Career history
- Cleveland Browns (1946-1947); Baltimore Colts (1948-1950, 1953)

Awards and highlights
- 2× AAFC champion (1946, 1947); Consensus All-American (1941); First-team All-SEC (1941)

Career NFL/AAFC statistics
- Games played: 71
- Games started: 50
- Fumble recoveries: 2
- Stats at Pro Football Reference

Ernest Elmer Blandin (June 21, 1919 – September 16, 1968) was an American professional football player who was a tackle for six seasons with the Cleveland Browns and Baltimore Colts in the All-America Football Conference (AAFC) and later the National Football League (NFL).

Blandin was a standout as a tackle playing college football for the Tulane Green Wave, earning consensus All-American honors as a senior in 1941. Blandin was selected to play for the Philadelphia Eagles, but he instead joined the military and served in the Pacific theater of World War II.

Upon his discharge, he signed with the Browns of the AAFC and played on the team for two seasons. The Browns won the league championship in both of those years. Blandin was then sent to the Colts, where he remained through the 1950 season. He played one more year of professional football in 1953 with the second iteration of the Baltimore Colts.

== Biography ==
=== Early life ===
Ernie Blandin was born June 21, 1919, in Augusta, Kansas.

He played football from his days at Leon High School in Leon, Kansas, starting out as a fullback until being moved to tackle during his collegiate years. Blandin was a three-sport athlete in high school, winning a total of 11 letters in football, basketball, and track and field.

=== College career ===
Blandin attended Tulane University and played for the Tulane Green Wave football team between 1939 and 1941. He was part of an offensive line that was one of the largest in the country at the time: the linemen averaged 214 pounds.

Blandin was named a consensus All-American after the 1941 season, being named to no fewer than eight All-American teams, including the illustrious eleven chosen by United Press International. He also started for the East in the 1941 East-West Shrine Game.

Blandin was drafted by the Philadelphia Eagles in the 5th round of the 1942 NFL draft (33rd pick overall), but he delayed a professional football career to join the U.S. Navy as America's involvement in World War II intensified. Blandin served as a lieutenant in the Pacific theater, spending a year in the Marshall Islands and three months in Hawaii.

He did play on service teams during the war, including the Georgia Pre-Flight Skycrackers in 1942 and the Pearl Harbor All-Stars in 1945.

=== Professional career ===
After the war, Blandin re-enrolled at Tulane to finish work on his college degree.

He signed with the Cleveland Browns in 1946 as the team geared up to play its first season in the All-America Football Conference. He rotated at left tackle with Chet Adams in 1946 and 1947. The Browns won the AAFC championship both of those years.

By early 1948, the league was looking for ways to distribute talent more evenly across its teams, and several Browns players, including Blandin, were sent to the AAFC's Baltimore Colts to help the struggling team. Paul Brown, Cleveland's coach, called Blandin "one of my best men" and insisted that the AAFC's commissioner, Admiral Jonas H. Ingram, tell Blandin that the move was Ingram's decision.

Blandin played at left tackle for the Colts until 1950, when the franchise was terminated for financial reasons. He left football before returning for one additional season in 1953 with a new Baltimore Colts franchise established in that year to replace the defunct Dallas Texans of 1952.

=== Later life, death, and legacy ===
After retiring from football, Blandin made his home in Pikesville, Maryland where he worked in sales for the Fruehauf Trailer Corporation and the Ford Motor Company.

Blandin died September 16, 1968 in a nursing home in Randallstown, Maryland after a long illness. He was just 49 years old at the time of his death. His body was interred at Baltimore National Cemetery with friends encouraged to make donations to the American Cancer Society in lieu of flowers at the time of his funeral.

Blandin was inducted into the Greater New Orleans Sports Hall of Fame in 1987. He is also a member of Tulane's sports hall of fame.
