= Jack Jenkins (American football) =

American football player (1921–1982)

No. 38
- Position: Running back

Personal information
- Born: May 6, 1921; Texarkana, Texas, U.S.
- Died: April 30, 1982 (aged 60); Florence, Alabama, U.S.
- Listed height: 6 ft 1 in (1.85 m)
- Listed weight: 206 lb (93 kg)

Career information
- High school: Texas (Texarkana)
- College: Vanderbilt
- NFL draft: 1943: 1st round, 10th overall pick

Career history
- Washington Redskins (1943, 1946–1947)

Awards and highlights
- Third-team All-American (1941); SEC Player of the Year (1941); 2× Jacobs Blocking Trophy (1941, 1942); 2× First-team All-SEC (1941, 1942)

Career NFL statistics
- Rushing yards: 274
- Rushing average: 3.3
- Touchdowns: 1
- Stats at Pro Football Reference

Jacque Sumpter Jenkins (May 6, 1921 – April 30, 1982) was an American professional football player who was a running back in the National Football League (NFL) for the Washington Redskins. He played college football for the Vanderbilt Commodores, earning All-SEC honors as a blocking back, and was selected in the first round (tenth overall) of the 1943 NFL draft.

While at Vanderbilt University, he set a school record for the most points scored in a season at 90, and a career with 147, records that stood for decades. His 1941 team had the best winning record of a Vanderbilt team 8–2, since 1928. That year he was a Collier's Magazine All-American and the Coach's poll SEC MVP. The next year he was first team All-SEC and finished his college career in the 1943 Blue-Gray game.

He played in the NFL in 1943, but then had his career interrupted by two years of service during World War II, before returning to the NFL for two more seasons.

After his pro career was over he coached at Vanderbilt for some time before becoming a sales agent for Mizell Brothers, Co.

He died on April 30, 1982 in Florence, Alabama.
