= John Wyhonic =

American football player (1919–1989)

No. 66, 33
- Position: Guard

Personal information
- Born: December 23, 1919; Tiltonsville, Ohio, U.S.
- Died: July 19, 1989 (aged 69); Arcadia, Florida, U.S.
- Listed height: 6 ft 0 in (1.83 m)
- Listed weight: 213 lb (97 kg)

Career information
- High school: Connorville (Connorville, Ohio)
- College: Alabama
- NFL draft: 1942: 14th round, 123rd overall pick

Career history
- Philadelphia Eagles (1946–1947); Buffalo Bills (1948–1949)

Career NFL + AAFC statistics
- Games played: 39
- Games started: 5
- Fumble recoveries: 1
- Stats at Pro Football Reference

John N. Wyhonic (December 23, 1919 – July 19, 1989) was an American football guard who played in the National Football League (NFL) for the Philadelphia Eagles from 1946–1947 and in the All-America Football Conference (AAFC) for the Buffalo Bills from 1948–1949. After playing college football for Alabama, he was drafted by the Eagles in the 14th round (123rd overall) of the 1942 NFL draft. After serving in World War II for the Navy, he rejoined the Eagles in 1946.
