= 1941 All-SEC football team =

American college football all-star team

The 1941 All-SEC football team consists of American football players selected to the All-Southeastern Conference (SEC) chosen by various selectors for the 1941 college football season. Mississippi State won the conference.

== All-SEC selections ==
=== Ends ===
- Holt Rast, Alabama (AP-1, UP-1)
- Fergie Ferguson, Florida (AP-2, UP-1)
- George Webb, Georgia Tech (AP-2)
- Bill Hornick, Tulane (AP-3)
- George Poschner, Georgia (AP-3)

=== Tackles ===
- Ernie Blandin, Tulane (AP-1, UP-1)
- Bill Arnold, Miss. St. (AP-2, UP-1)
- Bill Eubanks, Ole Miss (AP-1)
- Charles Sanders, Georgia Tech (AP-2)
- Milton Hull, Florida (AP-3)
- Chet Kozel, Ole Miss (AP-3)

=== Guards ===
- Homer "Larry" Hazel, Jr., Ole Miss (AP-1, UP-1)
- John Wyhonic, Alabama (AP-1, UP-1)
- Jack Tittle, Tulane (AP-2)
- Oscar Britt, Ole Miss (AP-2)
- Walter Ruark, Georgia (AP-3)
- George Hecht, Alabama (AP-3)

=== Centers ===
- Bob Gude, Vanderbilt (AP-1, UP-1)
- Bernie Lipkis, LSU (AP-2)
- Ray Graves, Tennessee (College Football Hall of Fame) (AP-3)

=== Quarterbacks ===
- Lloyd Cheatham, Auburn (AP-2, UP-1)

=== Halfbacks ===
- Jimmy Nelson, Alabama (AP-1, UP-1)
- Frank Sinkwich, Georgia (College Football Hall of Fame) (AP-1, UP-1)
- Merle Hapes, Ole Miss (AP-1)
- John Hovious, Ole Miss (AP-2)
- John Black, Miss. St. (AP-2)
- Walter McDonald, Tulane (AP-2)
- Cliff Kimsey, Georgia (AP-3)
- Tommy Harrison, Florida (AP-3)
- Bob Glass, Tulane (AP-3)
- Noah Mullins, Kentucky (AP-3)

=== Fullbacks ===
- Jack Jenkins, Vanderbilt (AP-1, UP-1)

== Key ==
AP = Associated Press

UP = United Press.

Bold = Consensus first-team selection by both AP and UP

== See also ==
- 1941 College Football All-America Team
