= List of Tennessee Volunteers in the NFL draft =

This is a list of Tennessee Volunteers selected in the NFL Draft.

== Key ==
B	Back	K	Kicker	NT	Nose tackle
C	Center	LB	Linebacker	FB	Fullback
DB	Defensive back	P	Punter	HB	Halfback
DE	Defensive end	QB	Quarterback	WR	Wide receiver
DT	Defensive tackle	RB	Running back	G	Guard
E	End	T	Offensive tackle	TE	Tight end

	= Pro Bowler
	= MVP
	= Hall of Famer
†	= Supplemental draft

== Players ==
Year	Round	Pick	Overall	Team	Name	Position
1936	4	9	36	Giants	Gene Rose	E
1937	6	2	52	Cardinals	Phil Dickens	RB
1939	10	6	86	Bears	Walt Wood	B
1939	11	1	91	Cardinals	Bowden Wyatt	E
1940	1	1	1	Cardinals	George Cafego	QB
1940	6	6	46	Lions	Jim Rike	C
1940	11	5	95	Rams	Boyd Clay	T
1940	13	8	118	Redskins	Sam Bartholomew	FB
1940	14	4	124	Dodgers	Len Coffman	B
1941	2	4	14	Rams	Abe Shires	T
1941	3	2	17	Cardinals	Bob Foxx	RB
1941	6	2	42	Steelers	Bob Suffridge	G
1941	6	10	50	Redskins	Ed Cifers	E
1942	7	1	51	Steelers	Johnny Butler	B
1942	9	3	73	Eagles	Ray Graves	C
1942	15	2	132	Rams	Ike Peel	B
1942	17	10	160	Bears	Don Edmiston	T
1943	4	4	29	Cardinals	Al Hust	E
1944	2	3	14	Lions	Bob Cifers	RB
1944	15	7	149	Redskins	Jim Gaffney	QB
1944	15	9	151	Steelers	Jim Myers	G
1944	15	10	152	Rams	Frank Hubbell	E
1945	4	1	28	Cardinals	Bob Dobelstein	G
1945	7	11	65	Packers	Casey Stephenson	B
1945	9	5	81	Rams	Dick Huffman	T
1945	10	2	89	Steelers	Art Brandau	C
1945	10	3	90	Dodgers	Roy Cross	E
1945	12	10	119	Giants	Billy Bevis	B
1945	23	10	240	Giants	Jim Chadwell	T
1945	24	6	247	Lions	Russ Morrow	C
1946	5	7	37	Eagles	Walt Slater	RB
1946	7	1	51	Cardinals	Pat Lenshan	E
1946	26	1	241	Cardinals	Jim Vugrin	G
1946	28	8	268	Eagles	Bob Long	B
1947	9	8	73	Rams	Max Partin	B
1947	15	5	130	Packers	Denny Crawford	G
1947	16	4	139	Redskins	Billy Gold	B
1947	27	1	246	Lions	Bill Hillman	B
1948	30	10	285	Cardinals	Jim Powell	E
1949	13	1	122	Lions	Al Russas	E
1949	14	10	141	Eagles	Bobby Lund	B
1950	15	2	185	Bulldogs	Norm Messeroll	T
1951	5	11	61	Giants	Jack Stroud	T
1951	10	10	120	Bears	J. W. Sherrill	B
1951	15	7	178	Lions	Jim Hill	B
1951	17	11	206	Giants	Bud Sherrod	E
1951	26	6	309	Steelers	Pug Pearman	G
1951	30	5	356	Steelers	John Gruble	E
1952	1	10	10	Browns	Bert Rechichar	DB
1952	5	12	61	Rams	Gordon Polofsky	B
1952	9	5	102	Steelers	Hal Payne	B
1952	12	7	140	Bears	Andy Kozar	B
1952	16	1	182	Yanks	Vince Kaseta	E
1952	17	9	202	Lions	Hank Lauricella	B
1952	21	7	248	Bears	Ted Daffer	G
1952	26	2	303	Packers	Charlie Stokes	T
1953	1	11	11	Browns	Doug Atkins	DE
1953	10	5	114	Steelers	Frank Holohan	T
1953	24	6	283	Packers	Jim Haslam	T
1953	24	7	284	49ers	Ed Morgan	B
1953	25	8	297	Eagles	Johnny Michels	G
1953	29	2	339	Redskins	Pat Shires	B
1953	30	9	358	Browns	Andy Myers	G
1954	8	10	95	Browns	Bill Barbish	B
1954	10	6	115	Steelers	Bob Fisher	T
1955	3	11	36	Lions	Darris McCord	DE
1955	14	10	167	Bears	Ed Nickla	LB
1955	18	11	216	Lions	Pat Oleksiak	B
1955	20	9	238	Eagles	Jimmy Wade	B
1955	27	10	323	Bears	Joel Kinley	G
1955	30	11	360	Browns	Lamar Leachman	C
1956	5	1	50	Lions	Tom Tracy	RB
1956	12	10	143	Bears	Buddy Cruze	E
1957	2	11	24	Lions	John Gordy	G
1957	28	4	329	Steelers	Frank Kilinsky	T
1958	3	6	31	Redskins	Bill Anderson	TE
1958	6	2	63	Cardinals	Bobby Gordon	DB
1958	22	4	257	Bears	Al Carter	B
1958	24	8	285	Colts	Bobby Sandlin	B
1958	30	11	360	Lions	Tommy Bronson	B
1959	9	5	101	Lions	Carl Smith	B
1959	22	4	256	Lions	Lebron Shields	DE
1961	5	13	69	Browns	Mike Lucci	LB
1961	12	14	168	Eagles	Billy Majors	B
1961	20	13	279	Browns	Charlie Baker	T
1962	17	7	231	Bears	Glenn Glass	WR
1964	1	14	14	Bears	Dick Evey	T
1964	12	4	158	Redskins	Bob Zvolerin	T
1964	14	1	183	49ers	Ed Beard	LB
1965	1	6	6	Bears	Steve DeLong	DL
1965	17	3	227	Steelers	Whit Canale	DL
1966	3	8	40	Giants	Tom Fisher	LB
1966	4	4	52	Eagles	Frank Emanuel	LB
1966	8	5	115	Redskins	Stan Mitchell	RB
1966	11	5	160	Cowboys	Austin Denney	TE
1966	12	11	181	Vikings	Bob Petrella	DB
1966	16	6	235	Redskins	Hal Wantland	RB
1967	3	7	60	Lions	Paul Naumoff	LB
1967	4	1	81	Saints	Ron Widby	K
1967	8	14	199	Chargers	John Mills	WR
1967	9	20	231	Eagles	Harold Stancell	DB
1967	16	12	405	Jets	Doug Archibald	DB
1968	1	2	2	Bengals	Bob Johnson	C
1968	6	17	155	Bengals	Warren Dewey	QB
1968	6	26	164	Packers	Walter Chadwick	RB
1968	7	7	172	Dolphins	John Boynton	OT
1968	8	17	209	Chargers	Elliot Grammage	TE
1968	15	13	394	Eagles	Joe Graham	OG
1968	16	5	413	Patriots	Charley Fulton	RB
1968	17	9	445	Vikings	Bill Hull	OG
1969	2	23	49	Cowboys	Richmond Flowers	WR
1969	5	24	128	Dolphins	Karl Kremser	K
1969	13	10	327	Oilers	Richard Pickens	RB
1969	15	2	366	Falcons	Jim Weatherford	DB
1969	15	11	375	Dolphins	Chick McGeehan	WR
1969	15	22	386	Cowboys	Bill Justus	DB
1970	1	22	22	Rams	Jack Reynolds	LB
1970	3	21	73	Cowboys	Steve Kiner	LB
1970	9	19	227	Lions	Herman Weaver	P
1970	10	23	257	Cowboys	Pete Athas	DB
1970	15	23	387	Cowboys	Ken DeLong	TE
1970	16	2	392	Steelers	Frank Yanossy	DT
1971	9	12	220	Bears	Lester McClain	WR
1971	14	2	340	Saints	Bobby Scott	QB
1971	17	13	429	Chargers	Chip Kell	C
1972	3	24	76	Eagles	Bobby Majors	DB
1972	5	18	122	Browns	George Hunt	K
1972	6	18	148	49ers	Jackie Walker	DB
1972	6	20	150	Saints	Curt Watson	RB
1972	6	25	155	Dolphins	Ray Nettles	LB
1972	12	22	308	Colts	Gary Theiler	TE
1972	16	7	397	Saints	Joe Balthrop	G
1973	3	10	62	Colts	Jamie Rotella	LB
1973	8	5	187	Bears	Conrad Graham	DB
1973	10	20	254	Cowboys	Carl Johnson	LB
1973	11	5	265	Bills	Richard Earl	OT
1974	3	7	59	Chargers	Bill Rudder	RB
1974	5	10	114	Bengals	Haskel Stanback	RB
1974	8	17	199	Browns	Eddie Brown	DB
1974	10	26	260	Dolphins	Gary Valbuena	QB
1974	16	23	413	Cowboys	Gene Killian	G
1975	10	24	258	Vikings	Neil Clabo	P
1975	12	20	306	Patriots	Conredge Holloway	DB
1975	13	2	314	Giants	Ricky Townsend	K
1975	15	25	389	Raiders	Paul Careathers	RB
1976	2	25	53	Rams	Ron McCartney	LB
1976	16	2	433	Buccaneers	Tommy West	LB
1977	1	25	25	Patriots	Stanley Morgan	WR
1977	4	27	111	Seahawks	Larry Seivers	WR
1977	4	28	112	Raiders	Mickey Marvin	G
1977	5	23	135	Cardinals	Andy Spiva	LB
1978	3	20	76	Steelers	Craig Colquitt	P
1978	8	11	205	Browns	Jesse Turnbow	DT
1978	9	28	250	Cowboys	Russ Williams	DB
1978	10	11	261	Browns	Brent Watson	OT
1978	11	3	281	Jets	Pat Ryan	QB
1979	1	27	27	Cowboys	Robert Shaw	C
1979	3	2	58	Rams	Jeff Moore	WR
1979	12	8	311	Saints	Kelsey Finch	RB
1980	1	14	14	Patriots	Roland James	DB
1980	3	21	77	49ers	Craig Puki	LB
1981	3	18	74	Vikings	Tim Irwin	OT
1981	5	26	137	Cowboys	Danny Spradlin	LB
1981	7	8	174	Eagles	Alan Duncan	K
1981	10	10	258	Bengals	Hubert Simpson	RB
1981	12	6	310	Buccaneers	Brad White	DT
1982	1	11	11	Chiefs	Anthony Hancock	WR
1982	4	28	111	Patriots	Brian Ingram	LB
1982	6	14	153	Redskins	Lemont Jeffers	LB
1982	10	14	265	Redskins	Terry Daniels	DB
1983	1	18	18	Bears	Willie Gault	WR
1983	2	19	47	Patriots	Darryal Wilson	WR
1983	3	11	67	Lions	Mike Cofer	DE
1983	4	20	104	Packers	Mike Miller	WR
1983	11	2	281	Giants	Lee Jenkins	DB
1983	12	8	315	Chiefs	Ken Jones	OT
1984	1	17	17	Cardinals	Clyde Duncan	WR
1984	4	1	85	Oilers	Mark Studaway	DE
1984	6	27	167	Redskins	Curt Singer	OT
1984	10	18	270	Seahawks	Randall Morris	RB
1984	12	5	313	Packers	Lenny Taylor	WR
1984	12	19	327	Lions	Glenn Streno	C
1984 †	1	4	4	Eagles	Reggie White	DE
1985	1	24	24	Saints	Alvin Toles	LB
1985	2	15	43	Bengals	Carl Zander	LB
1985	5	25	137	Seahawks	Johnnie Jones	RB
1985	7	27	195	Dolphins	Fuad Reveiz	K
1985	10	23	275	Raiders	Reggie McKenzie	LB
1985	11	10	290	Redskins	Raleigh McKenzie	G
1985	12	10	318	Chargers	Tony Simmons	DE
1986	1	21	21	Bengals	Tim McGee	WR
1986	6	28	166	Bears	Jeff Powell	RB
1986	7	4	170	Cardinals	Eric Swanson	WR
1986	7	24	190	Colts	Tommy Sims	DB
1986	8	10	204	Bengals	David Douglas	G
1987	2	24	52	Raiders	Bruce Wilkerson	OT
1987	9	10	233	Steelers	Joey Clinkscales	WR
1987	10	11	262	Cowboys	Dale Jones	LB
1987	11	23	302	Patriots	Carlos Reveiz	K
1988	1	9	9	Raiders	Terry McDaniel	DB
1988	1	15	15	Chargers	Anthony Miller	WR
1988	4	4	86	Buccaneers	John Bruhin	G
1988	5	4	113	Buccaneers	William Howard	RB
1988	8	19	212	Dolphins	Harry Galbreath	G
1988	9	17	238	Chargers	Joey Howard	OT
1989	1	28	28	49ers	Keith DeLong	LB
1989	6	1	140	Raiders	Jeff Francis	QB
1990	2	5	30	Buccaneers	Reggie Cobb	RB
1990	3	21	74	Vikings	Marion Hobby	DE
1990	4	18	99	Oilers	Eric Still	G
1990	7	9	174	Lions	Tracy Hayworth	LB
1990	7	25	190	Rams	Kent Elmore	P
1990	8	12	205	Dolphins	Thomas Woods	WR
1991	1	7	7	Buccaneers	Charles McRae	OT
1991	1	8	8	Eagles	Antone Davis	OT
1991	1	12	12	Cowboys	Alvin Harper	WR
1991	3	26	81	Packers	Chuck Webb	RB
1991	5	17	128	Seahawks	Harlan Davis	DB
1991	5	23	134	Bears	Anthony Morgan	WR
1991	8	3	198	Cardinals	Greg Amsler	RB
1991	10	4	254	Chargers	Roland Poles	RB
1991	11	1	279	Patriots	Vince Moore	WR
1992	1	20	20	Chiefs	Dale Carter	DB
1992	1	23	23	Chargers	Chris Mims	DE
1992	2	3	31	Bengals	Carl Pickens	WR
1992	2	23	51	Falcons	Chuck Smith	DE
1992	3	24	80	Bears	Jeremy Lincoln	DB
1992	4	25	109	Cowboys	Tom Myslinski	G
1992	9	16	240	Packers	Shazzon Bradley	DT
1992	9	23	247	Oilers	Bernard Dafney	OT
1992	10	18	270	Falcons	Darryl Hardy	LB
1993	1	27	27	49ers	Todd Kelly	DE
1993	8	7	203	Cowboys	Dave Thomas	DB
1994	1	3	3	Redskins	Heath Shuler	QB
1994	2	13	42	Eagles	Charlie Garner	RB
1994	3	22	87	49ers	Cory Fleming	WR
1994	3	28	93	Lions	Shane Bonham	DT
1994	5	21	152	Jets	Horace Morris	LB
1995	1	19	19	Jaguars	James Stewart	RB
1995	2	9	41	Falcons	Ronald Davis	DB
1995	4	6	104	Chargers	Aaron Hayden	RB
1995	4	35	133	Giants	Ben Talley	LB
1995	6	20	191	Panthers	Jerry Colquitt	QB
1995	7	4	212	Cardinals	Billy Williams	WR
1996	2	18	48	Oilers	Jason Layman	G
1996	2	25	55	Ravens	DeRon Jenkins	DB
1996	5	18	150	Dolphins	Shane Burton	DT
1996	6	13	180	Buccaneers	Nilo Silvan	WR
1996	6	15	182	Giants	Scott Galyon	LB
1996	6	27	194	Eagles	Steve White	DE
1996	7	4	213	Broncos	Leslie Ratliffe	OT
1996	7	32	241	Chiefs	Jeff Smith	C
1997	2	16	46	Oilers	Joey Kent	WR
1997	3	4	64	Ravens	Jay Graham	RB
1997	5	15	145	Jets	Raymond Austin	DB
1998	1	1	1	Colts	Peyton Manning	QB
1998	1	20	20	Lions	Terry Fair	DB
1998	1	30	30	Broncos	Marcus Nash	WR
1998	3	4	65	Rams	Leonard Little	DE
1998	3	29	90	Packers	Jonathan Brown	DE
1998	7	11	200	Broncos	Trey Teague	C
1998	7	15	204	Saints	Andy McCullough	WR
1998	7	42	231	Colts	Corey Gaines	DB
1999	1	31	31	Broncos	Al Wilson	LB
1999	2	22	53	Bills	Peerless Price	WR
1999	3	25	86	Bills	Shawn Bryson	RB
1999	6	1	170	Seahawks	Steve Johnson	DB
1999	6	12	181	Redskins	Jeff Hall	K
1999	7	44	250	Colts	Corey Terry	DE
2000	1	5	5	Ravens	Jamal Lewis	RB
2000	1	12	12	Jets	Shaun Ellis	DE
2000	2	10	41	Cardinals	Raynoch Thompson	LB
2000	2	13	44	Packers	Chad Clifton	OT
2000	2	18	49	Cowboys	Dwayne Goodrich	DB
2000	2	20	51	Buccaneers	Cosey Coleman	G
2000	2	26	57	Panthers	Deon Grant	DB
2000	3	9	71	Cardinals	Darwin Walker	DT
2000	5	34	163	Steelers	Tee Martin	QB
2001	2	27	58	Bills	Travis Henry	RB
2001	3	11	73	Jaguars	Eric Westmoreland	LB
2001	5	11	142	Jaguars	David Leaverton	P
2001	6	6	169	49ers	Cedrick Wilson	WR
2001	6	35	198	Packers	David Martin	WR
2002	1	9	9	Jaguars	John Henderson	DT
2002	1	13	13	Saints	Donté Stallworth	WR
2002	1	15	15	Titans	Albert Haynesworth	DT
2002	3	1	66	Texans	Fred Weary	C
2002	3	15	80	Falcons	Will Overstreet	DE
2002	4	21	119	Buccaneers	Travis Stephens	RB
2002	5	24	159	Redskins	Andre Lott	DB
2002	6	20	192	Redskins	Reggie Coleman	OT
2002	7	45	256	49ers	Teddy Gaines	DB
2002	7	49	260	Bills	Dominique Stevenson	LB
2003	2	17	49	Dolphins	Eddie Moore	OLB
2003	3	1	65	Bengals	Kelley Washington	WR
2003	3	5	69	Cowboys	Jason Witten	TE
2003	3	28	92	Chiefs	Julian Battle	CB
2003	5	11	146	Ravens	Aubrayo Franklin	DT
2003	5	27	162	Colts	Keyon Whiteside	ILB
2003	6	10	183	Seahawks	Rashad Moore	DT
2003	7	24	238	Falcons	Demetrin Veal	DE
2004	5	4	136	Giants	Gibril Wilson	SS
2004	6	26	191	Titans	Troy Fleming	FB
2004	7	5	206	Buccaneers	Mark Jones	WR
2004	7	50	251	Packers	Scott Wells	C
2005	2	10	42	Cowboys	Kevin Burnett	OLB
2005	3	36	99	Chiefs	Dustin Colquitt	P
2005	6	8	182	Jets	Cedric Houston	RB
2006	1	16	16	Dolphins	Jason Allen	FS
2006	5	7	140	49ers	Parys Haralson	DE
2006	5	35	168	Eagles	Omar Gaither	OLB
2006	5	36	169	Titans	Jesse Mahelona	DT
2006	7	42	250	Redskins	Kevin Simon	OLB
2007	1	16	16	Packers	Justin Harrell	DT
2007	1	27	27	Saints	Robert Meachem	WR
2007	2	3	35	Buccaneers	Arron Sears	OG
2007	2	22	54	Chiefs	Turk McBride	DT
2007	3	20	84	Rams	Jonathan Wade	CB
2007	7	10	220	Saints	Marvin Mitchell	ILB
2008	1	10	10	Patriots	Jerod Mayo	ILB
2008	3	13	76	Chiefs	Brad Cottam	TE
2008	5	29	162	Jets	Erik Ainge	QB
2009	1	18	18	Broncos	Robert Ayers	LB
2010	1	5	5	Chiefs	Eric Berry	FS
2010	1	26	26	Cardinals	Dan Williams	DT
2010	2	27	59	Browns	Montario Hardesty	RB
2010	4	31	129	Colts	Jacques McClendon	OG
2010	5	20	151	Steelers	Chris Scott	OG
2010	5	37	168	Chargers	Jonathan Crompton	QB
2011	4	7	104	Buccaneers	Luke Stocker	TE
2011	5	17	148	Raiders	Denarius Moore	WR
2012	5	2	137	Broncos	Malik Jackson	DE
2013	1	29	29	Vikings	Cordarrelle Patterson	WR
2013	2	2	34	Titans	Justin Hunter	WR
2013	3	15	77	Dolphins	Dallas Thomas	G
2013	6	16	184	Raiders	Mychal Rivera	TE
2014	1	19	19	Dolphins	Ja'Wuan James	T
2014	6	17	193	Chiefs	Zach Fulton	G
2014	6	39	215	Steelers	Daniel McCullers	DT
2017	1	14	14	Eagles	Derek Barnett	DE
2017	3	3	67	Saints	Alvin Kamara	RB
2017	3	30	94	Steelers	Cameron Sutton	DB
2017	4	18	124	Lions	Jalen Reeves-Maybin	LB
2017	4	22	128	Bengals	Josh Malone	WR
2017	4	29	135	Steelers	Joshua Dobbs	QB
2018	3	21	85	Panthers	Rashaan Gaulden	DB
2018	6	2	176	Rams	John Kelly	RB
2018	6	24	198	Chiefs	Kahlil McKenzie	DT
2020	2	16	48	Seahawks	Darrell Taylor	DE
2020	7	3	217	49ers	Jauan Jennings	WR
2021	3	11	77	Chargers	Josh Palmer	WR
2021	6	42	226	Chiefs	Trey Smith	G
2022	2	17	49	Saints	Alontae Taylor	DB
2022	3	7	71	Bears	Velus Jones Jr.	WR
2022	5	32	175	Raiders	Matthew Butler	DT
2022	6	20	199	Panthers	Cade Mays	G
2022	6	25	204	Titans	Theo Jackson	DB
2023	1	10	10	Bears	Darnell Wright	T
2023	3	5	68	Lions	Hendon Hooker	QB
2023	3	10	73	Giants	Jalin Hyatt	WR
2023	3	11	74	Browns	Cedric Tillman	WR
2023	3	14	77	Rams	Byron Young	DE
2024	4	20	120	Dolphins	Jaylen Wright	RB
2024	6	17	193	Patriots	Joe Milton	QB
2024	6	35	211	Chiefs	Kamal Hadden	DB
2025	1	26	26	Falcons	James Pearce Jr.	DE
2025	2	31	63	Chiefs	Omarr Norman-Lott	DT
2025	4	6	108	Raiders	Dont'e Thornton	WR
2025	4	24	126	Browns	Dylan Sampson	RB
2026	2	5	37	Giants	Colton Hood	DB
2026	3	19	83	Panthers	Chris Brazzell II	WR
2026	4	1	101	Raiders	Jermod McCoy	DB
2026	5	7	147	Commanders	Joshua Josephs	DE
2026	7	6	222	Lions	Tyre West	DE

== Notable undrafted players ==
Note: No drafts held before 1936

Debut year	Player name	Position	Debut NFL/AFL team	Notes
1960	Joe Schaffer	LB	Buffalo Bills	—
1961	Cotton Letner	LB	Buffalo Bills	—
1961	Ken Frost	DT	Dallas Cowboys	—
1973	Larry Robinson	RB	Dallas Cowboys	—
1976	Steve Poole	LB	New York Jets	—
1981	Greg Gaines	LB	Seattle Seahawks	—
1983	Bill Bates	S	Dallas Cowboys	—
1983	John Warren	P	Dallas Cowboys	—
1985	Jimmy Colquitt	P	New York Giants	—
1985	Marc Hogan	DB	Green Bay Packers	—
1986	Jeff Smith	TE	Atlanta Falcons	—
1986	Chris White	S	Seattle Seahawks	—
1987	Joe Cofer	DB	Washington Redskins	—
1987	Sam Graddy	WR	Denver Broncos	—
1987	Tim Hendrix	TE	Chicago Bears	—
1987	Anthony Howard	DT	New York Giants	—
1987	Ian Howfield	K	Miami Dolphins	—
1987	Steve Knight	G	Dallas Cowboys	—
1987	Tony Robinson	QB	Washington Redskins	—
1987	Daryle Smith	T	Seattle Seahawks	—
1988	Richard Cooper	T	Seattle Seahawks	—
1988	Darrin Miller	LB	Seattle Seahawks	—
1989	Kevin Simons	T	Cleveland Browns	—
1993	J. J. McCleskey	DB	New Orleans Saints	—
1995	Tom Hutton	P	Philadelphia Eagles	—
1996	Bubba Miller	C	Philadelphia Eagles	—
1999	Bill Duff	DT	Cleveland Browns	—
2000	Phillip Crosby	FB	Buffalo Bills	—
2002	Bernard Jackson	DE	Washington Redskins	—
2002	Eric Parker	WR	Houston Texans	—
2003	Omari Hand	DE	San Diego Chargers	—
2004	Rashad Baker	S	Buffalo Bills	—
2004	Jabari Greer	DB	Buffalo Bills	—
2004	Anthony Herrera	G	Minnesota Vikings	—
2004	Constantin Ritzmann	DE	Buffalo Bills	—
2006	Tony McDaniel	DT	Jacksonville Jaguars	—
2006	Rob Smith	G/T	Cleveland Browns	—
2009	Britton Colquitt	P	Denver Broncos	—
2009	Arian Foster	RB	Houston Texans	—
2009	Ramon Foster	T	Pittsburgh Steelers	—
2010	Morgan Cox	LS	Baltimore Ravens	—
2012	Tauren Poole	RB	Carolina Panthers	—
2012	Matt Simms	QB	New York Jets	—
2013	Tyler Bray	QB	Kansas City Chiefs	—
2014	Michael Palardy	P	Oakland Raiders	—
2014	James Stone	C	Atlanta Falcons	—
2015	Justin Coleman	CB	Minnesota Vikings	—
2015	Matt Darr	P	Miami Dolphins	—
2015	Jordan Williams	LB	New York Jets	—
2016	Alex Ellis	TE	Tennessee Titans	—
2016	Curt Maggitt	LB	Indianapolis Colts	—
2017	Jason Croom	TE	Buffalo Bills	—
2018	Trevor Daniel	P	Houston Texans	—
2018	Emmanuel Moseley	CB	San Francisco 49ers	—
2018	A. J. Johnson	LB	Denver Broncos	—
2018	Kendal Vickers	DE	Pittsburgh Steelers	—
2019	Micah Abernathy	S	Minnesota Vikings	—
2019	Jakob Johnson	FB	New England Patriots	—
2019	Kyle Phillips	DT	New York Jets	—
2019	Shy Tuttle	DT	New Orleans Saints	—
2020	Marquez Callaway	WR	New Orleans Saints	—
2022	JaVonta Payton	WR	Arizona Cardinals	—
2023	Jeremy Banks	LB	Tampa Bay Buccaneers	—
2023	Princeton Fant	TE	Dallas Cowboys	—
2024	McCallan Castles	TE	Philadelphia Eagles	—
2024	Ramel Keyton	WR	Las Vegas Raiders	—
2024	Jaylen McCollough	S	Los Angeles Rams	—
2024	Jabari Small	RB	Tennessee Titans	—
2024	Dee Williams	CB/RS	Seattle Seahawks	—
2025	Will Brooks	S	Kansas City Chiefs	—
2026	Joey Aguilar	QB	Jacksonville Jaguars	—
2026	Dominic Bailey	DT	Houston Texans	—
2026	Bryson Eason	DT	San Francisco 49ers	—
2026	Miles Kitselman	TE	Detroit Lions	—
2026	Jalen McMurray	CB	Tennessee Titans	—
2026	Jaxson Moi	DL	Los Angeles Rams	—
2026	Will Wright	CB	Denver Broncos	—
