= Smarr =

Smarr is a surname. Notable people with the surname include:

- Larry Smarr (born 1948), American physicist
- Murders of Nicholas Smarr and Jody Smith

== See also ==
- Smarr, Georgia, unincorporated locality in Georgia, United States
