= Peppi Zellner =

American football player (born 1975)

No. 93, 94
- Position: Defensive end

Personal information
- Born: March 14, 1975 (age 51); Forsyth, Georgia, U.S.
- Listed height: 6 ft 5 in (1.96 m)
- Listed weight: 262 lb (119 kg)

Career information
- High school: Persons (Forsyth)
- College: Fort Valley State, Georgia Military College
- NFL draft: 1999: 4th round, 132nd overall pick

Career history
- Dallas Cowboys (1999–2002); Washington Redskins (2003); Oakland Raiders (2004)*; Arizona Cardinals (2004)
- * Offseason or practice squad member only

Awards and highlights
- All-SIAC (1998)

Career NFL statistics
- Games played: 89
- Tackles: 117
- Sacks: 9
- Stats at Pro Football Reference

Hunndens Guiseppi "Peppi" Zellner (born March 14, 1975) is an American former professional football player who was a defensive end in the National Football League (NFL) for the Dallas Cowboys, Washington Redskins and Arizona Cardinals. He played college football for the Fort Valley State Wildcats.

== Early life ==
Zellner attended Mary Persons High School, where he lettered in football and basketball. In football, he was an All-Area selection and an All-District selection, and Prep Football Report named him as an All-Dixie selection. After his senior season, he participated in the Florida-Georgia All-Star Game. In basketball, he was an All-Area selection and played in the North-South All-Star tournament.

Although he received a scholarship from the University of Georgia, academic problems forced him to join Georgia Military College. He began as a strong-side linebacker and was moved to the defensive line as a sophomore. He registered 129 tackles (33 for loss) and 15 sacks in his two junior college seasons.

In 1996, he transferred to Fort Valley State University, but eligibility problems limited his playing time to only 3 football games, collecting 18 tackles (4 for loss).

In 1997, he focused on basketball, starting at forward (17 out of 26 games), averaging 10.1 points, 9.3 rebounds and 1.4 blocked shots, while helping the school win its first conference championship since 1969.

In 1998, he returned to play football at defensive end, posting 60 tackles, 14 tackles for loss (led the team) and 3 sacks. He received All-American and All-Southern Intercollegiate Athletic Conference honors.

== Professional career ==
=== Dallas Cowboys ===
Zellner was selected by the Dallas Cowboys in the fourth round (132nd overall) of the 1999 NFL draft, after impressing in the scouting combine, recording the second fastest 40-yard dash time, first in the broad jump and first in the 20-yard dash among defensive linemen. As a rookie, he had 10 special teams tackles (tied for sixth on the team). Against the Atlanta Falcons, he posted his first career sack, while adding a quarterback pressure and 2 tackles.

In 2000, he played in 12 games, registering 13 special teams tackles (second on the team), 16 defensive tackles, 2 sacks and 3 quarterback pressures. He missed the last 4 games, after being placed on the injured reserve list with a torn left anterior cruciate ligament he suffered during a practice.

In 2001, a season-ending back injury to Ebenezer Ekuban, allowed him to start 15 games at right defensive end, setting career-highs with 46 tackles, 3 sacks (tied for fourth on the team) and 22 quarterback pressures (second on the team). The next year, he only started 2 games and registered 29 tackles. He wasn't re-signed at the end of the season.

=== Washington Redskins ===
On May 11, 2003, he was signed as a free agent by the Washington Redskins to a one-year contract. He recorded 14 tackles and one sack as a backup during the season.

=== Oakland Raiders ===
On August 17, 2004, he signed with the Oakland Raiders as a free agent. On August 31, he was traded to the Arizona Cardinals along with Troy Hambrick, in exchange for a sixth round draft choice (#182-Cedric Houston) in the 2005 NFL draft.

=== Arizona Cardinals ===
In 2004, Zellner replaced an injured Fred Wakefield, playing in all 16 games (14 starts), while registering 35 tackles and 2 sacks. On March 10, 2005, he was re-signed. He was released on August 29, 2005.

== Personal life ==
In 2002, Zellner was charged with drug possession, however, the charges were later dropped in 2003. He is a cousin of safety Tra Battle who also played for the Dallas Cowboys.
