= Monroe County School District (Georgia) =

School district in Georgia (U.S. state)

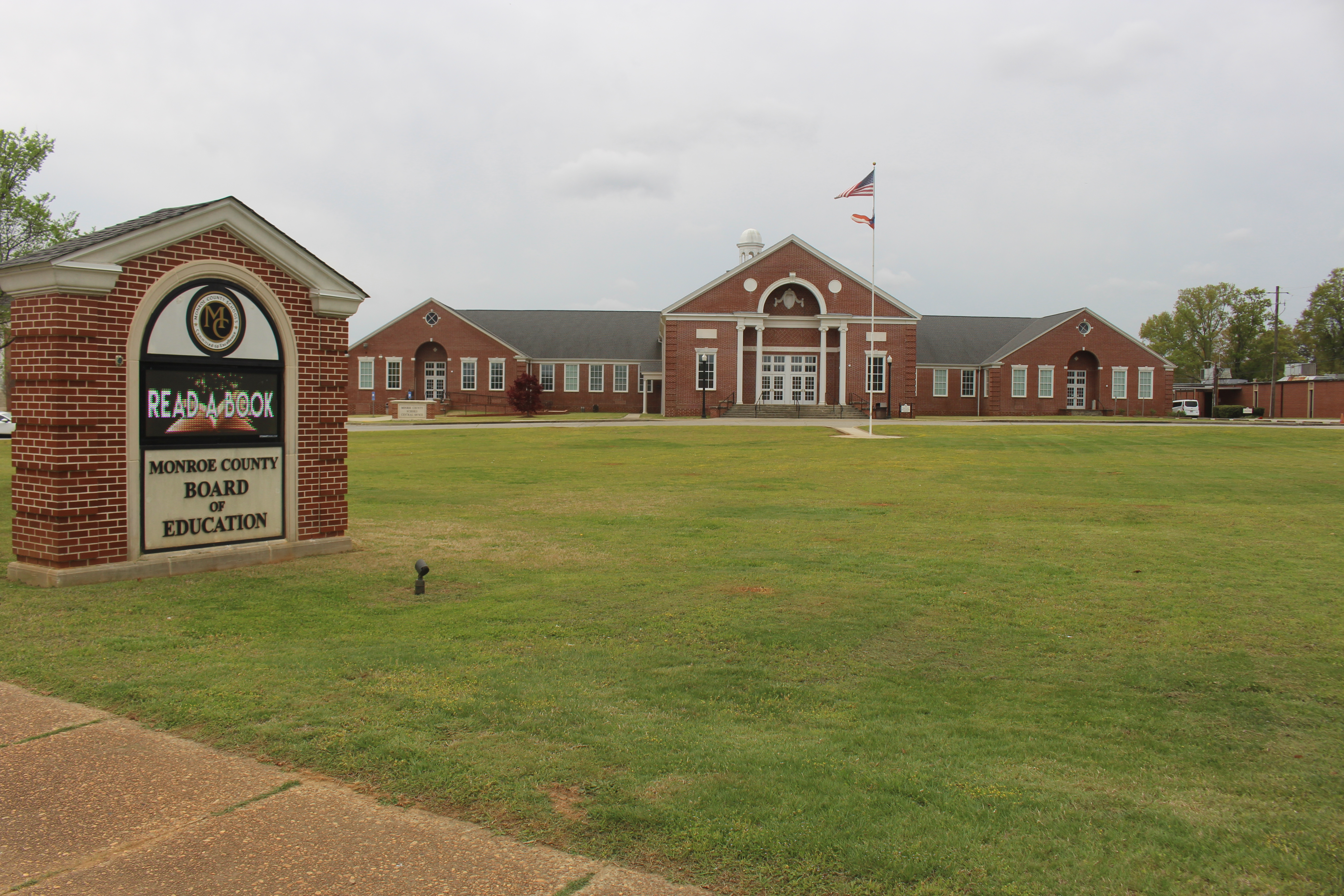
- Monroe County Board of Education building

Address
- 25 Brooklyn Avenue Forsyth, Georgia, 31029-1910; United States
- Coordinates: 33.031185°N 83.930061°W

District information
- Grades: Pre-school - 12
- Superintendent: Dr. Jim Finch
- Accreditation(s): Southern Association of Colleges and Schools; Georgia Accrediting Commission

Students and staff
- Enrollment: 3,872
- Faculty: 225

Other information
- Telephone: (478) 994-2031
- Fax: (478) 994-3364
- Website: www.monroe.k12.ga.us

The Monroe County School District is a public school district in Monroe County, Georgia, based in Forsyth. It serves the communities of Bolingbroke, Culloden, Forsyth, Juliette, and Smarr.

All portions of the county are in the district.

== Schools ==
The Monroe County School District has three elementary schools, one middle school, and one high school.

=== Elementary schools ===
- Samuel E. Hubbard Elementary School
- T.G. Scott Elementary School
- Katherine B. Sutton Elementary School

All three elementary schools are in unincorporated areas.

=== Middle schools ===
- Monroe County Middle School

=== High school ===
- Mary Persons High School
