= Rum Creek =

Rum Creek may refer to:

- Rum Creek (Ocmulgee River tributary), a stream in Georgia
- Rum Creek (West Virginia), a stream in West Virginia
