= Rachel Hanfling =

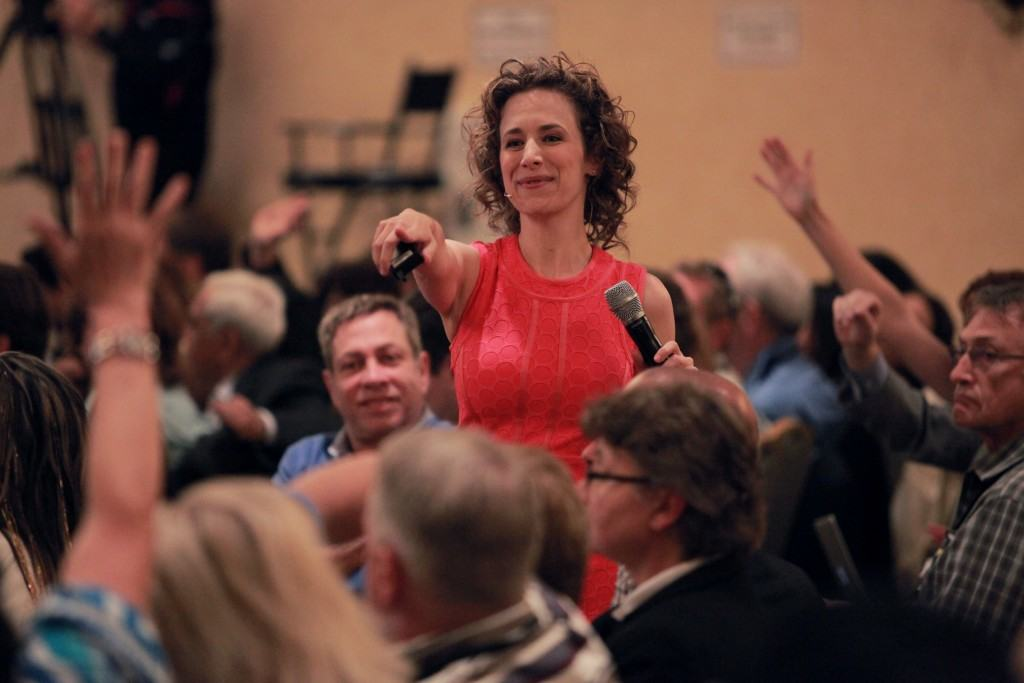
Rachel Hanfling delivering a speech in 2016.

Rachel Hanfling is a television producer, speaker and Media and Communications Trainer.

== Consulting career ==
A private training consultant for Today Show, Shark Tank, CNN and media outlets. She also teaches at Harvard.

Rachel Hanfling trains clients on various media and communication skills - media, public speaking, job interviewing, negotiating, winning customers, treating patients, and online communication.

Hanfling has spoken at the Harvard Kennedy School, MarieTV, World’s Greatest Speaker Training, Experts Academy, Women In Negotiation Summit and The World Academy For The Future of Women’s International Symposium.

== TV career ==
In 2013, Hanfling co-created and co-executive produced a special called 7 Little Johnstons on Oprah Winfrey’s network, OWN.

Hanfling was a producer for Anderson Cooper’s daytime show, Anderson.

== Awards ==
Hanfling was nominated for a Daytime Emmy for her producing work on Anderson. She was also nominated for an Alma Award from the National Council of La Raza for her producing work on A&E’s American Justice.

== Early and personal life and education ==
Rachel Hanfling was born in Chicago, Illinois and grew up in Highland Park, Illinois. She lives in New York City.
