= Mario Harvey =

American football player (born 1987)

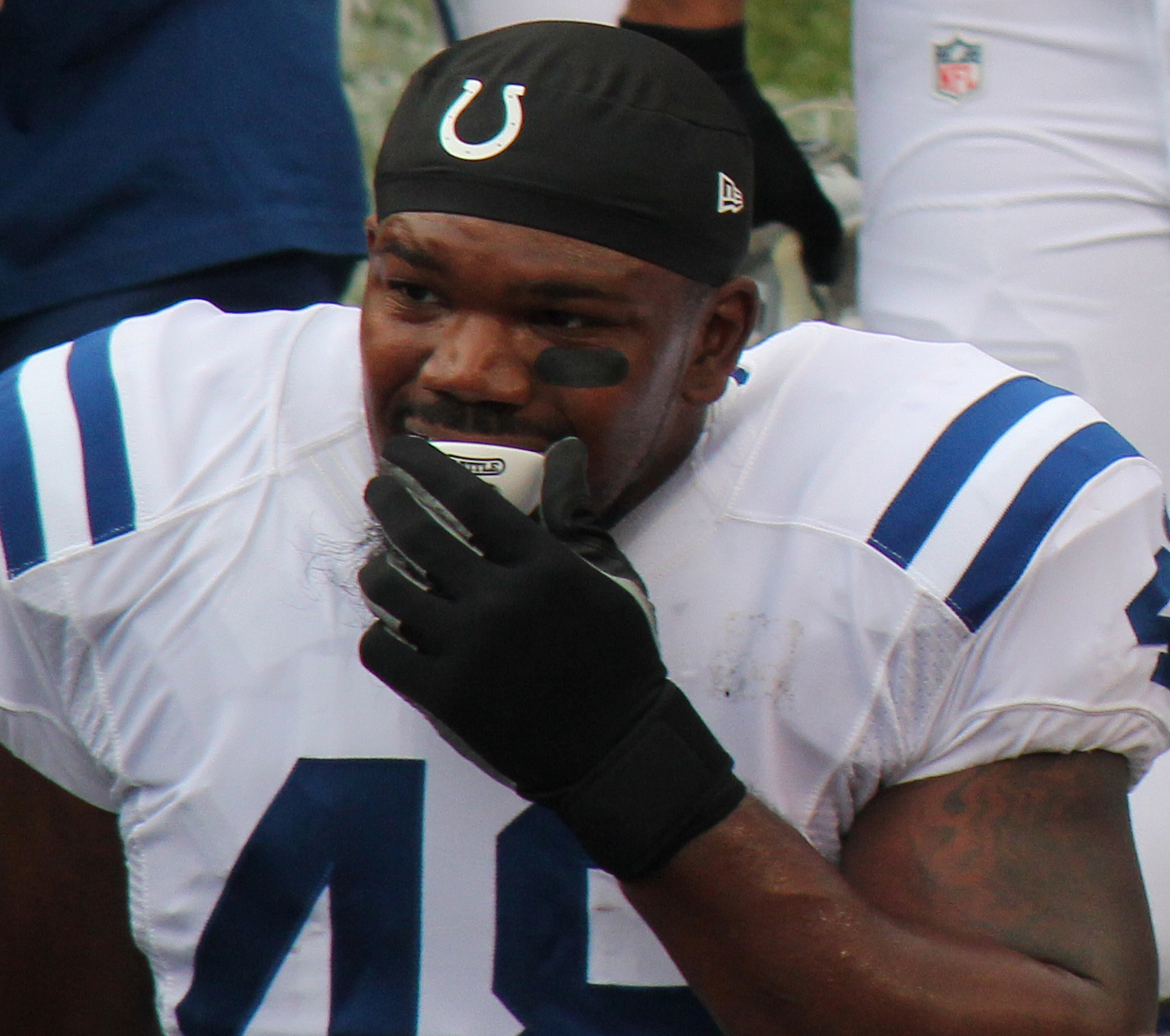
- Harvey with the Indianapolis Colts

No. 48, 54
- Position: Linebacker

Personal information
- Born: August 10, 1987 (age 39); Forsyth, Georgia, U.S.
- Listed height: 6 ft 0 in (1.83 m)
- Listed weight: 264 lb (120 kg)

Career information
- High school: Persons (Forsyth)
- College: Marshall
- NFL draft: 2011: undrafted

Career history
- Pittsburgh Steelers (2011)*; Indianapolis Colts (2012–2014); New York Jets (2014–2015)*
- * Offseason or practice squad member only

Awards and highlights
- 2× First-team All–Conference USA (2009, 2010)

Career NFL statistics
- Total tackles: 27
- Stats at Pro Football Reference

Mario Nigel Harvey (born August 10, 1987) is an American former professional football player who was a linebacker in the National Football League (NFL). He was signed by the Pittsburgh Steelers as an undrafted free agent in 2011. He also played for the Indianapolis Colts and New York Jets, and played college football for the Marshall Thundering Herd.

== Professional career ==
=== New York Jets ===
Harvey was signed to the New York Jets' practice squad on December 16, 2014. He signed a reserve/future contract with the team on December 30, 2014. Harvey was released on May 8, 2015.
