= Tra Battle =

American football player (born 1985)

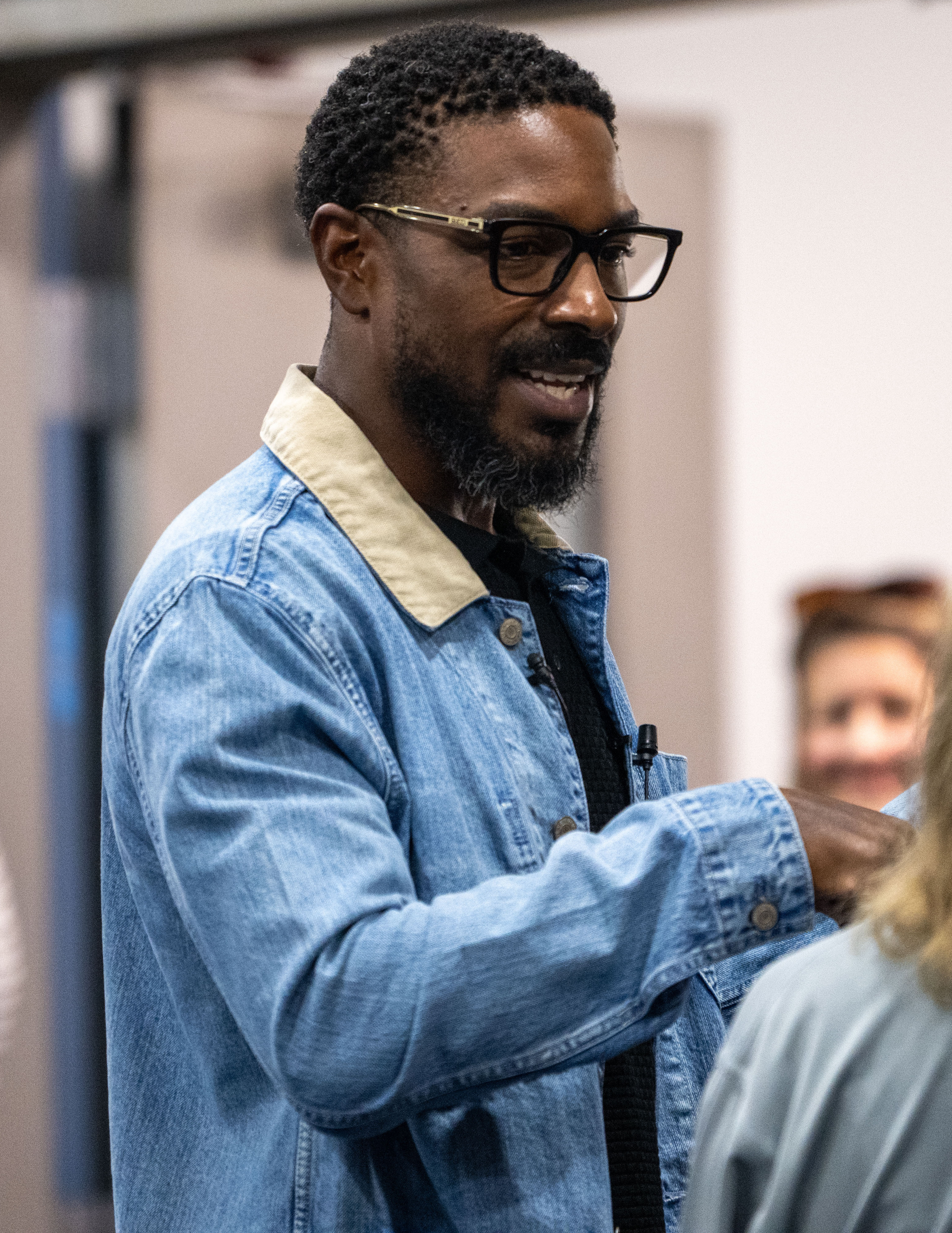
- Battle at Moody Air Force Base in 2024

No. 35, 36, 27
- Position: Safety

Personal information
- Born: January 5, 1985 (age 41); Forsyth, Georgia, U.S.
- Listed height: 5 ft 10 in (1.78 m)
- Listed weight: 177 lb (80 kg)

Career information
- High school: Mary Persons (GA)
- College: Georgia
- NFL draft: 2007: undrafted

Career history
- San Diego Chargers (2007–2008); Dallas Cowboys (2008); Detroit Lions (2009)*; Hartford Colonials (2009); Cleveland Browns (2009)*; New York Sentinels (2009); Hartford Colonials (2010); Virginia Destroyers (2011)
- * Offseason or practice squad member only

Awards and highlights
- UFL champion (2011); Third-team All-American (2006); First-team All-SEC (2006)

Career NFL statistics
- Total tackles: 15
- Stats at Pro Football Reference

Trakeius Battle (born January 5, 1985) is an American former professional football player who was a safety in the National Football League (NFL) for the San Diego Chargers and Dallas Cowboys. He played college football for the Georgia Bulldogs.

== Early life ==
Battle attended Mary Persons High School in Forsyth, Georgia, where he was a three-sport athlete, lettering in football, basketball, and track. He started since his freshman season on the football team, as a quarterback and safety. He led his team to the state championships playoffs in four straight seasons.

As a junior, he was named the team's defensive MVP. As a senior, he was named the team MVP and was named an All-Middle Georgia honoree by The Telegraph. In track, he competed in the state championships in the 110 metres hurdles, 300 metres hurdles, 4 × 100 metres relay and 4 × 400 metres relay.

== College career ==
Arriving at the University of Georgia in 2003, Battle was considered undersized at 165 pounds. He walked-on to the football team and played a role as a reserve defensive back.

In his sophomore season, he started one game against the University of Kentucky when safety Thomas Davis was injured. His best game of the season came against LSU, where Battle recorded four solo tackles, garnered his first career sack, broke up a forward pass and forced a fumble. At the end of the year, he was a recipient of the Iron Man Award for players who do not miss a practice or summer workout during the year. He was awarded the Joe B. Maxwell Family Football Scholarship.

In his junior season of 2005, he became a regular starter in the defensive backfield. In the season opener against Boise State he recorded his first career interception and led the Bulldogs with eight tackles. He finished the season as the team's third leading tackler with 71 total tackles. As a senior, he posted 58 tackles.

His senior season featured a signature game in the Deep South's Oldest Rivalry versus Auburn. Ranked #5, Auburn had hopes of playing for a National Championship after knocking of eventual champion Florida, but Georgia would have none of it due in large part to Battle. His performance tied a Georgia record that day with three interceptions, one of which he returned 30 yards for a touchdown. Battle's pick-six gave the Bulldogs a 17–0 lead, and they would eventually stretch it to 24-0 before Auburn got on the board to make it 24–7. UGA would go on to rout the Tigers 37–15, dashing their title hopes and costing Tommy Tuberville and company a shot at playing for the league crown in Atlanta. Battle would also turn in four total tackles and a pass breakup in the win. His stellar play garnered a Pontiac Game Changing Performance nomination. Also in 2006 he had 154 return yards to place him fourth on the Georgia all-time season return list.

== Professional career ==
=== San Diego Chargers ===
Battle was signed as an undrafted free agent by the San Diego Chargers after the 2007 NFL draft on August 30, when he dropped because he was considered an undersized player. He was waived on September 1 and signed to the practice squad the next day. He appeared in one game and had one tackle. On August 30, 2008, he was cut and signed to the practice squad the next day.

=== Dallas Cowboys ===
On November 26, 2008, he was signed by the Dallas Cowboys from the San Diego Chargers practice squad to play on special teams, after Pat Watkins was lost for the year with a neck injury. He appeared in 5 games, making 6 defensive tackles and 5 special teams tackles. In 2009, he was tried at cornerback and was released on May 26.

=== Detroit Lions ===
On May 27, 2009, Battle was claimed off waivers by the Detroit Lions. He was released on July 28.

=== Cleveland Browns ===
On August 24, 2009, he was signed by the Cleveland Browns. He was released on September 5.

=== New York Sentinels (UFL) ===
In 2009, he played with the New York Sentinels of the United Football League.

=== Hartford Colonials (UFL) ===
In 2010, he played with the Hartford Colonials of the United Football League.

=== Virginia Destroyers (UFL) ===
In 2011, he played with the Virginia Destroyers of the United Football League.

== Personal life ==
Battle is a cousin of former defensive end Peppi Zellner who also played for the Dallas Cowboys.

After football, Battle returned to the University of Georgia to complete his degree. While there, a classmate encouraged him to join the United States Air Force Reserve. He enlisted on December 9, 2024.
