= Alvin Toles =

American football player (born 1963)

No. 54
- Position: Linebacker

Personal information
- Born: March 23, 1963 (age 63); Barnesville, Georgia, U.S.
- Listed height: 6 ft 1 in (1.85 m)
- Listed weight: 211 lb (96 kg)

Career information
- High school: Mary Persons (Forsyth, Georgia)
- College: Tennessee
- NFL draft: 1985: 1st round, 24th overall pick

Career history
- New Orleans Saints (1985–1989)

Awards and highlights
- Second-team All-SEC (1983)

Career NFL statistics
- Fumble recoveries: 1
- Stats at Pro Football Reference

Alvin Toles (born March 23, 1963) is an American former professional football player who was a linebacker for the New Orleans Saints in the National Football League (NFL) from 1985 until 1988, when a knee injury ended his career. He played college football at the University of Tennessee, initially as a fullback before switching to linebacker his junior year. He was the Saints' 1st-round pick in the 1985 NFL draft.

== Early life ==
Toles played high school football at Mary Persons High School in Forsyth, Georgia, under long-time coach Dan Pitt. Playing as a fullback, he rushed for 1,663 yards during his senior season in 1980, leading the Bulldogs to the Class AA state championship and a 15–0 season. He rushed for 149 yards and 2 touchdowns in the Bulldogs' 34–6 victory over Duluth in the title game. He earned All-State honors, and was named the "All-Middle Georgia Player of the Year" by the Macon Telegraph. He was ranked among the top 33 recruits in the state of Georgia by the Atlanta Constitution.

== College career ==
Toles joined the Tennessee Volunteers in 1981, part of a signing class that included Reggie McKenzie, Raleigh McKenzie, Johnnie Jones, Alan Cockrell and Carl Zander. Playing as a fullback during his freshman year, he rushed for 220 yards on 47 carries while splitting time with junior Doug Furnas. During his sophomore year in 1982, he rushed for 135 yards on 46 carries.

With 250-pound sophomore Sam Henderson poised to take over the starting slot at fullback at the start of the 1983 season, Toles switched to linebacker at the request of head coach Johnny Majors. In spite of never having played defense, Toles had a breakout season, registering a team-leading 135 tackles (72 solo), including 8 tackles-for-loss (1 less than All-American teammate Reggie White). In the Vols' season-opening loss against Pittsburgh, Toles had 19 tackles, one of which broke the collarbone of Panthers quarterback John Cummings. In Tennessee's loss to Auburn, he had 17 tackles, including 4 tackles-for-loss. He also had 18 tackles (8 solo) against Alabama, 14 tackles (8 solo) against Georgia Tech, and 20 tackles (7 solo) against Ole Miss. In Tennessee's 30–23 victory over Maryland in the 1983 Florida Citrus Bowl, Toles stuffed Terrapins running back Rick Badanjek at the 1-yard line to prevent a touchdown on the opening drive, and he had a fumble recovery and an interception — both of which led to scores — in the fourth quarter. He finished the game with 6 tackles, and he was named the game's "Outstanding Defensive Player."

Toles was expected to have a big year as a senior in 1984, but broke his ankle during the game against Auburn and missed the rest of the season. In just four games, he had 43 tackles (26 solo), broke up a pass and recovered a fumble. He finished his career at Tennessee with 178 tackles (98 solo), 8 of which were for a loss, to go along with the 355 yards rushing on 93 carries he had amassed while playing fullback.

== Professional career ==
Toles was selected by the New Orleans Saints in the first round (24th overall pick) in the 1985 NFL draft, one of three Vol linebackers (the others being Carl Zander and Reggie McKenzie) to be drafted that year. He played 55 games over four seasons for the Saints, much of it on special teams as he competed with Sam Mills and Vaughan Johnson for playing time at linebacker. In the Saints' 24–22 loss to San Francisco on October 25, 1987, Toles returned a blocked punt for a touchdown, temporarily giving the Saints the lead. During the Saints' 14–10 victory over the Los Angeles Rams on November 13, 1988, he suffered a serious knee injury. He was waived by the Saints in 1990.

== Personal life ==
Toles' son, Andrew Toles, was a professional baseball player. His daughter, Morgan Toles, is a former Seminole basketball standout.
