= 1940 All-SEC football team =

American college football all-star team

The 1940 All-SEC football team consists of American football players selected to the All-Southeastern Conference (SEC) chosen by various selectors for the 1940 college football season. Tennessee won the conference.

== All-SEC selections ==
=== Ends ===
- Buddy Elrod, Miss. St. (AP-1, INS, UP)
- Holt Rast, Alabama (AP-1, INS, UP)
- Ed Cifers, Tennessee (AP-2)
- Bob Ison, Georgia Tech (AP-2)
- Fergie Ferguson, Florida (AP-3)
- Harold Newman, Alabama (AP-3)

=== Tackles ===
- Abe Shires, Tennessee (AP-1, INS, UP)
- Charles Dufour, Tulane (AP-2, INS)
- John Tripson, Miss. St. (AP-2, UP)
- Fred Davis, Alabama (AP-1)
- John Eibner, Kentucky (AP-3)
- John Barrett, LSU (AP-3)

=== Guards ===
- Bob Suffridge, Tennessee (College Football Hall of Fame) (AP-1, INS, UP)
- John W. Goree, LSU (AP-3, INS, UP)
- Hunter Corhern, Miss. St. (AP-1)
- Ed Molinski, Tennessee (College Football Hall of Fame) (AP-2)
- Edward Hickerson, Alabama (AP-2)
- Julius Battista, Florida (AP-3)

=== Centers ===
- Bob Gude, Vanderbilt (AP-1, INS, UP)
- Norbert Ackermann, Tennessee (AP-2)

=== Backfield ===
- Bob Foxx, Tennessee (AP-1, INS, UP)
- Harvey Johnson, Miss. St. (AP-2, INS, UP)
- John Hovious, Ole Miss (AP-1, INS)
- Jimmy Nelson, Alabama (AP-1, INS)
- James Thibaut, Tulane (AP-2, UP)
- Neal McGowen, Auburn (AP-1)
- Frank Sinkwich, Georgia (College Football Hall of Fame) (UP)
- John Butler, Tennessee (AP-2)
- Merle Hapes, Ole Miss (AP-2)
- Charles Ishmael, Kentucky (AP-3)
- John Bosch, Georgia Tech (AP-3)
- Rufus Deal, Auburn (AP-3)
- William Jefferson, Miss St. (AP-3)

== Key ==
AP = compiled by the Associated Press, chosen by the conference coaches.

INS = International News Service.

UP = United Press
Bold = Consensus first-team selection

== See also ==
- 1940 College Football All-America Team
