= Carl Zander =

American football player (born 1963)

No. 91
- Position: Linebacker

Personal information
- Born: April 12, 1963 (age 63); Mendham Borough, New Jersey, U.S.
- Listed height: 6 ft 2 in (1.88 m)
- Listed weight: 235 lb (107 kg)

Career information
- High school: West Morris Mendham (Mendham Borough)
- College: Tennessee
- NFL draft: 1985: 2nd round, 43rd overall pick

Career history
- Cincinnati Bengals (1985–1991); Indianapolis Colts (1992)*
- * Offseason or practice squad member only

Awards and highlights
- First-team All-SEC (1984)

Career NFL statistics
- Sacks: 8
- Fumble recoveries: 7
- Interceptions: 3
- Stats at Pro Football Reference

Carl August Zander Jr (born April 12, 1963) is an American former professional football player who was a linebacker for the Cincinnati Bengals of the National Football League (NFL) from 1985 to 1991. Selected in the second round of the 1985 NFL draft, he was a member of the Bengals' starting lineup in Super Bowl XXIII. He played college football for the Tennessee Volunteers, where he was a captain of the Vols' 1984 squad.

== Early life ==
Zander played high school football at West Morris Mendham High School under long-time coach Richard Attonito. During his senior year in 1980, he played fullback, linebacker and punter. He rushed for 1,178 yards and 26 touchdowns on offense, registered 167 tackles (110 solo) on defense, and averaged 41 yards per punt, with a long of 83 yards, on special teams. He received All-State honors at the end of the season.

== College career ==
Zander joined the Tennessee Volunteers in 1981, part of a signing class that included Alvin Toles, Reggie McKenzie, Raleigh McKenzie, Johnnie Jones, and Alan Cockrell. During his freshman year in 1981, he played only sparingly as a reserve behind veteran Mike Cofer, and registered 11 tackles (6 solo). His first start came in the finale against Vanderbilt, in which he had 9 tackles (1 for a loss) and a batted-down pass. He also started in Tennessee's 28–21 victory over Wisconsin in the 1981 Garden State Bowl, and registered a team-leading 14 tackles. Though bothered by injuries during his sophomore season in 1982, he nevertheless picked up 35 tackles (20 solo) and recovered a fumble.

Zander's breakout season came during his junior year in 1983, when he registered 129 tackles (67 solo), second on the team only to Alvin Toles' 135. He had 20 tackles (7 solo) in the Vols' opening loss to Pittsburgh, 13 tackles (8 solo) in Tennessee's 41–34 win over Alabama, and 19 tackles in the Vols' 13–10 loss to Ole Miss. In Tennessee's 7–0 win over Rutgers, which took place at Giants Stadium in Zander's home state of New Jersey, he had 16 tackles (7 solo), and shared "Player of the Game" accolades with Reggie White.

As part of a linebacker corps that included Toles, Reggie McKenzie, and Dale Jones, Zander registered a team-leading 167 tackles, including 102 solo tackles, a sack and 3 tackles-for-loss, during his senior year in 1984. He also had an interception, forced 3 fumbles, and broke up 6 passes. He had 16 tackles in Tennessee's 24–24 tie against Army, and had a season-high of 22 tackles in the Vols' 17–12 loss to Kentucky. In Tennessee's 28–27 loss to Maryland in the 1984 Sun Bowl, he had a team-leading 20 tackles, and received the game's "Most Valuable Lineman" award. He was named All-SEC by SouthSports.

During his career at Tennessee, Zander registered 342 tackles (195 solo), including a sack and 5 tackles-for-loss, as well as 5 forced fumbles, 2 fumble recoveries, and 9 batted-down passes. As of 2012, his 167 tackles in 1984 remains the team's 5th-highest single-season total, and the highest since the 1970s.

== Professional career ==
Zander was selected by the Cincinnati Bengals in the second round (43rd overall pick) of the 1985 NFL draft, one of three Tennessee linebackers (the other two being Reggie McKenzie and Alvin Toles) drafted that year. During his seven seasons with the Bengals, he played in a total of 106 games, and was a starter in 94. He recorded 8 sacks, 3 interceptions and 7 fumble recoveries (which he returned for a total of 99 yards). By the 1989 season, he was the Bengals' defensive signal-caller, relaying the play from the coaches to the other players on the field, and modifying it as necessary to respond to the offensive formation.

Zander was in the starting lineup for the Bengals' 20–16 loss to San Francisco in Super Bowl XXIII. He had three tackles in the game.

Zander contemplated retiring in March 1991 after the Bengals offered him a contract he considered insufficient, and missed the first two games of the season, but played during the remaining 14 games.
