= Bob Gude =

American football player (1918–1998)

No. 73, 50, 52
- Positions: Center, guard

Personal information
- Born: February 25, 1918; Memphis, Tennessee, U.S.
- Died: October 6, 1998 (aged 80); Little Rock, Arkansas, U.S.
- Listed height: 6 ft 1 in (1.85 m)
- Listed weight: 200 lb (91 kg)

Career information
- High school: South Side (Memphis)
- College: Vanderbilt (1937–1941)
- NFL draft: 1942: 14th round, 130th overall pick

Career history
- Chicago Bears (1942); Philadelphia Eagles (1946); Bethlehem Bulldogs (1946–1947)

Awards and highlights
- All-American (1941); 2× First-team All-SEC (1940, 1941)

Career NFL statistics
- Games played: 2
- Stats at Pro Football Reference

Henry Paul "Bob" Gude Jr. (February 25, 1918 – October 6, 1998) was an American professional football player. He was a prominent center for the Vanderbilt Commodores of Vanderbilt University. Gude was frequently compared to former Commodore greats Carl Hinkle and Pete Gracey. "He was Vanderbilt's main defensive cog." Gude was twice All-SEC. Gude was named to the Fox-Movietone All-American team in 1941. He was drafted in the 14th round of the 1942 NFL draft by the Chicago Bears. While serving in World War II, Gude was a sergeant who played army football under Wallace Wade.

== See also ==
- 1941 College Football All-America Team
