= Dee Williams (American football) =

American football player (born 1999)

Profile
- Positions: Cornerback, return specialist

Personal information
- Born: December 6, 1999 (age 26); Forsyth, Georgia, U.S.
- Listed height: 5 ft 10 in (1.78 m)
- Listed weight: 190 lb (86 kg)

Career information
- High school: Mary Persons (Forsyth, Georgia)
- College: East Central CC (2019–2021); Tennessee (2022–2023)
- NFL draft: 2024: undrafted

Career history
- Seattle Seahawks (2024); New York Giants (2024–2025); Cleveland Browns (2025)*
- * Offseason or practice squad member only

Career NFL statistics as of 2024
- Return yards: 388
- Stats at Pro Football Reference

Desmond Zy'ion "Dee" Williams (born December 6, 1999) is an American professional football cornerback and return specialist. He played college football for the East Central Community College Warriors and the Tennessee Volunteers. He previously played for the Seattle Seahawks.

== Early life ==
Williams attended high school at Mary Persons. Williams decided to commit to play college football at East Central Community College.

== College career ==
=== East Central CC ===
During Williams three year career at East Central CC, he totaled 103 tackles and 13 interceptions.

=== Tennessee ===
Coming out of JUCO, Williams decided to commit to play Division I football for the Tennessee Volunteers. During the 2022 season, Williams notched five tackles, a forced fumble, while also returning 15 punts for 281 yards and a touchdown. In week seven of the 2023 season, Williams returned a punt for a touchdown to help the Volunteers beat Texas A&M 20-13. Mid way through the 2023 season, Williams made the shift from playing defensive back to wide receiver for Tennessee. In his first game at receiver, Williams hauled in one reception for 11 yards in a win over UConn Huskies. During the 2023 season, Williams made two catches for ten yards, two tackles, and returned 20 punts for 259 yards and a touchdown.

== Professional career ==
Pre-draft measurables
Height	Weight	Arm length	Hand span	Wingspan	40-yard dash	10-yard split	20-yard split	20-yard shuttle	Three-cone drill	Vertical jump	Broad jump
5 ft 10 1/2 in (1.79 m)	190 lb (86 kg)	30 3/4 in (0.78 m)	9 1/8 in (0.23 m)	6 ft 1 3/4 in (1.87 m)	4.56 s	1.65 s	2.65 s	4.37 s	7.35 s	30.5 in (0.77 m)	9 ft 6 in (2.90 m)
All values from Pro Day

=== Seattle Seahawks ===
Williams signed with the Seattle Seahawks as an undrafted free agent on May 3, 2024.

On July 18, 2024, Williams was placed on the Active/Non-football injury or illness (NFI) list. On July 19, he was removed from the NFI list after he passed his physical. He was among the 53 players to make the Seahawks roster out of the preseason. On December 5, Williams was waived.

=== New York Giants ===
On December 6, 2024, Williams was claimed off waivers by the New York Giants.

On August 26, 2025, Williams was waived by the Giants as part of final roster cuts and re-signed to the practice squad the next day. He was released on September 17.

=== Cleveland Browns ===
On October 8, 2025, Williams signed with the Cleveland Browns' practice squad.
