= Bob Ison =

American football player and U. S. Navy veteran

Georgia Tech Yellow Jackets
- Position: End

Career information
- College: Georgia Tech (1939–1940)

Awards and highlights
- 2× Third-team All-American (1939, 1940); First-team All-SEC (1939); Second-team All-SEC (1940)

Robert Lindsey Ison (February 25, 1919 – September 26, 1989) was a college football player and U. S. Navy veteran. He played as an end for Bill Alexander at Georgia Tech, selected third-team All-American in 1939. He was selected for the all-time Alexander era Tech team.
