= Malik Herring =

American football player (born 1997)

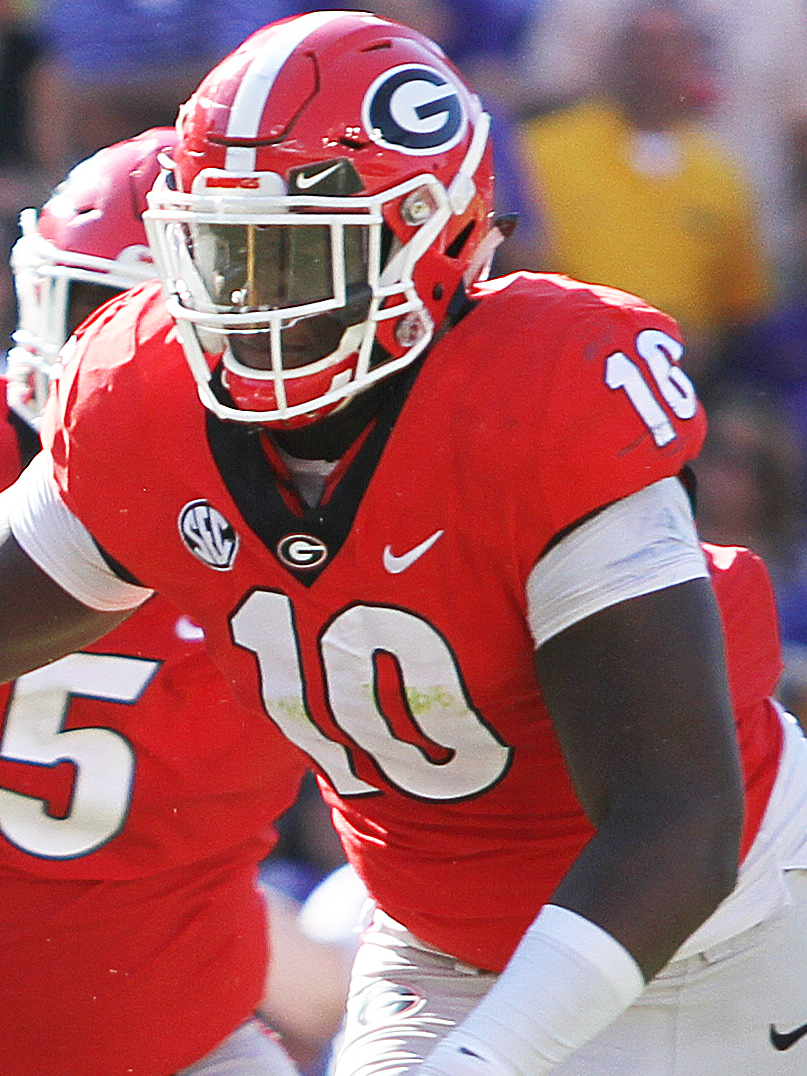
- Herring with the Georgia Bulldogs in 2018

No. 90 – Miami Dolphins
- Position: Defensive end
- Roster status: Active

Personal information
- Born: November 9, 1997 (age 29); Forsyth, Georgia, U.S.
- Listed height: 6 ft 3 in (1.91 m)
- Listed weight: 275 lb (125 kg)

Career information
- High school: Mary Persons (Forsyth)
- College: Georgia (2017–2020)
- NFL draft: 2021: undrafted

Career history
- Kansas City Chiefs (2021–2025); Tennessee Titans (2026)*; Miami Dolphins (2026–present)
- * Offseason or practice squad member only

Awards and highlights
- 2× Super Bowl champion (LVII, LVIII)

Career NFL statistics as of Week 10, 2026
- Total tackles: 38
- Sacks: 2.5
- Forced fumbles: 1
- Fumble recoveries: 1
- Pass deflections: 2
- Stats at Pro Football Reference

Al'Malik Demichia Herring (born November 9, 1997) is an American professional football defensive end for the Miami Dolphins of the National Football League (NFL). He played college football for the Georgia Bulldogs and was signed by the Kansas City Chiefs as an undrafted free agent in 2021.

== Early life and education ==
Malik Herring was born on November 9, 1997, in Forsyth, Georgia. He attended Mary Persons High School there, becoming a four-star recruit following graduation. He was recruited to over twenty schools, choosing Georgia. As a freshman in 2017, Herring played in all 15 games, recording seven total stops. He appeared in 14 games the following year, compiling 24 stops and two assisted sacks. He appeared in 12 of 14 games as a junior, starting nine. He was given Georgia's "Defensive Most Improved Player Award" following the season. He was starting defensive end for eight of the team's ten games as a senior. He finished the year with 20 tackles.

== Professional career ==
Pre-draft measurables
Height	Weight	Arm length	Hand span	Wingspan
6 ft 3 1/4 in (1.91 m)	275 lb (125 kg)	33 3/8 in (0.85 m)	10 1/2 in (0.27 m)	6 ft 9 1/8 in (2.06 m)
All values from Pro Day

=== Kansas City Chiefs ===
After going unselected in the 2021 NFL draft, Herring was signed as an undrafted free agent by the Kansas City Chiefs. He was placed on the reserve/non-football injury list to start the season, as he was recovering from a torn ACL suffered in practices for the college football Senior Bowl.

Herring made the Chiefs' final roster in 2022, as the team's sixth defensive end. He made his NFL debut in week three, making two tackles in the 20–17 loss to the Indianapolis Colts. Herring won Super Bowl LVII when the Chiefs defeated the Philadelphia Eagles 38–35.

Herring ended 2023 with 10 tackles, 1.5 sacks, 1 fumble recovery and 1 pass defensed. The Chiefs reached Super Bowl LVIII where they defeated the San Francisco 49ers 25-22. Herring recorded one tackle in the win.

On March 11, 2024, Herring re-signed with the Chiefs.

On October 29, 2025, Herring was released by the Chiefs. On November 4, Herring was re-signed with the practice squad.

=== Tennessee Titans ===
On March 13, 2026, Herring signed with the Tennessee Titans. On August 30, he was waived by the Titans as a part of final roster cuts before the start of the regular season.

=== Miami Dolphins ===
On August 31, 2026, Herring signed with the Miami Dolphins.
