= 1939 College Football All Polish-American Team =

The 1939 College Football All Polish-American Team was the first all-star College Football Team of Polish-Americans. The team was selected by five American sports scribes from leading American newspapers. All members were of Polish descent.

== First team ==
Name	Position	School
Walt Nowak	Left End	Villanova
Ted Konetsky	Left Tackle	Pittsburgh
Ed Molinski	Left Guard	Tennessee
Rudy Mucha	Center	Washington
Frank Bykowski	Right Guard	Purdue
Walt Walewski	Right Tackle	Holy Cross
Ed Rucinski	Right End	Indiana
Steve Sitko	Quarterback	Notre Dame
Bill Krywicki	Left Halfback	Fordham
Forest Evashevski	Right Halfback	Michigan
John Polanski	Full Back	Wake Forest
