= Mary Persons High School =

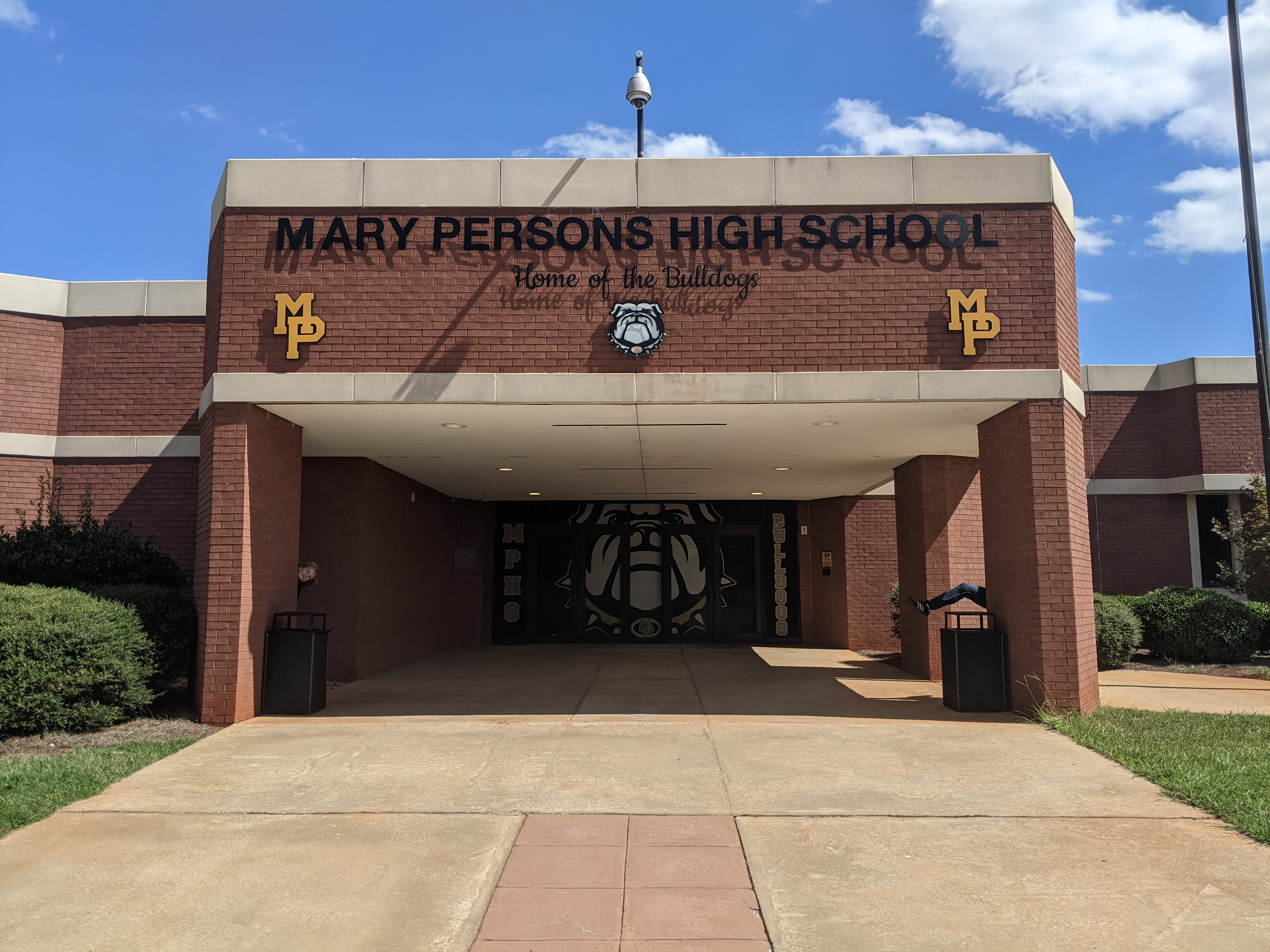

Location
- 300 Montpelier Ave. Forsyth, Georgia 31029; United States
- Coordinates: 33.0273°N 83.9327°W

Information
- School type: Public high school
- School district: Monroe County Schools
- NCES District ID: 1303720
- Teaching staff: 80.30 (FTE)
- Grades: 9-12
- Enrollment: 1,286 (2023–2024)
- Student to teacher ratio: 16.01
- Campus type: Rural; fringe
- Colors: Black and gold
- Team name: Bulldogs
- Website: https://mphs.monroe.k12.ga.us/

Mary Persons High School is a public 9-12 high school located in Forsyth, Georgia, United States. It is the sole high school of Monroe County Schools. During the 2011–12 school year, 1,181 students were enrolled in the school. There are around 69 faculty members, giving the school a 17.07 student/teacher ratio.

The 2020-2021 Competition Cheerleading team won the AAA State Championship at the Macon Coliseum on February 16, 2021. The team is coached by Kyle Ward. Anthony Mannella became the first wrestler at Mary Persons High School to win two back-to-back state championships, winning in the 3A weight class of 160 in 2022 and winning the 3A weight class of 157 in 2023.

== Alumni ==
- Tra Battle, former NFL player
- Harold Clarke, former Chief Justice of the Georgia Supreme Court
- Mario Harvey, former NFL player
- Malik Herring, NFL player for the Kansas City Chiefs
- Alvin Toles, former NFL player
- Dee Williams, NFL player for the Seattle Seahawks
- Peppi Zellner, former NFL player
