= Ed Molinski =

American football player (1917–1986)

No. 36 – Tennessee Volunteers
- Position: Guard
- Class: of 1941

Personal information
- Born: August 20, 1917; Massillon, Ohio, U.S.
- Died: June 26, 1986 (aged 68); Memphis, Tennessee, U.S.

Career information
- High school: Massillon Washington (Massillon, Ohio)
- College: Tennessee (1937–1940)

Awards and highlights
- Consensus All-American (1939); First-team All-American (1940); First-team All-SEC (1939); 2× Second-team All-SEC (1938, 1940)
- College Football Hall of Fame (Class of 1990)

Ed Molinski (August 20, 1917 – June 26, 1986) was a Hall of Fame college football player for the University of Tennessee. He later became a doctor after being involved in boxing, World War II, and college coaching.

== Football career ==
Molinski played his high school ball at Massillon Washington High School in Massillon, Ohio, where he played for legendary coach Paul Brown from 1934 to 1936 and was on the 1935 National Championship team. After graduating, he moved on to Tennessee where he played for another legendary coach, Robert Neyland. Molinski was a standout at guard in both high school and college.

While at Tennessee, he helped lead the teams there to a 31–2 record and three undefeated regular seasons. He was a member of the 1938 Tennessee team that won the National Championship, and the 1939 team that put together an unscored upon regular season. That year, Molinski was named to several All-American teams. He was also named All-American the following season in 1940. In 1939, he was named to the 1939 College Football All Polish-American Team.

Molinski was an All-American at the guard position, but was noted as a great player on both sides of the ball. He played on the defensive line for his entire career at Tennessee. Molinski was known as a fiery player during his time at Tennessee, a benefit for the offensive and defensive line positions. His temperament was apparent when he was ejected early in the 1939 Orange Bowl, the final game for the 1938 championship team.

Molinski was elected to the College Football Hall of Fame in 1990, Tennessee Sports Hall of Fame in 1994.

== Other ==
Molinski was also involved in Golden Gloves boxing. He was the state heavyweight champion in Ohio, while also captaining the university boxing squad. He was a National Golden Glove Semi-Finalist during his amateur career. After college, Molinski served in the United States Marine Corps during World War II, reaching the rank of second lieutenant.

Following the war, Molinski worked as an assistant football coach and a history professor at the Memphis State and Mississippi State in addition to studying for a medical degree. The then Dr. Molinski finally settled in Memphis, Tennessee and practiced medicine until his death. Molinski earned the M.D. degree from the UT Center for the Health Sciences. He also spent 35 years serving as a physician/general practitioner who served underprivileged communities in Memphis, Tennessee. In addition, he was the Memphis State football team doctor and professional fight doctor for the city.
