= Fred Davis (defensive lineman) =

American football player (1918–1995)

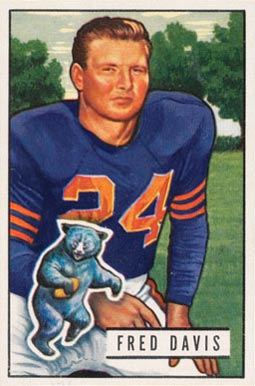
- Davis on a 1951 Bowman football card

No. 17, 24
- Positions: Defensive lineman, offensive tackle

Personal information
- Born: February 15, 1918; Louisville, Kentucky, U.S.
- Died: March 10, 1995 (aged 77); Selma, Alabama, U.S.
- Listed height: 6 ft 3 in (1.91 m)
- Listed weight: 244 lb (111 kg)

Career information
- High school: duPont Manual (Louisville)
- College: Alabama
- NFL draft: 1941: 3rd round, 25th overall pick

Career history
- Washington Redskins (1941–1945); Chicago Bears (1946–1951)

Awards and highlights
- 2× NFL champion (1942, 1946); Second-team All-Pro (1948); 2× Pro Bowl (1942, 1950); First-team All-SEC (1940); Second-team All-SEC (1939)

Career NFL statistics
- Games played: 97
- Games started: 34
- Fumble recoveries: 4
- Stats at Pro Football Reference

Frederick Lee Davis (February 15, 1918 – March 10, 1995) was an American professional football player who was a defensive lineman and offensive tackle in the National Football League (NFL) for the Washington Redskins and Chicago Bears. A native of Louisville, Kentucky, Davis played college football for the Alabama Crimson Tide and was selected in the third round of the 1941 NFL draft with the 25th overall pick.
