= 1939 All-SEC football team =

American college football all-star team

The 1939 All-SEC football team consists of American football players selected to the All-Southeastern Conference (SEC) chosen by various selectors for the 1939 college football season. Tennessee won the conference.

== All-SEC selections ==
=== Ends ===
- Ken Kavanaugh, LSU (College Football Hall of Fame) (AP-1, UP-1)
- Bob Ison, Georgia Tech (AP-1, UP-1)
- Ralph Wenzel, Tulane (AP-2, UP-2)
- Buddy Elrod, Miss. St. (AP-2)
- Ed Cifers, Tennessee (UP-2)
- Hal Newman, Alabama (AP-3)
- McCubbin, Kentucky (AP-3)

=== Tackles ===
- Harley McCollum, Tulane (AP-1, UP-1)
- Abe Shires, Tennessee (AP-1, UP-2)
- John Eibner, Kentucky (AP-2, UP-1)
- Clark Goff, Florida (AP-3, UP-2)
- Fred Davis, Alabama (AP-2)
- Walter Merrill, Alabama (AP-3)

=== Guards ===
- Ed Molinski, Tennessee (College Football Hall of Fame) (AP-1, UP-2)
- Bob Suffridge, Tennessee (College Football Hall of Fame) (AP-2, UP-1)
- Milton Howell, Auburn (AP-2, UP-1)
- John W. Goree, LSU (AP-1)
- Cavette, Georgia Tech (AP-3, UP-2)
- Tommy O'Boyle, Tulane (AP-3)

=== Centers ===
- Cary Cox, Alabama (UP-1)
- James Rike, Tennessee (AP-1)
- Autrey, Ole Miss (AP-3, UP-2)
- Goolsby, Miss. St. (AP-2)

=== Quarterbacks ===
- George Cafego, Tennessee (College Football Hall of Fame) (AP-1, UP-1)
- Sam Bartholomew, Tennessee (AP-2)
- Bill Schneller, Ole Miss (UP-2)
- Murphy, Georgia Tech (AP-3)

=== Halfbacks ===
- Bob "Jitterbug" Kellogg, Tulane (AP-1, UP-1)
- Doc Plunkett, Vanderbilt (AP-3, UP-1)
- Bob Foxx, Tennessee (AP-1)
- John Hovious, Ole Miss (AP-2)
- McGowen, Auburn (AP-2)
- Harvey Johnson, Miss. St. (UP-2)
- Jimmy Nelson, Alabama (UP-2)
- Nix, Miss. St. (AP-3)

=== Fullbacks ===
- Howard Ector, Georgia Tech (AP-2, UP-1)
- Bill Schneller, Ole Miss (AP-1)
- Fordham, Georgia (UP-2)
- Golden, Tulane (AP-3)

== Key ==
AP = Associated Press

UP = United Press.

Bold = Consensus first-team selection by both AP and UP

== See also ==
- 1939 College Football All-America Team
