= Buddy Elrod =

American football player (1918–1998)

Profile
- Position: End

Personal information
- Born: October 28, 1918; Texas, U.S.
- Died: June 13, 1998 (aged 79)
- Listed height: 6 ft 1 in (1.85 m)
- Listed weight: 186 lb (84 kg)

Career information
- College: Mississippi State
- NFL draft: 1941: 9th round, 73rd overall pick

Career history
- Philadelphia Eagles (1941)

Awards and highlights
- First-team All-American (1940); SEC Player of the Year (1940); First-team All-SEC (1940); Second-team All-SEC (1939)

Ervin B. "Buddy" Elrod (October 28, 1918 – June 13, 1998) was an American football player. He attended the Mississippi State University and played college football for the Mississippi State Bulldogs football team. He played at the end position for the Bulldogs and was selected by the Associated Press, Central Press Association, New York Sun and Liberty magazine as a first-team player on the 1940 College Football All-America Team. He signed with the Philadelphia Eagles in 1941 but did not play in any games. He entered the military in 1942. He was inducted into the Mississippi State Sports Hall of Fame in 1971 and the Mississippi Sports Hall of Fame in 1975.
