= Johnnie Jones =

American gridiron football player (born 1962)

No. 33, 24
- Position: Running back

Personal information
- Born: June 30, 1962 (age 64); Covington, Tennessee, U.S.
- Listed height: 5 ft 10 in (1.78 m)
- Listed weight: 205 lb (93 kg)

Career information
- High school: Munford (Munford, Tennessee)
- College: Tennessee
- NFL draft: 1985: 5th round, 137th overall pick

Career history
- Seattle Seahawks (1985)*; Hamilton Tiger-Cats (1987–1988); Albany Firebirds (1990)
- * Offseason or practice squad member only

Awards and highlights
- Second-team All-American (1984); 2× First-team All-SEC (1983, 1984); Citrus Bowl MVP (1983)

Johnnie Henry Jones (born June 30, 1962) is an American former professional football player who was a running back for the Hamilton Tiger-Cats of the Canadian Football League (CFL). Though drafted by the Seattle Seahawks in 1985, injuries prevented him from playing in the National Football League (NFL). He joined Hamilton in 1987, when he was nominated for the CFL's Most Outstanding Rookie Award. In 1990, he played for the Albany Firebirds in the Arena Football League (AFL).

Jones played college football at the University of Tennessee from 1981 to 1984, setting school records for career rushing yards, most rushing yards in a season, and most rushing yards in a game. He was named a second-team All American by the Associated Press in 1984.

== Early life ==
Jones attended Munford High School in Munford, Tennessee, where he rushed for 4,547 yards and 47 touchdowns during his high school career. During his senior year, he ran for 2,157 yards and 24 touchdowns, and was named West Tennessee Offensive Player of the Year by the Jackson Sun. He was a consensus All-State running back and All-South honorable mention. He was ranked the number eight recruit in the state by the Knoxville News Sentinel and the number two running back by the Knoxville Journal.

Jones is one of three Munford High School athletes, along with baseball pitcher Aaron Fultz and volleyball star Scarlet Gable, to have his number retired.

== College ==
Jones signed with Tennessee in a class that included Alan Cockrell, Reggie McKenzie, Raleigh McKenzie, Carl Zander and Alvin Toles. He played only sparingly during his freshman year in 1981, rushing for 25 yards on 4 carries as a backup to veteran running back James Berry. Jones rushed for 341 yards on 57 attempts for the junior varsity squad.

During his sophomore season in 1982, Jones emerged from spring practice the starter, but split playing time with juniors Chuck Coleman and Randall Morris. He finished the season with 421 yards and 4 touchdowns on 93 carries. He rushed for 63 yards and a touchdown on 9 carries in the Vols' 31–21 loss to Georgia Tech on October 23, and was named the team's "Offensive Player of the Week." His 42-yard touchdown run against Vanderbilt was the 1982 team's longest run.

=== 1983 season ===
Jones entered the 1983 season again competing with Coleman for playing time, though Morris had moved to fullback. Jones injured his ankle in the opener against Pittsburgh, and played only sparingly against New Mexico and Auburn. While cutting wood with his father on the Sunday following the Auburn game, Jones suggested he was going to quit the team, but his father convinced him to keep playing. Six days later, with his family watching from the stands, he erupted for 148 yards on 20 attempts, including a 41-yard touchdown, in Tennessee's blowout win over The Citadel.

Perhaps the most memorable play of Jones' career came in Tennessee's game against rival Alabama, which took place at Legion Field on October 15. After rallying from a 10-point deficit to tie the game at 34, Tennessee had regained possession with just over three minutes to play. On a 3rd-down play, Jones took a pitch from Alan Cockrell, dodged several defenders, and raced 66 yards to the end zone to score what would prove to be the winning touchdown. He finished the game with 112 rushing yards.

After missing the Georgia Tech game with an injury, Jones returned for a record-breaking performance on October 29 against Rutgers, rushing for 234 yards on 41 attempts. In spite of this performance, Tennessee managed just one touchdown, winning 7–0. Jones' 234 yards broke the school's single-game rushing record of 201 yards, set by Stanley Morgan against Hawaii in 1975, and his 41 attempts broke the school's single-game record of 35, set by Hubert Simpson against Kentucky in 1979.

Jones broke his own rushing record in Tennessee's 34–24 win over Vanderbilt on November 26 at Neyland Stadium, running for 248 yards. On the second play of the 4th quarter, after Vanderbilt had seized the momentum and had taken a 24–20 lead, Jones broke through the Commodore defense and raced 70 yards for the go-ahead touchdown. He also had a 41-yard touchdown in the 2nd quarter. He was named "Player of the Week" by the Associated Press for his efforts.

In Tennessee's wild 30–23 victory over Maryland in the 1983 Florida Citrus Bowl, Jones rushed for 154 yards on 29 carries, and scored two touchdowns in the 4th quarter. He received the game's Most Valuable Player award.

For the season, Jones amassed a school-record 1,116 yards and 5 touchdowns on 191 attempts, becoming the first Vol running back to rush for more than a thousand yards in a season (this in spite of missing two games with injuries). His total rushing yardage was second only to Bo Jackson's 1,213 in the SEC.

=== 1984 season ===
Jones entered the 1984 season a candidate for the Heisman Trophy, and made a strong case for his candidacy in the first two games of the season. He rushed for 203 yards and 3 touchdowns in Tennessee's 34–27 win over Washington State on September 1, and ran for 197 yards on 26 carries in the Vols' 27–21 win over Utah on September 15.

In Tennessee's 24–24 tie against Army on September 22, Jones rushed for a relatively modest 118 yards and 2 touchdowns. After missing most of the Auburn game with an injury, Jones ran for 94 yards and a 4th-quarter touchdown in Tennessee's 43–30 loss to Florida, though he was largely outshone by teammate Tony Robinson's record-setting performance at quarterback.

For the second straight season, Jones scored what would be the winning touchdown in Tennessee's game against Alabama. With the Vols trailing 27–20 with less than five minutes remaining, Jones' teammate Andre Creamer returned a punt to the Alabama 11-yard line, and Jones scored from a yard out two plays later. Robinson scored the two-point conversion on a fake pitch to Jones to seal the win for the Vols, 28–27.

Jones rushed for 102 yards on 22 carries in Tennessee's 24–21 win over Georgia Tech on October 27, and ran for 85 yards, including a 19-yard touchdown that sparked a 3rd-quarter rally, in the Vols' 41–17 win over Ole Miss. He capped the regular season with 128 yards against Kentucky and 119 yards against Vanderbilt. He was held to just 69 yards in Tennessee's 28–27 loss to Maryland in the Sun Bowl.

For the season, Jones rushed for 1,290 yards and 10 touchdowns on 229 attempts, breaking the school's single-season record for rushing yards he had set the previous year. He led the SEC in rushing yardage, and was fifth in the nation behind Keith Byars, Rueben Mayes, Kenneth Davis, and Steve Morgan. Jones was selected to participate in the annual East–West Shrine Game, which was played on January 5, 1985.

=== Records ===
During his four years at Tennessee, Jones rushed for 2,852 yards and 19 touchdowns on 517 attempts, breaking the school's career rushing record. He also caught 26 passes for 220 yards and a touchdown, giving him over 3,000 total career yards. Jones' career rushing record was eventually broken by James "Little Man" Stewart, who rushed for 2,890 yards from 1991 to 1994, and he remains the school's fourth all-time leading rusher behind Travis Henry (3,078 yards, 1997–2000), Arian Foster (2,964 yards, 2005–2008), and Stewart.

Jones' single-season record of 1,290 rushing yards was broken by Jay Graham, who rushed for 1,438 yards in 1995, and has since been surpassed by Jamal Lewis (1,364 in 1997), Travis Henry (1,314 in 2000), Travis Stephens (1,461 in 2001), and Montario Hardesty (1,345 in 2009), leaving Jones at sixth place. Jones' single-game rushing record of 248 yards was eventually broken by Chuck Webb, who surpassed the mark twice in 1989 (294 yards against Ole Miss, and 250 against Arkansas), and was matched by Tony Thompson against Mississippi State in 1990, leaving Jones tied for third. His 234-yard mark against Rutgers remains the school's sixth-highest single-game total.

Jones' 41 rushing attempts against Rutgers remains a school record, though he now shares it with Stephens, who rushed 41 times against Arkansas in 2001. His six consecutive games of 100 or more rushing yards is the second most in school history (Graham had 9 in 1995), and his 13 total games of 100 or more yards rushing remains the third highest in school history, behind Henry's 15 and Graham's 14. Jones' three games of 200 or more yards rushing remains a school record.

== Professional career ==
In the 1985 NFL draft, Jones was selected by the Seattle Seahawks in the fifth round as the 137th overall pick. He signed with the Seahawks in July 1985, but was waived in August. He signed briefly with the Houston Oilers in May 1986.

In 1987, Jones joined the Hamilton Tiger-Cats of the Canadian Football League. Riding a strong second half of the season, he finished with 408 yards rushing and a touchdown on 77 attempts, to go along with 210 receiving yards on 27 catches. He was Hamilton's nominee for the league's Most Outstanding Rookie Award, but did not win. Jones was injured during much of the 1988 season, and a bad knee and nagging hamstring injury eventually forced his retirement from the game. In 1990, Jones played in the Arena Football League for the Albany Firebirds. He ran for 144 yards and three touchdowns.

== Policing, recognition and personal life ==
Jones returned to his native Munford in 1991 to pursue a career in law enforcement. He works as a school resource officer for Tipton County and is a part-time patrolman in Munford. He also helps coach running backs at Munford High School.

In August 2003, Jones was honored as a Vol "Legend of the Game", along with former teammate Bruce Wilkerson, during the pregame ceremonies of Tennessee's game against Fresno State. In 2018, a street in Munford was named "Johnnie Jones Drive" in his honor.

Jones and his wife, Trena, have three daughters.
