= Lester McClain =

American football player (born 1949)

Lester McClain (born September 17, 1949) is a former American football wide receiver and the first African American to play at the University of Tennessee. He joined the Volunteers in 1967, and played for them between 1968 and 1970 (freshmen were ineligible to play varsity prior to the 1970s). He was drafted by the Chicago Bears in the 9th round (220th overall) of the 1971 NFL draft, but was cut prior to the season. He attended Antioch High School in Antioch, Tennessee.

During his three seasons at Tennessee, he caught 70 passes for 1,003 yards and 10 touchdowns. He also rushed 30 times for 123 yards and two touchdowns, and returned eight kickoffs for 168 yards.

== See also ==
- 1970 Tennessee Volunteers football team
- List of Tennessee Volunteers in the NFL draft
- 1971 NFL draft
