= Rudy Mucha =

American football player (1918–1982)

No. 27, 16
- Positions: Guard, Center

Personal information
- Born: July 22, 1918; Chicago, Illinois, U.S.
- Died: September 7, 1982 (aged 64); Blue Island, Illinois, U.S.
- Listed height: 6 ft 1 in (1.85 m)
- Listed weight: 236 lb (107 kg)

Career information
- High school: Fenger (Chicago)
- College: Washington (1937-1940)
- NFL draft: 1941: 1st round, 4th overall pick

Career history
- Cleveland Rams (1941, 1945); Chicago Bears (1945–1946)

Awards and highlights
- 2× NFL champion (1945, 1946); Consensus All-American (1940); First-team All-PCC (1940); Second-team All-PCC (1939)

Career NFL statistics
- Punts: 34
- Punting yards: 1,384
- Longest punt: 53
- Stats at Pro Football Reference

Rudolph John Mucha (July 22, 1918 – September 7, 1982) was an American professional football guard for the Cleveland Rams and the Chicago Bears of the National Football League (NFL). He was also a consensus All-American collegiate center for the University of Washington in 1940. Mucha was the first Washington Husky in school history to be taken in the first round of the NFL Draft. He went fourth overall in the first round of the 1941 NFL draft. Mucha was named to the 1939 College Football All Polish-American Team.
