= Bob Foxx =

American football player and coach (1917–1975)

Tennessee Volunteers
- Position: Halfback

Personal information
- Born: September 15, 1917; Knoxville, Tennessee, U.S.
- Died: June 22, 1975 (aged 57)
- Listed height: 5 ft 11 in (1.80 m)
- Listed weight: 185 lb (84 kg)

Career information
- College: Tennessee (1938–1940)

Awards and highlights
- Second-team All-American (1940); Co-SEC Player of the Year (1939); 2× First-team All-SEC (1939, 1940)

Robert Morgan Foxx (September 15, 1917 – June 22, 1975) was an American football player. He played college football for the Tennessee Volunteers football team from 1938 to 1940 and was selected by the International News Service as a second-team player on the 1940 College Football All-America Team. In a poll of Knoxville Journal readers, Foxx was voted Knoxville's greatest athlete of the first half of the 20th century.

Foxx was inducted into the Tennessee Sports Hall of Fame in 1968. He played minor league baseball in 1941. He also was hired as an assistant football coach at Tennessee in 1941.
