= Ed Cifers =

American football player (1916–2005)

No. 43, 14
- Position: End

Personal information
- Born: July 18, 1916; Church Hill, Tennessee, U.S.
- Died: July 19, 2005 (aged 89); Knoxville, Tennessee, U.S.
- Listed height: 6 ft 2 in (1.88 m)
- Listed weight: 227 lb (103 kg)

Career information
- High school: Dobyns-Bennett (Kingsport, Tennessee)
- College: Tennessee (1937-1940)
- NFL draft: 1941: 6th round, 50th overall pick

Career history
- Washington Redskins (1941–1942, 1946); Chicago Bears (1947–1948)

Awards and highlights
- NFL champion (1942); Pro Bowl (1942); 2× Second-team All-SEC (1939, 1940)

Career NFL statistics
- Receptions: 37
- Receiving yards: 399
- Touchdowns: 3
- Stats at Pro Football Reference

Edward Clifton Cifers (July 18, 1916 – July 19, 2005) was an American professional football end in the National Football League (NFL) for the Washington Redskins and Chicago Bears. He played college football at the University of Tennessee and was drafted in the sixth round of the 1941 NFL draft.

== Early life ==
Attended Dobyns-Bennett High School in Kingsport, Tennessee, where he was the first All-state high school football selection from Northeast Tennessee.

== College career ==
Cifers played college football at the University of Tennessee and was a part of three SEC championship teams for head coach Robert Neyland.

== Professional career ==
Cifers was a Pro Bowler and named as an All-Pro by the Int. News Service in 1942. He was part of Washington's 1942 NFL Championship team. He was named as an All-Pro for the 1948 season by the Chicago Herald Am.

== Military career ==
In 1942, Cifers enlisted in the military during World War II.
