= Johnstonville, Georgia =

Unincorporated community in Georgia, U.S.

Coordinates: 33°05′22″N 84°04′28″W

Johnstonville is an unincorporated community in Lamar County, in the U.S. state of Georgia.

== History ==
Johnstonville was founded in 1821, and served as temporary county seat. A post office called Johnstonville was established in 1839, and remained in operation until 1905. The community most likely was named after one of two Johnston family of pioneer settlers.
