= Murders of Nicholas Smarr and Jody Smith =

2016 crime in Georgia, United States

- Location: Americus, Georgia
- Date: Wednesday, December 7, 2016 (UTC−06:00)
- Attack type: Shooting
- Deaths: 3 (including the perpetrator)
- Perpetrator: Minguell Lembrick

The murders of Nicholas Smarr and Jody Smith occurred on December 7, 2016, when 32-year-old Minguell Lembrick shot and killed two police officers, Nick Smarr and Jody Smith, in Americus, Georgia while they were responding to a domestic violence situation. Lembrick ran away to his girlfriend's house before the authorities tracked him down and committed suicide the next day before SWAT officers entered the house. The incident received national attention because of the long-time friendship between Nick Smarr and Jody Smith.

== Background ==
=== Nick Smarr ===
Nicholas Ryan “Nick” Smarr Smarr worked for Sumter County Sheriff's Office and McRae Police Department until 2014, then worked with Vienna Police Department for 6 months before finally working for Americus Police Department. He was a member of the United States Marine Corps Reserves since August 2014, at the time of his death, he was at the rank of Lance Corporal.

=== Jody Smith ===
Jody worked with Telfair County Sheriff’s Department and Sumter County Sheriff’s Department until 2014, when he joined and worked with Wheeler County Sheriff’s Department, Alamo Police Department, Lumber City Police Department, and Glenwood Police Department until 2015, before working again with Sumter County Sheriff’s Department until he joined and worked with Georgia Southwestern State University Department of Public Safety and Plains Police Department in August 2016.

== Shooting ==
On December 7, 2016, just after 10 a.m., Officers Smarr and Smith responded to a domestic violence situation caused by Lembrick which resulted in their deaths by a single gunshot wound in the head.

== Aftermath ==
Both officers were transported to Phoebe Sumter Regional Hospital where Smarr was pronounced dead. Smith was flown to a trauma center in Macon, Georgia, where he died the following day. The same day, a reward totaling $70,000 was offered to anyone with information that would lead to Lembrick's arrest. Lembrick committed suicide in his girlfriend's house in Dixon Drive before SWAT officers enter the house after a massive hunt from over 20 law enforcement agencies. Smarr was the first Americus Police Officer to be killed in the line of duty for 33 years. Smith was the first Georgia Southwestern State University Department of Public Safety Officer to be killed in the line of duty for 110 years. Officers Smarr and Smith were the 136th and 137th police officers to be killed in the line of duty in 2016.

== Awards and honors ==
- On April 27, 2017: Georgia Southwestern State University Department of Public Safety building was named the "Nicholas Smarr & Jody Smith Memorial Building" for the fallen officers.
- On December 7, 2017: Americus city, the Smarr and Smith families, the state of Georgia, and its law enforcement agencies founded a network website called The Smarr and Smith Foundation to memorialize the friendship of Officers Smith and Smarr and tell the nation about uniting against danger.
- On December 7, 2018: Nick Smarr was posthumously awarded the Navy and Marine Corps Medal, which was received by Janice Smarr, for his actions on the day of the shooting.
