= Smarr, Georgia =

- Unincorporated community Census-designated place
- Location within Georgia Location within the United States
- Coordinates: 32°59′07″N 83°52′56″W
- Country: United States
- State: Georgia
- County: Monroe

Area
  - Total: 1.70 sq mi (4.4 km^{2})
  - Land: 1.70 sq mi (4.4 km^{2})
  - Water: 0.0 sq mi (0 km^{2})
- Elevation: 615 ft (187 m)

Population (2020)
  - Total: 218
  - Density: 128/sq mi (49.5/km^{2})
- Demonym: Smartians
- Time zone: UTC−5 (Eastern (EST))
  - Summer (DST): UTC−4 (EDT)
- ZIP Code: 31029 (Forsyth)
- FIPS code: 13-71296
- GNIS feature ID: 333068

Smarr is an unincorporated community and census-designated place (CDP) in Monroe County, in the U.S. state of Georgia. The 2020 census listed a population of 218.

== History ==
Smarr was established in 1838 when the railroad was extended to that point, and named for the founder.

Variant names were "Smarrs" and "Smarrs Station". A post office called Smarr's Station was established in 1872, and the name was shortened to Smarrs in 1895.

== Geography ==
Smarr is in central Monroe County on U.S. Route 41, which leads northwest 5 miles (8 km) to Forsyth, the county seat, and southeast 20 miles (32 km) to Macon.

According to the U.S. Census Bureau, the Smarr CDP has an area of 1.7 square miles (4.4 km^{2}), all land.

== Demographics ==
Historical population
Census	Pop.	Note	%±
2020	218		—
U.S. Decennial Census; 2020

Smarr was first listed as a census designated place in the 2020 U.S. census.

Smarr CDP, Georgia – Racial and ethnic composition Note: the US Census treats Hispanic/Latino as an ethnic category. This table excludes Latinos from the racial categories and assigns them to a separate category. Hispanics/Latinos may be of any race.
Race / Ethnicity (NH = Non-Hispanic)	Pop 2020	% 2020
White alone (NH)	198	90.83%
Black or African American alone (NH)	2	0.92%
Native American or Alaska Native alone (NH)	0	0.00%
Asian alone (NH)	0	0.00%
Pacific Islander alone (NH)	0	0.00%
Other Race alone (NH)	1	0.46%
Mixed race or Multiracial (NH)	9	4.13%
Hispanic or Latino (any race)	8	3.67%
Total	218	100.00%
