= Abe Shires =

American football player (1917–1993)

No. 72
- Position: Tackle

Personal information
- Born: February 12, 1917; Alderson, West Virginia, U.S.
- Died: July 23, 1993 (aged 76); Sacramento, California, U.S.
- Listed height: 6 ft 2 in (1.88 m)
- Listed weight: 220 lb (100 kg)

Career information
- High school: Alderson
- College: Tennessee (1937-1940)
- NFL draft: 1941: 2nd round, 14th overall pick

Career history
- Philadelphia Eagles (1945); Los Angeles Rams (1946)*
- * Offseason or practice squad member only

Awards and highlights
- Third-team All-American (1940); 2× First-team All-SEC (1939, 1940); Second-team All-SEC (1938)

Career NFL statistics
- Games played: 7
- Stats at Pro Football Reference

Marshall Abraham Shires (February 12, 1917 – July 23, 1993) was an American professional football player. He played college football for the Tennessee Volunteers football team and was selected by the Central Press Association as a third-team tackle on the 1940 College Football All-America Team. During Shires' three years at Tennessee (1938–1940), the Volunteers compiled a 31–2 record, won three SEC championships and two national championships, and participated in the Orange, Rose, and Sugar Bowls. He was drafted by the Cleveland Rams in the second round with the 14th overall pick in the 1941 NFL draft. However, due to military service during World War II, Shires did not make his debut in the National Football League until the 1945 NFL season and as a member of the Philadelphia Eagles. He was inducted into the Tennessee Sports Hall of Fame in 1995.
