= 7 Little Johnstons =

Television series

- Genre: Reality
- Country of origin: United States
- Original language: English
- No. of seasons: 17
- No. of episodes: 160

Production
- Camera setup: Multi-camera
- Production company: Figure 8 Films

Original release
- Network: TLC
- Release: January 6, 2015 – present

7 Little Johnstons is an American reality television series that premiered January 6, 2015 and is produced for and aired on TLC. The series revolves around the Johnstons, a family of seven who live with dwarfism.

== Synopsis ==
The series follows Trent and Amber Johnston and their five children, all of whom have achondroplasia dwarfism, as they navigate life in Georgia. Episodes document the family's everyday life, including parenting, relationships, home renovations, and challenges related to living with dwarfism.

== Cast ==
- Trent Johnston
- Amber Johnston
- Jonah Trent Johnston
- Anna Marie Johnston
- Elizabeth Renee Johnston
- Joseph "Alex" Johnston
- Emma Lee Johnston

== Episodes ==
=== Series overview ===
Season	Episodes	Originally released	
Season	Episodes	First released	Last released
1	8	January 6, 2015	April 28, 2015
2	11	November 3, 2015	December 29, 2015
3	8	May 1, 2017	June 20, 2017
4	6	September 18, 2017	October 24, 2017
5	10	October 30, 2018	December 18, 2018
6	8	April 2, 2019	May 21, 2019
7	10	March 31, 2020	June 2, 2020
8	8	December 29, 2020	February 16, 2021
9	8	May 25, 2021	July 13, 2021
10	8	November 16, 2021	January 4, 2022
11	8	March 15, 2022	May 3, 2022
12	10	August 16, 2022	October 18, 2022
13	10	April 18, 2023	June 20, 2023
14	17	March 12, 2024	July 2, 2024
15	10	January 7, 2025	March 11, 2025
16	10	October 14, 2025	December 16, 2025
17	10	March 17, 2026	May 12, 2026
18	10	November 17, 2026	TBA

=== Season 1 (2015) ===
No. overall	No. in season	Title	Original release date	US viewers (millions)
1	1	"A Little Home Improvement"	January 6, 2015	N/A
2	2	"Birds and Bees Make Babies"	March 31, 2015	N/A
3	3	"The Chicken Race"	April 7, 2015	N/A
4	4	"What Big Daddy Wants"	April 7, 2015	N/A
5	5	"Reno-cation"	April 14, 2015	N/A
6	6	"Hot Mama"	April 21, 2015	N/A
7	7	"Run, Big Daddy, Run!"	April 21, 2015	N/A
8	8	"Call Off Easter?"	April 28, 2015	N/A

=== Season 2 (2015) ===
No. overall	No. in season	Title	Original release date	US viewers (millions)
9	1	"Your Burning Questions"	November 3, 2015	N/A
10	2	"Girl Looking Rough"	November 10, 2015	N/A
11	3	"Alex Has a Little Crush"	November 17, 2015	N/A
12	4	"Life's Too Short to Be Angry"	November 24, 2015	N/A
13	5	"Drownding' in the Deep End"	December 1, 2015	N/A
14	6	"Couple's Skate"	December 1, 2015	N/A
15	7	"#GoatPoop"	December 8, 2015	N/A
16	8	"There's No 'I' in Trent"	December 8, 2015	N/A
17	9	"My Two Dads"	December 15, 2015	N/A
18	10	"Big Daddy Eagle Scout"	December 22, 2015	N/A
19	11	"Alex's Surgery"	December 29, 2015	N/A

=== Season 3 (2017) ===
No. overall	No. in season	Title	Original release date	US viewers (millions)
20	1	"License to Drive"	May 1, 2017	N/A
21	2	"Brain Surgery for Alex"	May 8, 2017	N/A
22	3	"Loose Lips Sink Surprises"	May 15, 2017	N/A
23	4	"I Just Tinkled"	May 22, 2017	N/A
24	5	"A Little Girl in a Pageant World"	May 29, 2017	N/A
25	6	"A Family Emergency"	June 5, 2017	N/A
26	7	"Party Pooper"	June 12, 2017	N/A
27	8	"8 Little Johnstons?"	June 19, 2017	N/A

=== Season 4 (2017) ===
No. overall	No. in season	Title	Original release date	US viewers (millions)
28	1	"A Little Teen Romance"	September 18, 2017	N/A
29	2	"Little Mama Sells Big Houses"	September 25, 2017	N/A
30	3	"Dad's Wearing Mom's Pants"	October 2, 2017	N/A
31	4	"Tour De Johnston"	October 9, 2017	N/A
32	5	"A Life-Changing Decision"	October 17, 2017	N/A
33	6	"The M Word"	October 24, 2017	N/A

=== Season 5 (2018) ===
No. overall	No. in season	Title	Original release date	US viewers (millions)
34	1	"Mo' House, Mo' Problems"	October 30, 2018	N/A
35	2	"Love Stings"	November 6, 2018	N/A
36	3	"How Elizabeth Got Her Groove Back"	November 13, 2018	N/A
37	4	"Jonah's Grad-itude"	November 20, 2018	N/A
38	5	"Fish Balls"	November 27, 2018	N/A
39	6	"A Tale of Two Rivers"	December 4, 2018	N/A
40	7	"20 Years of Trent & Amber"	December 11, 2018	N/A
41	8	"Love in Lederhosen"	December 11, 2018	N/A
42	9	"Trent's Terrible, Horrible, No Good, Very Bad Week"	December 18, 2018	N/A
43	10	"Yo Shawty!"	December 18, 2018	N/A

=== Season 6 (2019) ===
No. overall	No. in season	Title	Original release date	US viewers (millions)
44	1	"We're Off to See the Wizard"	April 2, 2019	N/A
45	2	"The Nightmare Before Christmas"	April 9, 2019	N/A
46	3	"Little Johnstons, Big Apple"	April 16, 2019	N/A
47	4	"That Was a Race?"	April 23, 2019	N/A
48	5	"Valentines or Broken Hearts?"	April 30, 2019	N/A
49	6	"Picture Them Naked"	May 7, 2019	N/A
50	7	"The Promposal"	May 14, 2019	N/A
51	8	"A Prom Kiss & a Prom Diss"	May 21, 2019	N/A

=== Season 7 (2020) ===
No. overall	No. in season	Title	Original release date	US viewers (millions)
52	1	"Summer Lovin'"	March 31, 2020	N/A
53	2	"Anna Ate My Homework"	April 7, 2020	N/A
54	3	"We Came from Uranus"	April 14, 2020	N/A
55	4	"It's a Boy!"	April 21, 2020	N/A
56	5	"Naked and Annoyed"	April 28, 2020	N/A
57	6	"If This RV's 'A-Rockin"	May 5, 2020	N/A
58	7	"It's a Small World"	May 12, 2020	N/A
59	8	"That's Cringey!"	May 19, 2020	N/A
60	9	"School Rules"	May 26, 2020	N/A
61	10	"I'm Not Dying!"	June 2, 2020	N/A

=== Season 8 (2020-21) ===
No. overall	No. in season	Title	Original release date	US viewers (millions)
62	1	"Love in the Time of Corona"	December 29, 2020	N/A
63	2	"What's Cooking, Good Looking?"	January 5, 2021	N/A
64	3	"Did Somebody Shrink You?"	January 12, 2021	N/A
65	4	"Are You Gonna Marry Liz?"	January 19, 2021	N/A
66	5	"Chasing Waterfalls"	January 26, 2021	N/A
67	6	"Who Is Thyself?"	February 2, 2021	N/A
68	7	"Slumdog Pavillionaire"	February 9, 2021	N/A
69	8	"A Thanksgiving Ultimatum"	February 16, 2021	N/A

=== Season 9 (2021) ===
No. overall	No. in season	Title	Original release date	US viewers (millions)
70	1	"Holiday Hangover"	May 25, 2021	N/A
71	2	"Any Place but Home"	June 1, 2021	N/A
72	3	"A New Year, a New Us?"	June 7, 2021	N/A
73	4	"My Farty Valentine"	June 14, 2021	N/A
74	5	"A Kick In The Head"	June 21, 2021	N/A
75	6	"I Only Poop Twice a Week"	June 28, 2021	N/A
76	7	"I'm a Huge Wimp"	July 5, 2021	N/A
77	8	"Liz Leaves the Nest"	July 12, 2021	N/A

=== Season 10 (2021-22) ===
No. overall	No. in season	Title	Original release date	US viewers (millions)
78	1	"Sayonara, Sister!"	November 16, 2021	0.95
79	2	"Anna's in the Dog House"	November 23, 2021	0.82
80	3	"From Croquet to Crochet"	November 30, 2021	0.85
81	4	"Buggin' Out"	December 7, 2021	0.65
82	5	"Take This Job and Shove It!"	December 14, 2021	0.93
83	6	"Choppy Waters"	December 21, 2021	0.78
84	7	"Trent's Funemployment"	December 28, 2021	N/A
85	8	"The Big Finnish"	January 4, 2022	N/A

=== Season 11 (2022) ===
No. overall	No. in season	Title	Original release date	US viewers (millions)
86	1	"The Finnish Are Coming!"	March 15, 2022	0.74
87	2	"Friday Night Heights"	March 22, 2022	0.82
88	3	"Wife Carrying"	March 29, 2022	0.78
89	4	"The Cranberry Massacre"	April 5, 2022	0.76
90	5	"Mr. Joose Goes to Washington"	April 12, 2022	0.75
91	6	"Are You Kissing?"	April 19, 2022	0.78
92	7	"Coming Clean"	April 26, 2022	0.94
93	8	"The Finn-ale"	May 3, 2022	N/A

=== Season 12 (2022) ===
No. overall	No. in season	Title	Original release date	US viewers (millions)
94	1	"Eyebrows and Anxiety"	August 16, 2022	N/A
95	2	"When Death Does Us Apart"	August 23, 2022	N/A
96	3	"Sleepless in Forsyth"	August 30, 2022	N/A
97	4	"Adventures in PR"	September 6, 2022	0.80
98	5	"Dating and Skating"	September 13, 2022	0.83
99	6	"Lettuce Get It On"	September 20, 2022	0.75
100	7	"Bomp Chicka Bow Wow Bench"	September 27, 2022	0.79
101	8	"Big Daddy's Lil Premiere"	October 4, 2022	0.86
102	9	"Pickleball and Perms"	October 11, 2022	0.95
103	10	"Lotsa Little Lovin'"	October 18, 2022	0.90

=== Season 13 (2023) ===
No. overall	No. in season	Title	Original release date	US viewers (millions)
104	1	"Love on the Brain"	April 18, 2023	N/A
105	2	"Om Sweet Home"	April 25, 2023	N/A
106	3	"Oh Lover Boy"	May 2, 2023	N/A
107	4	"Homecoming and Going"	May 9, 2023	N/A
108	5	"Reindeer Games"	May 16, 2023	N/A
109	6	"Desperately Seeking Santa"	May 23, 2023	N/A
110	7	"Little House of Horrors"	May 30, 2023	N/A
111	8	"Let's Get Physical"	June 6, 2023	N/A
112	9	"Trent's Yule Log"	June 13, 2023	N/A
113	10	"Romance or Roommates?"	June 20, 2023	0.71

=== Season 14 (2024) ===
No. overall	No. in season	Title	Original release date	US viewers (millions)
114	1	"The Rest Is Still Unwritten"	March 12, 2024	N/A
115	2	"Breakup, Alt, Delete"	March 19, 2024	N/A
116	3	"Pimp-A-Trent"	March 26, 2024	N/A
117	4	"The Cupid Shuffle"	April 2, 2024	N/A
118	5	"Cool for the Summer"	April 9, 2024	N/A
119	6	"Emma in Charge"	April 16, 2024	N/A
120	7	"Truth or Dare"	April 23, 2024	N/A
121	8	"I Almost Patio Drowned!"	April 30, 2024	N/A
122	9	"Keep the Johnstons Weird"	May 7, 2024	N/A
123	10	"One More Little Johnston?"	May 14, 2024	N/A
124	11	"The Icing on the Cake"	May 21, 2024	N/A
125	12	"The Measure of a Life"	May 28, 2024	N/A
126	13	"Tall or Small"	June 4, 2024	N/A
127	14	"Burpees and Burp Clothes"	June 11, 2024	N/A
128	15	"The Diapers They Are a Changin'"	June 11, 2024	N/A
129	16	"Birthday Maneuvers"	June 18, 2024	N/A
130	17	"Big Baby, Little World"	June 25, 2024	N/A

=== Season 15 (2025) ===
No. overall	No. in season	Title	Original release date	US viewers (millions)
131	1	"Party in My Crib"	January 7, 2025	0.64
132	2	"A White-ish Christmas"	January 14, 2025	0.60
133	3	"Skating on Thin Ice"	January 21, 2025	0.54
134	4	"The Red Flags of Dating"	January 28, 2025	0.55
135	5	"Forget Boys, Get Money"	February 4, 2025	0.48
136	6	"Parents Just Don't Understand"	February 11, 2025	0.49
137	7	"A Sudden Loss"	February 18, 2025	0.30
138	8	"Green, Eggs and Glam"	February 25, 2025	0.42
139	9	"Dancing On My Own"	March 4, 2025	N/A
140	10	"Roots of Resentment"	March 11, 2025	N/A

=== Season 16 (2025) ===
No. overall	No. in season	Title	Original release date	US viewers (millions)
141	1	"Since You've Been Gone"	October 14, 2025	N/A
142	2	"Too Little Too Late"	October 21, 2025	N/A
143	3	"An Empty Seat at the Table"	October 28, 2025	N/A
144	4	"Little Cheaters"	November 4, 2025	N/A
145	5	"A Bitter Reunion"	November 11, 2025	N/A
146	6	"Falling For You"	November 18, 2025	N/A
147	7	"The Big One, Minus One"	November 25, 2025	N/A
148	8	"What the Duck?"	December 2, 2025	N/A
149	9	"Away in a Manger"	December 9, 2025	N/A
150	10	"Ring in The New Year?"	December 16, 2025	N/A

=== Season 17 (2026) ===
No. overall	No. in season	Title	Original release date	US viewers (millions)
151	1	"The Finnish Are Coming!"	March 17, 2026	N/A
152	2	"Friday Night Heights"	March 17, 2026	N/A
153	3	"It's Giving Bridesmaids"	March 24, 2026	N/A
154	4	"POV: You're Raising a Pig"	March 31, 2026	N/A
155	5	"Wedding Budget Has Entered the Chat"	April 7, 2026	N/A
156	6	"Main Character at the Bachelorette Party"	April 14, 2026	N/A
157	7	"POV: Now You're Training a Chicken"	April 21, 2026	N/A
158	8	"He's Low-Key Chopping Down a Tree"	April 28, 2026	N/A
159	9	"The Rain is Giving Me The Ick"	May 5, 2026	N/A
160	10	"10 Out of 10 Wedding"	May 12, 2026	N/A

=== Season 18 (2026) ===
No. overall	No. in season	Title	Original release date	US viewers (millions)
161	1	"Your Whole Life Is About To Change"	November 17, 2026	N/A
162	2	TBA	November 24, 2026	N/A
163	3	TBA	December 1, 2026	N/A
164	4	TBA	December 8, 2026	N/A
165	5	TBA	December 15, 2026	N/A
166	6	TBA	December 22, 2026	N/A
167	7	TBA	December 29, 2026	N/A
168	8	TBA	January 5, 2027	N/A
169	9	TBA	January 12, 2026	N/A
170	10	TBA	January 19, 2026	N/A
