= Rum Creek (Ocmulgee River tributary) =

Stream in Georgia, U.S.

Coordinates: 32°59′51.49″N 83°43′24.64″W

Rum Creek is a stream in the U.S. state of Georgia. It is a tributary to the Ocmulgee River.

Rum Creek was named for the fact a sugarcane mill on its banks also distilled rum as a side business.
