= Reggie McKenzie (linebacker) =

American football player and executive (born 1963)

Tennessee Titans
- Title: Vice president of football advisor

Personal information
- Born: February 8, 1963 (age 63); Knoxville, Tennessee, U.S.
- Listed height: 6 ft 1 in (1.85 m)
- Listed weight: 240 lb (109 kg)

Career information
- Position: Linebacker (No. 54, 50)
- High school: Austin-East (Knoxville)
- College: Tennessee
- NFL draft: 1985: 10th round, 275th overall pick

Career history

Playing
- Los Angeles Raiders (1985–1988); Phoenix Cardinals (1989–1990); Montreal Machine (1992); San Francisco 49ers (1992)

Operations
- Green Bay Packers (1994–1996) Pro personnel assistant; Green Bay Packers (1997–2007) Pro personnel director; Green Bay Packers (2008–2011) Director of football operations; Oakland Raiders (2012–2018) General manager; Miami Dolphins (2019–2024) Senior personnel executive; Tennessee Titans (2025–present) Vice president of football advisor

Awards and highlights
- 2× Super Bowl champion (XXXI, XLV); Tennessee Sports Hall of Fame (2018)

Career NFL statistics
- Sacks: 3
- Interceptions: 2
- Fumble recoveries: 1
- Stats at Pro Football Reference
- Executive profile at Pro Football Reference

Reginald McKenzie (born February 8, 1963) is an American professional football executive and former player who is a vice president of football advisor for the Tennessee Titans of the National Football League (NFL). He previously served as the general manager of the Oakland Raiders of the NFL from January 5, 2012, until his firing on December 10, 2018. Previously, McKenzie was a linebacker for the Raiders, a director of player personnel for the Green Bay Packers and a senior personnel executive for the Miami Dolphins. He played college football at Tennessee.

== Playing career ==
=== Austin-East High School ===
McKenzie played high school football at Austin-East High School. He was a consensus All-State linebacker during his senior year, and was considered the 22nd best player in the state by the Knoxville News Sentinel. He was a teammate of Raiders Director of Player Personnel, Joey Clinkscales. McKenzie was valedictorian of his 1981 graduating class.

=== University of Tennessee ===
McKenzie played collegiate football at the University of Tennessee from 1981 through the 1984 season. In 1981, he played in 11 games, tallying 20 tackles (nine solo). During his sophomore season in 1982, he picked up 33 tackles (18 solo). Playing in 11 games as a junior in 1983, he tallied 32 tackles (18 solo), including three sacks. During his senior year, he registered 89 tackles (63 solo), including a sack, as well as an interception and two fumble recoveries, as part of a linebacker corps that included Carl Zander, Alvin Toles, and Dale Jones.

=== Los Angeles Raiders ===
The then-Los Angeles Raiders drafted McKenzie in the tenth round of the 1985 NFL Draft with the 275th overall selection. From 1985 to 1988, McKenzie played as a linebacker for the Los Angeles Raiders. He became a starter as a rookie at inside linebacker next to Matt Millen in a 3–4–4 defensive scheme, playing in all 16 games for a team ending the year with a won–loss record of 12–4, allowing 308 points (19.2 points/game), ninth of 28 teams, and winning the AFC Western Division. Los Angeles lost their divisional round to the 1985 New England Patriots, having difficulty stopping a running game which amassed 156 yards against them, led by Craig James' 104 yards behind an offensive line which featured John Hannah at left guard and Brian Holloway at left tackle. It was McKenzie's only playoff appearance. McKenzie also started all 16 games the following year, but at outside linebacker in a 4–3–4 scheme, with Matt Millen inside and Jerry Robinson on the other side. The Raiders ended with a record of 8–8 and allowed 346 points (21.6 points/game), 19th among 28 teams. He returned as an inside linebacker in a 3–4–4 defensive scheme during the 1987 NFL season, the strike year, but started only five games, sharing time with Jerry Robinson next to Matt Millen, then only three the following year, his final one as a Raider.

=== Time out of the NFL ===
While out of football in 1991, McKenzie spent a season as a defensive coach for Dorsey High School in Los Angeles. He then played with the Montreal Machine of the World League of American Football in the spring of 1992.

=== San Francisco 49ers ===
After sitting out three years, McKenzie came back in 1992 as a member of the San Francisco 49ers, but played in only two games.

== Coaching and administrative career ==
=== University of Tennessee ===
In 1993, McKenzie returned to Tennessee and served as an assistant under head coach Phillip Fulmer. That year, the Volunteers appeared in the Florida Citrus Bowl and landed one of the nation’s top recruiting classes, highlighted by QB Peyton Manning.

=== Green Bay Packers ===
McKenzie was employed by the Green Bay Packers from 1994 to 2012. He began as a scout, and gradually rose through the ranks to become the Packers' director of player personnel and eventually the team's director of football operations, while reporting to general managers Ron Wolf and Ted Thompson.

=== Oakland Raiders ===
McKenzie was hired as general manager of the Oakland Raiders on January 5, 2012. Longtime owner Al Davis had been general manager since 1966, and retained control over football operations after becoming principal owner in 1972. Both Wolf (who had worked in the Raiders front office prior to his Green Bay tenure) and former Raiders coach John Madden recommended McKenzie to new owner Mark Davis, who hired McKenzie after an interview conducted jointly by Davis and Madden.

McKenzie promptly fired head coach Hue Jackson and hired Dennis Allen, who had previously served as the defensive coordinator of a Denver Broncos squad that barely beat Oakland for a playoff spot. He brought in his twin brother Raleigh McKenzie to become a college scout for the Raiders. McKenzie's first priority was to shore up a porous defense which allowed 433 points (27.1 points/game), 29th among 32 teams. Before the 2012 NFL draft, he signed four free agents to help the defense: outside linebacker Philip Wheeler and cornerbacks Shawntae Spencer, Ron Bartell, and Pat Lee.

McKenzie inherited a roster full of high-priced and underperforming players, with more than $154 million committed toward the $120.6 million salary cap. Additionally, the Raiders had traded away most of their draft picks in the 2012 NFL draft prior to his arrival, leaving McKenzie with his first pick at No. 95 overall with offensive lineman Tony Bergstrom. The Raiders struggled to a 4–12 record during his first season with the Raiders.

During the 2013 offseason, McKenzie released several starting players such as Richard Seymour, Michael Huff, Tommy Kelly, Darrius Heyward-Bey, and Rolando McClain and traded away starting quarterback Carson Palmer in continuing the rebuilding process. However, the Raiders' struggles (and double-digit losses) continued until the 2015 season, when the combination of new head coach Jack Del Rio and standout draftees Khalil Mack, Derek Carr and Amari Cooper led to a 7–9 resurgence.

On July 29, 2016, Mark Davis announced a four-year contract extension for McKenzie, keeping him with the Raiders through 2020.

On January 19, 2017, following the Raiders' 12–4 regular season featuring strong performances by Carr, Mack, Cooper, and others, McKenzie was named the 2016 NFL Executive of the Year by the Pro Football Writers of America.

However, the Raiders' success under McKenzie would prove short-lived. 2017 saw the Raiders produce a disappointing 6–10 record, leading to Del Rio's dismissal and replacement by returning head coach Jon Gruden. Gruden was given near-total authority over the team by Davis, which led to the trades of Mack and Cooper and the departures of a number of McKenzie's draft selections.

On December 10, 2018, McKenzie was fired by the Raiders.

=== Miami Dolphins ===
On February 16, 2019, McKenzie was hired by the Miami Dolphins as a senior personnel executive.

=== Tennessee Titans ===
On January 30, 2025, McKenzie was hired by the Tennessee Titans under the role of vice president/football advisor.

== Tennessee Sports Hall of Fame ==
McKenzie and his twin brother Raleigh McKenzie were inducted into the Tennessee Sports Hall of Fame on June 16, 2018. Raleigh, like his brother Reggie, started as a linebacker, but transitioned to the center position after his freshman year. The other members of his induction class included Joe Allison, Blaine Bishop, Isabelle Daniels Holston, Allan Houston, Johnnie Jones, Tim Mack, Glenn McCadams, Jackie Pope, and George Quarles.

== Personal life ==
McKenzie was born in Knoxville, Tennessee on February 8, 1963. McKenzie and his wife, June, have two daughters, Jasmin and Mahkayla, and two sons, Kahlil and Jalen. Kahlil was a five-star defensive tackle at Clayton Valley Charter High School in Concord (Class of 2015), and currently plays for the Baltimore Ravens. Jalen was a four star recruit who committed to USC on January 16, 2017. A three-year starter at OT for USC, Jalen declared for the 2022 NFL draft on December 6, 2021.

McKenzie's Super Bowl ring was stolen on May 3, 2009.

McKenzie's identical twin brother Raleigh also played in the NFL, as a center for the Washington Redskins, Philadelphia Eagles, San Diego Chargers and Green Bay Packers, and served as a Raiders scout during his brother's GM tenure.
