= Forsyth, Georgia =

- City
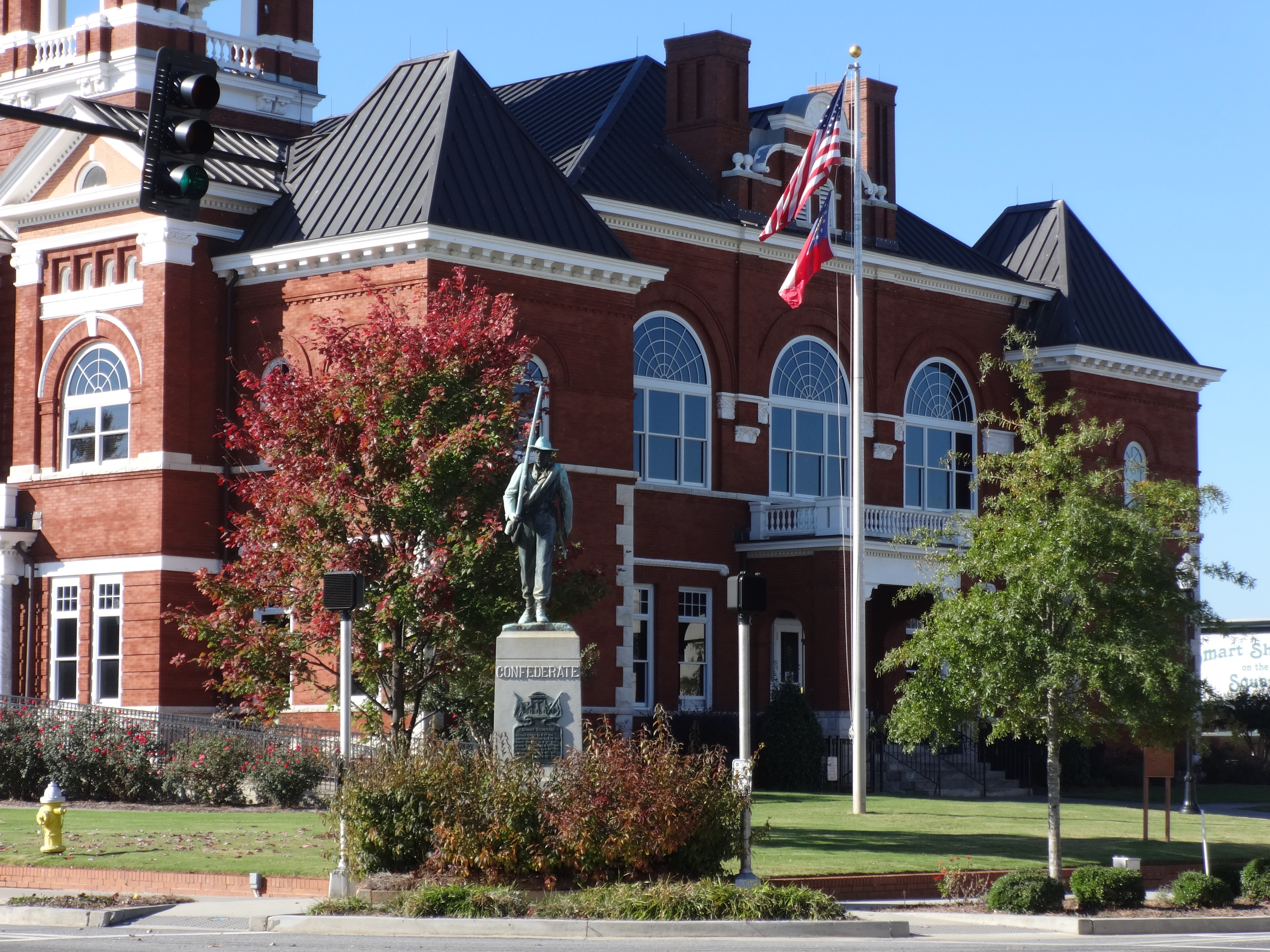
- Monroe County Courthouse and Confederate monument in Forsyth

- Flag Seal Logo
- Motto: "What you need when you need it"
- Location in Monroe County and the state of Georgia
- Coordinates: 33°2′6″N 83°56′17″W
- Country: United States
- State: Georgia
- County: Monroe

Government
  - Mayor: Eric S. Wilson

Area
  - Total: 5.91 sq mi (15.30 km^{2})
  - Land: 5.90 sq mi (15.29 km^{2})
  - Water: 0.0039 sq mi (0.01 km^{2})
- Elevation: 719 ft (219 m)

Population (2020)
  - Total: 4,384
  - Density: 742.4/sq mi (286.65/km^{2})
- Time zone: UTC-5 (Eastern (EST))
  - Summer (DST): UTC-4 (EDT)
- ZIP code: 31029
- Area code: 478
- FIPS code: 13-30732
- GNIS feature ID: 0331748
- Website: cityofforsyth.net

Forsyth is a city in and the county seat of Monroe County, Georgia, United States. The population was 4,384 at the 2020 census, up from 3,788 in 2010. Forsyth is part of the Macon metropolitan statistical area.

The Forsyth Commercial Historic District is listed on the National Register of Historic Places and is a tourist attraction. It includes the Monroe County Courthouse and Courthouse Square as well as the surrounding area, including several examples of 19th-century architecture. Forsyth is also home to the Confederate Cemetery, Tift College, and Rum Creek Wildlife Management Area.

== History ==
Forsyth was established in 1823. That same year, the seat of Monroe County was transferred to Forsyth from Johnstonville. Forsyth was named for John Forsyth, governor of Georgia from 1827 to 1829 and Secretary of State under presidents Andrew Jackson and Martin Van Buren.

== Geography ==
Forsyth is located in central Monroe County at 33°02′06″N 83°56′17″W. The city is located along Interstate 75 and U.S. Route 41 northwest of Macon. I-75 runs southeast to northwest through the eastern part of town, with access from exits 185 through 188. The interstate leads southeast 23 miles (37 km) to downtown Macon and northwest 61 miles (98 km) to Atlanta. US 41 runs through the downtown area from east to west, leading southeast to Macon and west 13 miles (21 km) to Barnesville. Other highways that run through the city include Georgia State Routes 18, 42, and 83.

According to the United States Census Bureau, the city of Forsyth has a total area of 9.0 square miles (23 km^{2}), of which 0.004 square miles (2.6 acres), or 0.04%, are water. The city sits atop a ridge which drains southwest to tributaries of Tobesofkee Creek and northeast to tributaries of Rum Creek; both creeks are southeastward-flowing tributaries of the Ocmulgee River.

== Demographics ==
Historical population
Census	Pop.	Note	%±
1880	1,105		—
1890	920		−16.7%
1900	1,172		27.4%
1910	2,203		88.0%
1920	2,241		1.7%
1930	2,277		1.6%
1940	2,372		4.2%
1950	3,125		31.7%
1960	3,697		18.3%
1970	3,736		1.1%
1980	4,624		23.8%
1990	4,268		−7.7%
2000	3,776		−11.5%
2010	3,788		0.3%
2020	4,384		15.7%
U.S. Decennial Census; 1850-1870 1870-1880; 1890-1910 1920-1930; 1940 1950 1960; 1970 1980 1990; 2000 2010

=== 2020 census ===
As of the 2020 census, Forsyth had a population of 4,384. The median age was 39.1 years. 22.9% of residents were under the age of 18 and 18.9% were 65 years of age or older. For every 100 females there were 84.7 males, and for every 100 females age 18 and over there were 79.5 males age 18 and over.

82.8% of residents lived in urban areas, while 17.2% lived in rural areas.

There were 1,789 households in Forsyth, including 883 families. Of all households, 34.2% had children under the age of 18 living in them, 33.3% were married-couple households, 16.9% were households with a male householder and no spouse or partner present, and 43.3% were households with a female householder and no spouse or partner present. About 31.0% of all households were made up of individuals, and 14.3% had someone living alone who was 65 years of age or older.

There were 1,943 housing units, of which 7.9% were vacant. The homeowner vacancy rate was 1.6% and the rental vacancy rate was 7.5%.

Forsyth racial composition as of 2020
Race	Num.	Perc.
White (non-Hispanic)	1,914	43.66%
Black or African American (non-Hispanic)	2,144	48.91%
Native American	3	0.07%
Asian	50	1.14%
Other/Mixed	157	3.58%
Hispanic or Latino	116	2.65%

== Government ==
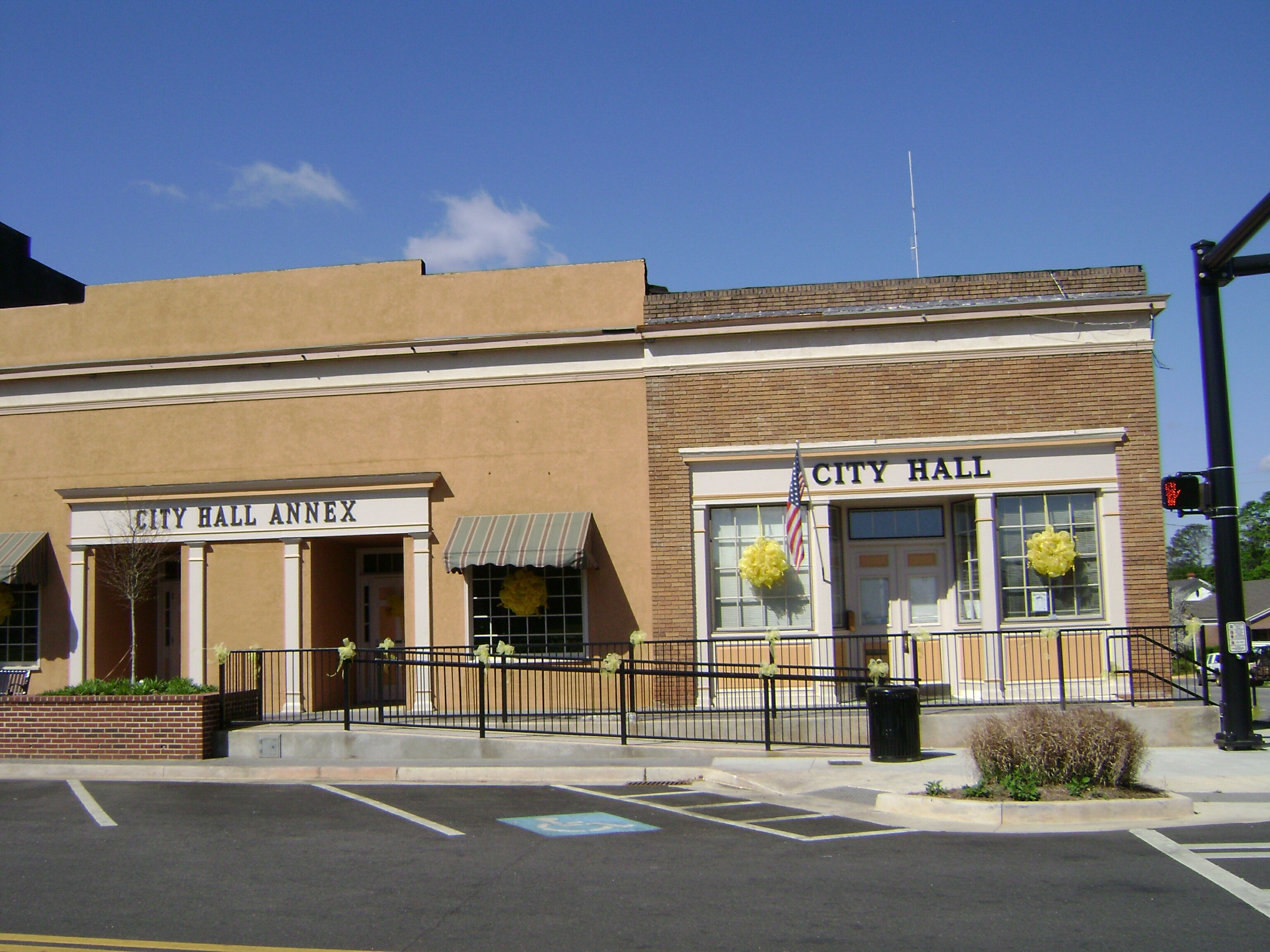
Forsyth City Hall

The Georgia Department of Corrections has moved into the former Tift College site in 2010. Burruss Correctional Training Center is located in Forsyth next to the Georgia Public Safety Training Center.

In November 2011, Forsyth elected John T. Howard, II. Howard, the first African-American elected to the seat, took office in 2012. City Councilman Eric Wilson became mayor in 2015.

== Monroe County School District ==
The Monroe County School District holds pre-school to grade twelve, and consists of three elementary schools, two middle schools, and a high school. The district has 225 full-time teachers and over 3,872 students.

- Samuel E. Hubbard Elementary School
- Katherine B. Sutton Elementary School
- T.G. Scott Elementary School
- Banks Stephens Middle School
- Mary Persons High School

=== Higher education ===
- Tift College was located in Forsyth.

== Notable people ==
- G. Holmes Braddock, politician
- Harold G. Clarke, jurist and legislator
- 7 Little Johnstons, reality TV personality family
- Amber Johnston, mother of TV personality family
- Trent Johnston, father of TV personality family
- Eugene Talmadge, 67th governor of Georgia 1933–1937, 1941–1943
- Malik Herring, a defensive end for the Kansas City Chiefs
