= Raleigh McKenzie =

American football player (born 1963)

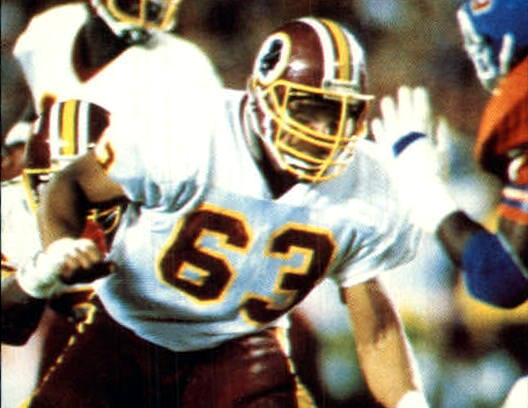
- McKenzie playing for the Redskins in Super Bowl XXII

No. 63
- Positions: Guard, center

Personal information
- Born: February 8, 1963 (age 63); Knoxville, Tennessee, U.S.
- Listed height: 6 ft 2 in (1.88 m)
- Listed weight: 291 lb (132 kg)

Career information
- High school: Austin-East (Knoxville)
- College: Tennessee
- NFL draft: 1985: 11th round, 290th overall pick

Career history
- Washington Redskins (1985–1994); Philadelphia Eagles (1995–1996); San Diego Chargers (1997–1998); Green Bay Packers (1999–2000)

Awards and highlights
- 2× Super Bowl champion (XXII, XXVI); 70 Greatest Redskins

Career NFL statistics
- Games played: 227
- Games started: 184
- Fumble recoveries: 4
- Stats at Pro Football Reference

Raleigh McKenzie (born February 8, 1963) is an American former professional football player who was a guard and center in the National Football League (NFL). During a 16-year football career, he played for four different teams. Raleigh played guard for the Washington Redskins from 1985 to 1994. He was drafted in the 11th round of the 1985 NFL draft by Washington. Nicknamed "Rallo", he played primarily as a reserve during his first season before becoming a vital starter due to injury. He started in each game after that at any of the five positions on the offensive line, but his speciality was center. He played on two Super Bowl champion teams in 1987 and 1991. He was named to the UPI All-NFL Team in 1991. He also played for the Philadelphia Eagles, San Diego Chargers, and Green Bay Packers.

McKenzie attended Austin-East High School in Knoxville, where he and his identical twin brother Reggie played both at linebacker and on the offensive line (future Raiders Director of Player Personnel Joey Clinkscales was among their teammates). Raleigh was named the 11th-best recruit in Tennessee by the Knoxville News Sentinel following his senior year.

The McKenzie brothers played college football for the Tennessee Volunteers from 1981 to 1984. Both played linebacker as freshmen, but Raleigh switched to center during his sophomore season. Playing alongside All-American Bill Mayo and future NFL lineman Bruce Wilkerson, McKenzie anchored a line that helped running back Johnnie Jones set school records for rushing in 1984. McKenzie's position coach was future Vol head coach Phillip Fulmer. In September 2011, the McKenzie brothers were honored as UT "Legends of the Game" during the Vols' game against Cincinnati.

McKenzie joined the Redskins for training camp in 2001 assisting the personnel department. He also ran summer football camp. Before joining his brother in Oakland, Raleigh was an assistant football coach at Herndon High School in Herndon, Virginia. When his brother Reggie was hired as the general manager of the Oakland Raiders, Raleigh joined the team as a scout. After Reggie was fired in late 2018, Raleigh stayed on until after the 2019 NFL draft, when new general manager Mike Mayock announced Raleigh would not be retained.

Both brothers are members of Omega Psi Phi fraternity.
