= 1942 Rose Bowl =

American college football game

- 28th Rose Bowl Game
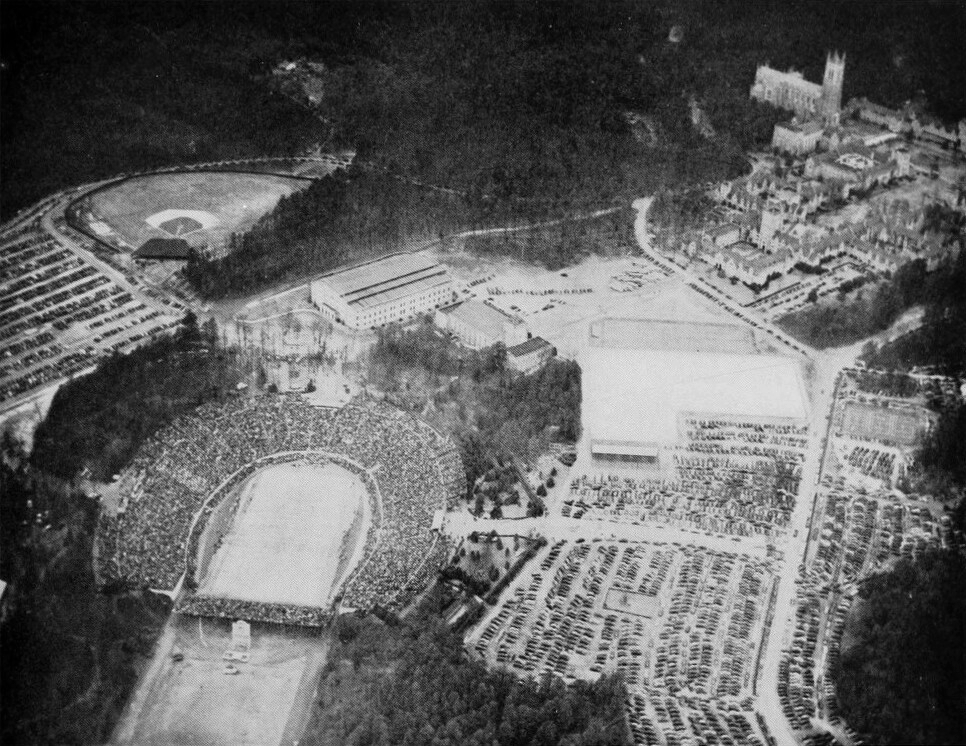
- A packed Duke Stadium from above
Duke Blue Devils	Oregon State Beavers
(9–0)	(7–2)
SoCon	PCC
16	20
Head coach: Wallace Wade	Head coach: Lon Stiner
AP 2	AP 12
	1	2	3	4	Total
Duke	0	7	7	2	16
Oregon State	7	0	13	0	20
- Date: January 1, 1942
- Season: 1941
- Stadium: Duke Stadium
- Location: Durham, North Carolina
- MVP: Donald Durdan, Oregon State
- Favorite: Duke by 14
- Referee: Lee Eisan (Pacific Coast; split crew: Pacific Coast, Southern) (original referee from Pacific Coast Conference, T.M. Fitzpatrick, was protested by Oregon State athletic director Percy Locey)
- Attendance: 56,000 (estimated)

The 1942 Rose Bowl was a college football bowl game played on Thursday, January 1, 1942. It was the 28th edition of the Rose Bowl Game. Originally scheduled for the Rose Bowl in Pasadena, California, it was moved to Durham, North Carolina, due to fears about an attack by the Japanese on the West Coast of the United States following the attack on Pearl Harbor on December 7, 1941. The federal government prohibited large public gatherings on the West Coast for the duration of World War II; the first significant canceled event was the Rose Bowl Game scheduled for New Year's Day, 1942.

The Oregon State Beavers of the Pacific Coast Conference (PCC) defeated the host Duke Blue Devils of the Southern Conference 20–16 in Duke Stadium (now Wallace Wade Stadium) on the Duke University campus. Donald Durdan of Oregon State was named the Player of the Game when the award was created in 1953 and selections were made retroactively.

The 1942 game was the only Rose Bowl played outside of Pasadena until the 2021 Rose Bowl, which was moved to AT&T Stadium in Arlington, Texas due to restrictions in California during the COVID-19 pandemic that prohibited any spectators in the stands. Rose Bowl officials moved the game to Texas due to fewer restrictions there.

== Teams ==
=== Oregon State ===
In 1941, the Beavers football team won the Pacific Coast Conference and a berth in their first Rose Bowl. In 1940, Oregon State had finished 5–3–1 and third in the PCC, the Beavers' third consecutive third-place finish. They opened in 1941 with a last minute 13–7 loss at USC. A 9–6 win over Washington set OSC on the path to the conference championship. The Beavers next played the defending national champion and #2 Stanford Indians in California. The Indians were nicknamed the Wow Boys, because they implemented the seldom-used T-formation, forerunner to the modern football offense. Oregon State shut out Stanford, 10–0, snapping the Indians 13-game winning streak, but were shut out against eventual runner-up Washington State 7–0.

The Beavers then shut out Idaho, UCLA, California, and Montana in consecutive weekends, outscoring the four a combined 85–0. The regular season finale was the Civil War at rival Oregon, which had the Rose Bowl on the line for the Beavers, and a possible five-way tie for first place if the Oregon Ducks won; all five teams would have three losses. Oregon State would have the most conference wins and also the best overall record. The argument was moot as Oregon State defeated Oregon and Stanford lost at Cal, leaving the Beavers with two conference losses. The rest of the PCC had four teams with three losses and five teams with four conference losses. Oregon State compiled the 7–2 record despite only scoring 20 points twice, against Idaho and Montana. The Beavers' defense only gave up 33 points all year, less than four points per game. Oregon State was led by Lon Stiner; at age 38, he became the youngest head coach in Rose Bowl history.

=== Duke ===
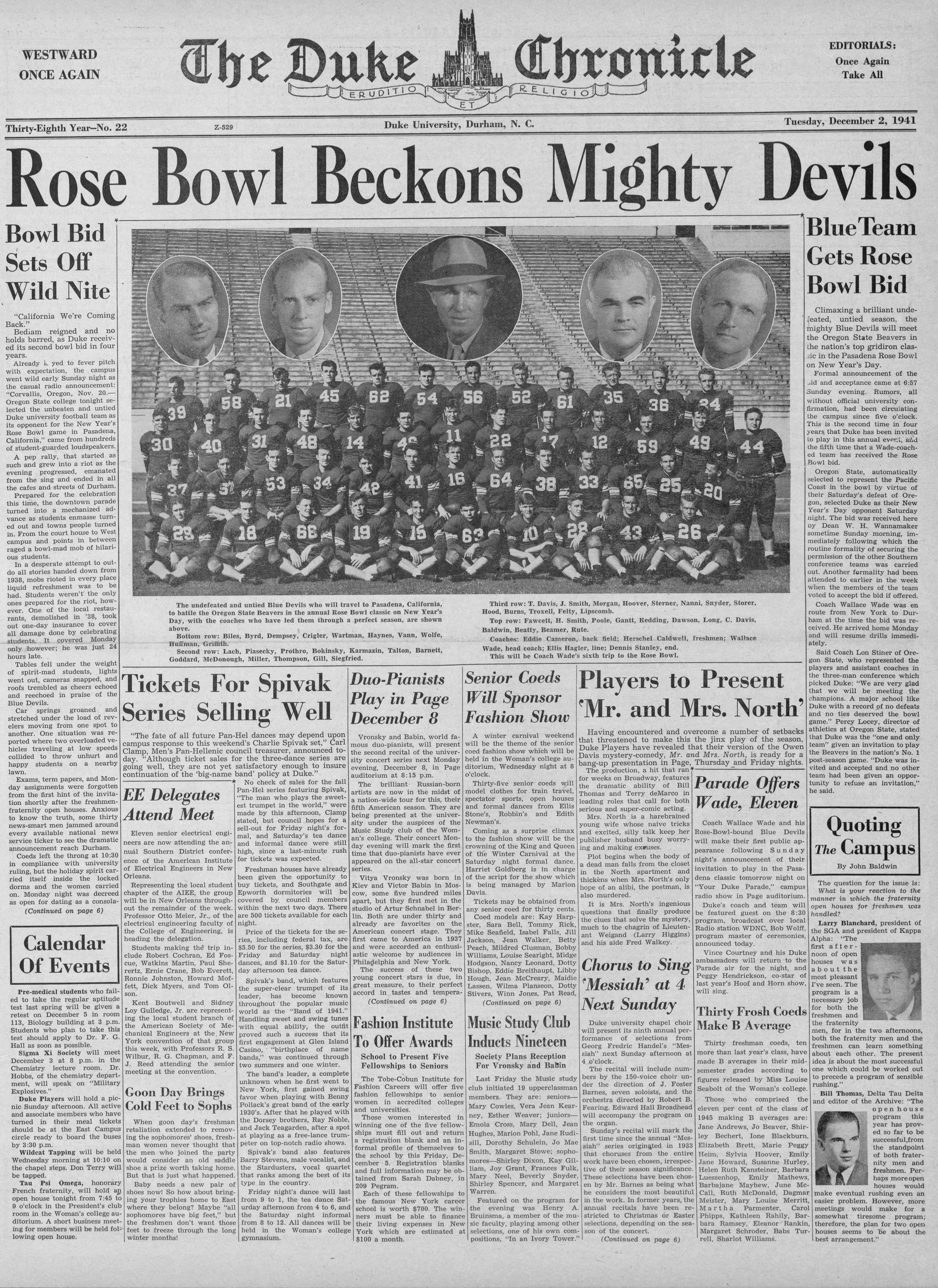
Duke's Rose Bowl bid announced in the university's student newspaper

Pacific Coast champion Oregon State was responsible for selecting and inviting the opposing team. Top-ranked Minnesota was the first choice, but the Western Conference (today's Big Ten Conference) did not permit their teams to play in bowl games until the 1946 agreement between the Big Nine and PCC. Duke was a logical second choice, but Coach Wallace Wade had rubbed a lot of Californians the wrong way due to his antics following his 7–3 loss in the 1939 Rose Bowl. The southern California media championed Missouri or Fordham. Oregon State responded by inviting Fordham, who they had beaten in their 1933 Ironmen year. Unknown to Oregon State, both Fordham and Missouri had received take-it-or-leave-it offers from the Sugar Bowl before their invite to the Rose Bowl, and each had accepted the offer. Unable to invite their three first choices, the Beavers settled on second-ranked and undefeated Duke, much to the chagrin of Southern California, which was announced on December 1, 1941. Duke's defense had not allowed more than 14 points all year. The Blue Devils were averaging a 30-point victory every time they took the field. In each game, the Blue Devils won by at least 13 points. The Blue Devils were on an 11-game winning streak, having gone 24–4 (.857) since their 1939 Rose Bowl defeat.

== Venue change to Durham, North Carolina ==
With the United States' entry into World War II following the Pearl Harbor attack on December 7, 1941, there was concern about a Japanese attack on the West Coast of the United States. Much discussion focused on the possibility of an attack where any crowds might gather. The Rose Parade and its estimated one million spectators, as well as the Rose Bowl with 90,000 spectators, were presumed to be ideal targets for the Japanese. On December 14, Lieutenant General John L. DeWitt, commander of the Western Defense Command, recommended that the Rose Parade and Rose Bowl festivities be canceled. By December 15, the Tournament of Roses committee decided to cancel the parade and game. Soon afterward, the government banned all large gatherings on the West Coast. This ruled out Bell Field, Oregon State's on-campus venue, as an alternative site for the game.

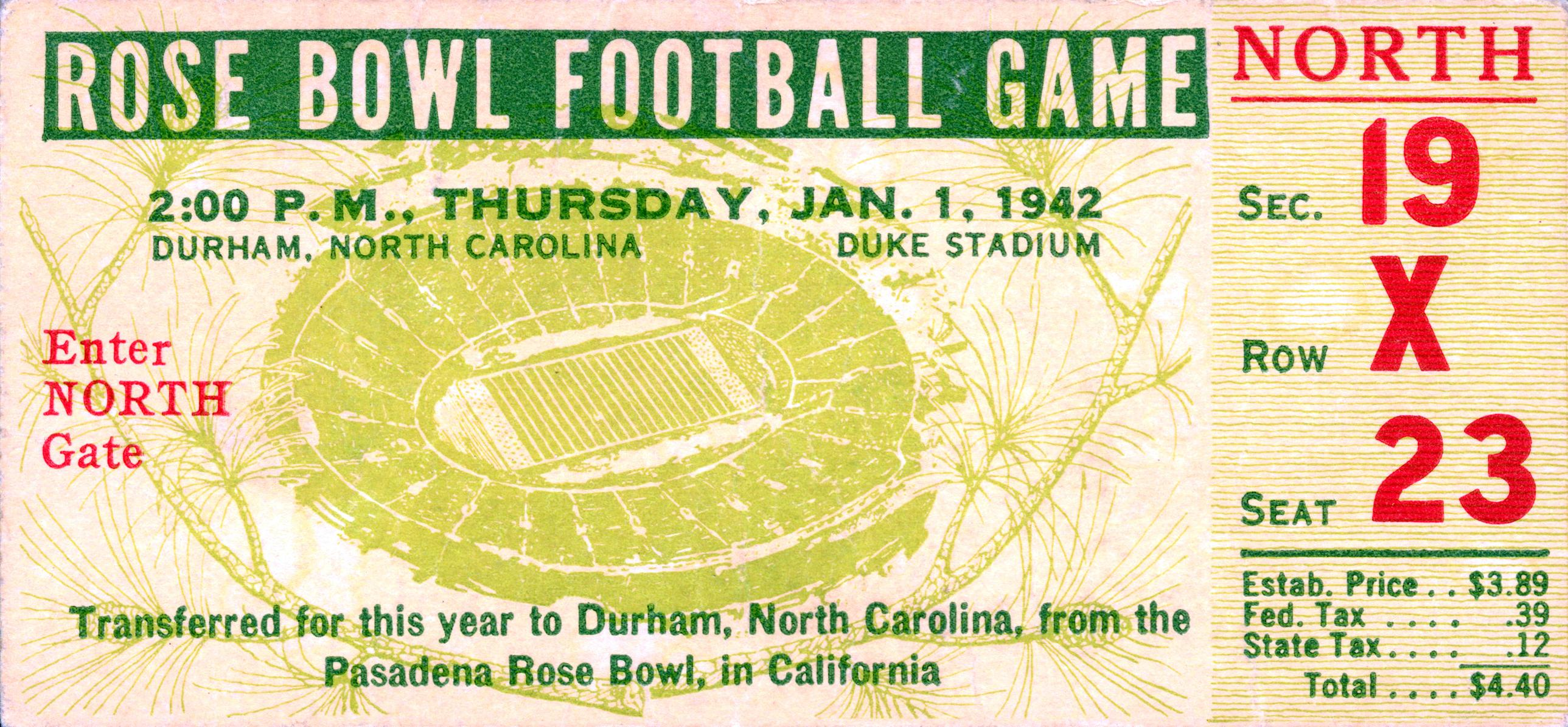
A ticket for the relocated game

On December 16, Duke University invited the game and Oregon State to Duke's home stadium in Durham, North Carolina.

At the time, Duke Stadium was the second-largest in the South but its seating capacity was just 35,000. In order to accommodate the larger crowd expected for the Rose Bowl, bleachers were brought in from the University of North Carolina at Chapel Hill's Kenan Stadium and North Carolina State University's Riddick Stadium to seat an additional 20,000 people. All 56,000 tickets sold out to the game in three days. Bing Crosby reportedly bought 271 tickets. It is unclear whether Crosby attended the game. Although Duke generally reserved a small segregated block of tickets for African-Americans, Duke initially decided to not allow African-Americans to attend. After an article in Durham's African-American newspaper, the Carolina Times, claimed that Duke would sell tickets to Japanese-Americans but not African-Americans, Duke reversed its decision and, despite the game already having officially sold out, released 140 tickets to African-American fans.

Oregon State's Beaver Express train left Corvallis with 31 players on December 19, just three days after Duke University invited Oregon State. Standing on the platform in Corvallis was Chiaki "Jack" Yoshihara. Yoshihara had immigrated to the United States of America at the age of three on the last ship allowed into the United States before the United States put a moratorium on Japanese immigration. By executive order, no Japanese-Americans were permitted to go more than 35 miles (56 km) from their homes. Multiple FBI agents informed Oregon State coach, Lon Stiner that no exception would be made for Yoshihara. Teammates, students, the acting Oregon State president, and the campus ROTC commandant protested the decision to no avail. Yoshihara, the Beavers' 32nd player, watched the Beaver Express leave Corvallis from the platform without him on it.

In Omaha, Nebraska, members of the University of Nebraska's N Club gave Stiner a good luck horseshoe. Three days after leaving Corvallis, the Beaver Express arrived in Chicago on December 22. The University of Chicago had dropped its football program after the 1939 season, so Oregon State used their Stagg Field. The train with the Beavers' equipment and uniforms did not arrive by practice time, so Oregon State players wore maroon warmups borrowed from the University of Chicago during kicking and passing drills. The equipment and uniform train arrived just in time for Martin Chaves, Bob Dethman, Donald Durdan, and Joe Day to dress in full pads for press pictures.

Oregon State left Chicago on December 22, and on the way to Durham, they stopped in Washington, D.C. for practice at Griffith Stadium, home of the Washington Redskins and Senators, and a tour of the nation's capital. The Beaver Express finally arrived in Durham on December 24, five days after leaving Corvallis.

To simulate Oregon State, Duke practiced against what Brian Curtis of Sports Illustrated later called "the most talented scout team in the country." It included Duke graduate George McAfee of the Chicago Bears to simulate Oregon State's Donald Durdan, as well as Duke graduate Jap Davis and North Carolina State senior Dick Watts.

On New Year's Day in Pasadena, the Rose Bowl Court and Queen, all clad in regular street clothes, drove down a deserted Colorado Boulevard, and later to a reception at the Huntington Hotel.

== Game summary ==
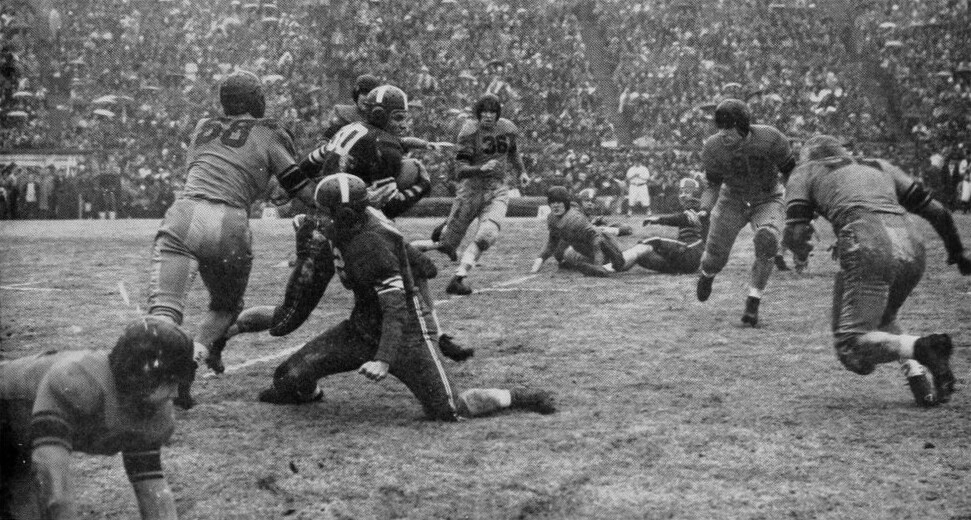
Duke halfback Tom Davis drives forward

Duke was expected to win by more than two touchdowns and went off as a 4–1 favorite. Some wondered why Oregon State would even make the trip. Before the game, the NBC announcer who called the game, Bill Stern, asserted that the Blue Devils could beat the Beavers by throwing 11 helmets on the field. The comment was heard by members of the Oregon State team at the hotel. After the game, George Zellick told reporters that the team was "hopped up" to win the game based on Stern's comment. The weather, also, seemed to favor the visitors. One Duke player claimed that there was more rain than he had ever seen. The Beavers' Gene Gray, looking up at the same sky, described the weather as "misty." The temperature was a hair over 40 °F (4 °C) at kickoff. The referee that was supposed to handle the opening coin flip was Lee Eisan. Eisan was the second-string quarterback for the 1928 California Golden Bears, who lost the Rose Bowl 7–8 to Georgia Tech after Roy "Wrong Way" Riegels ran 69 yards the wrong direction to set up the game-winning Georgia Tech safety. Eisan made a less often talked about blunder. In the third quarter, trailing 8–0, California ran an end around pass on fourth down. The end around sucked all of the Georgia Tech defenders in. Eisan used the misdirection to get behind the defenders and might have scored a touchdown but fell down and failed to make the catch. Eisan could not find a silver dollar in North Carolina, so he borrowed a 50-cent piece from Oregon State's Martin Chaves. The Blue Devils won the toss and elected to receive. Before kickoff, there was a moment of silence to honor those lost at Pearl Harbor 25 days before.

Oregon State's Norman Peters kicked the opening kickoff. Duke's Tommy Davis collected the ball at his own five-yard line. He was crushed by the Beavers' Lloyd Wickett and two other Beavers and fumbled. Oregon State recovered inside the Blue Devil 30. The Duke defense would hold. The teams traded possession most of the first quarter. On third-and-six at the Blue Devil 15, Oregon State's Donald Durdan went back to pass. With no receiver open, he pump faked and took off to his right with nothing in front of him but the end zone to put the Beavers up 7–0. In the second quarter, Duke would tie the score at seven with a four-yard run on a reverse by Steve Lach. Oregon State's ensuing drive resulted in an interception at the 46, which was returned to the Beaver 27. On third-and-nine, the Blue Devils had a wide open receiver behind the Beaver defense, but quarterback Tommy Prothro's pass was just beyond the receiver's outstretched fingertips and fell incomplete. Duke ultimately turned the ball over on downs. The Blue Devils would threaten again late in the first half after an Oregon State fumble gave Duke a first down at the Beaver 32. Two plays later, though, the Oregon State defense sacked Prothro, forcing a fumble which was recovered by the Beavers. As the half was coming to a close, Duke drove to the Oregon State 42. Two Prothro passes were dropped by Blue Devil receivers, but a third was caught at the Beaver 10 and advanced to the 5. However, Duke was unable to get a subsequent play off before halftime, and the teams entered the locker rooms tied 7–7.

The head coach for Oregon State, Lon Stiner, gave an impassioned halftime speech, which was interrupted by an inebriated fan looking to urinate in the Beaver locker room.

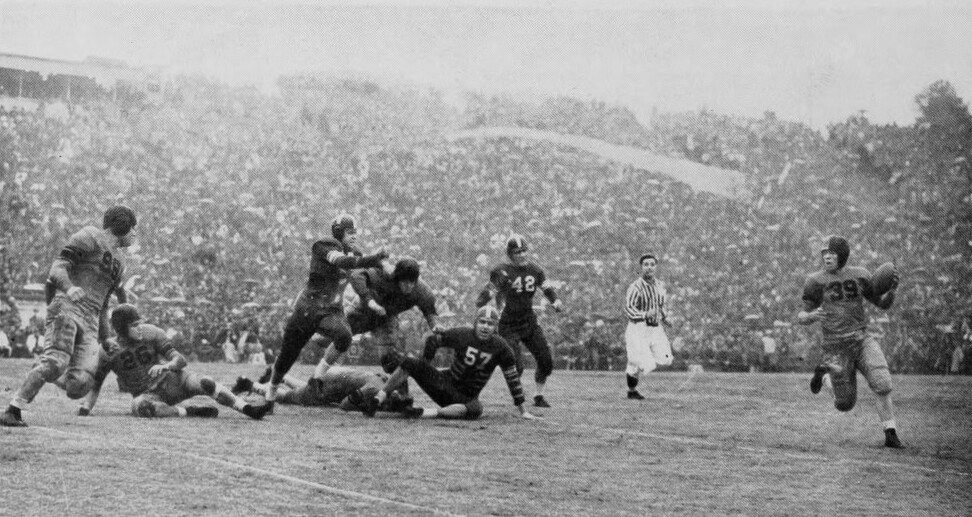
Oregon State's Don Durdan looking for a receiver

Oregon State took the second half kickoff. After a first down, the Beavers punted. Duke drove to the Beaver 28. On first down, the Blue Devils ran a double reverse and lost 12 yards. After an incomplete pass, the Oregon State defense forced another sack of Duke quarterback Prothro, which ended the threat. The Duke punt rolled out of bounds at the 15. The Beavers drove 73 yards to the Blue Devil 12 before getting pushed back to the Duke 15. Oregon State's 33-yard field goal attempt was no good. The Beavers' defense pushed the Blue Devils back to their own nine. On third down, Duke quick kicked, and the Beavers started their next drive at their own 46. The defenses, which played brilliantly for most of the game let down for the subsequent three-drive stretch. Oregon State retook the lead when Zellick scored on a 31-yard pass from Bob Dethman, set up by a 24-yard Gene Gray run. Duke would respond on the very next drive, getting 39 yards on a Lach reverse around left end before scoring on a one-yard run by Winston Siegfried three plays later. The Blue Devils' coach, Wallace Wade, who had won the 1926 Rose Bowl while at Alabama after a comeback against Washington, remarked to an assistant that, "It looks like 1926 all over again." 1942 would play out differently than 1926. In the following drive, Bob Dethman found streaking reserve halfback, Gene Gray, on a 33-yard pass. The Duke safety would just miss making a play on the ball. Gray faked inside and went outside, which confused Moffatt Storer, the Blue Devil cornerback, so badly that he fell down. The Duke safety on the far side of the field took a good angle, but Gray was simply too fast and outran the safety the final 35 yards into the end zone. The 68-yard pass play was the longest in Rose Bowl history and would remain the longest pass play for more than 20 years. The extra point would be blocked, leaving the door open for a Duke comeback. The 20 points that Oregon State scored were the most scored on the Blue Devils since 1930, they year before Wade became head football coach. It was the most points scored against a Wade-coached team since 1928.

The 14 points that Duke scored were the most that the Oregon State's defense had given up all year. The Beaver defense seemed resolved to make sure the 20-points the offense had put up would stand up. Duke's offense would cross into Beaver territory three times in the fourth-quarter, but the Beavers would not break, intercepting Prothro twice and shutting out the Duke offense the rest of the way. After a Duke punt went out of bounds at the Oregon State three, the Beavers opted to quick kick. However, Durden mishandled the snap. Rather than attempting the punt, Durden tried to advance the ball out of the end zone, but Mike Karmazin caught Durden before Durden was able to do so for a safety. The Blue Devils ensuing drive ended on a fumble at the Beaver 29. What appeared to be a great Oregon State return was nullified by an inadvertent whistle. Duke's last drive began on its own 26. After a 28-yard completion that gave the Blue Devils a first down at the Beaver 46, Prothro hurled two passes toward the Beaver end zone, but both were broken up by Oregon State defenders, one inside the Beaver 10. On the final play of the game, the Beavers' Dethman (who had thrown two touchdown passes as OSU's quarterback) came up with a game-saving interception on defense, ending Prothro's and Duke's hopes of a comeback. The Beavers won 20–16.

=== Scoring ===
==== First quarter ====
- OSC – Donald Durdan 15-yard run (Simas kick) 7:26 7–0 OSC

==== Second quarter ====
- DUKE – Steve Lach 4-yard run (Gantt kick) 3:32 7–7 tie

==== Third quarter ====
- OSC – George Zellick 31-yard pass from Bob Dethman (Simas kick) 11:03 14–7 OSC
- DUKE – Winston Siegfried 1-yard run (Gantt kick) 6:15 14–14 tie
- OSC – Gene Gray 68-yard pass from Bob Dethman (kick failed) 0:25 20–14 OSC

==== Fourth quarter ====
- DUKE – Safety, Donald Durdan tackled in the end zone by Mike Karmazin 8:34 20–16 OSC

== Aftermath ==
Donald Durdan, who showed his all-around skill by rushing for 54 yards and a touchdown, passing, and punting, was named the game's most valuable player. Bob Dethman also distinguished himself by throwing for two touchdowns and coming up with the interception that ended the game. The 1942 Rose Bowl remains the only Beavers' Rose Bowl victory. It also remains the only time the two programs have played each other.

Had Duke not appeared in the 1939 game, they would've been the only invitee to the Rose Bowl game to have never played in Pasadena.

Although many others argue that Columbia's 1934 victory over Stanford was bigger, Sid Feder of the Associated Press labeled it the biggest upset in the Rose Bowl's early history.

Navy's head coach Major Swede Larson attended the game. At halftime, he was heard to remark that Oregon State was the hardest-hitting team that Duke had played all year.

Referee Lee Eisan, who borrowed a 50-cent piece from Oregon State's Martin Chaves to conduct the coin flip, made it back to Berkeley, California with Chaves' 50-cent piece in hand, upset that he had failed to return the coin.

The East–West Shrine Game has been played after every college football season since 1925. The game started in San Francisco, California and prior to 2006, would be played in the Bay Area every year, except for two years. The first year outside of the Bay Area was 1942. As a result of the prohibition against playing football in West Coast stadiums, the East–West Shrine Game was moved to New Orleans, Louisiana. The West's coach was Washington State's Billy Sewell. A little more than two months prior, Sewell and the Cougars had dealt the Beavers the Beavers' largest loss of the year, a 7–0 decision in Pullman, Washington. The Beaver Express left Durham and stopped in New Orleans for the game on January 3, 1942. The game ended in a 6–6 tie. Many were concerned that the East–West Shrine Game would be the last football game "in a generation." On the way back to Corvallis, Oregon State was able to visit the Rose Bowl in Pasadena, California. By the time the Beaver Express arrived home, the team had traveled 7,384 miles, through 24 states.

After the 1942 Allied victory in the Battle of Midway and the end of the Japanese offensives in the Pacific Theater during June 1942, it was deemed that the West Coast was no longer vulnerable to attack, and the Rose Bowl game continued on in the Rose Bowl Stadium.

Most of the players would don military uniforms during 1942. Wallace Wade enlisted after the game ended and encouraged his players to follow suit. Of the 31 players on the Beaver Express, 29 would serve in World War II. Both teams lost halfbacks in the Pacific Theater in 1942, Walter Griffith of Duke and Everett Smith of Oregon State. Al Hoover of Duke lost his life on Peleliu in 1944 after diving on a grenade to save his fellow soldiers. The Blue Devils' Bob Nanni was killed at Iwo Jima.

Jack Yoshihara listened to the game on NBC radio. He tried to enlist but was repeatedly denied. Once Japanese-American internment camps began popping up in the Western United States, he sold his prized 1941 Chevrolet. He spent most of 1942 in an internment camp in Idaho.

Tommy Prothro, who was later the head coach of Oregon State and UCLA in successive Rose Bowls, played quarterback for the Blue Devils.

Prothro's backup, Charlie Haynes, and Oregon State left guard, Frank Parker (himself the starting quarterback on the 1940 Beaver team), were rifle platoon leaders in different companies, sailing from Africa to Italy in 1944, when the two recognized each other. In the fall, Parker found Haynes with a fist-sized wound in his chest during the Arno Valley Campaign. Haynes had been injured 17 hours before and believed that he was going to die. Parker saved Haynes' life by carrying him on his back to an abandoned farmhouse for medical attention.

In 1945, during the Battle of the Bulge, Oregon State right tackle, Stan Czech, shared some coffee and food with a fellow soldier who had not eaten in two days. Czech soon recognized the soldier as Duke coach, Wallace Wade. Czech was taken prisoner days later and interned at OFLAG XIII-B. He managed to escape but was recaptured the next day and interned at a prison deeper inside Germany. By the time he was freed, after nearly six months in captivity, Czech had lost 50 pounds (23 kg).

Duke Stadium, the site of the game, was later named Wallace Wade Stadium in honor of the Duke coach.

Oregon State's Gene Gray flew more than 30 bombing missions over Germany and continued to serve after the war. In 1948, his plane crashed after a flameout on takeoff in the jungles of Panama. He later likened his body to burnt steak. He had severe burns over most of his body and both his arms had to be amputated. Gray, whose arms hauled in the touchdown catch which proved the deciding margin, wound up with no arms at all.

The last surviving player who played in the game was Jim Smith, who played for Duke. Smith died in 2019 at age 98.

The last surviving player was Oregon State reserve halfback Andy Landforce, who died in 2023 at age 105. Landforce only had three carries in 1941 and did not play in the 1942 Rose Bowl game. Instead, Landforce worked as a spotter for Bill Stern as a part of Stern's national radio broadcast of the game.
