= Quentin Greenough =

American football player (1919–2005)

Biographical details
- Born: January 13, 1919; Porterville, California, U.S.
- Died: August 1, 2005 (aged 86); Corvallis, Oregon, U.S.
- Education: Oregon State

Playing career
- 1940–41: Oregon State
- Position: Center

Coaching career (HC unless noted)
- 1946–1948: Oregon State (assistant)

Accomplishments and honors

Awards
- Oregon Sports Hall of Fame (1981); Oregon State University Hall of Fame (1991)
- Military career
- Spouse: Rae Ardis DeMoss
- Allegiance: United States
- Branch: US Coast Guard
- Other work: Coach, business owner

Quentin Carl Greenough (January 13, 1919 – August 1, 2005) was an American football player.

== Football career ==
Greenough was born in Porterville, California and later moved to San Gabriel, California. He attended Alhambra High School, then enrolled at Oregon State College (later Oregon State University) where he became the starting center. In the 1941 season, he was credited with leading Oregon State's 10–0 defensive effort against Stanford, which behind its new T-formation had not lost a game since 1939. Greenough was chosen as an All-American, helping the Beavers to a Pacific Coast Conference championship and berth in the 1942 Rose Bowl. With Greenough anchoring the offensive line, the underdog Beavers won their first (and so far, only) Rose Bowl, upsetting Duke 20–16.

He later played in the 1944 East-West Shrine Game, and after his college career, served in the United States Coast Guard and played on the Coast Guard's football team.

== After football ==
When his playing career ended, Greenough became an assistant football coach under Beavers head coach Lon Stiner. He married Rae Ardis DeMoss, becoming the brother-in-law of his Rose Bowl teammate Don Durdan, who was married to another DeMoss sister. (Another sister was Oregon golf champion Grace DeMoss.) Greenough later set up his own general contractor business in Corvallis, Oregon.

Greenough was named to the Oregon Sports Hall of Fame in 1981 and the Oregon State University Hall of Fame in 1991. He died in Corvallis in 2005.
