= 1941 Oregon State Beavers football team =

American college football season

1941 Oregon State Beavers football

PCC champion Rose Bowl champion

Rose Bowl, W 20–16 vs. Duke
- Conference: Pacific Coast Conference

Ranking
- AP: No. 12
- Record: 8–2 (7–2 PCC)
- Head coach: Lon Stiner (9th season)
- Captains: Martin Chaves; Stan Czech; Bob Dethman; Quentin Greenough; Lew Hammers; George Peters; Norm Peter
- Home stadium: Bell Field

1941 Pacific Coast Conference football standings
	Conf.					Overall
Team	W		L		T	W		L		T
No. 12 Oregon State $	7	–	2	–	0	8	–	2	–	0
Washington	5	–	3	–	0	5	–	4	–	0
No. 19 Washington State	5	–	3	–	0	6	–	4	–	0
Stanford	4	–	3	–	0	6	–	3	–	0
Oregon	4	–	4	–	0	5	–	5	–	0
UCLA	3	–	4	–	1	5	–	5	–	1
California	3	–	4	–	0	4	–	5	–	0
USC	2	–	4	–	1	2	–	6	–	1
Montana	1	–	3	–	0	6	–	3	–	0
Idaho	0	–	4	–	0	4	–	5	–	0
$ – Conference champion; Rankings from AP Poll

The 1941 Oregon State Beavers football team represented Oregon State College in the 1941 college football season. The team was led by head coach Lon Stiner.

Home games were played at Bell Field in Corvallis, Oregon and Multnomah Stadium in Portland.

The Beavers ended this season with eight wins and two losses. They were the Pacific Coast Conference champions and won the 1942 Rose Bowl over Duke. Because of the Japanese attack on Pearl Harbor, the Rose Bowl was held in Durham, North Carolina. Oregon State thus became the only team to win a Rose Bowl outside Pasadena, California.

The team captains were Martin Chaves, Stan Czech, Bob Dethman, Quentin Greenough, Lew Hammers, George Peters, and Norm Peters.

The Beavers scored 143 points and allowed 49 points.

Oregon State was ranked at No. 25 (out of 681 teams) in the final rankings under the Litkenhous Difference by Score System for 1941 and No. 16 according to the Azziratem System favored by Illustrated Football Annual magazine.

== Schedule ==
Date	Opponent	Rank	Site	Result	Attendance	Source
September 27	at USC		Los Angeles Memorial Coliseum; Los Angeles, CA	L 7–13	50,000	
October 4	vs. Washington		Multnomah Stadium; Portland, OR	W 9–6	15,000	
October 11	Stanford		Bell Field; Corvallis, OR	W 10–0	22,000	
October 25	at Washington State	No. 18	Rogers Field; Pullman, WA	L 0–7	10,000	
November 1	Idaho	No. 25	Bell Field; Corvallis, OR	W 33–0	5,000	
November 8	UCLA^{†}		Bell Field; Corvallis, OR	W 19–0	10,000	
November 15	at California		California Memorial Stadium; Berkeley, CA	W 6–0	20,000	
November 22	vs. Montana	No. 16	Multnomah Stadium; Portland, OR	W 27–0	4,000	
November 29	at Oregon	No. 17	Hayward Field; Eugene, OR (rivalry)	W 12–7	20,500	
January 1	at No. 2 Duke*	No. 12	Duke Stadium; Durham, NC (Rose Bowl)	W 20–16	56,000	
*Non-conference game; ^{†}Homecoming; Rankings from AP Poll released prior to the game; Source:

== Rankings ==
Ranking movements Legend: ██ Increase in ranking ██ Decrease in ranking — = Not ranked
	Week							
Poll	1	2	3	4	5	6	7	Final
AP	16	18	—	—	—	16	17	12

== Game summaries ==
=== Before the season ===
In 1940, Oregon State finished third behind Stanford and Washington. The Indians became the first major college team to implement the "T" formation and subsequently went a perfect 10–0, winning the Poling National Championship. Billingsly and Helms each also subsequently awarded Stanford the National Championship. The Beavers' third-place finish in 1940 was Oregon State's third consecutive third-place finish in the Pacific Coast Conference. Nevertheless, the Beavers lost 11 lettermen and were almost unanimously picked to finish in the lower half of the Pacific Coast Conference. California, Stanford, and Washington were picked to finish at the top of the Pacific Coast Conference.

Oregon State's returning lettermen Bud English and Bob Rambo each enlisted in the off-season. It was reported that English probably would have been all-conference had he not enlisted. Frank Chase had a summer job at a defense plant. He was told that he probably would be drafted, if he left, so he stayed at his job rather than attempting to rejoin the team in 1941. Galen Thomas, similarly was told that he would likely be drafted, if he attempted to rejoin the team in 1941, so he enlisted in a civilian pilot program in 1941. Gene Gray was drafted but sought and was awarded a deferment, allowing him to play the 1941 season. One of the other late additions to the team was Ken Wilson. Wilson was suspended the previous season by the Pacific Coast Conference but was reinstated before the season began. Oregon State's starting quarterback, Frank Parker, returned in 1941. However, Lon Stiner moved Parker to guard.

Leland Gustafson injured his knee shortly before the season began and was out until the Stanford game.

The first three games on Oregon State's schedule in 1941 were a road game at Southern California, versus Washington in Portland, Oregon, and a home game against Stanford. On the Beavers' front-loaded schedule, one columnist wrote that "It would be a miracle if Oregon State wins one of its first three games."

=== USC ===
	1	2	3	4	Total
Beavers	7	0	0	0	7
Trojans	0	7	0	6	13

Southern California's head coach from 1925 to 1940 was Howard Jones. Jones unexpectedly died of a heart attack on July 27, 1941, at the age of 55, so J.M. "Sam" Barry, Southern California's basketball and baseball coach, took over the team in 1941. The Trojans were two years removed from winning consecutive Rose Bowls against teams that were previously unbeaten, untied, and unscored upon (Duke in 1939 and Tennessee in 1940). The Beavers were the first team to play the Trojans with Barry as head coach. Barry kept his practices secret, so the Beaver coaching staff went into the game without any information about what the Trojan offensive and defensive strategies.

Southern California's Bob Robertson fumbled a punt in the first quarter at the Trojan four. Oregon State's Joe Day fumbled on the subsequent drive. However, after a poor punt, the Beavers took over at the Trojan 27. Don Durdan threw a five-yard pass to Bob Dethman. Dethman immediately reciprocated, throwing a 22-yard pass to Durdan for a touchdown less than five minutes into the game. Warren Simas kicked the extra point for a 7–0 lead. Oregon State intercepted a Robertson pass inside the Beaver five to preserve the 7-0 first quarter lead. In the second quarter, Southern California partially blocked an Oregon State punt. With less than five minutes left in the first half, Robertson threw a 22-yard touchdown pass to Doug Essick to tie the game at seven. Oregon State responded, driving down to the Trojan 15, but the Beavers' 32-yard field goal was blocked.

Southern California had the best drive of the third quarter but was stopped short on fourth down. In the fourth quarter, Oregon State twice drove deep into Trojan territory. On Oregon State's best second half drive, the Beavers drove down to Southern California's three before the Trojans stopped the Beavers on fourth-and-goal. Aided by a personal foul, the Trojans drove for a touchdown on a five-yard pass from Ray Woods to Essick a foot from the back of the end zone with 13 seconds left to go up 13–7. A Beaver lineman fumbled the following Trojan kickoff and a Southern Californian recovered the fumble to clinch a Trojan victory. In the loss, the Beavers had 21 first downs to the Trojans' 10, 194 passing yards to the Trojans' 86, 244 total yards to the Trojans' 230.

The game has been hailed as the "crowning glory" of Southern California's 1941 campaign. Robertson was selected seventh overall in the 1942 NFL Draft. Center Bob deLauer was selected 82nd overall.

=== Washington ===
	1	2	3	4	Total
Huskies	0	0	0	6	6
Beavers	0	7	0	2	9

Washington returned to Oregon to play Oregon State for the first time since 1923. The Huskies would not agree to play south of Portland until 1966, limiting the Beavers' homefield advantage. In 1940, the Huskies defeated the Beavers 19–0, Oregon State's largest road loss since 1936. The Beavers had not won a game against the Huskies in the State of Oregon in 20 years.

In the second quarter, Oregon State took the ball after a touchback. On the first play, the Beavers ran a reverse to Don Durdan. Durdan ran for 20 yards, juked four Husky defenders, and then ran the final 60 yards for a touchdown. Second-string quarterback, Warren Simas, kicked an extra point for a 7–0 lead with 12:15 left in the first half. At the time, the 80-yard Durdan run was the longest offensive play in Oregon State history. On the last play of the first half on fourth down at their own 33 yard-line, the Beavers opted to punt. Durdan kicked a 47-yard punt. Washington's Ernie Steele broke into the open field. On his way to the end zone, he slowed to allow blocking protection to form. Steele's change-of-pace allowed Oregon State's Joe Day time to drag down Steele from behind at the Beaver 27 to save a potential Husky touchdown.

Washington's first threat of the second half ended on downs in the third quarter inside Oregon State's 35. In the fourth, the Huskies took over at the Beaver 48. Washington drove 45 yards on eight plays. On 2nd-and-goal, the Huskies' Neil Brooks went over left guard. Durdan tackled him one foot short of the end zone. Durdan hit Brooks so hard that Brooks had to be carried off of the field. Durdan, however, was also hurt and had to come off, as well. On the next play, Bob Erickson dove into the end zone for a touchdown to cut the lead to one. On the extra point attempt, Chiaki "Jack" Yoshihara almost blocked the extra point. In attempting to kick around the hard-charging Yoshihara, Washington's kicker, Elmer Berg, pushed the kick wide, preserving Oregon State's 7–6 lead with 6:44 left in the game. On a subsequent Beaver drive, Choc Shelton filled in for the injured Durdan and took his only punt of the game, pinning the Huskies at their own three with 2:30 left in the game. Washington called a pass play, but Erickson's pass fell incomplete in the end zone for an automatic safety, cementing a 9-6 Oregon State victory. The Huskies had nine first downs to the Beavers' five, but Oregon State outgained Washington 210–173. Durdan was the leading ground-gainer for both teams, amassing 106 yards on 10 carries. Oregon State finished 2/7 on pass plays with an interception. Washington finished 3/8 on pass plays with two interceptions. Most of the Huskies' yards and all of the Huskies' completions came on their long drives in the third and fourth quarters.

Even with the loss, Washington would go on to be ranked as high as #20. Steele was selected 81st overall in the 1942 NFL Draft. Washington's guard Ray Frankowski was selected 24th, end Earl Younglove was selected 43rd, and back Jack Stackpool was selected 83rd.

=== Stanford ===
	1	2	3	4	Total
Indians	0	0	0	0	0
Beavers	3	0	7	0	10

In 1940, Stanford hired Clark Shaughnessy. Shaughnessy implemented the "Model T" offense, a more-advanced version of the Chicago Bears' "Pro T" formation. The "Pro T" itself was rarely used at the time and never with Shaughnessy's modifications. The resulting Indian team was nicknamed the "Wow Boys." Stanford went a perfect 10–0, securing the national championship. The Indians beat the Beavers 28–14 in 1940, scoring more points on Oregon State's defense than any team in the past four years. Stanford's All-American quarterback, Frankie Albert, returned for his senior year and led the Pacific Coast Conference in passing and total yardage. The Indians fielded the best offense in the Pacific Coast Conference. Stanford entered on a 13-game winning streak, having defeated Oregon 19-15 and UCLA 33–0 to start the 1941 season. Don Durdan, who was injured in the Washington game, returned to play against the Indians. Leland Gustafson, who was injured before the season began, was cleared to play in his first game of the season. For the first time in 1941, the Beavers were at full strength. The game was a sellout, Oregon State sold 22,000 tickets for the 21,000-seat stadium. It was the highest-attended game ever in Corvallis. The game was played in a thunderstorm.

In the first quarter, Oregon State drove 58 yards with the big play being an 18-yard gain on a Don Durdan reverse. On fourth-and-five at the Stanford eight, Warren Simas kicked a 26-yard field goal to put Oregon State up 3-0 less than seven minutes into the game. The Indians breached the Beavers 25 yardline twice in the second, once in the third, and twice in the fourth quarters but failed to score each time. Stanford's first drive inside the 25 started at its own 18 at the end of the first quarter. The Indians drove to the Beaver 23 in the second quarter before a 15-yard penalty and a four-yard loss on a fumble pushed Stanford back. On 4th-and-25 at the Beaver 38, the Indians were forced to punt. With about a minute left in the half, Stanford's All-American quarterback Frankie Albert hit Fred Meyer on a 43-yard pass play to give Stanford a first down at Oregon State's 23. Albert appeared to complete another pass to Meyer at the one, but Meyer was out-of-bounds, which nullified the 22-yard gain. Albert's next pass was intercepted by Choc Shelton at the 10.

The Indians picked right up in the third quarter, driving 50 yards to the Beaver 20 before turning the ball over on downs. Later in the third quarter, Quentin Greenough set up an Oregon State drive by recovering a Stanford fumble at the Indian 14. Bob Dethman converted one fourth down on the short drive down to the Indian three. The three subsequent plays netted only one yard, but Dethman ran the remaining two for a touchdown on fourth-and-goal to put the Beavers up 10–0. In the fourth quarter, Oregon State intercepted an Albert pass and returned it to the Stanford nine. However, the Indians held at their own four. Stanford drove down to the Oregon State 18, but Dethman ended the threat with an interception at the Beaver eight. The Indians' final drive started inside the Beaver 30 after a fumble late in the game, but Stanford ran out of time, allowing Oregon State to escape with a 10–0 win. The game was hardfought. The Beavers' Greenough dislocated his fibula in the fourth quarter. The injury was so severe that he finished the game in the hospital. It was initially believed that it would take Greenough at least six weeks to recover. However, Greenough would rush back after missing only two games. George Zellick also was injured and would miss the next game, as well. Durdan injured his left hand and was not 100% until the UCLA game.

With Oregon State's win, the United Press named Lon Stiner the coach of the week.

The initial Associated Press rankings came out two days after the game, ranking the Beavers 16th, their highest ranking since starting 5–0 in 1939. The next week was a bye for Oregon State. The Beavers dropped two spots over the bye weekend. Stanford would be ranked as high as #6 on the season, even with the loss. Albert finished third in the Heisman balloting in 1941 and was selected 10th overall in the 1942 NFL Draft, 109 picks in front of Heisman Trophy winner, Bruce Smith. Meyer was selected 103rd. Stanford's halfback Pete Kmetovic was selected 3rd, and the Indians' center, Vic Lindskog was selected 13th.

=== Washington State ===
	1	2	3	4	Total
Beavers	0	0	0	0	0
Cougars	7	0	0	0	7

Quentin Greenough and George Zellick were injured and missed the game. The first quarter was played in a fog. Washington State's Billy Sewell led the nation in passing in 1940. However, unknown to Oregon State, Sewell had injured his throwing arm prior to the game. Without that information, the Beavers started the game with a five-man front to counter Sewell's passing threat. The Cougars won the coin toss and kicked. Oregon State's drive stalled, and Durdan punted out of bounds at the Washington State 14. The Cougars immediately drove 86 yards all on the ground for a touchdown and 7–0 lead on a four-yard run. In the second quarter, Washington State drove down to the eight, but George Peters ended the threat by intercepting a pass at the three-yard line. In the first five minutes of the fourth quarter, after an interception, the Beavers drove 30 yards down to the Cougar three, but Gene Gray was tackled short of the end zone on fourth down. Oregon State's final drive ended on a fourth down carry by Bob Dethman, which was stopped short of the line to gain.

The Cougars would win the next four to finish the season ranked #19. Sewell was selected 53rd overall in the 1942 NFL Draft.

=== Idaho ===
	1	2	3	4	Total
Vandals	0	0	0	0	0
Beavers	7	7	13	6	33

On Halloween night, there was a practice blackout in Corvallis in preparation for a potential invasion. Only emergency cars were allowed on the road past curfew. In the first quarter, Idaho stopped Oregon State at the Vandal 21. Later in the quarter after an Idaho punt, Oregon State put together two consecutive first downs for 22 yards down to the Vandal 37. From there, Joe Day went over left tackle and broke multiple tackles on a 37-yard touchdown run with four minutes left in the first quarter. Warren Simas kicked the extra point to put Oregon State up 7–0. Five minutes later, after Everett Smith pinned the Vandals at their own 13, Smith intercepted an Idaho pass at the Vandal 36 and returned it to the 28. Three plays netted two yards, but Gene Gray scored on a 26-yard run on a delayed fake reverse. Simas again kicked the extra point to put the Beavers up 14–0. Idaho racked up most of its yards on one 55-yard drive in the first half. The Vandals' drive ended on an incomplete fourth-and-seven pass at the Oregon State 11.

In the second half, all of the Beaver starters were substituted out. Backup Bill McInnis intercepted a Vandal pass at the Idaho 40 and returned it for a touchdown. Simas converted the extra point to put Oregon State up 21–0. Smith, who had started the second touchdown drive with an interception, scored the next touchdown. Simas missed his first extra point attempt of the season to leave the score 27–0. Jim Busch scored the Beavers' fifth touchdown for a 33–0 lead. Oregon State opted to try and pass for the extra point, but the pass fell incomplete. In the final minutes, the Vandals's Howard Manson threw a 40-yard pass to Jack Tewhey down to the Beaver two. Idaho received a timeout penalty, and the drive ended after an incomplete pass. Oregon State finished with 209 yards rushing to Idaho's 12. The Beavers finished with 255 yards, and the Vandals finished with 89 yards, the second-fewest yards that Oregon State had allowed up until that time (only behind the 1939 Beaver-Vandal game). Outside of the 55-yard first half drive and the 40-yard fourth quarter pass, the Beavers held the Vandals to -6 total yards. Idaho only recorded seven first downs, five through the air and two by penalty. The Vandals did not net a single rushing first down.

=== UCLA ===
	1	2	3	4	Total
Bruins	0	0	0	0	0
Beavers	6	6	7	0	19

Entering the game, Oregon State had never defeated UCLA in the State of Oregon. The game was homecoming for Oregon State. After the success of Stanford's "Model T" formation in 1940, the Bruins adopted the "Q-T" formation. Quentin Greenough returned to start his first game since the Stanford game. After the teams traded punts, Oregon State drove inside the UCLA 10 on a 25-yard Durdan run. Dethman subsequently fumbled, and Bob Waterfield recovered. The Beavers started their next drive on their 35 and drove 65 yards for a touchdown. On fourth down, Durdan threw a six-yard touchdown pass to Norm Peters with 3:20 left in the first quarter. Warren Simas' kicking woes continued with a second consecutive missed extra point. UCLA's Ted Forbes returned the kickoff 50 yards to the Oregon State 45. The Bruins put together three first downs down to the Beaver 12. Forbes ran for nine. Leo Cantor was stopped for no gain and then lost three. Waterfield's fourth-down pass fell incomplete for a turnover on downs. UCLA's defense held, but Forbes fumbled the punt, and Greenough, in his first game back in four weeks, recovered at the Oregon State 45. Durdan ran for 25 yards. Joe Day subsequently ran for 15 yards down to the Bruin two. On the subsequent set of downs, Day fumbled, but Durdan recovered the fumble for a touchdown. Simas missed his third consecutive extra point to keep the score 12-0 Beavers.

Early in the third quarter, Oregon State drove to the UCLA 15 but turned the ball over on downs. Two plays later, Durdan intercepted Waterfield's pass at the UCLA 23. Choc Shelton ran for a yard. On the next play, Durdan made a diving catch of a 22-yard Bob Dethman pass for a touchdown. Simas converted the extra point for a 19-0 Beaver lead. Soon afterward, the Bruins drove to the one-yard line. Al Solari was stopped short of the end zone, Waterfield's second-down pass fell incomplete, and two Cantor carries were also stopped short of the end zone for a turnover on downs. Oregon State had the best drive of the fourth quarter, but neither team dented the other team's 25 yard-line for the rest of the game. The Beavers had more than twice as many yards, outgaining the Bruins 385-190 yards. With the win, Oregon State jumped from eighth to third in the conference standings, remaining one game behind Stanford.

=== California ===
	1	2	3	4	Total
Beavers	0	0	6	0	6
Bears	0	0	0	0	0

California's star was Bob Reinhard, primarily a tackle, who also played fullback and punted. In the second quarter, a roughing penalty gave Oregon State the ball at the California 33. The Beavers drove 32 yards, but Choc Shelton fumbled into the end zone, and the Bears recovered, ending both teams' best scoring threat in the first half. In the third quarter, California drove 53 yards to the Oregon State four. The Beaver defense held three times, and the Bears missed their field goal attempt. Later in the third quarter, Reinhard could only manage an 11-yard punt, giving the Beavers the ball at the Bear 35. Joe Day ran for a first down at the 11. Day then ran for nine. Everett Smith ran the final two for a touchdown. Warren Simas missed the extra point, but Oregon State held on to win 6–0.

That day, Washington State defeated Stanford 14–13. The Indians' Albert missed a third quarter extra point for the final margin. With the win and the Indian loss, the Beavers moved to the top of the conference race. Reinhard was selected 34th overall in the 1942 NFL Draft.

=== Montana ===
	1	2	3	4	Total
Grizzlies	0	0	0	0	0
Beavers	6	7	7	7	27

The game was the first, last, and only time that Montana and Oregon State played in Portland, Oregon. The Oregon State game was the final scheduled game of the year for the Grizzlies. 10,000 fans were expected but, due to rain, only 6,000 showed up to watch. With 11:30 left in the first quarter, Dethman threw a 16-yard pass to Durdan, who ran the remaining 55 yards for a 71-yard touchdown pass. Oregon State failed to convert the extra point to leave the score 6–0. The touchdown pass was Oregon State's longest of 1941 and was the longest Oregon State pass-play between 1929 and 1947. At the end of the first half, the Beavers drove 54 yards with 45 of those yards being gained by backups Bill McInnis, Choc Shelton, and Everett Smith. After Montana stopped three carries inside of the five, McInnis powered in a touchdown from the one-foot line with one minute left in the half. Warren Simas kicked the extra point to put the Beavers up 13–0.

In the third quarter, after a poor punt gave the Oregon State the ball at the Montana 36, Day, Dethman, and Durdan combined to drive 36 yards with Day going over right tackle for the touchdown. Dethman kicked the extra point to put the Beavers up 20–0 with eight minutes left in the third quarter. In the fourth quarter, Oregon State's backups drove 64 yards for a final touchdown, Bob Libbee carrying twice for 15 yards and then three yards for the touchdown. Busch kicked the extra point to put the Beavers up 27–0. After the touchdown, the Grizzlies began to drive, netting three of its four first downs in the game. Montana drove down to the seven with less than a minute left before Parker ended the final Montana threat with an interception. Oregon State had 17 first downs to Montana's 4. The Beavers out-gained the Grizzlies 312 yards to 95. The 95 yards that Oregon state allowed were the third-fewest yards allowed by the Beavers in team history and second fewest in 1941. Montana was 7/21 passing for 58 yards. Oregon State was 6/9 for 120 yards. The two teams combined for five interceptions. The Beavers also wound up out-punting the Grizzlies.

On the Tuesday after the game, the first boats that would compose the Kidō Butai that would attack Pearl Harbor began leaving Japanese territory bound for Oahu. The following day, the six carriers of the Kidō Butai began leaving the Kuril Islands bound for Oahu as well.

=== Oregon ===
	1	2	3	4	Total
Beavers	0	0	6	6	12
Ducks	0	0	0	7	7

In 1940, Oregon defeated Oregon State 20–0. The 20-point loss was the Beavers' largest in the series between 1916 and 1955 and would remain the largest in the series in Corvallis, Oregon, until 1958, the final year of the Pacific Coast Conference. Parker Stadium replaced Bell Field as Oregon State's home field during the 1953 season, so it remained the largest loss in the series at Bell Field after the 1916 game.

The game was homecoming for Oregon. Oregon's Governor, Charles A. Sprague; Secretary of State and future Governor, Earl Snell; State Treasurer and future Governor, Leslie M. Scott; State Superintendent of Public Instruction, Rex Putnam; and President of the Senate, Dean Walker, were in attendance, as were the Presidents of Oregon, Donald Milton Erb, and Oregon State, Francois Archibald Gilfillan. The largest Civil War train was assembled. 18 cars carrying more than 800 fans rolled down from Portland to Eugene to watch the game. The 800 fans guaranteed that overflow seating was required. 20,500 fans packed into 20,000-seat Hayward Field. The Ducks' line outweighed the Beavers' line by an average of 16 pounds.

Dethman was named Oregon State's captain for the game. In the week before the game, Durdan had recovered from a bout with influenza. Glenn Byington, Boyd Clement, and George Peters had each spent three days in the infirmary.

Stiner finished his pregame speech by saying, "This one is frosting on the cake. If you win, you got it all." Someone on the outside of Oregon State's locker room said, "Two minutes, Mr. Stiner." Stiner jiggled the doorknob and indicated that the doors were locked. Stiner said, "They are not going to keep us in here!" He then proceeded to burst through the doors, knocking them off of their hinges.

The first half was played in a fog. With limited visibility, the first five drives ended in punts. Oregon's Bob Koch appeared to fumble at the Duck 31, but the play was blown dead. The drive ended in a punt, which Durdan returned to the Oregon State 35. Dethman almost scored a touchdown after hauling in a 23-yard pass from Durdan, but Dethman was tackled by the final Oregon defender at the Duck 37. After the drive petered out, Durdan pinned the Ducks at the Oregon eight. The Ducks lost five yards and punted out at the Oregon three. The Ducks' punter, Curt "Curly" Mecham shanked the punt, which only traveled 21 yards. Day ran for nine yards on two plays. On third-and-one, Dethman ran for seven yards and a first down to the eight on a reverse. Day's first two carries netted five yards. Durdan ran inside the two. On fourth-and-goal, Dethman was stopped short of the end zone inside the Duck one. The next three drives ended on punts. Oregon State subsequently had first-and-ten at the Oregon 36, but Day fumbled. Four plays later, after the Ducks converted their third and final first down, Simas became the first player all season to intercept a Jim Newquist pass, coming down with the ball at the Beaver 41. Oregon State would hold Oregon without a first down for the rest of the game. George Zellick came up with a circus catch of a Durdan pass to give Oregon State the ball inside of the Oregon 35, but Durdan fumbled on the next play, which ended both teams' last best opportunity of the first half.

A brisk south wind picked up in the second half, driving away the first half fog. Shelton returned the second half kickoff 16 yards for a first down at the Oregon State 19. On the first play from scrimmage, Durdan faked a pass to "sift off" the defensive end and then broke six tackles on a 35-yard run. However, the drive petered out at the Oregon 42. After exchanging punts, Dethman returned Mecham's punt 15 yards for a first down at the Duck 38. Durdan subsequently threw an 11-yard pass to Zellick for a first down at the Oregon 18. Shelton ran for no gain. Mecham, however, was flagged for roughing for throwing a punch, which gave the Beavers a first down at the three. Dethman and Durdan each ran for no gain, but Shelton ran for three yards off right guard for a touchdown to put Oregon State up 6–0 with 7:25 left in the third quarter in a hole that Shelton would later refer to as "Pasadena Avenue." Simas' extra point attempt was blown wide by the wind. The next three drives ended in punts. Durdan fumbled at the Beaver 20, and the Ducks recovered at the Oregon State 13. Greenough forced a fumble on the first play, which Oregon recovered for a loss. The Ducks wound up losing six on the drive and turned the ball over on downs after two incomplete passes at the Beaver 19. Oregon State's drive petered out, and the Beavers punted on the final play of the third quarter.

Oregon's first offensive play of the fourth quarter was a 53-yard Mecham touchdown run. Newquist kicked the extra point to put the Ducks up 7–6 with 14:45 left in the game. Oregon State's defense did not allow Oregon's offense to move the ball beyond its own 33 for the remainder of the game. The teams traded punts. The Beavers started their next drive at their own 40. Durdan threw to Zellick inches short of a first down. After an incomplete pass on second down, Day ran for a first down just inside Duck territory. Durdan passed to George Peters for 13 yards. Dethman ran for nine more down to the 29 to bring up a second down with less than a yard to gain. Day then ran over right tackle and appeared to be stopped before jumping to the right and into the clear. Newquist dove at Day at the five, but Day shrugged him off and ran all 29 yards for a touchdown and a 12-7 Oregon State lead with 11:40 left. Simas' extra point attempt was blocked. En route to the game, Day's parents' car broke down. Day's parents, though, were able to make it into the game shortly before Day's 29-yard touchdown run. The Ducks' final drive started at the Oregon 25. After Newquist's first down pass fell incomplete, the Ducks ran a play that involved four separate laterals. Ray Segale fumbled a lateral from Arnold "Duke" Iverson, which Zellick recovered at the Oregon 27. On fourth-and-eight, Durdan ran for nine and a first down with a minute left. Shortly thereafter, the weather finally broke, and it began to rain. The Beavers drove down to the seven, where the game ended. Oregon State finished ahead in pretty much every statistical category: first downs, 12–3; rushing yards, 252–126; passing yards, 99–37; and total yards, 351–163. Mecham's 53-yard run accounted for more than 40% of Oregon's rushing offense.

With the 12–7 win, the Beavers won the first Pacific Coast Conference football championship in Oregon State history. Mecham was selected 22nd overall in the 1942 NFL Draft.

=== After the Civil War ===
On the night after the game, Oregon State received all 10 Pacific Coast Conference votes to represent the Conference at the Rose Bowl. After being voted to represent the Conference, Oregon State was responsible for selecting and inviting the opposing team. The Western Conference, forerunner of the Big Ten Conference, did not permit their teams to play in bowl games until the Pacific Coast Conference entered into its 1946 agreement with the Western Conference. #1 undefeated and untied Minnesota thus chose to decline Oregon State's offer to play in the Rose Bowl. Notre Dame similarly refused to accept all bowl invitations between 1925 and 1970. So, #3 undefeated Notre Dame also chose to decline Oregon State's offer to play in the Rose Bowl. The best team in the country that might accept was #2 undefeated and untied Duke. However, the Blue Devils' head coach, Wallace Wade, had rubbed a lot of Westerners the wrong way by failing to congratulate Southern California's quarterback, Doyle Nave, and then subsequently stating that he would never bring another team to the Rose Bowl ever again. Most of the West Coast media championed Missouri with Fordham as a suitable alternative. Stiner advocated for Missouri, his former rival at Nebraska. The players generally favored inviting Fordham. Unknown to Oregon State, however, both #6 Fordham and #7 Missouri each received take it or leave it offers to the Sugar Bowl at approximately 2:00 a.m. on November 30. Both accepted the Sugar Bowl's offer. #4 Texas and #9 Texas A&M were informed that they would be considered for an invite to the Rose Bowl but would have to cancel their game with Oregon and Washington State, respectively, to avoid the chance of an upset. The Aggies and Longhorns informed the Beavers that they would honor their contracts. Unable to invite any top-seven team other than Duke, the Beavers officially invited the Blue Devils shortly after Oregon State received information that Fordham and Missouri had accepted bids to the Sugar Bowl. Duke accepted the invitation the next day on December 1. On December 2, Admiral Yamamoto sent the six carriers of the Kidō Butai the transmission, "Climb Mount Niitaka," the final order to attack Pearl Harbor. On December 3, The state threw the Beavers a big banquet at Portland's Multnomah Hotel. Governor Charles Sprague was one of the speakers, as was Secretary of State and future governor, Earl Snell, and the Mayor of Portland and Oregon State graduate, Earl Riley.

Four days later, on December 7, 354 planes from the six carriers of the Kidō Butai took off and attacked Oahu for 90 minutes in two waves. Japan declared war later in the day. The United States of America declared war on Japan the following day. With the United States' entry into World War II, there was concern about a Japanese attack on the West Coast of the United States. Much discussion focused on the possibility of an attack where any crowds might gather. The Rose Parade and its estimated one million spectators, as well as the Rose Bowl with 90,000 spectators, were presumed to be ideal targets for the Japanese. On December 13, 1941, Lieutenant General John L. DeWitt, commander of the Western Defense Command, recommended that the Rose Parade and Rose Bowl festivities be canceled. By December 15, the Tournament of Roses committee decided to cancel the game. Soon afterward, the government banned all large gatherings on the West Coast. This ruled out Bell Field, Oregon State's on-campus venue, and Multnomah Stadium, the largest football stadium in Oregon at the time, as alternative venues for the game. In order to ensure that the game would not be played in Pasadena, DeWitt ordered some army engineers to bivouac at the Rose Bowl.

On December 15, 1941, Duke University invited the game and Oregon State to Duke's home stadium in Durham, North Carolina. Oregon State chose Durham over Atlanta, Georgia; Baton Rouge, Louisiana; Chicago, Illinois; Kansas City, Missouri; Memphis, Tennessee; Oklahoma City, Oklahoma; and Washington, D.C.

At the time, Duke Stadium was the second-largest in the South but still could only hold 35,000 people. In order to accommodate the larger crowd expected for the Rose Bowl, bleachers were brought in from the University of North Carolina at Chapel Hill's Kenan Stadium and North Carolina State University's Riddick Stadium to seat an additional 20,000 people. All 58,000 tickets sold out to the game in three days. Bing Crosby reportedly bought 271 tickets. It is unclear whether Crosby attended the game. Although Duke generally reserved a small segregated block of tickets for African-Americans, Duke initially decided to not allow African-Americans to attend. After an article in Durham's African-American newspaper, the Carolina Times, claimed that Duke would sell tickets to Japanese-Americans but not African-Americans, Duke reversed its decision and, despite the game already having officially sold out, released 140 tickets to African-American fans in a segregated section.

Oregon State practiced in the rain until 5:45 p.m. on December 19, 1941, before driving to Albany. The train left Albany with 34 players on December 19, 1941, just three days after Duke University invited Oregon State. The train left 40 minutes late, causing the Portland Rose, the train in Portland, Oregon to be delayed. Greenough was suffering from the flu and was taken on a stretcher from the first train to the Portland Rose. When the Oregon State players boarded the Portland Rose, the train was unofficially renamed the Beaver Express. As the train pulled away from Portland train depot, standing on the platform was Yoshihara. Yoshihara had immigrated to the United States of America at the age of three on the last ship allowed into the United States before the United States put a moratorium on Japanese immigration. By executive order, no Japanese-Americans were permitted to go more than 35 miles (56 km) from their homes. Multiple FBI agents informed Oregon State coach, Lon Stiner that no exception would be made for Yoshihara. Teammates, students, and President Gilfillan protested the decision. President Gilfillan attended a meeting with student body president and football player, Andy Landforce, and the campus ROTC commandant. The meeting ended with the commandant stating, "The United States of America is at war, and the president's executive order will be carried out." Yoshihara, the Beavers' 34th player, watched the train leave Portland from the platform without him on it. Yoshihara would listen to the 1942 Rose Bowl on his radio. The train had to wait 40 minutes to allow the Oregon State players to board. In Hood River, Bob Dethman's family and friends greeted Bob. Alfred Dethman boarded the train to say goodbye to his son, wish him luck, and leave two boxes of apples on the train. Marvin Markman's family and friends greeted the team in The Dalles. The next day, Choc Shelton, suffering from laryngitis, got up before dawn to say goodbye to his father in La Grande. In Baker, George Bain and Martin Chaves' families and friends said goodbye. In Boise, Idaho, Stiner had the team run sprints up and down the station platform to get some exercise. Later that day, as the train sped by Glenns Ferry, Idaho, the 11 seniors voted unanimously to name Chaves the team captain for the game. Chaves had been drafted and was supposed to report for service in the United States Army Air Corps on January 24. As such, he would not be returning to school in 1942. Chaves was the only non-senior to be named a captain in 1941. By the time the train reached Pocatello, Idaho, the train was two-and-a-half hours behind schedule.

The next day, Lon Stiner met his dad in Grand Island, Nebraska. In Omaha, Nebraska, members of the University of Nebraska's N Club, composed entirely of former varsity lettermen, gave Stiner a good luck horseshoe. On December 22, 1941, at 8:45 a.m., 63 hours after leaving Corvallis, the Beaver Express arrived in Chicago. The University of Chicago had stopped playing football in 1939, so Oregon State used Chicago's Stagg Field. The train with the Beavers' equipment and uniforms did not arrive by practice time, so Oregon State players wore maroon warmups borrowed from the University of Chicago during kicking and passing drills. The equipment and uniform train arrived just in time for Martin Chaves, Bob Dethman, Donald Durdan, and Joe Day to dress in full pads for press pictures.

The 1942 NFL Draft was held on December 22, 1941, in Chicago, Illinois. Duke's All-American fullback Steve Lach was selected 4th overall. Dethman was drafted 20th overall. Duke's quarterback, Tommy Prothro, was selected 58th overall. Bill Halverson and George Peters were selected 63rd and 66th overall. Duke's All-American center and team captain, Bob Barnett, was selected 118th.

Oregon State left Chicago at 4:00 p.m. on December 22, 1941, on the Capital Limited. The next day, Oregon State stopped in Washington, D.C., to view the Capitol, the Washington Monument, Arlington National Cemetery, and Mount Vernon and for practice at Griffith Stadium, home of the Washington Redskins and Senators. Stiner intended to hold a full scrimmage, but Bain injured his foot on broken glass that had not been cleaned up, so Stiner decided to hold a conditioning workout instead. The train left from Washington, D.C. around 10:40 p.m. The Beaver Express finally stopped in Durham at 8:15 a.m. on December 24, 1941, 110 1/2 hours after leaving Corvallis. 2,000 people were on hand to greet the Beavers. The Durham High School band played "Hail to Old O.S.C." Mayor W.F. Carr made Chaves an honorary mayor of Durham. Oregon State travelled to the Washington Duke Inn to eat a breakfast sponsored by the Chamber of Commerce. After the breakfast, the Beavers travelled to the Carolina Inn in Chapel Hill. Oregon State practiced at the University of North Carolina's Kenan Stadium. Durdan sprained his wrist in the first scrimmage. The Beavers were back in Durham for Christmas dinner. Each Oregon State player was given a walking stick, three cartons of cigarettes, a pack of tobacco, a sack of biscuit flour, ties, suspenders, shorts, a box of silk stockings, two pairs of silk socks, and pillowcases. On the 27th, the Beavers scrimmaged again. Bill Halverson was so ill that he was confined to his bed for the day. Norm Peters went out with a back injury and Orville Zielaskowski was hospitalized with a head injury. Stiner allowed Oregon State to go to Pinehurst on the 28th. At a polo game at Pinehurst, a polo player, Frank McCleur's horse spooked and threw him into a tree, killing him instantly in full view of the Beavers. Oregon State practiced for the last time at Kenan Stadium on the 30th.

To simulate Oregon State, Duke was practicing against what Brian Curtis of Sports Illustrated would call "the most talented scout team in the country." It included Duke graduate George McAfee of the Chicago Bears to simulate Oregon State's Donald Durdan, as well as Duke graduate Jap Davis, the older brother of Tommy Davis, and North Carolina State senior Dick Watts.

On January 1, 1942, in Pasadena, the Rose Bowl Court and Queen, all clad in regular street clothes, drove down a deserted Colorado Boulevard, and later to a reception at the Huntington Hotel.

=== Duke ===
	1	2	3	4	Total
Beavers	7	0	13	0	20
Blue Devils	0	7	7	2	16

Duke and Oregon State had never met in football. The Blue Devils were the nation's leader in total offense and second in the nation in scoring. Duke's defense was the seventh-best in the nation and had not allowed more than 14 points all year. Duke's All-American fullback, Steve Lach, was also the nation's second-best punter. The Blue Devils were averaging a 30-point victory every time they took the field. In each game, Duke won by at least 13 points. The Blue Devils were on an 11-game winning streak, having gone 24-3 (all three losses on the road), and .889 winning percentage, since their 1939 Rose Bowl defeat. Duke's last loss in Durham, North Carolina, was more than four years prior. The Blue Devils were expected to win by more than two touchdowns and went off as a 4-1 favorite. Some wondered why Oregon State would even make the trip. On the day of the game, the 38-page special edition of the Durham Morning Herald predicted that the Blue Devils would defeat the Beavers 34–6. Oregon State's offensive line outweighed Duke's offensive line by nine pounds.

Before the game, the NBC announcer that called the game, Bill Stern, asserted that the Blue Devils could beat the Beavers by throwing 11 helmets on the field. The comment was heard by members of the Oregon State team at the hotel. After the game, George Zellick told reporters that the team was "hopped up" to win the game based on Stern's comment. One of Oregon State's players, third-string halfback Andy Landforce, dressed for the game. However, Stern knew little about the Beavers and only one Far West writer made the trip, so Stern requested that someone from Oregon State work in the booth as a color commentator. Assistant coach Jim Dixon selected Landforce to represent the Beavers in the booth. So, Landforce dressed down and went to the booth to call the game. The weather seemed to favor the visitors. One Duke player claimed that there was more rain than he had ever seen. Another said that the weather could not be worse. The Beavers' Landforce described the weather as "a beautiful gray day." Gene Gray, looking up at the same sky, described the weather as "misty." The temperature was a hair over 40 degrees at kickoff. The precipitation stopped partway through the first period, but it had rained for the 10 hours prior.

After Oregon State boarded the bus, Stiner did not allow the driver to drive until after he expressed to the Beaver players his opinion that Duke would "smash" Oregon State. Partway between Chapel Hill and Durham, Stiner had the driver and police escort purposefully "get lost." Stiner then staged a shouting match between him and one member of the police escort. Even with Stiner's theatrics, the Beavers still arrived on time for the game. The referee that was supposed to handle the opening coin flip was Lee Eisan. Eisan was the second-string quarterback for the 1929 California Golden Bears, who lost the Rose Bowl 8–7 to Georgia Tech after Roy "Wrong Way" Riegels ran 69 yards the wrong direction to set up the game-winning Georgia Tech safety. Eisan made a less often talked about blunder. In the third quarter, trailing 8–0, California ran an end around pass on fourth down. The end around sucked all of the Georgia Tech defenders in. Eisan used the misdirection to get behind the defenders and might have scored a touchdown but lost his balance and failed to make the catch. Eisan could not find a silver dollar in North Carolina, so he borrowed a 50-cent piece from Oregon State's captain, Martin Chaves. The Blue Devils won the toss and elected to receive. Before kickoff, there was a moment of silence to honor those lost at Pearl Harbor 25 days before.

Oregon State's Norman Peters kicked the opening kickoff. Duke's Tommy Davis collected the ball at his own six-yard line. He was crushed by the Beavers' Lloyd Wickett and two other Beavers and fumbled at the Blue Devil 28. George Peters recovered at Duke's 29. Dethman passed to George Peters for three yards. Durdan's second down pass was incomplete. Durdan then broke multiple tackles on a six-yard run to set up a fourth-and-one at the Blue Devils' 20. Dethman passed to George Peters again for three yards and a first down. Day ran for two yards. Durdan again threw incomplete. On third-and-eight, Durdan ran for a yard down to Duke's 14. Prothro then batted down Oregon State's fourth-and-seven heave to the end zone for a turnover on downs. The teams traded possession most of the first quarter. After the rain stopped, the Beavers drove 33 yards to the Blue Devil 19. Durdan converted one fourth-and-one on the drive. Oregon State managed four yards on the first two plays. On third-and-six at the Blue Devil 15, Oregon State's Donald Durdan went back to pass. With no receiver open, he pump faked and then went off right tackle, walking into the end zone almost untouched. Warren Simas kicked the extra point to put the Beavers up 7–0 with 1:40 left in the first quarter.

With 11 minutes left in the half, Davis ran 29 yards. A few plays later, Lach ran 25 yards on a reverse. Lach almost ran for a touchdown but Gene Gray was able to drag down Lach from behind at the Oregon State nine. On third-and-goal at the four, Lach ran four yards on a reverse. Bob Gantt's extra point tied the game at seven. Oregon State's ensuing drive resulted in an interception at the 46, which was returned to the Beaver 27. On third-and-nine, the Blue Devils had a wide open receiver behind the Beaver defense, but the pass was just beyond the receiver's outstretched fingertips and fell incomplete. Duke ultimately turned the ball over on downs. The Blue Devils would threaten again late in the first half after an Oregon State fumble gave Duke a first down at the Beaver 32. Two plays later, though, the Oregon State defense forced a fumble after a sack, which was recovered by the Beavers. As the half was coming to a close, Duke drove to the Oregon State 42. Two passes were dropped by Blue Devil receivers. Duke's Bobby Rute caught the third at the Beaver 10 and advanced it to the Beaver 5. However, the Blue Devils were unable to get a play off before the halftime whistle sounded, and the teams jogged off the field tied 7-7.

Major Swede Larson, Navy's head coach spoke with sportswriter, Grantland Rice, at halftime and said, "Duke is being hit harder and keener than at any time during the season. Duke doesn't seem to be quite used to this." Stiner told his team, "Boys, we have this one. This is our game, and when...." At that point, he was interrupted by an inebriated fan looking to urinate in the Beaver locker room.

Oregon State took the second half kickoff. After a first down, the Beavers punted down to Duke's 30. On the Blue Devils' subsequent drive, Lach ran for 21 yards on a fake punt and Davis threw to Gantt for another 16 for a first down at the Oregon State 28. On first down, Duke ran a triple reverse and lost 12 yards. After an incomplete pass, the Beaver defense sacked Davis for a seven-yard loss, which ended the threat. Lach's punt rolled out of bounds at the 15. The Beavers drove 73 yards, 42 yards coming on one Dethman to Durdan pass to the Blue Devil 27. Day picked up 11. Oregon State gained four to the Duke 12 before getting pushed back to Blue Devil 15. Simas missed the subsequent 33-yard field goal attempt. The Beavers' defense pushed the Blue Devils back to their own nine. On third down, Duke quick kicked, and the Beavers started their next drive at their own 46. The defenses, which played brilliantly for most of the game let down for the subsequent three-drive stretch. Gray ran for 24 yards down to the Blue Devils' 30. With four minutes left in the third quarter, Dethman threw a 22-yard pass to Zellick. Zellick evaded multiple tacklers to run the remaining eight yards for a 30-yard touchdown pass. Simas kicked the extra point to put the Beavers up 14–7. Duke would respond on the very next drive, getting 48 yards on two Lach reverses and 15 yards for unnecessary roughness. On the next play, the Blue Devils scored on a one-yard run by Winston Siegfried with two minutes left in the third quarter. Tommy Prothro kicked the extra point to knot the game at 14. Duke's coach, Wallace Wade, who had won the 1926 Rose Bowl while at Alabama after a comeback against Washington, remarked to an assistant that, "It looks like 1926 all over again." 1942 would play out differently than 1926. In the following drive, Durdan returned the kickoff back to the Beaver 23. Day lost six but the Blue Devils were flagged for unnecessary roughness to the 32. With less than a minute left in the third quarter, Dethman found streaking reserve halfback, Gene Gray, on a 40-yard pass. Safety Tommy Davis just mistimed an interception. Gray faked inside and went outside, which confused Moffatt Storer, the Blue Devil cornerback, so badly that he fell down. The Duke safety on the far side of the field took a good angle, but Gray was simply too fast and outran the safety the final 28 yards into the end zone. The 68-yard pass play was the longest in Rose Bowl history and would remain the longest pass play for more than 20 years. The extra point would be blocked, leaving the door open for a Duke comeback. The 20 points that Oregon State scored were the most scored on the Blue Devils since 1930, the year before Wade became head football coach. It was the most points scored against a Wade-coached team since 1928.

The 14 points that Duke scored were the most that the Oregon State's defense had given up all year. The Beaver defense seemed resolved to make sure the 20-points the offense had put up would stand up. Duke's offense would cross into Beaver territory three times in the fourth-quarter, but the Beavers would not break, intercepting two passes and recovering a fumble. After a Duke punt went out of bounds at the Oregon State two, the Beavers opted to quick kick. However, Durden mishandled the snap. Rather than attempting the punt, Durden tried to advance the ball out of the end zone, but Mike Karmazin caught Durden before Durden was able to do so for a safety with less than 10 minutes left in the game. The Blue Devils ensuing drive ended on a fumble at the Beaver 29. What appeared to be a great Oregon State return of the fumble was nullified by an inadvertent whistle. With two minutes left, the Blue Devils started a drive at their own 33. Durdan picked off a 30-yard Davis pass and returned it to the Beaver 40. On first down, Day lost five yards. Durdan ran for three yards. Rather than attempt another play on third-and-12, Durdan punted 38 yards out of bounds at Duke's 26. With less than a minute left, Rute hit Jim Smith on 28-yard pass play to give the Blue Devils a first down at the Beaver 46. Duke hurled two passes toward the Beaver end zone. Day broke up the first. The second also fell incomplete. On the final play of the game, Wade called a Lach reverse. Prothro audibled and called for a Davis pass play. Dethman came up with a game-saving interception. The Beavers won 20–16.

Oregon State outgained Duke 302–295 with a 148–73 edge in the air. The Beavers also out-punted the Blue Devils. Even factoring in the 1942 Rose Bowl, Oregon State's defense was statistically the best Beaver defense in 15 years.

=== After the season ===
Donald Durdan ran for 54 yards and a touchdown, passed, punted, and collected one interception. He was named the game's most valuable player. Bob Dethman also distinguished himself by throwing for two touchdowns and coming up with the interception that ended the game. The 1942 Rose Bowl remains the only Beavers' Rose Bowl victory. It also remains the only time the two programs have played each other.

Although many others argue that Columbia's 1934 victory over Stanford was bigger, Sid Feder of the Associated Press labeled it the biggest upset in the Rose Bowl's early history.

Referee Lee Eisan, who borrowed a 50-cent piece from Oregon State's Martin Chaves to conduct the coin flip, made it back to Berkeley, California with Chaves' 50-cent piece in hand, upset that he had failed to return the coin.

The East–West Shrine Game has been played after every college football season since 1925. The game started in San Francisco, California and, prior to 2006, would be played in the Bay Area every year, except for two years. The first year outside of the Bay Area was 1942. As a result of the prohibition against playing football in West Coast stadiums, the East–West Shrine Game was moved to New Orleans, Louisiana. The West's coach was Washington State's Billy Sewell. A little more than two months prior, Sewell and the Cougars had dealt the Beavers the Beavers' largest loss of the year, a 7-0 decision in Pullman, Washington. Oregon State attended the postgame banquet with Duke and left Durham, North Carolina, at 12:40 a.m. on January 2, 1941, bound for New Orleans. The Beaver Express left Durham and stopped in New Orleans for the game on January 3, 1942. The game ended in a 6–6 tie. Many were concerned that the East–West Shrine Game would be the last football game "in a generation." Stiner left the team in New Orleans to visit his parents in Nebraska. On the way back to Corvallis, the Beaver Express stopped in Houston and San Antonio. In El Paso, some of the players purchased alcohol, in order to last them to Tucson, because New Mexico was a dry state. Oregon State was able to visit the Rose Bowl in Pasadena, California. After a stop in Sacramento on January 7, Durdan and Simas disembarked from the Beaver Express to visit family in Northern California. Both were honored at the Vance Hotel in Eureka, California. The Beaver Express arrived back in Albany on January 8, 1942, at 5:16 a.m. Over the previous 19 days, 11 hours, and 31 minutes, the assistant coaches and most of the members of the team traveled 7,384 miles, through 24 states.

Grantland Rice rode out of Durham, North Carolina with Oregon State. In his article after the game, Rice, in explaining why Oregon State had won, said that the Beavers had played a much harder schedule than the Blue Devils. Further, he said that Oregon State "had been used to hard battling – and could give it and take it. They had been hit hard all season, while Duke had been on a flock of picnics, largely in soft meadows."

Stiner returned to campus on January 16, 1942. 700 fans turned out to fete Stiner and the Oregon State players. Governor Sprague was one of the principal speakers, referring to the Beavers as the "Champions of America!"

The Beavers ended up receiving $81,267.22 as their share for the Durham Rose Bowl. This was more than the $50,000.00 that they expected to receive from the Pasadena Rose Bowl.

After the 1942 Allied victory in the Battle of Midway and the end of the Japanese offensives in the Pacific Theater during 1942, it was deemed that the West Coast was no longer vulnerable to attack, and the Rose Bowl game continued on in the Rose Bowl Stadium.

== Team players drafted into the NFL ==
Player	Position	Round	Pick	NFL club
Bob Dethman	Back	3	20	Detroit Lions
Bill Halverson	Guard	8	63	Philadelphia Eagles
George Peters	Back	8	66	Washington Redskins

== Awards and honors ==
- Don Durdan, Rose Bowl Player Of The Game
