= 1941 Stanford Indians football team =

American college football season

1941 Stanford Indians football
- Conference: Pacific Coast Conference
- Record: 6–3 (4–3 PCC)
- Head coach: Clark Shaughnessy (2nd season)
- Offensive scheme: T formation
- Home stadium: Stanford Stadium

1941 Pacific Coast Conference football standings
	Conf.					Overall
Team	W		L		T	W		L		T
No. 12 Oregon State $	7	–	2	–	0	8	–	2	–	0
Washington	5	–	3	–	0	5	–	4	–	0
No. 19 Washington State	5	–	3	–	0	6	–	4	–	0
Stanford	4	–	3	–	0	6	–	3	–	0
Oregon	4	–	4	–	0	5	–	5	–	0
UCLA	3	–	4	–	1	5	–	5	–	1
California	3	–	4	–	0	4	–	5	–	0
USC	2	–	4	–	1	2	–	6	–	1
Montana	1	–	3	–	0	6	–	3	–	0
Idaho	0	–	4	–	0	4	–	5	–	0
$ – Conference champion; Rankings from AP Poll

The 1941 Stanford Indians football team represented Stanford University as a member of the Pacific Coast Conference (PCC) during the 1941 college football season. Second-year head coach Clark Shaughnessy led the team to a 6–3 record. Before the season, Stanford, which the year prior had finished 10–0, was considered a favorite for the national championship, but three conference losses put it out of contention for a return to the Rose Bowl. After the season, Shaughnessy left Stanford to take over as head coach at the University of Maryland.

== Schedule ==
Date	Opponent	Rank	Site	Result	Attendance	Source
September 27	Oregon		Stanford Stadium; Stanford, CA	W 19–15	35,000	
October 4	UCLA		Stanford Stadium; Stanford, CA	W 33–0	40,000	
October 11	at Oregon State		Bell Field; Corvallis, OR	L 0–10	22,000	
October 18	San Francisco*		Stanford Stadium; Stanford, CA	W 42–26	7,000	
October 25	at Washington	No. T–19	Husky Stadium; Seattle, WA	W 13–7	43,000	
November 1	Santa Clara*	No. 12	Stanford Stadium; Stanford, CA	W 27–7	65,000	
November 8	at USC	No. 9	Los Angeles Memorial Coliseum; Los Angeles, CA (rivalry)	W 13–0	87,000	
November 15	Washington State	No. 6	Stanford Stadium; Stanford, CA	L 13–14	45,000	
November 29	California		Stanford Stadium; Stanford, CA (Big Game)	L 0–16	70,000	
*Non-conference game; Rankings from AP Poll released prior to the game

== Rankings ==
Ranking movements Legend: ██ Increase in ranking ██ Decrease in ranking — = Not ranked т = Tied with team above or below ( ) = First-place votes
	Week							
Poll	1	2	3	4	5	6	7	Final
AP	—	19т	12	9	6 (1)	17	—	—

== Before the season ==
The Indians lost two stars from the previous season, right halfback Hugh Gallarneau and fullback Norm Standlee, to graduation, but returned quarterback Frankie Albert. Shaughnessy made the "pessimistic" projection that the team would drop at least two games. Before and early in the season, expectations were high for Stanford, and alongside Minnesota, the Indians were considered among the frontrunners for the national championship. Throughout the course of the season, however, injuries hindered the team.

== Season ==
Neither Stanford nor Minnesota were considered overly impressive in narrow victories in their season openers. The Indians edged Oregon, 19–15. The International News Service reported that Stanford "was not the polished, meticulous outfit it was when it trimmed Nebraska" in the previous season's Rose Bowl. Stanford then routed UCLA, 33–0. The following week, Oregon State snapped Stanford's 13-game winning streak. The Associated Press credited Beavers center Quentin Greenough with leading Oregon State's defensive effort, which blanked Stanford's potent T-formation, 10–0. Greenough was injured in the fourth quarter and had to be carried out by stretcher.

Against Washington, Stanford scored two second-quarter touchdowns and turned back multiple Huskies' drives. The Indians had two additional touchdowns negated by penalties, but won, 13–7. On a mud-logged field, Stanford back Pete Kmetovic scored five minutes into the game against Santa Clara. Later in the first quarter, Buck Fawcett broke free for an 84-yard touchdown run, and before halftime, Kmetovic returned an interception 40 yards to put the Indians back in position for a third score. Stanford's defense held Santa Clara at bay for the remainder of the game, and turned back two Bronco drives on the four-yard line for a final result of 27–7.

After defeating USC, 13–0, the Indians fell in their penultimate game against Washington State. The result tied Stanford, Washington, and Oregon State for first-place in the Pacific Coast Conference with two losses each, and all still vying for a berth in the Rose Bowl. Stanford's loss to underdogs California, 16–0, in the finale put them out of contention for the postseason game invitation. The Indians finished with a 6–3 record.

== After the season ==
In March 1942, Shaughnessy turned down a head coaching offer from Yale University, but said he was considering the same job at another Eastern school with little football tradition. A short time later, he resigned to accept the job at Maryland. According to Sports Illustrated in 1977, Shaughnessy's decision was based on his belief that Stanford would discontinue its football program during World War II.

The 1942 NFL draft was held on December 10, 1941. The following Indians were selected.

Round	Pick	Player	Position	NFL club
1	3	Pete Kmetovic	Halfback	Philadelphia Eagles
1	10	Frankie Albert	Quarterback	Chicago Bears
2	13	Vic Lindskog	Center	Philadelphia Eagles
12	103	Fred Meyer	End	Philadelphia Eagles
17	153	Arnie Meiners	End	Philadelphia Eagles
