= Wallace Wade Stadium =

American football stadium on Duke University campus in Durham, NC, US

Brooks Field at Wallace Wade Stadium
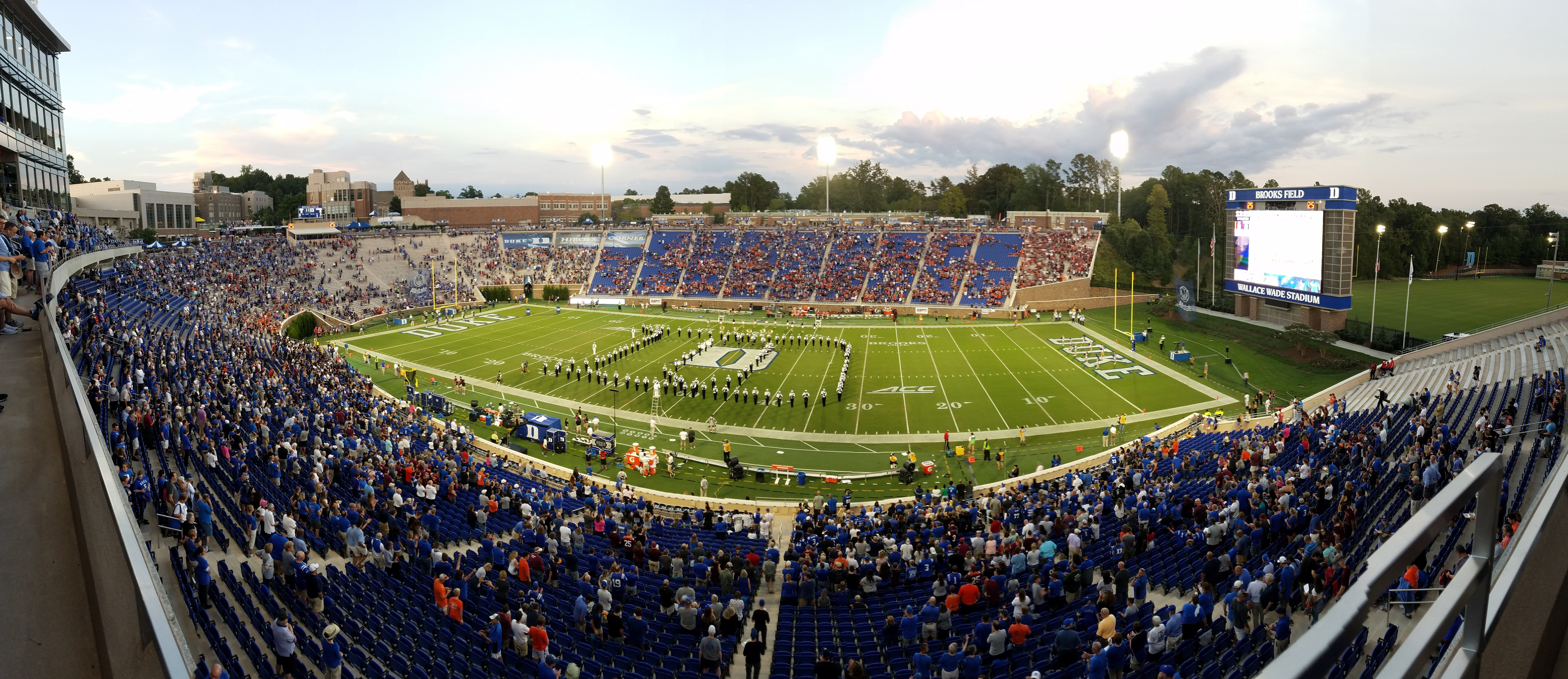
- Panoramic view from west in 2018

- Location in North Carolina Location in the United States
- Former names: Duke Stadium (1929–1967)
- Location: Frank Bassett Drive; Durham, North Carolina
- Coordinates: 35°59′43″N 78°56′30″W
- Owner: Duke University
- Operator: Duke University
- Capacity: 35,018 (2024–present) Former capacity List: 40,004 (2016-2023); 33,941 (1982–2015); 40,078 (1978–1981); 44,000 (1942–1977); 35,000 (1929–1941)
- Surface: Latitude 36 Bermuda Grass
- Record attendance: 57,500 (November 19, 1949)

Construction
- Groundbreaking: December 1928
- Opened: October 5, 1929; 96 years ago
- Renovated: 2014–2017
- Expanded: 2016
- Cost: $4 million ($75 million in 2025)
- Architect: Horace Trumbauer

Tenants
- Duke Blue Devils football (1929–present); Rose Bowl Game (1942); Pelican Bowl (1972)

Website
- goduke.com/wallace-wade-stadium

Wallace Wade Stadium, in full Brooks Field at Wallace Wade Stadium, is a 35,018-seat outdoor stadium in the southeastern United States, located on the campus of Duke University in Durham, North Carolina. Primarily used for American football, it is the home field of the Duke Blue Devils of the Atlantic Coast Conference.

Opened in 1929, it was the first facility in Duke's new West Campus. Originally called Duke Stadium, it was renamed in 1967 for former head coach Wallace Wade. The playing surface was renamed Brooks Field at the beginning of the 2015 season after the removal of the track and lowering of the field-level seats.

== History ==
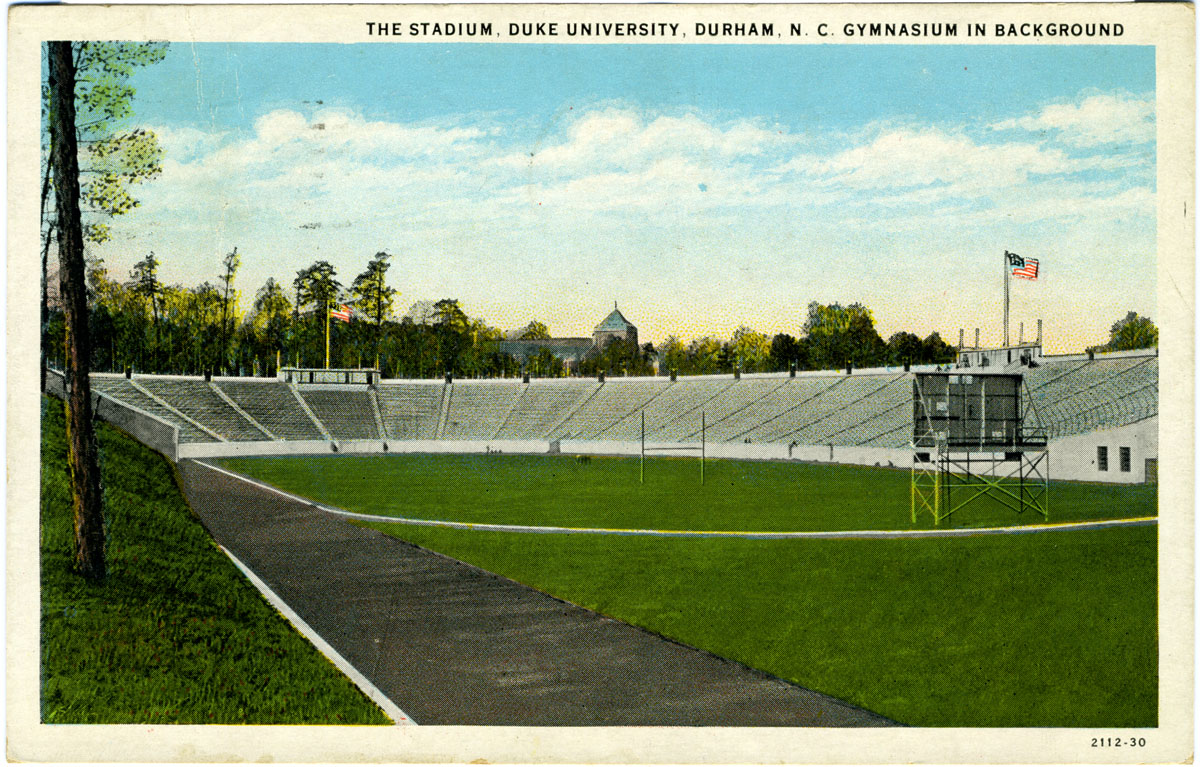
Duke Stadium in 1932

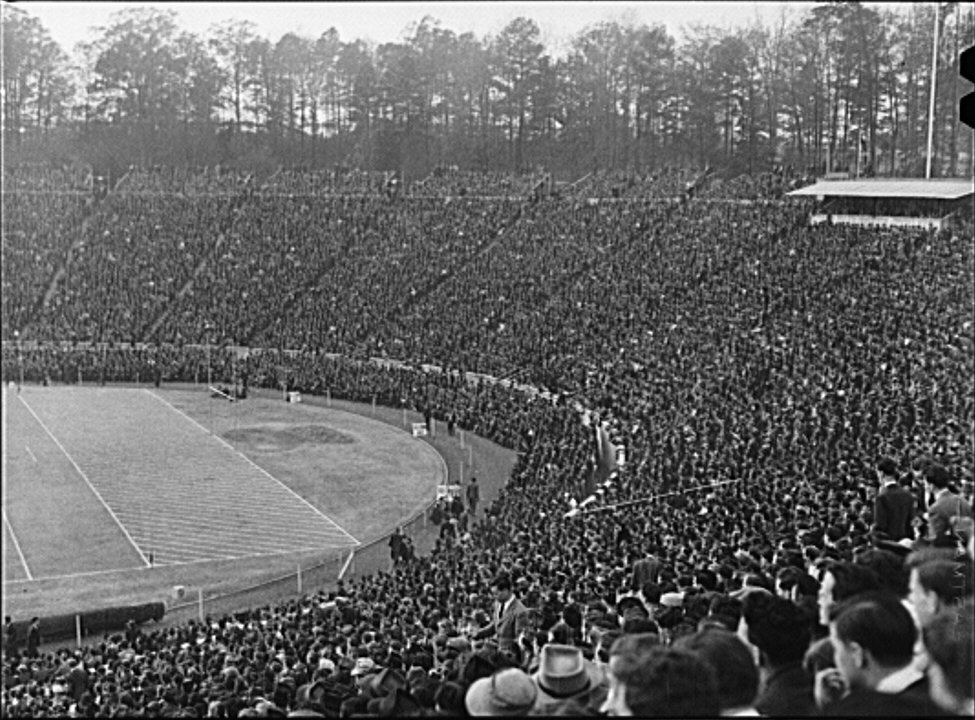
An attendance record was set in 1939, against the seventh-ranked North Carolina Tar Heels. The 13–3 Duke win was seen by over 52,000 fans. New records were set in 1942, 1947, 1949.

Wallace Wade Stadium opened in 1929 as "Duke Stadium", largely funded with bonds—the school advertised for "1,000 individuals to invest $100 in Duke's athletic future" and offered 6% interest.

The stadium is notable for being the site of the 1942 Rose Bowl on New Year's Day. Duke had won the invitation to the game as the eastern representative. However, the attack on Pearl Harbor on December 7, just weeks after the end of the 1941 season, led to fears of a Japanese attack on the West Coast. General John L. DeWitt, commander of the Western Defense Command, advised the Tournament of Roses Association not to hold the game at the Rose Bowl in southern California, since he was not willing to take a chance on the Japanese choosing to stage a bombing raid on a stadium with over 90,000 people in attendance. Soon afterward, the government banned all large public gatherings on the West Coast, which ruled out Bell Field in Corvallis, Oregon, the on-campus venue of Oregon State, the host team from the Pacific Coast Conference (PCC). The Tournament of Roses Association originally planned to cancel the game, but Duke officials invited the Rose Bowl and Oregon State to Durham to play the game, and the offer was accepted.

On a cold, rainy January 1, 1942, 56,000 fans, 22,000 of whom sat on bleachers borrowed from nearby NC State and UNC, watched the heavily-favored Blue Devils fall to the strong defense of the Beavers, 20–16. Until 2021, it was the only Rose Bowl Game played outside of Pasadena, California; the game remains the only Rose Bowl to have been played in the Eastern United States.

In 1967, the venue was renamed for head coach Wallace Wade.

In 1972, Wallace Wade Stadium hosted the first edition of the Pelican Bowl, a short-lived attempt at a black college football national championship game between the winner of the MEAC and the winner of the SWAC. Grambling defeated NC Central by a score of 56–6 in front of 22,500 fans.

In October 2012, Duke announced major renovations projected to eventually seat 43,915.

In 2015, Steve Brooks, Duke alumnus and CEO of the Phoenix American Insurance Group, donated $13 million to the Duke Athletics department. The playing surface was renamed Brooks Field in his honor.

=== Renovations ===
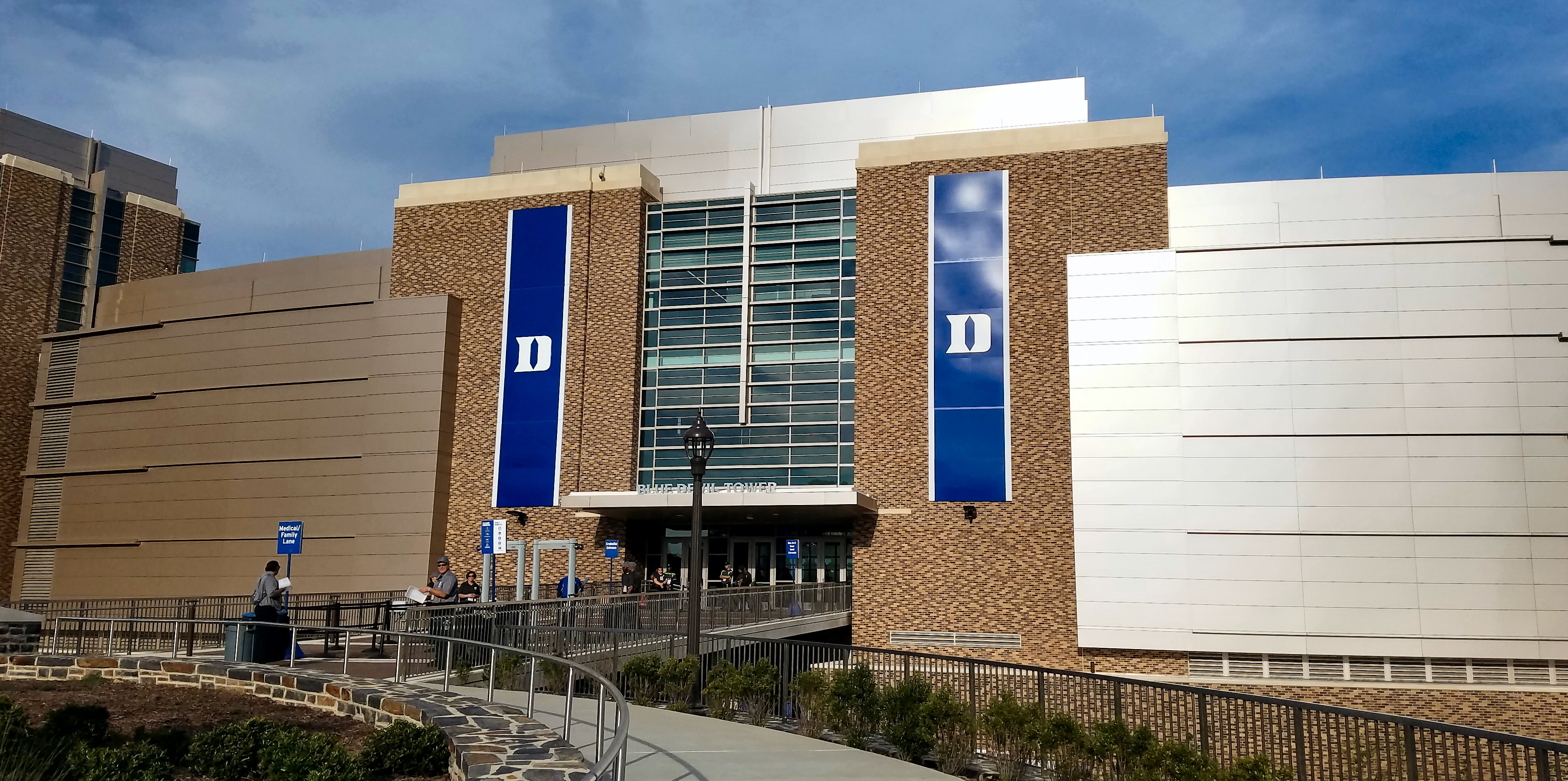
Blue Devil Tower opened in 2016 with 516 club seats and 21 suites.

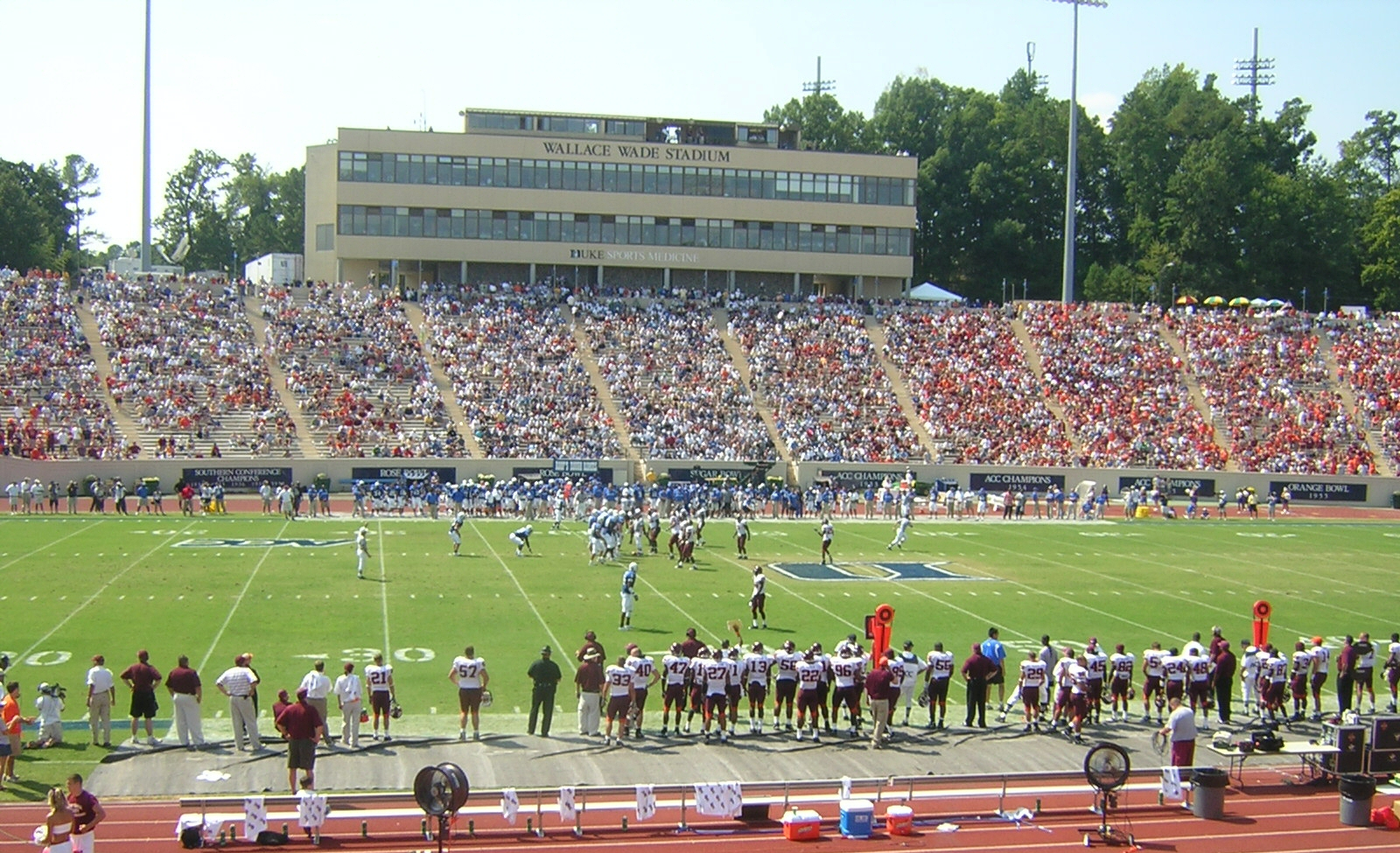
The stadium in 2005, prior to the renovation of the west side press box

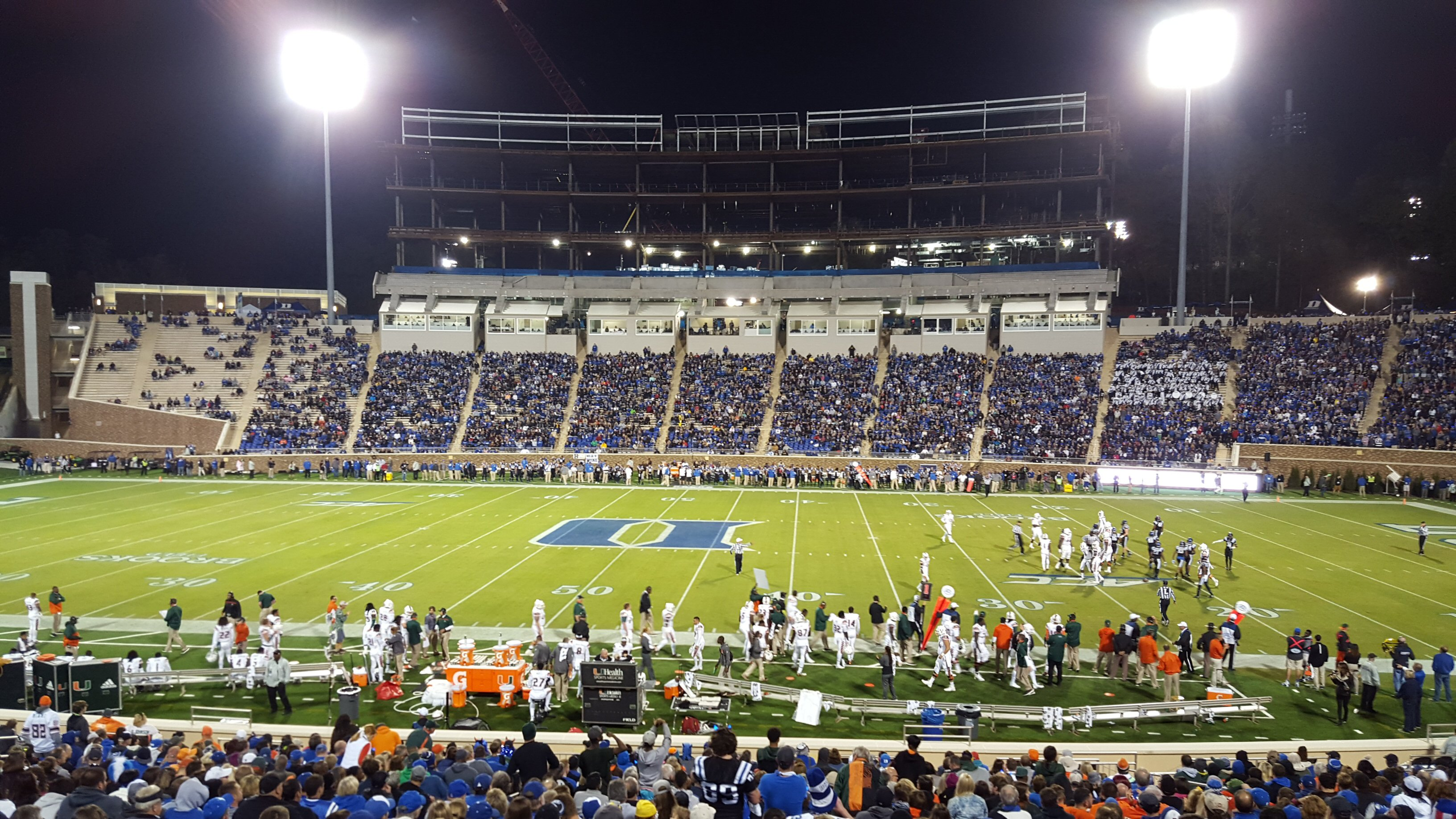
Stadium in 2015, with Blue Devil Tower under construction

In September 2014, renovation plans were released. The new stadium would seat nearly 40,000 and have 21 luxury suites housed within a new five-story, 90,000-square-foot (8,400 m^{2}) tower along the stadium's west side. A new 42 feet (13 m) high by 75.6 feet (23.0 m) wide LED video board would be installed 90 feet (27 m) closer to the field than the previous one. Another notable feature was the removal of the stadium's track, which allowed 4,000 additional seats to be added along with lowering and recentering the field. The concourses along the stadium's north and west sides were enhanced with new concessions and new gates, restroom facilities and first aid stations. Integrated seating in compliance with the Americans with Disabilities Act were also added for disabled guests and their companions. The first two phases of the renovations were finished over a two-year period, including the new press box, eight broadcast booths and suites completed by the 2016 college football season.

Phase three was completed prior to the 2017 season. It included completion of ADA boxes currently in one-third of the concourse on the north and east concourse, rebuilding the concourse surface, and construction of a north gate ticket booth and various concessions, bathroom, and future store buildings on the east concourse. The alumni box on the north concourse was also replaced with a new auxiliary scoreboard.

A terraced area known as the "Devils Deck" was added for the 2024 season at the north end of the stadium, reducing capacity to 35,018. The new area features a tailgate-like experience with both standing room and non-reserved seating, an unlimited food package, yard games, and a DJ.

== Concerts ==
Date	Artist	Opening act(s)	Tour / Concert name	Attendance	Notes
April 24, 1971	The Grateful Dead	—	—	—	This concert was part of Joe College Weekend.
October 8, 2005	The Rolling Stones	Trey Anastasio	A Bigger Bang Tour	approx. 40,000	
September 27, 2024	Ed Sheeran	—	—	approx. 17,000	This concert was part of Duke's Centennial Founder’s Day and Homecoming Celebration Weekend.

== See also ==
- List of NCAA Division I FBS football stadiums
- List of American football stadiums by capacity
- Lists of stadiums
