= 1941 UCLA Bruins football team =

American college football season

1941 UCLA Bruins football
- Conference: Pacific Coast Conference
- Record: 5–5–1 (3–4–1 PCC)
- Head coach: Edwin C. Horrell (3rd season)
- Home stadium: Los Angeles Memorial Coliseum

1941 Pacific Coast Conference football standings
	Conf.					Overall
Team	W		L		T	W		L		T
No. 12 Oregon State $	7	–	2	–	0	8	–	2	–	0
Washington	5	–	3	–	0	5	–	4	–	0
No. 19 Washington State	5	–	3	–	0	6	–	4	–	0
Stanford	4	–	3	–	0	6	–	3	–	0
Oregon	4	–	4	–	0	5	–	5	–	0
UCLA	3	–	4	–	1	5	–	5	–	1
California	3	–	4	–	0	4	–	5	–	0
USC	2	–	4	–	1	2	–	6	–	1
Montana	1	–	3	–	0	6	–	3	–	0
Idaho	0	–	4	–	0	4	–	5	–	0
$ – Conference champion; Rankings from AP Poll

The 1941 UCLA Bruins football team was an American football team that represented the University of California, Los Angeles (UCLA) in Pacific Coast Conference (PCC) during the 1941 college football season. In their third season under head coach Edwin C. Horrell, the Bruins compiled a 5–5–1 record (3–4–1 against PCC opponents), finished fifth in the PCC, and were outscored by a total of 178 to 128.

Quarterback Bob Waterfield later played for the Los Angeles Rams and was inducted into the Pro Football Hall of Fame. Other key players included Clarence Mackey, a transfer player from Compton Junior College.

UCLA was ranked at No. 77 (out of 681 teams) in the final rankings under the Litkenhous Difference by Score System for 1941.

== Schedule ==
Date	Opponent	Site	Result	Attendance	Source
September 26	Washington State	Los Angeles Memorial Coliseum; Los Angeles, CA	W 7–6	45,000	
October 4	at Stanford	Stanford Stadium; Stanford, CA	L 0–33	40,000	
October 10	Montana	Los Angeles Memorial Coliseum; Los Angeles, CA	W 14–7	20,000	
October 18	at Washington	Husky Stadium; Seattle, WA	L 7–14	18,000	
October 25	No. 16 Oregon	Los Angeles Memorial Coliseum; Los Angeles, CA	W 14–7	30,000	
November 1	California	Los Angeles Memorial Coliseum; Los Angeles, CA (rivalry)	L 7–27	50,000	
November 8	at Oregon State	Bell Field; Corvallis, OR	L 0–19	10,000	
November 15	Camp Haan*	Los Angeles Memorial Coliseum; Los Angeles, CA	W 29–0	15,000	
November 22	Santa Clara*	Los Angeles Memorial Coliseum; Los Angeles, CA	L 13–31	25,000	
December 6	USC	Los Angeles Memorial Coliseum; Los Angeles, CA (Victory Bell)	T 7–7	60,000	
December 20	at Florida*	Fairfield Stadium; Jacksonville, FL	W 30–27	8,000	
*Non-conference game; Rankings from AP Poll released prior to the game

== Game summaries ==
=== USC ===
	1	2	3	4	Total
UCLA	0	0	7	0	7
USC	0	0	7	0	7

Bob Waterfield lateraled to Vic Smith for a 12-yard touchdown in the third quarter to put the Bruins on the scoreboard first. Bobby Robertson scored from the 1-yard line for USC.

== 1941 NFL draft ==
The following players were claimed in the 1941 NFL draft.

Player	Position	Round	Pick	NFL club
Jack Sommers	Center	11	92	Chicago Cardinals
Alex Schibanoff	Tackle	14	125	Detroit Lions
