= 1941 California Golden Bears football team =

American college football season

1941 California Golden Bears football
- Conference: Pacific Coast Conference
- Record: 4–5 (3–4 PCC)
- Head coach: Stub Allison (7th season)
- Home stadium: Memorial Stadium

1941 Pacific Coast Conference football standings
	Conf.					Overall
Team	W		L		T	W		L		T
No. 12 Oregon State $	7	–	2	–	0	8	–	2	–	0
Washington	5	–	3	–	0	5	–	4	–	0
No. 19 Washington State	5	–	3	–	0	6	–	4	–	0
Stanford	4	–	3	–	0	6	–	3	–	0
Oregon	4	–	4	–	0	5	–	5	–	0
UCLA	3	–	4	–	1	5	–	5	–	1
California	3	–	4	–	0	4	–	5	–	0
USC	2	–	4	–	1	2	–	6	–	1
Montana	1	–	3	–	0	6	–	3	–	0
Idaho	0	–	4	–	0	4	–	5	–	0
$ – Conference champion; Rankings from AP Poll

The 1941 California Golden Bears football team was an American football team that represented the University of California, Berkeley as a member of the Pacific Coast Conference during the 1941 college football season. In their seventh season under head coach Stub Allison, the Golden Bears compiled a 4–5 record (3–4 against PCC opponents), finished seventh in the PCC, and outscored opponents by a total of 107 to 71.

Tackle Bob Reinhard was selected by both the Associated Press and United Press as a first-team player on the 1941 All-Pacific Coast football team.

California was ranked at No. 33 (out of 681 teams) in the final rankings under the Litkenhous Difference by Score System for 1941.

== Schedule ==
Date	Opponent	Site	Result	Attendance	Source
September 27	Saint Mary's*	Memorial Stadium; Berkeley, CA	W 31–0	60,000	
October 4	at Washington State	Rogers Field; Pullman, WA	L 6–13	5,000	
October 11	Santa Clara*	Memorial Stadium; Berkeley, CA	L 0–13	56,000	
October 18	at Oregon	Multnomah Stadium; Portland, OR	L 7–19	22,000	
October 25	USC	Memorial Stadium; Berkeley, CA	W 14–0	30,000	
November 1	at UCLA	Los Angeles Memorial Coliseum; Los Angeles, CA (rivalry)	W 27–7	50,000	
November 8	Washington	Memorial Stadium; Berkeley, CA	L 6–13	30,000	
November 15	Oregon State	Memorial Stadium; Berkeley, CA	L 0–6	20,000	
November 29	at Stanford	Stanford Stadium; Stanford, CA (Big Game)	W 16–0	70,000	
*Non-conference game
