= 1941 Oregon Ducks football team =

American college football season

1941 Oregon Ducks football
- Conference: Pacific Coast Conference
- Record: 5–5 (4–4 PCC)
- Head coach: Tex Oliver (4th season)
- Captain: None
- Home stadium: Hayward Field

1941 Pacific Coast Conference football standings
	Conf.					Overall
Team	W		L		T	W		L		T
No. 12 Oregon State $	7	–	2	–	0	8	–	2	–	0
Washington	5	–	3	–	0	5	–	4	–	0
No. 19 Washington State	5	–	3	–	0	6	–	4	–	0
Stanford	4	–	3	–	0	6	–	3	–	0
Oregon	4	–	4	–	0	5	–	5	–	0
UCLA	3	–	4	–	1	5	–	5	–	1
California	3	–	4	–	0	4	–	5	–	0
USC	2	–	4	–	1	2	–	6	–	1
Montana	1	–	3	–	0	6	–	3	–	0
Idaho	0	–	4	–	0	4	–	5	–	0
$ – Conference champion; Rankings from AP Poll

The 1941 Oregon Ducks football team was an American football team that represented the University of Oregon in the Pacific Coast Conference (PCC) during the 1941 college football season. In their fourth season under head coach Tex Oliver, the Ducks compiled a 5–5 record (4–4 against PCC opponents), finished in fifth place in the PCC, and were outscored by a total of 184 to 136.

Oregon was ranked at No. 54 (out of 681 teams) in the final rankings under the Litkenhous Difference by Score System for 1941.

The team played its home games at Hayward Field in Eugene, Oregon.

== Schedule ==
Date	Opponent	Rank	Site	Result	Attendance	Source
September 27	at Stanford		Stanford Stadium; Stanford, CA	L 15–19	35,000	
October 3	Idaho		Hayward Field; Eugene, OR	W 21–7	5,000	
October 11	at USC		Los Angeles Memorial Coliseum; Los Angeles, CA	W 20–6	42,000	
October 18	California		Multnomah Stadium; Portland, OR	W 19–7	22,000	
October 25	at UCLA	No. 16	Los Angeles Memorial Coliseum; Los Angeles, CA	L 7–14	30,000	
November 1	Washington State		Hayward Field; Eugene, OR	L 0–13	5,000	
November 11	Santa Clara		Multnomah Stadium; Portland, OR	W 21–19	15,854	
November 22	at No. 20 Washington		Husky Stadium; Seattle, WA (rivalry)	W 19–16	30,000	
November 29	No. 17 Oregon State		Hayward Field; Eugene, OR (Civil War)	L 7–12	20,500	
December 6	at No. 10 Texas*		War Memorial Stadium; Austin, TX	L 7–71	27,000	
*Non-conference game; Rankings from AP Poll released prior to the game

== Rankings ==
Ranking movements Legend: ██ Increase in ranking ██ Decrease in ranking — = Not ranked
	Week							
Poll	1	2	3	4	5	6	7	Final
AP	—	16	—	—	—	—	—	—
