= Don Durdan =

American football and basketball player (1920–1971)

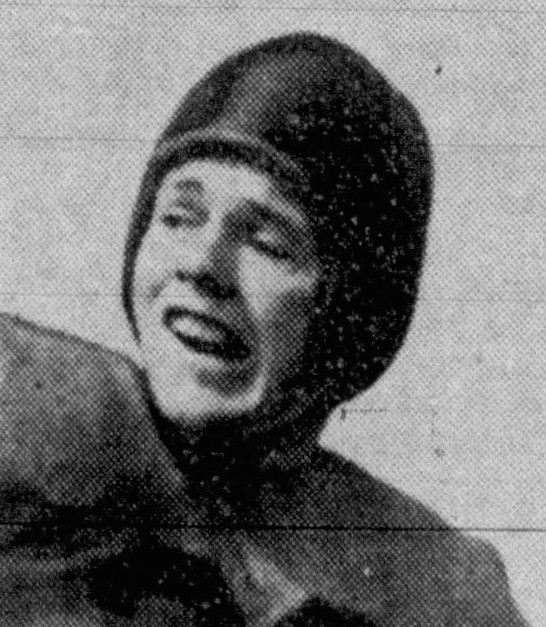
- Durdan, circa 1942

No. 93
- Positions: Half back, defensive back

Personal information
- Born: September 21, 1920; Arcata, California, U.S.
- Died: June 28, 1971 (aged 50); Corvallis, Oregon, U.S.
- Listed height: 5 ft 9 in (1.75 m)
- Listed weight: 175 lb (79 kg)

Career information
- High school: Eureka (Eureka, California)
- College: Oregon State
- NFL draft: 1943: undrafted

Career history
- San Francisco 49ers (1946–1947)

Awards and highlights
- Second-team All-PCC (1941); 1942 Rose Bowl MVP; Oregon Sports Hall of Fame, 1981; Rose Bowl Hall of Fame, 1988; Oregon State University Sports Hall of Fame, 1988

Career NFL statistics
- Rushing att–yards: 33–134
- Receptions–yards: 2–27
- Touchdowns: 1

Donald Edgar Durdan (September 21, 1920 – June 28, 1971) was an American professional football and basketball player. He played collegiately for the Oregon State Beavers.

== Early life ==
Durdan was born in Arcata, California and attended Eureka High School, where he played running back on the high school football team. In 1935, Durdan's team was not only undefeated, but they did not allow their opponents to score a single point.

Durdan went on to Oregon State University, where he started in baseball, basketball, and football, and was a member of Pacific Coast Conference championship teams in each sport. He was named an All-American in basketball in his senior year of 1943.

== Rose Bowl MVP ==
In 1941, the Beavers football team won the Pacific Coast Conference and a berth in the 1942 Rose Bowl against the undefeated Duke Blue Devils. With the United States' entry into World War II, concern about a Japanese attack on the West Coast brought a relocation of the game to Duke's home stadium in Durham, North Carolina. In spite of the fact that Duke was favored by two touchdowns, the Beavers pulled off a major upset, winning 20–16. Durdan, who showed his all-around skill by rushing for 54 yards and a touchdown, passing, and punting, was named the game's most valuable player. This remains the Beavers' only Rose Bowl victory.

== Professional career ==
Durdan served in the United States Navy during World War II. After the war, Durdan signed with the San Francisco 49ers in 1946, where he played halfback as well as defensive back for one full season and part of a second in 1947.

In addition to playing professional football, Durdan also played professional basketball for the Portland Indians of the Pacific Coast Professional Basketball League. The league lasted just two seasons (1946–47 and 1947–48), but Durdan's Indians won the best-of-five league championship in 1948 over the rival Seattle Athletics.

== Personal ==
In 1946, Durdan married Maxine DeMoss, sister of Oregon golf champion Grace DeMoss (another DeMoss sister married Durdan's Rose Bowl teammate Quentin Greenough). Following his sports career, Durdan became a funeral director in his wife's family's funeral home business in Corvallis, Oregon. He died in Corvallis in 1971. He was inducted into the Oregon Sports Hall of Fame in 1981, and in 1988, to both the Rose Bowl Hall of Fame and the Oregon State University Sports Hall of Fame.
