= 1941 Montana Grizzlies football team =

American college football season

1941 Montana Grizzlies football
- Conference: Pacific Coast Conference
- Record: 6–3 (1–3 PCC)
- Head coach: Doug Fessenden (7th season)
- Home stadium: Dornblaser Field

1941 Pacific Coast Conference football standings
	Conf.					Overall
Team	W		L		T	W		L		T
No. 12 Oregon State $	7	–	2	–	0	8	–	2	–	0
Washington	5	–	3	–	0	5	–	4	–	0
No. 19 Washington State	5	–	3	–	0	6	–	4	–	0
Stanford	4	–	3	–	0	6	–	3	–	0
Oregon	4	–	4	–	0	5	–	5	–	0
UCLA	3	–	4	–	1	5	–	5	–	1
California	3	–	4	–	0	4	–	5	–	0
USC	2	–	4	–	1	2	–	6	–	1
Montana	1	–	3	–	0	6	–	3	–	0
Idaho	0	–	4	–	0	4	–	5	–	0
$ – Conference champion; Rankings from AP Poll

The 1941 Montana Grizzlies football team was an American football team that represented the University of Montana as a member of the Pacific Coast Conference (PCC) during the 1941 college football season. In their seventh year under head coach Doug Fessenden, the Grizzlies compiled a 6–3 record (1–3 against PCC opponents) and outscored opponents by a total of 119 to 94. The team played its home games at Dornblaser Field in Missoula, Montana.

Montana was ranked at No. 117 (out of 681 teams) in the final rankings under the Litkenhous Difference by Score System for 1941.

== Schedule ==
Date	Opponent	Site	Result	Attendance	Source
September 26	at BYU*	Cougar Stadium; Provo, UT	W 20–7	5,500	
October 4	North Dakota Agricultural*	Dornblaser Field; Missoula, MT	W 27–0	> 3,000	
October 10	at UCLA	Los Angeles Memorial Coliseum; Los Angeles, CA	L 7–14	20,000	
October 18	Gonzaga*	Dornblaser Field; Missoula, MT	W 13–6		
October 25	vs. Montana State*	Butte High Stadium; Butte, MT (rivalry)	W 23–13	> 6,000	
November 1	at Washington	Husky Stadium; Seattle, WA	L 0–21	20,000	
November 8	North Dakota*^{†}	Dornblaser Field; Missoula, MT	W 13–6		
November 15	at Idaho	Neale Stadium; Moscow, ID (rivalry)	W 16–0		
November 22	at Oregon State	Multnomah Stadium; Portland, OR	L 0–27	4,000	
*Non-conference game; ^{†}Homecoming
