= 1941 Idaho Vandals football team =

American college football season

1941 Idaho Vandals football
- Conference: Pacific Coast Conference
- Record: 4–5 (0–4 PCC)
- Head coach: Francis Schmidt (1st season)
- Home stadium: Neale Stadium

1941 Pacific Coast Conference football standings
	Conf.					Overall
Team	W		L		T	W		L		T
No. 12 Oregon State $	7	–	2	–	0	8	–	2	–	0
Washington	5	–	3	–	0	5	–	4	–	0
No. 19 Washington State	5	–	3	–	0	6	–	4	–	0
Stanford	4	–	3	–	0	6	–	3	–	0
Oregon	4	–	4	–	0	5	–	5	–	0
UCLA	3	–	4	–	1	5	–	5	–	1
California	3	–	4	–	0	4	–	5	–	0
USC	2	–	4	–	1	2	–	6	–	1
Montana	1	–	3	–	0	6	–	3	–	0
Idaho	0	–	4	–	0	4	–	5	–	0
$ – Conference champion; Rankings from AP Poll

The 1941 Idaho Vandals football team represented the University of Idaho in the 1941 college football season. The Vandals were led by first-year head coach Francis Schmidt, and were members of the Pacific Coast Conference.

Idaho was ranked at No. 103 (out of 681 teams) in the final rankings under the Litkenhous Difference by Score System for 1941.

Home games were played on campus in Moscow at Neale Stadium, with one game in Boise at Public School Field.

Schmidt, age 55, was a longtime college football head coach, most recently in the Big Ten Conference at Ohio State University (1934–1940), where he was followed by a 32-year-old high school coach named Paul Brown. Schmidt was hired at Idaho in March to succeed six-year head coach Ted Bank.

The Vandals were 4–5 overall in 1941 and 0–4 in conference play. They did not play any of the four teams from California teams or Washington.

Idaho opened with a homecoming loss to Utah and then played Friday night road games in consecutive weeks, their first under the lights in nine years (last at UCLA in 1932). They split these two, both with the same score (21–7), losing at Oregon and winning at Gonzaga. Not known at the time, it was the last-ever game against Gonzaga, as the Bulldogs put their football program on hold after this season due to World War II and never resumed it. The teams had played nearly every year for three decades.

In the Battle of the Palouse with neighbor Washington State, the Vandals suffered a fourteenth straight loss, falling 26–0 at Rogers Field in Pullman on November 8. Idaho's most recent win in the series was a sixteen years earlier in 1925 and the next was thirteen years away, in 1954.

The next week, Idaho's losing streak to Montana in the Little Brown Stein rivalry was extended to a rare three years with a 16-point shutout at Moscow. While Montana was in the PCC (through 1949), the loser of the game was frequently last in the conference standings. The final game seven days later was also a shutout, a 39–0 victory over Montana State in Boise.

== Schedule ==
Date	Time	Opponent	Site	Result	Attendance	Source
September 26	2:00 pm	Utah*^{†}	Neale Stadium; Moscow, ID	L 7–26	9,500	
October 3	8:00 pm	at Oregon	Hayward Field; Eugene, OR	L 7–21	5,000	
October 10	8:00 pm	at Gonzaga*	Gonzaga Stadium; Spokane, WA (rivalry)	W 21–7	8,000	
October 18	1:00 pm	at Utah State*	old Romney Stadium; Logan, UT	W 16–0	5,000	
October 25	2:00 pm	Willamette*	Neale Stadium; Moscow, ID	W 33–6		
November 1	2:00 pm	at Oregon State	Bell Field; Corvallis, OR	L 0–33	5,000	
November 8	2:00 pm	at Washington State	Rogers Field; Pullman, WA (Battle of the Palouse)	L 0–26	9,000	
November 15	2:00 pm	Montana	Neale Stadium; Moscow, ID (Little Brown Stein)	L 0–16		
November 22	1:00 pm	Montana State*	Public School Field; Boise, ID	W 39–0	5,000	
*Non-conference game; ^{†}Homecoming; All times are in Pacific time

== Coaching staff ==
- Walt Price, line
- James A. Brown, freshmen

== All-conference ==
No Vandals were named to the All-Coast team; back Bill Micklich was honorable mention.
