= 1941 Washington Huskies football team =

American college football season

1941 Washington Huskies football
- Conference: Pacific Coast Conference
- Record: 5–4 (5–3 PCC)
- Head coach: Jimmy Phelan (12th season)
- Captain: None
- Home stadium: University of Washington Stadium

1941 Pacific Coast Conference football standings
| | Conf. | | | | | Overall |
| Team | W | | L | | T | W | | L | | T |
|---|---|---|---|---|---|---|---|---|---|---|
| No. 12 Oregon State $ | 7 | – | 2 | – | 0 | 8 | – | 2 | – | 0 |
| Washington | 5 | – | 3 | – | 0 | 5 | – | 4 | – | 0 |
| No. 19 Washington State | 5 | – | 3 | – | 0 | 6 | – | 4 | – | 0 |
| Stanford | 4 | – | 3 | – | 0 | 6 | – | 3 | – | 0 |
| Oregon | 4 | – | 4 | – | 0 | 5 | – | 5 | – | 0 |
| UCLA | 3 | – | 4 | – | 1 | 5 | – | 5 | – | 1 |
| California | 3 | – | 4 | – | 0 | 4 | – | 5 | – | 0 |
| USC | 2 | – | 4 | – | 1 | 2 | – | 6 | – | 1 |
| Montana | 1 | – | 3 | – | 0 | 6 | – | 3 | – | 0 |
| Idaho | 0 | – | 4 | – | 0 | 4 | – | 5 | – | 0 |
$ – Conference champion; Rankings from AP Poll

The 1941 Washington Huskies football team was an American football team that represented the University of Washington during the 1941 college football season. In its 12th season under head coach Jimmy Phelan, the team compiled a 5–4 record, finished in second place in the Pacific Coast Conference, and outscored its opponents by a combined total of 120 to 94.

Washington was ranked at No. 26 (out of 681 teams) in the final rankings under the Litkenhous Difference by Score System for 1941.

After the season in mid-December, Phelan and his two assistants were fired. Assistant Ralph Welch was rehired as head coach for 1942.

== Schedule ==
| Date | Opponent | Rank | Site | Result | Attendance | Source |
|---|---|---|---|---|---|---|
| September 27 | Minnesota* | | University of Washington Stadium; Seattle, WA | L 6–14 | 43,000 | |
| October 4 | vs. Oregon State | | Multnomah Stadium; Portland, OR | L 6–9 | 15,000 | |
| October 11 | at Washington State | | Rogers Field; Pullman, WA (rivalry) | W 23–13 | 22,000 | |
| October 18 | UCLA | | University of Washington Stadium; Seattle, WA | W 14–7 | 18,000 | |
| October 25 | No. T–19 Stanford | | University of Washington Stadium; Seattle, WA | L 7–13 | 43,000 | |
| November 1 | Montana | | University of Washington Stadium; Seattle, WA | W 21–0 | 20,000 | |
| November 8 | at California | | California Memorial Stadium; Berkeley, CA | W 13–6 | 30,000 | |
| November 22 | Oregon | No. 20 | University of Washington Stadium; Seattle, WA (rivalry) | L 16–19 | 30,000 | |
| November 29 | at USC | | Los Angeles Memorial Coliseum; Los Angeles, CA | W 14–13 | 35,000 | |
*Non-conference game; Rankings from AP Poll released prior to the game

== Rankings ==
Ranking movements Legend: ██ Increase in ranking ██ Decrease in ranking — = Not ranked т = Tied with team above or below
| | Week | | | | | | | |
| Poll | 1 | 2 | 3 | 4 | 5 | 6 | 7 | Final |
|---|---|---|---|---|---|---|---|---|
| AP | — | — | — | — | — | 20т | — | — |

== NFL draft selections ==
Five University of Washington Huskies were selected in the 1942 NFL draft, which lasted 22 rounds with 200 selections.

| = Husky Hall of Fame |

| Player | Position | Round | Pick | NFL club |
| Ray Frankowski | Guard | 3 | 9 | Green Bay Packers |
| Earl Younglove | End | 6 | 3 | Philadelphia Eagles |
| Ernie Steele | Back | 10 | 1 | Pittsburgh Steelers |
| Jack Stackpool | Back | 10 | 3 | Philadelphia Eagles |
| Gene Conley | Back | 20 | 2 | Cleveland Rams |
