= 1941 USC Trojans football team =

American college football season

1941 USC Trojans football
- Conference: Pacific Coast Conference
- Record: 2–6–1 (2–4–1 PCC)
- Head coach: Sam Barry (1st season)
- Home stadium: Los Angeles Memorial Coliseum

1941 Pacific Coast Conference football standings
	Conf.					Overall
Team	W		L		T	W		L		T
No. 12 Oregon State $	7	–	2	–	0	8	–	2	–	0
Washington	5	–	3	–	0	5	–	4	–	0
No. 19 Washington State	5	–	3	–	0	6	–	4	–	0
Stanford	4	–	3	–	0	6	–	3	–	0
Oregon	4	–	4	–	0	5	–	5	–	0
UCLA	3	–	4	–	1	5	–	5	–	1
California	3	–	4	–	0	4	–	5	–	0
USC	2	–	4	–	1	2	–	6	–	1
Montana	1	–	3	–	0	6	–	3	–	0
Idaho	0	–	4	–	0	4	–	5	–	0
$ – Conference champion; Rankings from AP Poll

The 1941 USC Trojans football team was an American football team that represented the University of Southern California as a member of the Pacific Coast Conference during the 1941 college football season. The team was led by first-year head coach Sam Barry who took over after Howard Jones died during the previous off-season. Barry also coached USC's basketball and baseball teams. The Trojans compiled a 2–6–1 record (2–4–1 against PCC opponents) and finished eighth out of ten in the conference.

USC was ranked at No. 64 (out of 681 teams) in the final rankings under the Litkenhous Difference by Score System for 1941.

== Schedule ==
Date	Opponent	Site	Result	Attendance	Source
September 27	Oregon State	Los Angeles Memorial Coliseum; Los Angeles, CA	W 13–7	50,000	
October 4	Ohio State*	Los Angeles Memorial Coliseum; Los Angeles, CA	L 0–33	65,000	
October 11	Oregon	Los Angeles Memorial Coliseum; Los Angeles, CA	L 6–20	42,000	
October 18	Washington State	Los Angeles Memorial Coliseum; Los Angeles, CA	W 7–6	40,000	
October 25	at California	Memorial Stadium; Berkeley, CA	L 0–14	30,000	
November 8	No. 9 Stanford	Los Angeles Memorial Coliseum; Los Angeles, CA (rivalry)	L 0–13	87,000	
November 22	at No. 4 Notre Dame*	Notre Dame Stadium; Notre Dame, IN (rivalry)	L 18–20	56,000	
November 29	Washington	Los Angeles Memorial Coliseum; Los Angeles, CA	L 13–14	35,000	
December 6	at UCLA^{†}	Los Angeles Memorial Coliseum; Los Angeles, CA (Victory Bell)	T 7–7	60,000	
*Non-conference game; ^{†}Homecoming; Rankings from AP Poll released prior to the game
