= 1941 Washington State Cougars football team =

American college football season

1941 Washington State Cougars football
- Conference: Pacific Coast Conference

Ranking
- AP: No. 19
- Record: 6–4 (5–3 PCC)
- Head coach: Babe Hollingbery (16th season)
- Captain: Joe Beckman
- Home stadium: Rogers Field

1941 Pacific Coast Conference football standings
	Conf.					Overall
Team	W		L		T	W		L		T
No. 12 Oregon State $	7	–	2	–	0	8	–	2	–	0
Washington	5	–	3	–	0	5	–	4	–	0
No. 19 Washington State	5	–	3	–	0	6	–	4	–	0
Stanford	4	–	3	–	0	6	–	3	–	0
Oregon	4	–	4	–	0	5	–	5	–	0
UCLA	3	–	4	–	1	5	–	5	–	1
California	3	–	4	–	0	4	–	5	–	0
USC	2	–	4	–	1	2	–	6	–	1
Montana	1	–	3	–	0	6	–	3	–	0
Idaho	0	–	4	–	0	4	–	5	–	0
$ – Conference champion; Rankings from AP Poll

The 1941 Washington State Cougars football team was an American football team that represented Washington State College as a member of the Pacific Coast Conference (PCC) during the 1941 college football season. Sixteenth-year head coach Babe Hollingbery led the team to a 6–4 record (5–3 in the PCC).

== Schedule ==
Date	Opponent	Rank	Site	Result	Attendance	Source
September 26	at UCLA		Los Angeles Memorial Coliseum; Los Angeles, CA	L 6–7	45,000	
October 4	California		Rogers Field; Pullman, WA	W 13–6	5,000	
October 11	Washington		Rogers Field; Pullman, WA (rivalry)	L 13–23	22,000	
October 18	at USC		Los Angeles Memorial Coliseum; Los Angeles, CA	L 6–7	40,000	
October 25	No. 18 Oregon State		Rogers Field; Pullman, WA	W 7–0	10,000	
November 1	at Oregon		Hayward Field; Eugene, OR	W 13–0	5,000	
November 8	Idaho		Rogers Field; Pullman, WA (Battle of the Palouse)	W 26–0	9,000	
November 15	at No. 6 Stanford		Stanford Stadium; Stanford, CA	W 14–13	45,000	
November 22	at Gonzaga*		Gonzaga Stadium; Spokane, WA	W 59–0	6,000	
December 6	vs. No. 9 Texas A&M*	No. 19	Tacoma Stadium; Tacoma, WA (Evergreen Bowl)	L 0–7	26,000	
*Non-conference game; Rankings from AP Poll released prior to the game

== Rankings ==
Ranking movements Legend: ██ Increase in ranking ██ Decrease in ranking — = Not ranked
	Week							
Poll	1	2	3	4	5	6	7	Final
AP	—	—	—	—	—	—	—	19
