= 1941 Texas Longhorns football team =

American college football season

1941 Texas Longhorns football
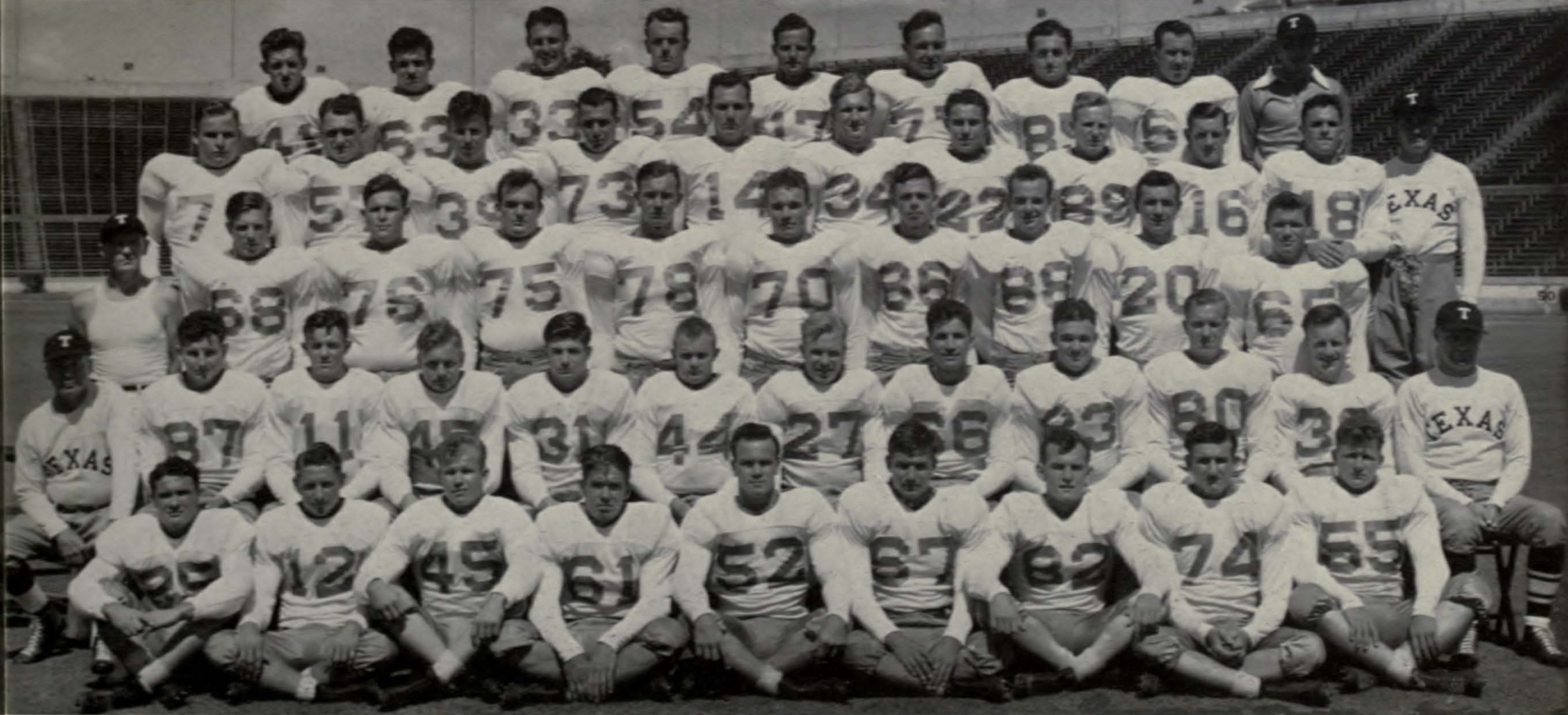

National champion (Berryman QPRS, James Howell, Williamson System)
- Conference: Southwest Conference

Ranking
- AP: No. 4
- Record: 8–1–1 (4–1–1 SWC)
- Head coach: Dana X. Bible (5th season)
- Home stadium: War Memorial Stadium

1941 Southwest Conference football standings
	Conf.					Overall
Team	W		L		T	W		L		T
No. 9 Texas A&M $	5	–	1	–	0	9	–	2	–	0
No. 4 Texas	4	–	1	–	1	8	–	1	–	1
TCU	4	–	1	–	1	7	–	3	–	1
Rice	3	–	2	–	1	6	–	3	–	1
SMU	2	–	4	–	0	5	–	5	–	0
Baylor	1	–	4	–	1	3	–	6	–	1
Arkansas	0	–	6	–	0	3	–	7	–	0
$ – Conference champion; Rankings from AP Poll

The 1941 Texas Longhorns football team was an American football team that represented the University of Texas as a member of the Southwest Conference during the 1941 college football season. In their fifth year under head coach Dana X. Bible, the Longhorns compiled an 8–1–1 record (4–1–1 against conference opponents), were ranked No. 4 in the final AP Poll, and outscored their opponents by a total of 338 to 55.

Four Longhorns were selected as first-team players on the 1941 All-Southwest Conference football team: fullback Pete Layden, halfback Jack Crain, end Malcolm Kutner, and guard Chal Daniel. Kutner was also selected by the Associated Press, International News Service and Collier's as a first-team All-American and was later inducted into the College Football Hall of Fame.

On October 27, 1941, the Longhorns became the first Texas Longhorns football team to reach No. 1 in the AP Poll. They were recognized as national champions by Berryman QPRS, James Howell, and the Williamson System.

== Schedule ==
Date	Opponent	Rank	Site	Result	Attendance	Source
September 27	at Colorado*		Colorado Stadium; Boulder, CO	W 34–6	15,000	
October 4	LSU*		Memorial Stadium; Austin, TX	W 34–0	18,000	
October 11	vs. Oklahoma*		Cotton Bowl; Dallas, TX (rivalry)	W 40–7	42,000	
October 18	Arkansas	No. 2	Memorial Stadium; Austin, TX (rivalry)	W 48–14	23,000	
October 25	Rice	No. 2	Memorial Stadium; Austin, TX (rivalry)	W 40–0	42,000	
November 1	at No. 20 SMU	No. 1	Cotton Bowl; Dallas, TX	W 34–0	23,000	
November 8	at Baylor	No. 1	Waco Stadium; Waco, TX (rivalry)	T 7–7		
November 15	TCU	No. 2	Memorial Stadium; Austin, TX (rivalry)	L 7–14	23,000	
November 27	at No. 2 Texas A&M	No. 10	Kyle Field; College Station, TX (rivalry)	W 23–0	40,000	
December 6	Oregon*	No. 4	Memorial Stadium; Austin, TX	W 71–7	27,000	
*Non-conference game; Rankings from AP Poll released prior to the game

== Personnel ==
=== Coaching staff ===
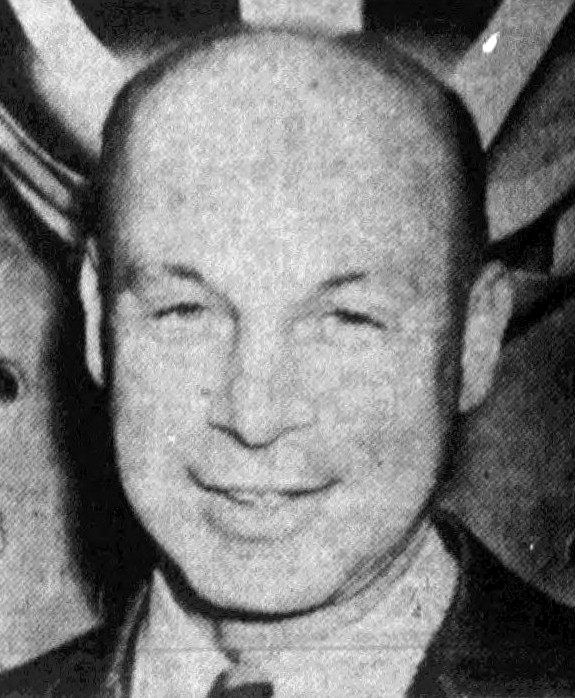
Head coach Dana X. Bible in 1941.

Name	Title	Years at Texas	Alma mater
Dana X. Bible	Head Coach	1937–1946	Carson-Newman
Blair Cherry	Assistant Coach	1937–1946, 1947-50 (HC)	TCU
Bully Gilstrap	Assistant Coach	1937–1956	Texas
Jack Gray	Assistant Coach	1935-1941, 1946-49	Texas
Clyde Littlefield	Assistant Coach	1920–1948 (Note: Littlefield was an assistant football coach from 1920-26 then from 1936-42 and again from 1945-48. In between he also served as head coach from 1927-1933. Outside of football he was head coach of Texas' Track team from 1920-61.)	Texas
Ed Price	Assistant Coach	1936–1941, 1946-50, 1951-56 (HC)	Texas

=== Roster ===
1941 Texas Longhorns football team roster
Players
Backfield

Pos.	#	Name	Class
HB	11	Noble Doss	Sr
HB	12	John Max Minor	So
HB	16	Fritz Lobpries	So
HB	17	Kenneth Matthews	So
QB	20	Walter Heap	So
QB	27	Vernon Martin	Jr
FB	30	Rube Lee Harkins	Sr
FB	31	Pete Layden	Sr
FB	33	Roy McKay	So
FB	39	Lew Mayne	So
HB	41	Walton Roberts	So
HB	44	Jack Crain	Sr
HB	45	Jackie Field	So
HB	47	Spec Sanders	Jr

Linemen

Pos.	#	Name	Class
C	52	Jack Sachse	So
C	54	Henry Harkins	So
G	60	Jack Freeman	Jr
G	62	Woodrow Johnson	So
G	63	William "Spot" Collins	So
G	65	Buddy Jungmichel	Jr
G	66	Chal Daniel	Sr
G	67	Harold Fischer	So
C	68	Audrey Gill	So
OT	70	Stanley Mauldin	Jr
OT	71	Henry Harris	So
OT	73	George Watkins	So
OT	75	Donald "Bo" Cohenour	Jr
OT	76	Derwood Peveto	Jr
OT	77	Zuehl "Bud" Conoly	So
OT	78	Julian Garrett	Jr
E	80	Malcolm Kutner	Sr
E	82	Joe Parker	So
E	83	Mike Sweeney	Sr
E	86	Jack West	So
E	87	Preston Flanagan	Jr
E	88	Wallace Scott	So
E	89	Joe Schwarting	So

=== Depth chart ===
In 1941 the Longhorns ran a single-wing offense under coach Dana X. Bible. The change in rules allowing free substitution prior to the year allowed coach Bible to sub in entire units throughout the game, and in games where the Horns were comfortably in the lead he would typically rest the starters by substituting in the entire 2nd or 3rd string teams.

LE
Preston Flanagan
Mike Sweeney
Joe Parker
Joe Schwarting

LT	LG	C	RG	RT
Bo Cohenour	Buddy Jungmichel	Henry Harkins	Chal Daniel	Julian Garrett
George Watkins	Spot Collins	Audrey Gill	"Woody" Johnson	Zuehl Conoly
Stanley Mauldin	Harold Fischer	Jack Sachse	Jack Freeman	Derwood Peveto
-	-	-	-	Henry Harris

RE
Malcolm Kutner
Jack West
Wallace Scott
-

QB
Vernon Martin
Walter Heap
-
-

RHB
Noble Doss
Fritz Lobpries
John Max Minor
Ken Matthews

LHB
Jack Crain
Spec Sanders
Walton Roberts
Jackie Field

FB
Pete Layden
Rube Lee Harkins
Lew Mayne
Roy McKay

== Rankings ==
Ranking movements Legend: ██ Increase in ranking ██ Decrease in ranking т = Tied with team above or below ( ) = First-place votes
	Week							
Poll	1	2	3	4	5	6	7	Final
AP	2 (30)	2 (33)	1т (53)	1 (73.5)	2 (4)	9	10	4 (1)
