= Jack Crain =

American football player and politician (1920–1994)

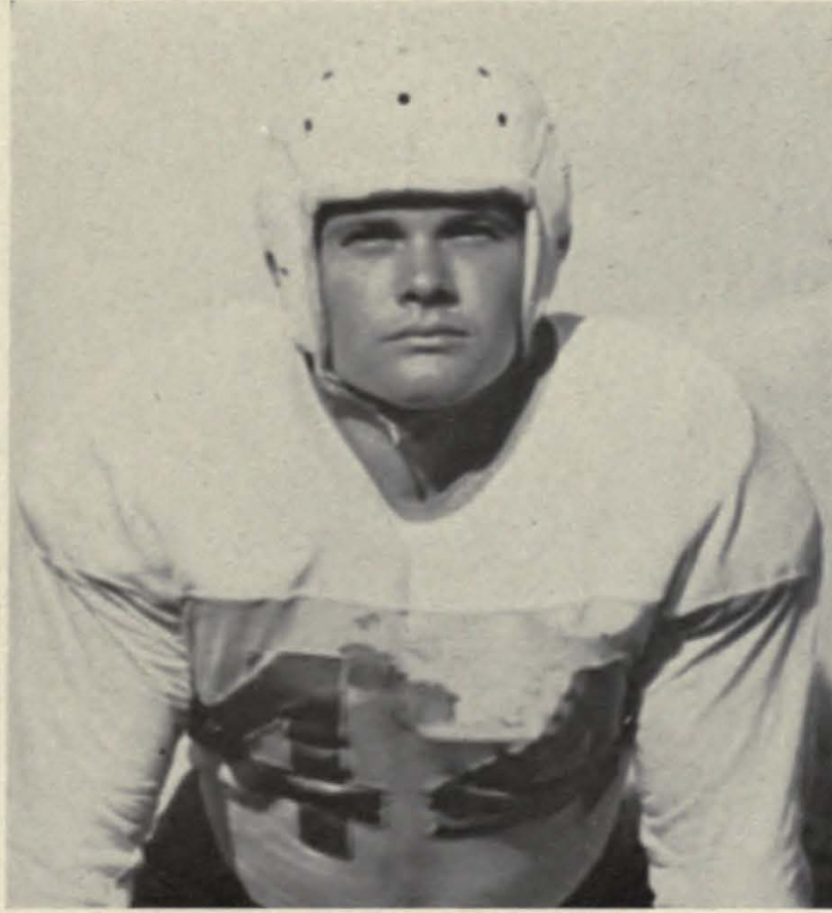
- Crain with the Longhorns in 1941.

Profile
- Positions: Halfback, Defensive Back
- Class: 1941

Personal information
- Born: January 7, 1920; Nocona, Texas, U.S.
- Died: October 22, 1994 (aged 74); Nocona, Texas, U.S.
- Listed height: 5 ft 7 in (1.70 m)
- Listed weight: 155 lb (70 kg)

Career information
- High school: Nocona
- College: Texas Longhorns (1938–1940)

Awards and highlights
- Second-team All-American (1941); Third-team All-American (1939); 2× first-team All-SWC (1939, 1941)

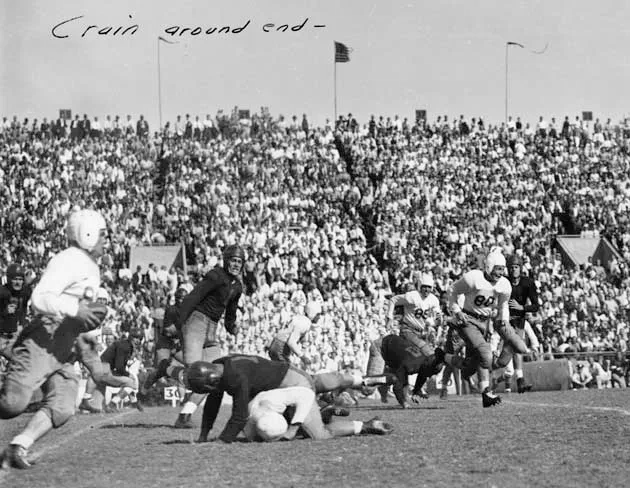
Jack Crain (bottom left) scoring the walk-off touchdown against Arkansas in 1939.

Jack Crain (January 7, 1920 – October 22, 1994) was a two-time All-American football player for the University of Texas at Austin who later served three terms in the Texas House of Representatives. He was a Heisman Trophy finalist and an All Southwest Conference player in 1939 and 1940 who set several school records, some of which still stand.

== High school ==
Crain grew up in Nocona, Texas, where he was known as the Nocona Nugget. and went to Nocona High School On the high school football in 1937, he scored 258 points, which was the 2nd most in the state that year; and his team won a Class B regional title. Crain's football talents were gaining attention in the media; consequently, he was selected to play in the 1938 Oil Bowl (high school). Fifty-six years later, he would be inducted in the Oil Bowl (high school) Hall of Fame. Jack Crain Football Stadium of the Nocona Independent School District is now named for him.

In 1984, Crain was inducted into the Texas High School Sports Hall of Fame.

== College career ==
Jack (Jackrabbit) Crain played college football at the University of Texas at Austin from 1939-1941. Coach Dana X. Bible thought that he helped lay the foundation for the Longhorn's rise from mediocrity to preeminence in the late 1930s.

In 1939, he led the Longhorns in scoring with 56 points and rushing with 610 yards, including two 100 yard rushing games. One 100-yard game was for 142 yards, against Oklahoma, which was the 2nd most rushing yards in a game in school history (behind Lee Barrell's 162 yards in 1914) and another for 104 yards against Florida. In the game between the Longhorns and Razorbacks in October 1939, Crain an unknown sophomore, ran a quick kick back to help UT later score from seven yards out. Late in the game with only under 30 seconds to play, Crain caught a flip-out pass and ran 67 yards untouched and scored a touchdown to tie the game at 13–13. Finally, as the clock ran out Crain kicked the extra point himself for the 14–13 win. This game became known as the Renaissance Game in Texas football history and the win is credited for revitalizing the football program once again.

In 1940, he again had 100-yard rushing game against Oklahoma, putting up 124 rushing yards in that game. Crain also played defensive back and in 1940, he and Noble Doss each had 7 interceptions setting a record that would last until it was broken by Earl Thomas in 2009. He returned those interceptions for a combined 160 yards, which is still the school record for interception return yards in a season.

In 1941, he again led the Longhorns in scoring, this time with 92 points, the 2nd most in school history at the time. Crain topped his single-game rushing mark by rushing for 144 yards, again against Oklahoma - making him the only Longhorn to get 100-yards or more in 3 games against the Sooners. Crain was Texas' first top 10 Heisman finalist when he received enough votes to come in 10th place. That season he helped the Longhorns to their first ever #1 ranking in the polls and to a #4 finish. After the season was over he came in 10th in Heisman Trophy voting, the first Longhorn finalist.

He finished his career as the school's all-time leading rusher with 1,436 career rushing yards, a record that wouldn't be broken until Byron Townsend topped it in 1951; the school's all-time leading scorer with 180 points, a record that wouldn't be broken until the 1970's by Earl Campbell and the all-time leader in touchdowns which was broken by Chris Gilbert in 1968.

In December 1941, he led the South to victory in the annual Blue–Gray Football Classic, in that game he had two long punt returns of 22 and 35 yards to set up scores, as well as a 18 yard touchdown pass. And in the summer of 1942, he accepted an invitation to play in the Chicago Charities College All-Star Game against the Chicago Bears.

In 1962, Crain was inducted into the Texas Longhorn's Hall of Honor.

== After college ==
Crain was drafted by the Chicago Cardinals in the 17th Round of the 1942 NFL draft. He joined the U.S. Navy as an officer in World War II and went to aviation school in Athens, GA instead. He spent time recruiting Naval Air Cadets.

While in the Navy, he played football, along with Noble Doss on the Navy Preflight School football team - the Georgia Skycrackers. They upset Penn in 1942. In 1945 he was playing for the Pacific Fleet All-Stars.

Following the war, he was signed by the Miami Seahawks of the All-America Football Conference on July 4, 1946. He was with the team through October 1946, but there is no indication that he ever took the field and he has no stats.

In March 1947 he was signed by the Chicago Cardinals, but later released.

He returned to Nocona, where he lived for the rest of his life. In 1960 he leveraged his celebrity status to be elected to the Texas House of Representatives from District 61 and he continued to serve until 1966 when he retired to devote more time to his family.

In 1978, his wife, Jean Crain, was killed when a building in downtown Nocona collapsed from a heavy accumulation of snow. This event provided the impetus for Crain to found a church called Jean's Men's Bible Class. This nondenominational church, named after his wife, is still active today.

Crain died October 22, 1994, at the age of 74.

== Legacy ==
Nocona High School's stadium is named Jack Crain Stadium in his honor.
