= 1941 Rice Owls football team =

American college football season

1941 Rice Owls football
- Conference: Southwest Conference
- Record: 6–3–1 (3–2–1 SWC)
- Head coach: Jess Neely (2nd season)
- Home stadium: Rice Field

1941 Southwest Conference football standings
	Conf.					Overall
Team	W		L		T	W		L		T
No. 9 Texas A&M $	5	–	1	–	0	9	–	2	–	0
No. 4 Texas	4	–	1	–	1	8	–	1	–	1
TCU	4	–	1	–	1	7	–	3	–	1
Rice	3	–	2	–	1	6	–	3	–	1
SMU	2	–	4	–	0	5	–	5	–	0
Baylor	1	–	4	–	1	3	–	6	–	1
Arkansas	0	–	6	–	0	3	–	7	–	0
$ – Conference champion; Rankings from AP Poll

The 1941 Rice Owls football team was an American football team that represented Rice Institute as a member of the Southwest Conference (SWC) during the 1941 college football season. In its second season under head coach Jess Neely, the team compiled a 6–3–1 record (3–2–1 against SWC opponents) and was outscored by a total of 167 to 121. The team played its home games at Rice Field in Houston.

Guard Art Goforth was selected by the Associated Press as a first-team player on the 1941 All-Southwest Conference football team.

== Schedule ==
Date	Opponent	Rank	Site	Result	Attendance	Source
October 4	Sam Houston State*		Rice Field; Houston, TX	W 42–0	14,000	
October 11	Tulane*		Rice Field; Houston, TX	W 10–9	25,000	
October 18	at LSU	No. 12	Tiger Stadium; Baton Rouge, LA	L 0–27	25,000	
October 25	at No. 2 Texas		Memorial Stadium; Austin, TX (rivalry)	L 0–40	42,000	
November 1	Centenary*		Rice Field; Houston, TX	W 54–0		
November 8	Arkansas		Rice Field; Houston, TX	W 21–12	15,000	
November 15	No. 4 Texas A&M		Rice Field; Houston, TX	L 6–19		
November 22	at No. 19 TCU		Amon G. Carter Stadium; Fort Worth, TX	T 0–0	10,000	
November 29	Baylor		Rice Field; Houston, TX	W 28–14	14,000	
December 6	at SMU		Ownby Stadium; University Park, TX (rivalry)	W 6–0	10,000	
*Non-conference game; Rankings from AP Poll released prior to the game

== Rankings ==
Ranking movements Legend: ██ Increase in ranking ██ Decrease in ranking — = Not ranked
	Week							
Poll	1	2	3	4	5	6	7	Final
AP	12	—	—	—	—	—	—	—
