= 1941 Arkansas Razorbacks football team =

American college football season

1941 Arkansas Razorbacks football
- Conference: Southwest Conference
- Record: 3–7 (0–6 SWC)
- Head coach: Fred Thomsen (13th season)
- Captain: Daryl Cato
- Home stadium: Razorback Stadium, Quigley Stadium

1941 Southwest Conference football standings
| | Conf. | | | | | Overall |
| Team | W | | L | | T | W | | L | | T |
|---|---|---|---|---|---|---|---|---|---|---|
| No. 9 Texas A&M $ | 5 | – | 1 | – | 0 | 9 | – | 2 | – | 0 |
| No. 4 Texas | 4 | – | 1 | – | 1 | 8 | – | 1 | – | 1 |
| TCU | 4 | – | 1 | – | 1 | 7 | – | 3 | – | 1 |
| Rice | 3 | – | 2 | – | 1 | 6 | – | 3 | – | 1 |
| SMU | 2 | – | 4 | – | 0 | 5 | – | 5 | – | 0 |
| Baylor | 1 | – | 4 | – | 1 | 3 | – | 6 | – | 1 |
| Arkansas | 0 | – | 6 | – | 0 | 3 | – | 7 | – | 0 |
$ – Conference champion; Rankings from AP Poll

The 1941 Arkansas Razorbacks football team represented the University of Arkansas in the Southwest Conference (SWC) during the 1941 college football season. In their 13th and final year under head coach Fred Thomsen, the Razorbacks compiled a 3–7 record (0–6 against SWC opponents), finished in last place in the SWC, and were outscored by their opponents by a combined total of 149 to 118.

Arkansas was ranked at No. 49 (out of 681 teams) in the final rankings under the Litkenhous Difference by Score System for 1941.

== Schedule ==
| Date | Opponent | Site | Result | Attendance | Source |
|---|---|---|---|---|---|
| September 27 | Central State (OK)* | Razorback Stadium; Fayetteville, AR | W 56–0 | | |
| October 4 | TCU | Razorback Stadium; Fayetteville, AR | L 0–9 | 6,000 | |
| October 11 | at Baylor | Waco Stadium; Waco, TX | L 7–20 | | |
| October 18 | at No. 2 Texas | Memorial Stadium; Austin, TX (rivalry) | L 14–48 | 23,000 | |
| October 24 | at Detroit* | University of Detroit Stadium; Detroit, MI | W 9–6 | 21,202 | |
| November 1 | No. 5 Texas A&M | Quigley Stadium; Little Rock, AR (rivalry) | L 0–7 | 9,762 | |
| November 8 | at Rice | Rice Field; Houston, TX | L 12–21 | 15,000 | |
| November 15 | SMU^{†} | Razorback Stadium; Fayetteville, AR | L 7–14 | 9,000 | |
| November 22 | vs. No. 15 Ole Miss* | Crump Stadium; Memphis, TN (rivalry) | L 0–18 | 10,000 | |
| November 27 | at Tulsa* | Skelly Field; Tulsa, OK | W 13–6 | 16,000–17,000 | |
*Non-conference game; ^{†}Homecoming; Rankings from AP Poll released prior to the game
