= 1941 SMU Mustangs football team =

American college football season

1941 SMU Mustangs football
- Conference: Southwest Conference
- Record: 5–5 (2–4 SWC)
- Head coach: Matty Bell (7th season)
- Captains: J. Ted Ramsey; Horace Young
- Home stadium: Ownby Stadium

1941 Southwest Conference football standings
	Conf.					Overall
Team	W		L		T	W		L		T
No. 9 Texas A&M $	5	–	1	–	0	9	–	2	–	0
No. 4 Texas	4	–	1	–	1	8	–	1	–	1
TCU	4	–	1	–	1	7	–	3	–	1
Rice	3	–	2	–	1	6	–	3	–	1
SMU	2	–	4	–	0	5	–	5	–	0
Baylor	1	–	4	–	1	3	–	6	–	1
Arkansas	0	–	6	–	0	3	–	7	–	0
$ – Conference champion; Rankings from AP Poll

The 1941 SMU Mustangs football team was an American football team that represented Southern Methodist University (SMU) as a member of the Southwest Conference (SWC) during the 1941 college football season. In their seventh season under head coach Matty Bell, the Mustangs compiled a 5–5 record (2–4 against conference opponents) and outscored opponents by a total of 169 to 106.

Fullback Preston Johnson was selected by both the Associated Press and the United Press as a first-team player on the 1941 All-Southwest Conference football team.

SMU was ranked at No. 24 (out of 681 teams) in the final rankings under the Litkenhous Difference by Score System for 1941.

The team played its home games at Ownby Stadium in the University Park suburb of Dallas.

== Schedule ==
Date	Opponent	Rank	Site	Result	Attendance	Source
September 27	North Texas State Teachers*		Ownby Stadium; University Park, TX (rivalry)	W 54–0	12,000	
October 4	at Fordham*		Polo Grounds; New York, NY	L 10–16	28,500	
October 11	vs. Pacific (CA)*		Tyler, TX (Rose Festival game)	W 34–0	12,500	
October 18	at Auburn*		Legion Field; Birmingham, AL	W 20–7	12,000	
November 1	No. 1 Texas	No. 20	Cotton Bowl; Dallas, TX	L 0–34	23,000	
November 8	at No. 5 Texas A&M		Kyle Field; College Station, TX	L 10–21	10,000	
November 15	at Arkansas		Razorback Stadium; Fayetteville, AR	W 14–7	9,000	
November 22	Baylor		Ownby Stadium; University Park, TX	W 14–0	10,000	
November 29	at TCU		Amon G. Carter Stadium; Fort Worth, TX (rivalry)	L 13–15		
December 6	Rice		Ownby Stadium; University Park, TX (rivalry)	L 0–6	10,000	
*Non-conference game; Rankings from AP Poll released prior to the game

== Rankings ==
Ranking movements Legend: ██ Increase in ranking ██ Decrease in ranking — = Not ranked
	Week							
Poll	1	2	3	4	5	6	7	Final
AP	—	—	20	—	—	—	—	—
