= 1941 Baylor Bears football team =

American college football season

1941 Baylor Bears football
- Conference: Southwest Conference
- Record: 3–6–1 (1–4–1 SWC)
- Head coach: Frank Kimbrough (1st season)
- Captain: Jack W. Wilson
- Home stadium: Waco Stadium

1941 Southwest Conference football standings
	Conf.					Overall
Team	W		L		T	W		L		T
No. 9 Texas A&M $	5	–	1	–	0	9	–	2	–	0
No. 4 Texas	4	–	1	–	1	8	–	1	–	1
TCU	4	–	1	–	1	7	–	3	–	1
Rice	3	–	2	–	1	6	–	3	–	1
SMU	2	–	4	–	0	5	–	5	–	0
Baylor	1	–	4	–	1	3	–	6	–	1
Arkansas	0	–	6	–	0	3	–	7	–	0
$ – Conference champion; Rankings from AP Poll

The 1941 Baylor Bears football team represented Baylor University in the Southwest Conference (SWC) during the 1941 college football season. In their first season under head coach Frank Kimbrough, the Bears compiled a 3–6–1 record (1–4–1 against conference opponents), finished in sixth place in the conference, and were outscored by opponents by a combined total of 161 to 106.

Baylor was ranked at No. 55 (out of 681 teams) in the final rankings under the Litkenhous Difference by Score System for 1941.

The team played its home games at Waco Stadium in Waco, Texas. Jack W.Wilson was the team captain.

== Schedule ==
Date	Opponent	Site	Result	Attendance	Source
September 27	Hardin–Simmons*	Waco Stadium; Waco, TX	W 20–0		
October 4	at Denver*	DU Stadium; Denver, CO	W 14–0		
October 11	Arkansas	Waco Stadium; Waco, TX	W 20–7		
October 18	at Villanova*	Shibe Park; Philadelphia, PA	L 6–14	31,360	
October 25	at No. 9 Texas A&M	Kyle Field; College Station, TX (rivalry)	L 0–48		
November 1	TCU^{†}	Waco Stadium; Waco, TX (rivalry)	L 12–23		
November 8	No. 1 Texas	Waco Stadium; Waco, TX (rivalry)	T 7–7		
November 15	at Tulsa*	Skelly Field; Tulsa, OK	L 13–20	14,000	
November 22	at SMU	Ownby Stadium; University Park, TX	L 0–14	10,000	
November 29	at Rice	Rice Field; Houston, TX	L 14–28	14,000	
*Non-conference game; ^{†}Homecoming; Rankings from AP Poll released prior to the game
