= Jack Wilson (halfback) =

American football player (1917–2001)

No. 50
- Position: Halfback

Personal information
- Born: November 20, 1917; Paris, Texas, U.S.
- Died: April 11, 2001 (aged 83); Waco, Texas, U.S.
- Listed height: 6 ft 0 in (1.83 m)
- Listed weight: 200 lb (91 kg)

Career information
- High school: Paris
- College: Baylor
- NFL draft: 1942: 1st round, 2nd overall pick

Career history
- Los Angeles Rams (1946–1947)

Awards and highlights
- 2× Second-team All-SWC (1939, 1941)

Career NFL statistics
- Rushing yards: 123
- Rushing average: 5.6
- Receptions: 4
- Receiving yards: 25
- Total touchdowns: 1
- Stats at Pro Football Reference

Jack William Wilson (November 20, 1917 – April 11, 2001) was an American professional football player who was a halfback for two season with the Los Angeles Rams of the National Football League (NFL). Wilson was selected in the first round (2nd pick overall) by the Cleveland Rams in the 1942 NFL draft.
