= 1941 TCU Horned Frogs football team =

American college football season

1941 TCU Horned Frogs football

Orange Bowl, L 26–40 vs. Georgia
- Conference: Southwest Conference
- Record: 7–3–1 (4–1–1 SWC)
- Head coach: Dutch Meyer (8th season)
- Offensive scheme: Meyer spread
- Home stadium: Amon G. Carter Stadium

1941 Southwest Conference football standings
	Conf.					Overall
Team	W		L		T	W		L		T
No. 9 Texas A&M $	5	–	1	–	0	9	–	2	–	0
No. 4 Texas	4	–	1	–	1	8	–	1	–	1
TCU	4	–	1	–	1	7	–	3	–	1
Rice	3	–	2	–	1	6	–	3	–	1
SMU	2	–	4	–	0	5	–	5	–	0
Baylor	1	–	4	–	1	3	–	6	–	1
Arkansas	0	–	6	–	0	3	–	7	–	0
$ – Conference champion; Rankings from AP Poll

The 1941 TCU Horned Frogs football team was an American football team that represented Texas Christian University (TCU) in the Southwest Conference (SWC) during the 1941 college football season. In their eighth season under head coach Dutch Meyer, the Horned Frogs compiled a 7–3–1 record (4–1–1 against conference opponents), lost to Georgia in the 1942 Orange Bowl, and outscored opponents by a total of 162 to 135.

TCU was ranked at No. 23 (out of 681 teams) in the final rankings under the Litkenhous Difference by Score System for 1941.

The Frogs played their home games in Amon G. Carter Stadium, which is located on the TCU campus in Fort Worth, Texas.

== Schedule ==
Date	Opponent	Rank	Site	Result	Attendance	Source
September 27	Tulsa*		Amon G. Carter Stadium; Fort Worth, TX	W 6–0	7,500	
October 4	at Arkansas		Razorback Stadium; Fayetteville, AR	W 9–0	6,000	
October 11	at Indiana*		Memorial Stadium; Bloomington, IN	W 20–14	24,000	
October 18	No. 14 Texas A&M		Amon G. Carter Stadium; Fort Worth, TX (rivalry)	L 0–14	25,000	
October 25	at No. 6 Fordham*		Polo Grounds; New York, NY	L 14–28	39,500	
November 1	at Baylor		Waco Stadium; Waco, TX (rivalry)	W 23–12		
November 8	at Centenary*		Shreveport, LA	W 35–7		
November 15	at No. 2 Texas		Memorial Stadium; Austin, TX (rivalry)	W 14–7	23,000	
November 22	Rice	No. 19	Amon G. Carter Stadium; Fort Worth, TX	T 0–0	10,000	
November 29	at SMU		Amon G. Carter Stadium; Fort Worth, TX (rivalry)	W 15–13		
January 1, 1942	vs. Georgia		Burdine Stadium; Miami, FL (Orange Bowl)	L 26–40	38,000	
*Non-conference game; Rankings from AP Poll released prior to the game

== Rankings ==
Ranking movements Legend: ██ Increase in ranking ██ Decrease in ranking — = Not ranked
	Week							
Poll	1	2	3	4	5	6	7	Final
AP	—	—	—	—	—	19	—	—
