= Vern Martin =

American football player (1920–1949)

No. 27, 15
- Position: Quarterback

Personal information
- Born: May 2, 1920; Amarillo, Texas, U.S.
- Died: May 9, 1949 (aged 29); Memphis, Texas, U.S.
- Listed height: 5 ft 10 in (1.78 m)
- Listed weight: 195 lb (88 kg)

Career information
- High school: Amarillo
- College: Texas
- NFL draft: 1942: 2nd round, 11th overall pick

Career history
- Pittsburgh Steelers (1942)

Awards and highlights
- Second-team All-SWC (1941)

Career NFL statistics
- Receptions: 7
- Receiving yards: 64
- Receiving touchdowns: 1
- Stats at Pro Football Reference

Vernon Lewis Martin (May 2, 1920 – May 9, 1949) was a college and professional football player. He was the starting quarterback for the University of Texas in 1941, leading them to the school's first ever #1 ranking and the cover of the Nov 17, 1941 Life Magazine. He was drafted in the 2nd round of the 1942 NFL draft by the Pittsburgh Steelers and played one year of professional football.

== Early life ==
Vernon Martin was born in Amarillo on May 2, 1920. He played football at Amarillo High School and was a part of the Sanies 1936 undefeated State Championship team. He also was on the basketball team.

== College football ==
Martin started college at the University of Texas in 1938 playing on a freshman team that went 2–1. He was a starter at the beginning of the 1939 season, but was badly injured in the second game of the year against Wisconsin. He suffered an internal injury, and was rushed to the infirmary. He spent 10 days in the hospital and missed the rest of the season.

Martin recovered and was the starting quarterback, also known as the blocking back at the time, of the Texas Longhorns in 1940 and 1941. In 1940, the Longhorns went 8–2, but the highlight of the year came in the Thanksgiving Day upset of #2 Texas A&M. A&M was undefeated and the defending National Champion and the upset was such that the 13 Longhorns who played that day, of which Martin was one, were known at the time as "The Immortal Thirteen."

The Longhorns came into 1941 a highly regarded team, and it was perhaps the most impactful squad in the history of the program. It was the first Longhorn team to reach #1 in the rankings, produced the first consensus All-American, won the first Golden Hat as part of the annual game with Oklahoma, and was the team that inspired the red candle hex rally prior to Texas A&M games. Pete Layden was the fullback, who in the offense of the time did most of the passing and ball-handling, but Martin called most of the plays. The Longhorns won their first six games, by lopsided margins, to earn the #1 ranking and were then featured on the cover of Life magazine. They immediately suffered a 7–7 tie to Baylor and a 14–7 loss to TCU, mostly due to four injured starters, to drop to #10 before again upsetting Texas A&M who was again ranked #2 at the time. They finished the season with a 71–7 drumming of Oregon and at the end of the game, Martin caught a 5-yard touchdown pass from Layden for Martin's only touchdown of the year. Texas finished the season ranked #4, the first time Texas ever finished the season ranked, and Martin was named second team All-Conference. Martin also made Wirt Gammon's All-American Blockers team that year. The 1941 Longhorns were considered the greatest Texas team ever at the time.

== Pro football and military service ==
Following the season, Martin was drafted by the Pittsburgh Steelers in the second round of the 1942 NFL draft. He played blocking back for the Steelers in 1942, catching several passes and scoring two touchdowns.

He later joined the United States Army Air Forces during World War II and become a Flight Officer stationed in Shamshernagar, India, flying airlift missions over the Hump. In June 1945, the AAF announced plans to form seven football teams and in August, Martin was selected to ship out to Berry Field in Nashville to play for the Air Transport Command Rockets that year. Playing in an all-service league, the Rockets went 2–3–2 and finished ranked #11 in the Williamson Service Rankings.

Martin died in 1949 in a car crash in Memphis.
