= Walter Heap =

American football player (1921–1989)

- Walt Heap, 1946

No. 73, 80, 66
- Position: Back

Personal information
- Born: September 18, 1921; Taylor, Texas, U.S.
- Died: May 20, 1989 (aged 67); Dallas, Texas, U.S.
- Listed height: 6 ft 1 in (1.85 m)
- Listed weight: 210 lb (95 kg)

Career information
- High school: Taylor
- College: Texas (1940-1941, 1946)
- NFL draft: 1947: 2nd round, 13th overall pick

Career history
- Los Angeles Dons (1947–1948)

Career AAFC statistics
- Rushing yards: 15
- Rushing average: 1.9
- Receptions: 4
- Receiving yards: 9
- Total touchdowns: 3
- Interceptions: 10
- Stats at Pro Football Reference

Walter Richmond Heap Jr. (September 18, 1921 – May 20, 1989) was an American football player who played at the quarterback position on both offense and defensive. He played college football for Texas and professional football for the Los Angeles Dons.

== Early life ==
Heap was born in 1921 in Taylor, Texas. He attended and played football at Taylor High School.

== Military and college football ==
He played college football for the University of Texas Longhorns in 1940, 1941, and 1946.

His career was interrupted by service in the amphibious force of the United States Coast Guard during World War II. He served on LSTs in eight amphibious invasions in the Pacific theater of operations. Based on his outstanding battle record, he was chosen as a special honor guard for President Harry S. Truman at his June 1945 speech before the United Nations in San Francisco.

== Professional football ==
Heap was selected by the Boston Yanks in the second round (13th overall pick) of the 1947 NFL draft and by the Los Angeles Dons in the 10th round (77th overall pick) of the 1947 AAFC Draft. He played with the Dons during their 1947 and 1948 seasons.

== Family and later years ==
He died in 1989 at age 67 in Dallas.
