= List of NFL annual receiving yards leaders =

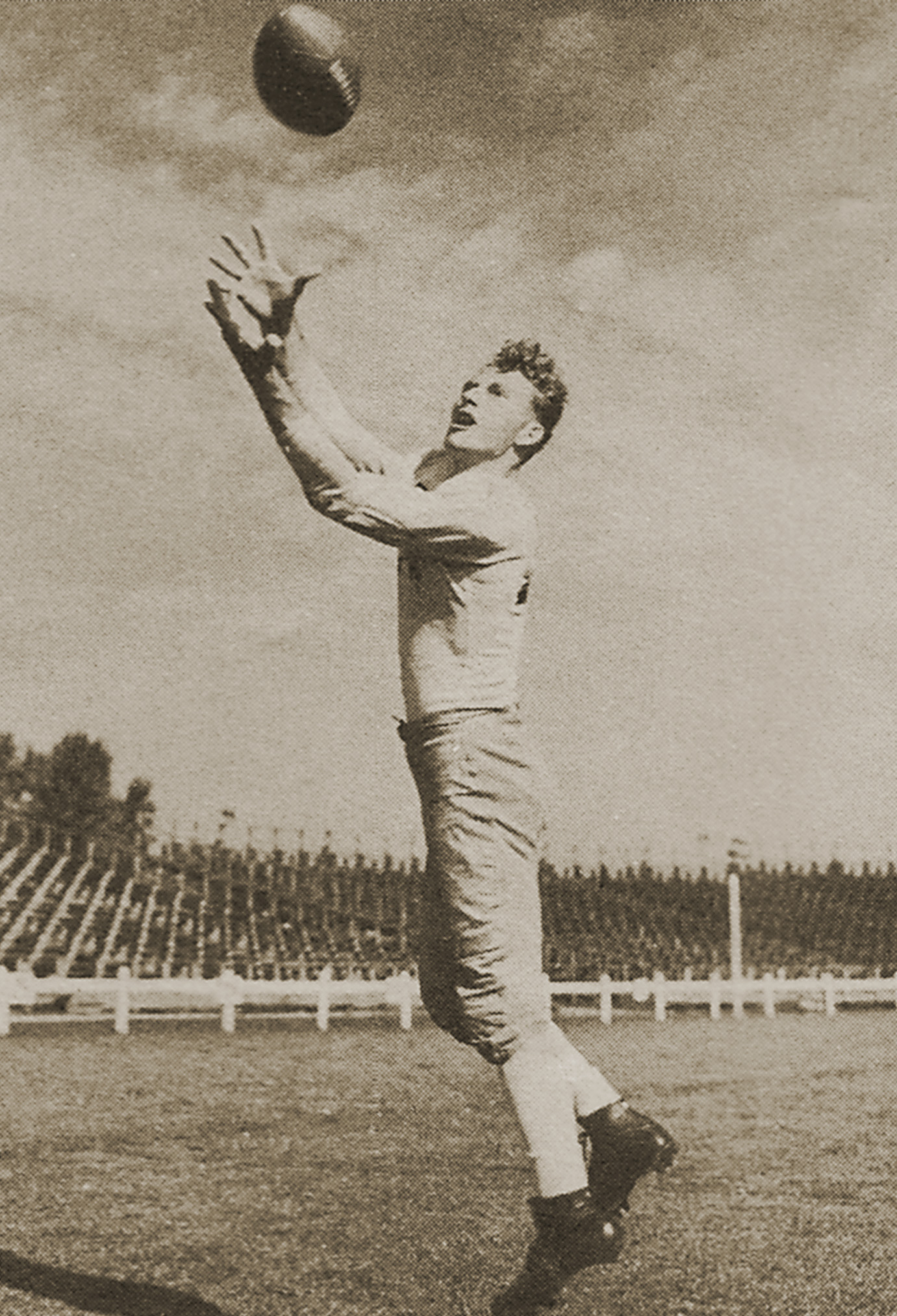
Don Hutson led the NFL in receiving yards a record seven times with the Green Bay Packers.

In American football, passing, along with running (also referred to as rushing), is one of the two main methods of advancing the ball down the field. Passes are typically attempted by the quarterback, but any offensive player can attempt a pass provided they are behind the line of scrimmage. To qualify as a passing play, the ball must have initially moved forward after leaving the hands of the passer; if the ball initially moved laterally or backwards, the play would instead be considered a running play. A player who catches a forward pass is a receiver, and the number of receiving yards each player has recorded in each season is a recorded stat in football games. In addition to the overall National Football League (NFL) receiving champion, league record books recognize statistics from the American Football League (AFL), which operated from 1960 to 1969 before being absorbed into the NFL in 1970. The NFL also recognizes the statistics of the All-America Football Conference, which operated from 1946 to 1949 before three of its teams were merged into the NFL, since 2025.

The NFL did not begin keeping official records until the 1932 season. The average yards the leader has gained has increased over time – since the adoption of the 14-game season in 1961, all but one season saw the receiving leader record over 1,000 yards. No player has ever finished with over 2,000 receiving yards in a season; the current record is 1,964 yards, set by Calvin Johnson during the 2012 season. Wes Chandler, who led the league with 1,032 yards in the strike-shortened 1982 season, averaged 129 yards receiving per game, an NFL record.

Don Hutson led the league in receiving yards seven times, the most of any player; Jerry Rice is second with six. Hutson also recorded the most consecutive seasons leading the league in receiving, doing so for five seasons from 1941 to 1945, while Jerry Rice ranks second with three consecutive league-leading seasons from 1993 to 1995; they are the only players to lead the league in yards in more than four seasons. A Green Bay Packers player has led the league in receiving yards eleven times, the most in the NFL; the Los Angeles/St. Louis Rams rank second with nine league-leading seasons. The most recent receiving yards leader was Jaxon Smith-Njigba of the Seattle Seahawks, who recorded 1,793 receiving yards during the 2025 season.

== NFL annual receiving yards leaders ==
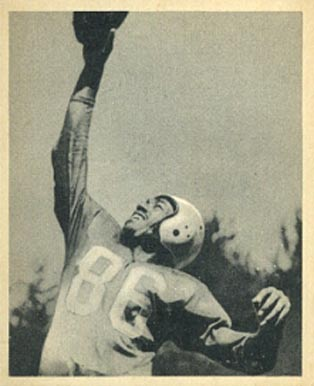
Bob Mann was the NFL's receiving yards leader in 1949, and the third player to lead the league in receiving while recording over 1,000 yards.

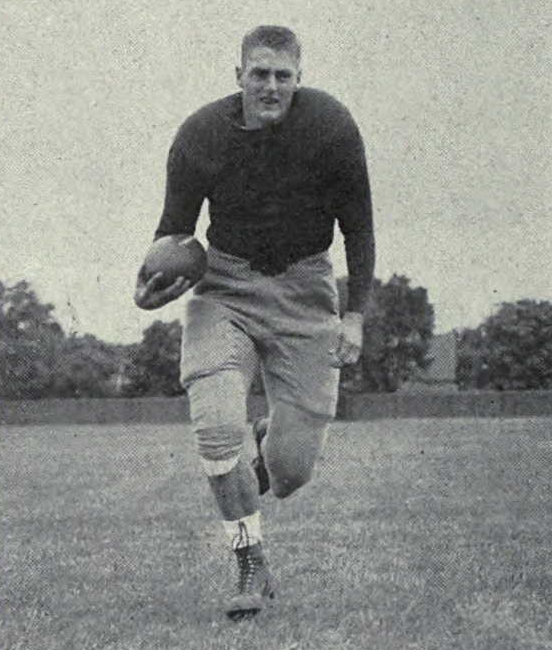
Elroy Hirsch, a Pro Football Hall of Fame member, led the league in receiving yards in 1951, recording 1,495 yards over a 12-game season.

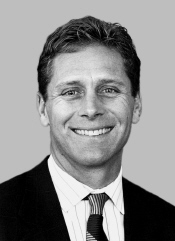
Future US Congressman Steve Largent led the league in receiving yards twice during his Hall of Fame career.

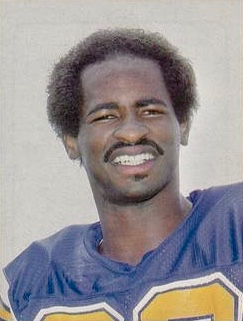
Wes Chandler led the league in 1982, when he averaged an NFL-record 129 yards per game during the strike-shortened season.

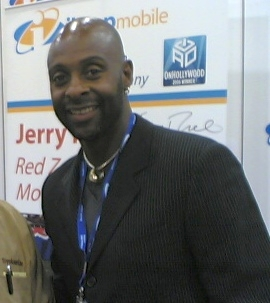
Hall of Fame member Jerry Rice, the NFL's all-time receiving yards leader, led the league in receiving yards six times over his career.

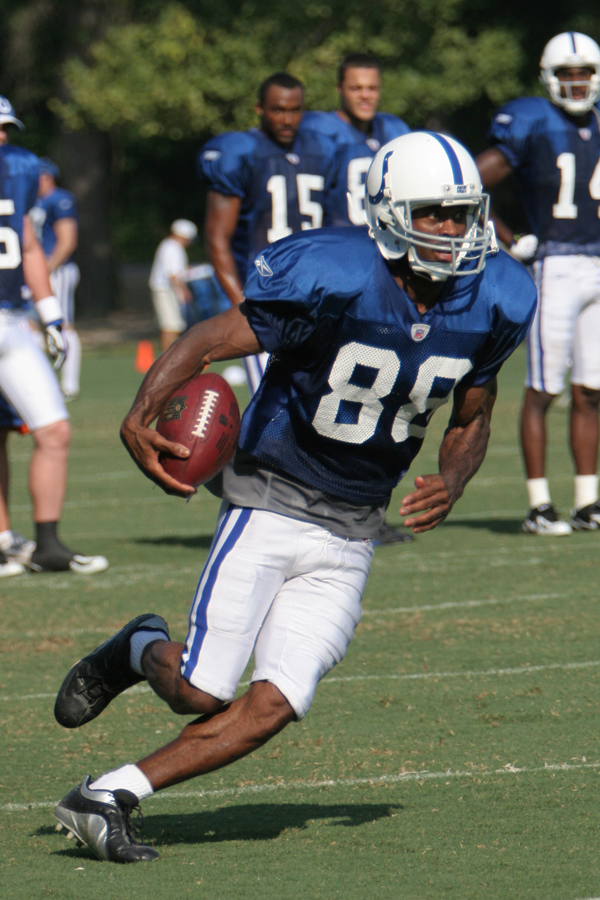
Marvin Harrison was the NFL's receiving yards leader twice over his career.

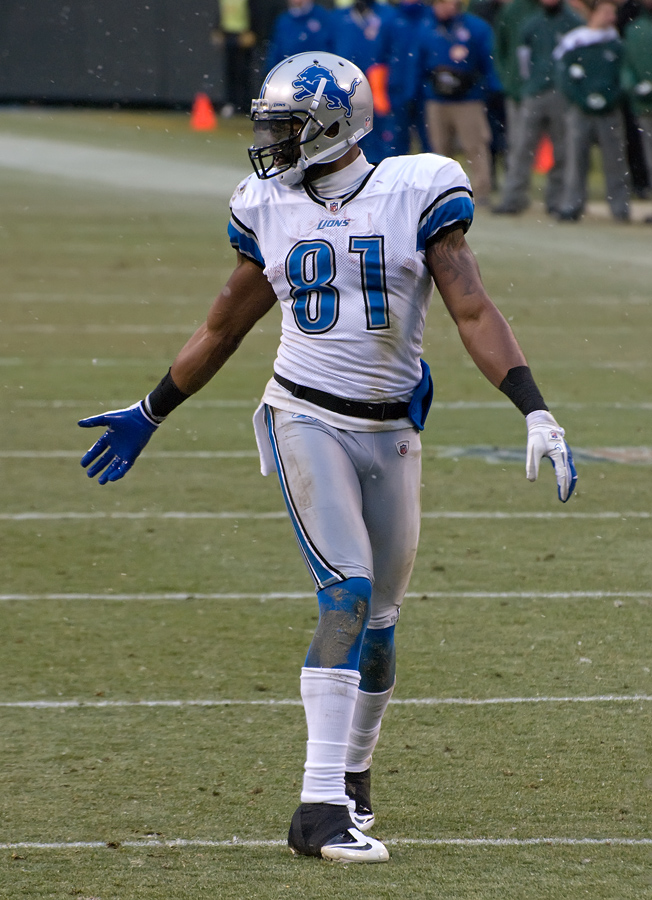
Calvin Johnson led the league in receiving yards in 2011 and followed it up by setting the league record for receiving yards in 2012.

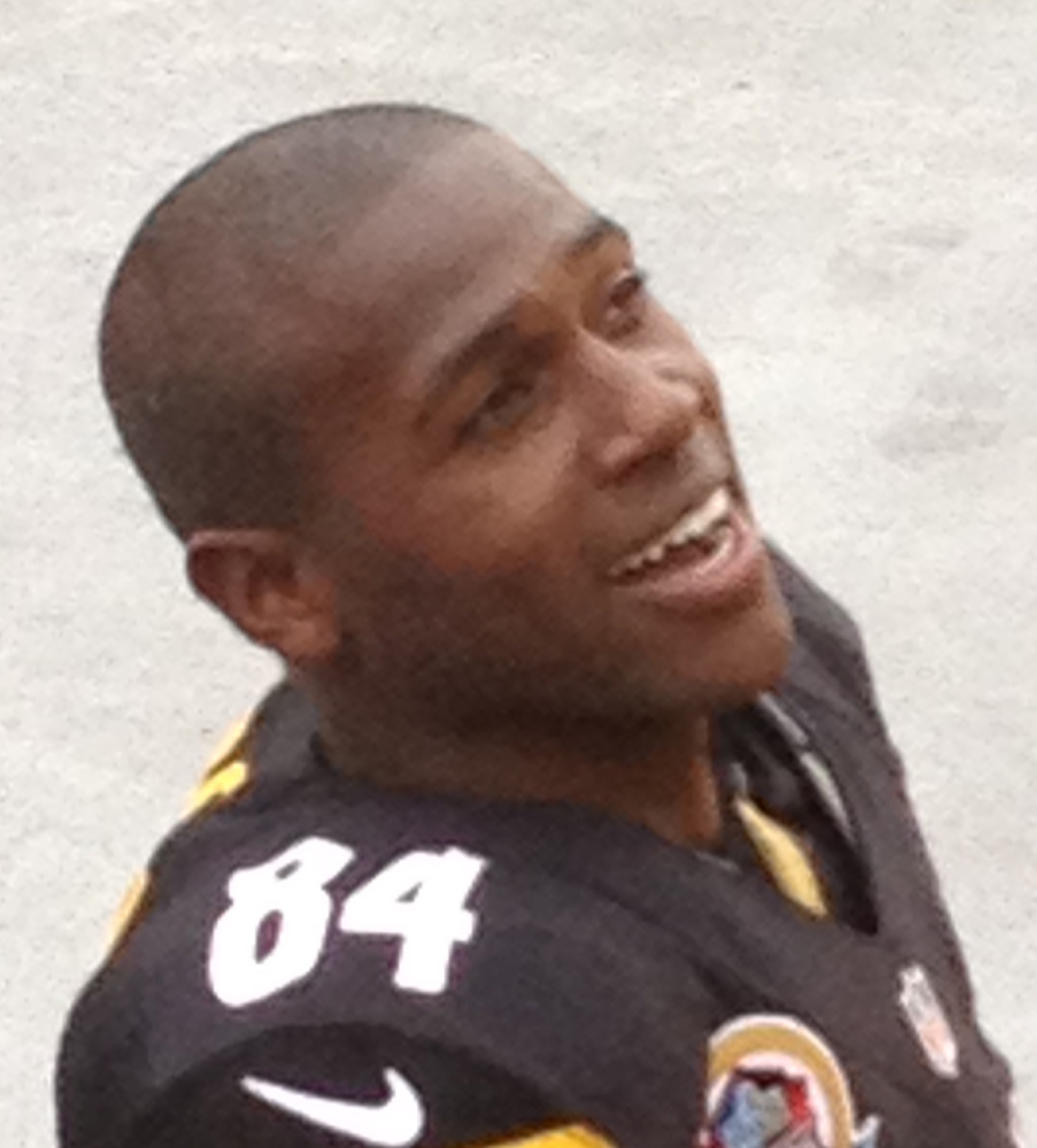
Antonio Brown led the league with 1,698 receiving yards in 2014 and again in 2017 with 1,533 yards.

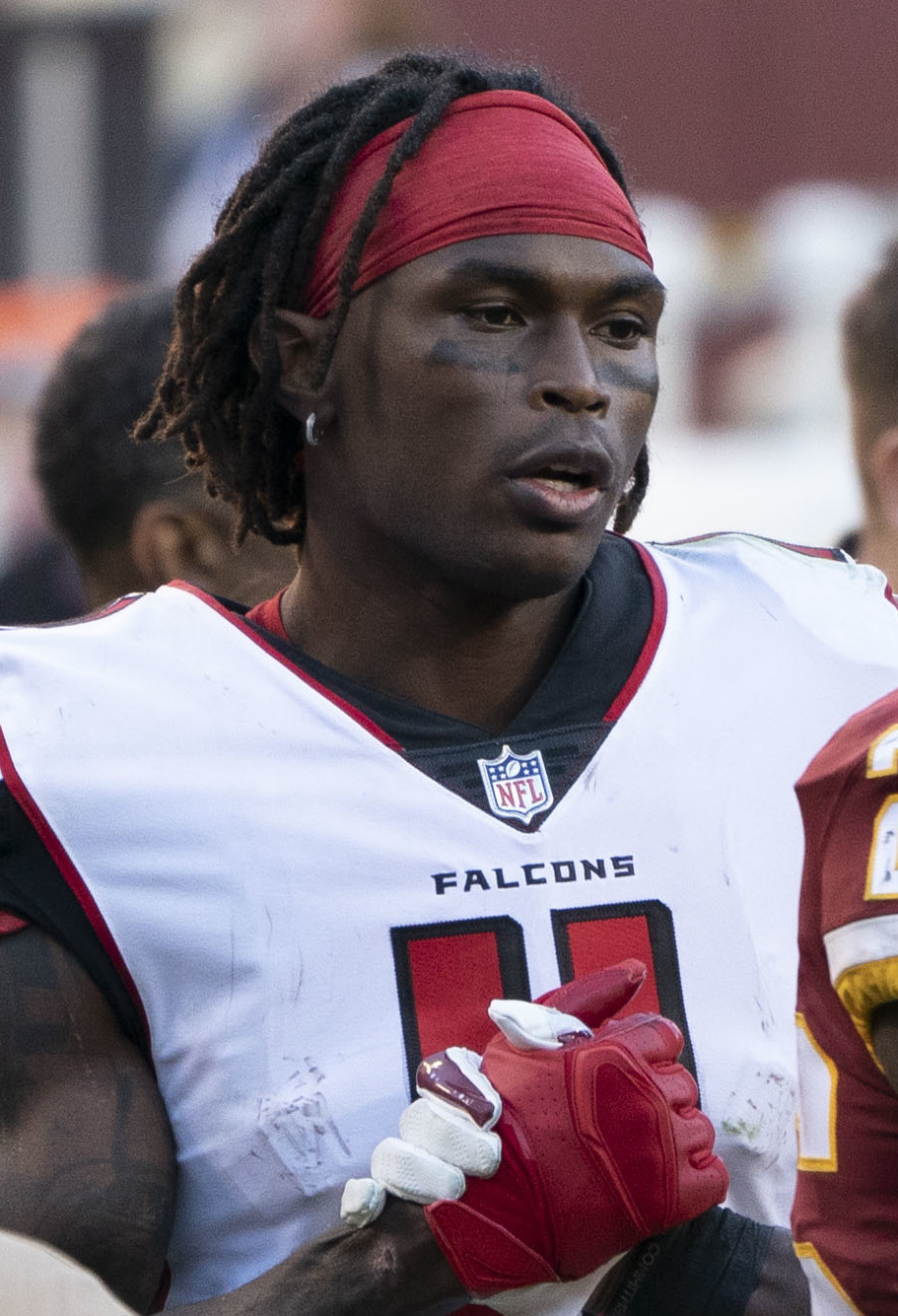
Julio Jones led the league in 2015 with 1,871 yards and again in 2018 with 1,677 yards.

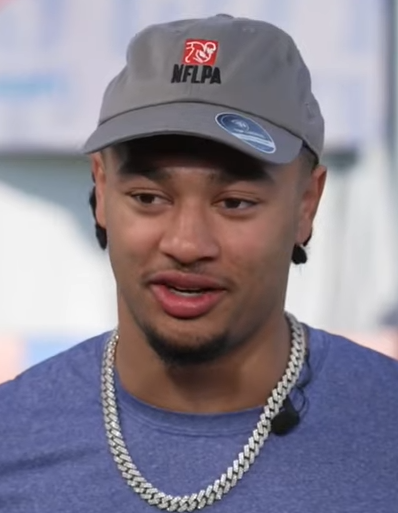
Jaxon Smith-Njigba is the most recent receiving yards leader, having led the league with 1,793 receiving yards in the 2025 season.

Key
| Symbol | Meaning |
|---|---|
| Leader | The player who recorded the most receiving yards in the NFL |
| Yds | The total number of receiving yards the player had |
| GP | The number of games that the player participated in during that season |
| † | Pro Football Hall of Fame member |
| ^ | The player is an active player |
| * | Player set the single-season receiving yards record |
| (#) | Denotes the number of times a player appears in this list |

NFL annual receiving yards leaders by season
| Season | Leader | Yds | GP | Team | Refs |
|---|---|---|---|---|---|
| 1932 | Ray Flaherty^{†} | 350^{*} | 12 | New York Giants | |
| 1933 | Paul Moss | 283 | 10 | Pittsburgh Pirates | |
| 1934 | Harry Ebding | 264 | 12 | Detroit Lions | |
| 1935 | Charley Malone | 433^{*} | 11 | Boston Redskins | |
| 1936 | Don Hutson^{†} | 536^{*} | 12 | Green Bay Packers | |
| 1937 | Gaynell Tinsley | 675^{*} | 11 | Chicago Cardinals | |
| 1938 | Don Hutson^{†} (2) | 548 | 10 | Green Bay Packers | |
| 1939 | Don Hutson^{†} (3) | 846^{*} | 11 | Green Bay Packers | |
| 1940 | Don Looney | 707 | 11 | Philadelphia Eagles | |
| 1941 | Don Hutson^{†} (4) | 738 | 11 | Green Bay Packers | |
| 1942 | Don Hutson^{†} (5) | 1,211^{*} | 11 | Green Bay Packers | |
| 1943 | Don Hutson^{†} (6) | 776 | 10 | Green Bay Packers | |
| 1944 | Don Hutson^{†} (7) | 866 | 10 | Green Bay Packers | |
| 1945 | Jim Benton | 1,067 | 9 | Cleveland Rams | |
| 1946 | Jim Benton (2) | 981 | 11 | Los Angeles Rams | |
| 1947 | Mal Kutner | 944 | 12 | Chicago Cardinals | |
| 1948 | Mal Kutner (2) | 943 | 12 | Chicago Cardinals | |
| 1949 | Bob Mann | 1,014 | 12 | Detroit Lions | |
| 1950 | Tom Fears^{†} | 1,116 | 12 | Los Angeles Rams | |
| 1951 | Elroy Hirsch^{†} | 1,495^{*} | 12 | Los Angeles Rams | |
| 1952 | Billy Howton | 1,231 | 12 | Green Bay Packers | |
| 1953 | Pete Pihos^{†} | 1,049 | 12 | Philadelphia Eagles | |
| 1954 | Bob Boyd | 1,212 | 12 | Los Angeles Rams | |
| 1955 | Pete Pihos^{†} (2) | 864 | 12 | Philadelphia Eagles | |
| 1956 | Billy Howton (2) | 1,188 | 12 | Green Bay Packers | |
| 1957 | Raymond Berry^{†} | 800 | 12 | Baltimore Colts | |
| 1958 | Del Shofner | 1,097 | 12 | Los Angeles Rams | |
| 1959 | Raymond Berry^{†} (2) | 959 | 12 | Baltimore Colts | |
| 1960 | Raymond Berry^{†} (3) | 1,298 | 12 | Baltimore Colts | |
| 1961 | Tommy McDonald^{†} | 1,144 | 14 | Philadelphia Eagles | |
| 1962 | Bobby Mitchell^{†} | 1,384 | 14 | Washington Redskins | |
| 1963 | Bobby Mitchell^{†} (2) | 1,436 | 14 | Washington Redskins | |
| 1964 | Johnny Morris | 1,200 | 14 | Chicago Bears | |
| 1965 | Dave Parks | 1,344 | 14 | San Francisco 49ers | |
| 1966 | Pat Studstill | 1,266 | 14 | Detroit Lions | |
| 1967 | Ben Hawkins | 1,265 | 14 | Philadelphia Eagles | |
| 1968 | Roy Jefferson | 1,074 | 14 | Pittsburgh Steelers | |
| 1969 | Harold Jackson | 1,116 | 14 | Philadelphia Eagles | |
| 1970 | Gene Washington | 1,100 | 13 | San Francisco 49ers | |
| 1971 | Otis Taylor | 1,110 | 14 | Kansas City Chiefs | |
| 1972 | Harold Jackson (2) | 1,048 | 14 | Philadelphia Eagles | |
| 1973 | Harold Carmichael^{†} | 1,116 | 14 | Philadelphia Eagles | |
| 1974 | Cliff Branch^{†} | 1,092 | 14 | Oakland Raiders | |
| 1975 | Ken Burrough | 1,063 | 14 | Houston Oilers | |
| 1976 | Roger Carr | 1,112 | 14 | Baltimore Colts | |
| 1977 | Drew Pearson^{†} | 870 | 14 | Dallas Cowboys | |
| 1978 | Wesley Walker | 1,169 | 16 | New York Jets | |
| 1979 | Steve Largent^{†} | 1,237 | 15 | Seattle Seahawks | |
| 1980 | John Jefferson | 1,340 | 16 | San Diego Chargers | |
| 1981 | Alfred Jenkins | 1,358 | 16 | Atlanta Falcons | |
| 1982 | Wes Chandler | 1,032 | 8 | San Diego Chargers | |
| 1983 | Mike Quick | 1,409 | 16 | Philadelphia Eagles | |
| 1984 | Roy Green | 1,555^{*} | 16 | St. Louis Cardinals | |
| 1985 | Steve Largent^{†} (2) | 1,287 | 16 | Seattle Seahawks | |
| 1986 | Jerry Rice^{†} | 1,570^{*} | 15 | San Francisco 49ers | |
| 1987 | J. T. Smith | 1,117 | 15 | St. Louis Cardinals | |
| 1988 | Henry Ellard | 1,414 | 16 | Los Angeles Rams | |
| 1989 | Jerry Rice^{†} (2) | 1,483 | 16 | San Francisco 49ers | |
| 1990 | Jerry Rice^{†} (3) | 1,502 | 16 | San Francisco 49ers | |
| 1991 | Michael Irvin^{†} | 1,523 | 16 | Dallas Cowboys | |
| 1992 | Sterling Sharpe^{†} | 1,461 | 16 | Green Bay Packers | |
| 1993 | Jerry Rice^{†} (4) | 1,503 | 16 | San Francisco 49ers | |
| 1994 | Jerry Rice^{†} (5) | 1,499 | 16 | San Francisco 49ers | |
| 1995 | Jerry Rice^{†} (6) | 1,848^{*} | 16 | San Francisco 49ers | |
| 1996 | Isaac Bruce^{†} | 1,338 | 16 | St. Louis Rams | |
| 1997 | Rob Moore | 1,584 | 16 | Arizona Cardinals | |
| 1998 | Antonio Freeman | 1,424 | 15 | Green Bay Packers | |
| 1999 | Marvin Harrison^{†} | 1,663 | 16 | Indianapolis Colts | |
| 2000 | Torry Holt | 1,635 | 16 | St. Louis Rams | |
| 2001 | David Boston | 1,598 | 16 | Arizona Cardinals | |
| 2002 | Marvin Harrison^{†} (2) | 1,722 | 16 | Indianapolis Colts | |
| 2003 | Torry Holt (2) | 1,696 | 16 | St. Louis Rams | |
| 2004 | Muhsin Muhammad | 1,405 | 16 | Carolina Panthers | |
| 2005 | Steve Smith | 1,563 | 16 | Carolina Panthers | |
| 2006 | Chad Johnson | 1,369 | 16 | Cincinnati Bengals | |
| 2007 | Reggie Wayne | 1,510 | 16 | Indianapolis Colts | |
| 2008 | Andre Johnson^{†} | 1,575 | 16 | Houston Texans | |
| 2009 | Andre Johnson^{†} (2) | 1,569 | 16 | Houston Texans | |
| 2010 | Brandon Lloyd | 1,448 | 16 | Denver Broncos | |
| 2011 | Calvin Johnson^{†} | 1,681 | 16 | Detroit Lions | |
| 2012 | Calvin Johnson^{†} (2) | 1,964^{*} | 16 | Detroit Lions | |
| 2013 | Josh Gordon | 1,646 | 14 | Cleveland Browns | |
| 2014 | Antonio Brown | 1,698 | 16 | Pittsburgh Steelers | |
| 2015 | Julio Jones | 1,871 | 16 | Atlanta Falcons | |
| 2016 | T. Y. Hilton | 1,448 | 16 | Indianapolis Colts | |
| 2017 | Antonio Brown (2) | 1,533 | 14 | Pittsburgh Steelers | |
| 2018 | Julio Jones (2) | 1,677 | 16 | Atlanta Falcons | |
| 2019 | Michael Thomas | 1,725 | 16 | New Orleans Saints | |
| 2020 | Stefon Diggs^{^} | 1,535 | 16 | Buffalo Bills | |
| 2021 | Cooper Kupp^{^} | 1,947 | 17 | Los Angeles Rams | |
| 2022 | Justin Jefferson^{^} | 1,809 | 17 | Minnesota Vikings | |
| 2023 | Tyreek Hill | 1,799 | 16 | Miami Dolphins | |
| 2024 | Ja'Marr Chase^{^} | 1,708 | 17 | Cincinnati Bengals | |
| 2025 | Jaxon Smith-Njigba^{^} | 1,793 | 17 | Seattle Seahawks | |

== AFL annual receiving yards leaders ==
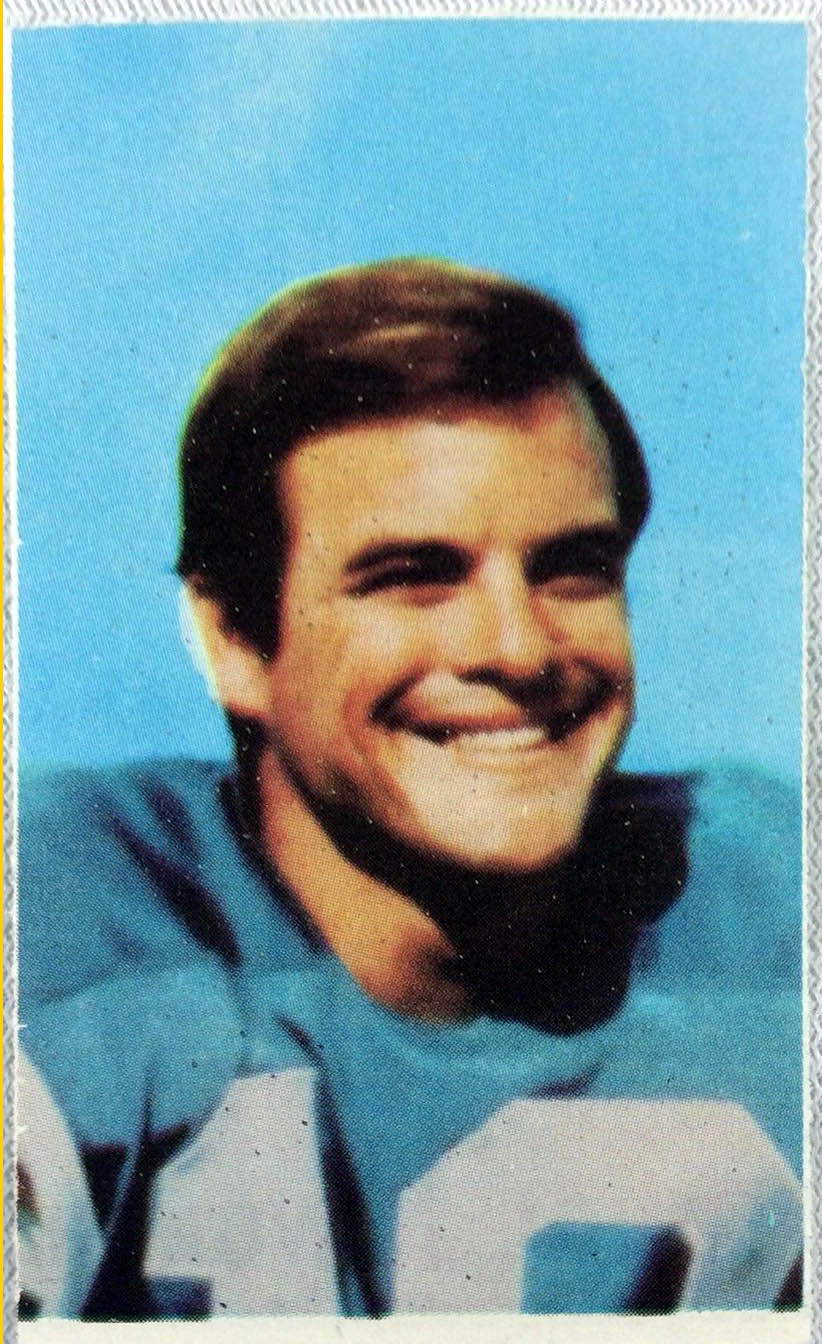
Lance Alworth led the AFL three times in receiving yards to become the third player to do so in pro football history; only one other player since Alworth's retirement has led the league for yards in three seasons.

Key
| Symbol | Meaning |
|---|---|
| Player | The player who recorded the most receiving yards in the AFL |
| Yds | The total number of receiving yards the player had |
| GP | The number of games that the player participated in during that season |
| † | Pro Football Hall of Fame member |
| * | Set the single-season receiving yards record |
| (#) | Denotes the number of times a player appears in this list |

AFL annual receiving yards leaders by season
| Season | Player | Team | Yds | GP | Refs |
|---|---|---|---|---|---|
| 1960 | Bill Groman | Houston Oilers | 1,473* | 14 | |
| 1961 | Charley Hennigan | Houston Oilers | 1,746* | 14 | |
| 1962 | Art Powell | New York Titans | 1,130 | 14 | |
| 1963 | Art Powell (2) | Oakland Raiders | 1,304 | 14 | |
| 1964 | Charley Hennigan (2) | Houston Oilers | 1,546 | 14 | |
| 1965 | Lance Alworth† | San Diego Chargers | 1,602 | 14 | |
| 1966 | Lance Alworth† (2) | San Diego Chargers | 1,383 | 13 | |
| 1967 | Don Maynard† | New York Jets | 1,434 | 14 | |
| 1968 | Lance Alworth† (3) | San Diego Chargers | 1,312 | 14 | |
| 1969 | Warren Wells | Oakland Raiders | 1,260 | 14 | |

== AAFC annual receiving yards leaders ==
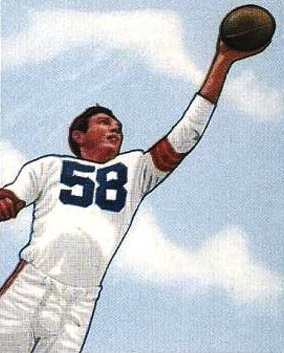
Mac Speedie led the league in receiving yards twice, doing so with 1,000-yard seasons in 1947 and 1949.

Key
| Symbol | Meaning |
|---|---|
| Leader | The player who recorded the most receiving yards in the AAFC |
| Yds | The total number of receiving yards the player had |
| GP | The number of games played by a player during the season |
| † | Pro Football Hall of Fame member |
| * | Set the single-season receiving yards record |
| (#) | Denotes the number of times a player appears in this list |

AAFC annual receiving yards leaders by season
| Season | Player | Yds | GP | Team | Refs |
|---|---|---|---|---|---|
| 1946 | Dante Lavelli† | 843* | 14 | Cleveland Browns | |
| 1947 | Mac Speedie† | 1,146* | 14 | Cleveland Browns | |
| 1948 | Billy Hillenbrand | 970 | 14 | Baltimore Colts | |
| 1949 | Mac Speedie† (2) | 1,028 | 12 | Cleveland Browns | |

== Historical records for most receiving yards in one season ==
Records held for most receiving yards in a single season
| Season | Player | Team | Receiving Yards | Games played | Reign |
|---|---|---|---|---|---|
| 1932 | Ray Flaherty^ | New York Giants | 350 | 12 | 3 years |
| 1935 | Charley Malone | Boston Redskins | 433 | 11 | 1 year |
| 1936 | Don Hutson^ | Green Bay Packers | 536 | 12 | 1 year |
| 1937 | Gaynell Tinsley | Chicago Cardinals | 675 | 11 | 2 years |
| 1939 | Don Hutson^ | Green Bay Packers | 846 | 11 | 3 years |
| 1942 | Don Hutson^ | Green Bay Packers | 1,211 | 11 | 9 years |
| 1951 | Elroy Hirsch^ | Los Angeles Rams | 1,495 | 12 | 33 years |
| 1984 | Roy Green | St. Louis Cardinals | 1,555 | 16 | 2 years |
| 1986 | Jerry Rice^ | San Francisco 49ers | 1,570 | 15 | 9 years |
| 1995 | Jerry Rice^ | San Francisco 49ers | 1,848 | 16 | 17 years |
| 2012 | Calvin Johnson^ | Detroit Lions | 1,964 | 16 | Since 2012 |

== Most seasons leading the league ==
| Count | Player | Seasons | Team | Refs |
|---|---|---|---|---|
| 7 | Don Hutson | 1936, 1938, 1939, 1941–1944 | Green Bay Packers | |
| 6 | Jerry Rice | 1986, 1989, 1990, 1993–1995 | San Francisco 49ers | |
| 3 | Lance Alworth | 1965, 1966, 1968 | San Diego Chargers | |
| 3 | Raymond Berry | 1957, 1959, 1960 | Baltimore Colts | |
| 2 | Jim Benton | 1945, 1946 | Cleveland Rams (1) / Los Angeles Rams (1) | |
| 2 | Antonio Brown | 2014, 2017 | Pittsburgh Steelers | |
| 2 | Marvin Harrison | 1999, 2002 | Indianapolis Colts | |
| 2 | Charley Hennigan | 1961, 1964 | Houston Oilers | |
| 2 | Torry Holt | 2000, 2003 | St. Louis Rams | |
| 2 | Billy Howton | 1952, 1956 | Green Bay Packers | |
| 2 | Harold Jackson | 1967, 1972 | Philadelphia Eagles | |
| 2 | Andre Johnson | 2008, 2009 | Houston Texans | |
| 2 | Calvin Johnson | 2011, 2012 | Detroit Lions | |
| 2 | Julio Jones | 2015, 2018 | Atlanta Falcons | |
| 2 | Mal Kutner | 1947, 1948 | Chicago Cardinals | |
| 2 | Steve Largent | 1979, 1985 | Seattle Seahawks | |
| 2 | Bobby Mitchell | 1962, 1963 | Washington Redskins | |
| 2 | Pete Pihos | 1953, 1955 | Philadelphia Eagles | |
| 2 | Art Powell | 1962, 1963 | New York Titans (1) / Oakland Raiders (1) | |
| 2 | Mac Speedie | 1947, 1949 | Cleveland Browns | |

== See also ==
- List of NFL annual receiving touchdowns leaders
- List of NFL career receiving yards leaders
