= Derace Moser =

American football player (1920–1943)

Profile
- Position: Halfback

Personal information
- Born: February 5, 1920; Erath County, Texas, U.S.
- Died: November 19, 1943 (aged 23); Hillsborough, Florida, U.S.

Career information
- College: Texas A&M

Awards and highlights
- National champion (1939); First-team All-American (1941); First-team All-SWC (1941); Most valuable back, Southwest Conference (1941)

Robert Derace Moser (February 5, 1920 – November 19, 1943) was an American football player. He played college football for Texas A&M from 1939 to 1941 and was selected as a first-team All-American in 1941. He served in the military during World War II and was killed in the collision of two B-17 Flying Fortresses in November 1943.

== Early life ==
Moser was born in 1920 in Erath County, Texas.

== Texas A&M ==
He played college football for the Texas A&M Aggies football team from 1939 to 1941, including the 1939 national championship team. He was selected by the Newspaper Enterprise Association as a first-team halfback on the 1941 College Football All-America Team.

As a senior, Moser led the 1941 Texas A&M Aggies football team to the Southwest Conference championship. He ranked among the nation's leading passers, completing 67 of 166 passes for 912 yards. He also ranked among the nation's leaders with 1,250 yards of total offense (912 passing and 338 rushing yards). He was also selected as the most valuable back in the Southwest Conference for the 1941 season.

== Military service ==
In May 1941, and following the United States' entry into World War II, Moser was commissioned as a second lieutenant in the United States Army Air Forces. He received his degree from Texas A&M while being processed at Perrin Field. By the summer of 1942, Moser had been transferred to Chanute Field in Illinois where he was appointed as the field's assistant physical training officer.

In September 1942, he played for the college all-star team in a charity football game against the Philadelphia Eagles. Moser passed 35 yards to Fred Meyer for the all-stars' lone touchdown in the game.

By March 1943, Moser was a flying cadet at the Brady Aviation School at Blackland Army Air Field in Waco, Texas.

In June 1943, while stationed at Waco, Moser was reported missing during a flight. He had made an emergency landing at Waxahachie, Texas.

Moser died in November 1943 in a mid-air collision of two B-17 Flying Fortresses east of MacDill Field in Florida. Moser was the co-pilot of one of the planes. A total of eight men died in the crash. He was the second member of the 1939 Texas A&M football team to be killed in the war.

At a memorial held at Texas A&M for Moser, coach Homer Norton said: "Derace was a great boy, a great athlete, a great leader. I have always classed him as one of the best athletes I ever coached."
