= 1941 Texas A&M Aggies football team =

American college football season

1941 Texas A&M Aggies football

SWC champion

Cotton Bowl Classic, L 21–29 vs. Alabama
- Conference: Southwest Conference

Ranking
- AP: No. 9
- Record: 9–2 (5–1 SWC)
- Head coach: Homer Norton (8th season)
- Home stadium: Kyle Field

1941 Southwest Conference football standings
	Conf.					Overall
Team	W		L		T	W		L		T
No. 9 Texas A&M $	5	–	1	–	0	9	–	2	–	0
No. 4 Texas	4	–	1	–	1	8	–	1	–	1
TCU	4	–	1	–	1	7	–	3	–	1
Rice	3	–	2	–	1	6	–	3	–	1
SMU	2	–	4	–	0	5	–	5	–	0
Baylor	1	–	4	–	1	3	–	6	–	1
Arkansas	0	–	6	–	0	3	–	7	–	0
$ – Conference champion; Rankings from AP Poll

The 1941 Texas A&M Aggies football team represented the Agricultural and Mechanical College of Texas—now known as Texas A&M University—as a member of the Southwest Conference during the 1941 college football season. In their eighth season under head coach Homer Norton, the Aggies compiled a 9–1 record in the regular season, won the conference championship, and were ranked No. 9 in the final AP Poll. The team then lost to Alabama in the 1942 Cotton Bowl Classic. The team outscored all opponents by a total of 281 to 75. The team played its home games at Kyle Field in College Station, Texas.

Four Texas A&M players were selected by the Associated Press (AP) or United Press (UP) on the 1941 All-Southwest Conference football team: back Derace Moser (AP-1, UP-1); end James Sterling (AP-1, UP-1); tackle Martin Ruby (AP-1, UP-1); and center Bill Sibley (AP-1, UP-1). Moser was also selected as the most valuable player in the Southwest Conference.

== Schedule ==
Date	Opponent	Rank	Site	Result	Attendance	Source
September 27	Sam Houston State*		Kyle Field; College Station, TX	W 54–0	10,000	
October 4	vs. Texas A&I*		Alamo Stadium; San Antonio, TX	W 41–0	16,955	
October 11	at NYU*		Yankee Stadium; New York, NY	W 49–7	18,000	
October 18	at TCU	No. 14	Amon G. Carter Stadium; Fort Worth, TX (rivalry)	W 14–0	25,000	
October 25	Baylor	No. 9	Kyle Field; College Station, TX (rivalry)	W 48–0		
November 1	vs. Arkansas	No. 5	Quigley Stadium; Little Rock, AR (rivalry)	W 7–0	9,762	
November 8	SMU	No. 5	Kyle Field; College Station, TX	W 21–10	20,000	
November 15	at Rice	No. 4	Rice Field; Houston, TX	W 19–6		
November 27	No. 10 Texas	No. 2	Kyle Field; College Station, TX (rivalry)	L 0–23	40,000	
December 6	vs. No. 19 Washington State*	No. 9	Tacoma Stadium; Tacoma, WA (Evergreen Bowl)	W 7–0	26,000	
January 1	vs. No. 20 Alabama*	No. 9	Cotton Bowl; Dallas, TX (Cotton Bowl Classic)	L 21–29	38,000	
*Non-conference game; Rankings from AP Poll released prior to the game

== Rankings ==
Ranking movements Legend: ██ Increase in ranking ██ Decrease in ranking ( ) = First-place votes
	Week							
Poll	1	2	3	4	5	6	7	Final
AP	14	9	5	5	4 (6)	2 (5)	2 (2)	9
