= Josh Gordon =

American football player (born 1991)

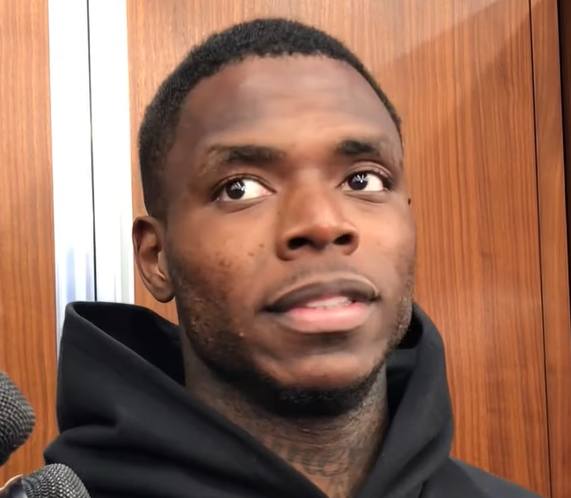
- Gordon in 2019

No. 13, 12, 10, 19, 0
- Position: Wide receiver

Personal information
- Born: April 13, 1991 (age 35); Houston, Texas, U.S.
- Listed height: 6 ft 3 in (1.91 m)
- Listed weight: 224 lb (102 kg)

Career information
- High school: Lamar (Houston)
- College: Baylor (2009–2010)
- Supplemental draft: 2012: 2nd round

Career history
- Cleveland Browns (2012–2018); New England Patriots (2018–2019); Seattle Seahawks (2019–2020); FCF Zappers (2021); Kansas City Chiefs (2021); Tennessee Titans (2022); Seattle Sea Dragons (2023)

Awards and highlights
- Super Bowl champion (LIII); First-team All-Pro (2013); Pro Bowl (2013); NFL receiving yards leader (2013)

Career NFL statistics
- Receptions: 252
- Receiving yards: 4,284
- Receiving touchdowns: 21
- Stats at Pro Football Reference

Joshua Caleb Gordon (born April 13, 1991) is an American former professional football wide receiver who played in the National Football League (NFL) for eight seasons. Nicknamed "Flash", he played college football for the Baylor Bears and was selected by the Cleveland Browns in the second round of the 2012 NFL Supplemental draft. Throughout his career, Gordon was lauded for his on-field production, but also faced several suspensions for violating the NFL's substance abuse policy.

Gordon had a breakout season in 2013 by leading the league in receiving yards, which earned him Pro Bowl and first-team All-Pro honors. Over the next four seasons, Gordon only played in 11 games for the Browns due to his substance abuse suspensions, missing the entirety of the 2015 and 2016 seasons. Gordon was traded to the New England Patriots in 2018, but voluntarily left the active roster amid a potential indefinite suspension from the NFL. He returned to New England the following season and later signed with the Seattle Seahawks before further substance abuse violations led to his suspension in 2020. Reinstated the next year, Gordon spent his last two seasons in the NFL with the Kansas City Chiefs and Tennessee Titans.

== Early life ==
Gordon was born to Elaine and Herald Gordon in Houston, Texas, on April 13, 1991. He has two brothers, and is of Haitian descent.

Gordon attended Lamar High School in Houston, where he played football and ran track. He additionally played basketball as a sophomore. As a junior playing football, he caught 20 passes for 363 yards and four touchdowns. As a senior, he was named first-team All-District 20-5A after totaling 25 receptions for 531 yards (21.2 average) and nine touchdowns.

He also competed in track and field as a senior, where he ran a leg on the Lamar 4 × 100m and 4 × 200m relay squads, helping them capture the state title in both events with times of 0:42.69 seconds and 1:30.43 minutes, respectively.

During the college recruitment period, Gordon was targeted by Baylor, Houston, Kansas, Missouri, Nebraska, and Texas Tech. According to Rivals.com, Gordon was ranked as a 3-star wide receiver, while Scout.com rated him as a 2-star at the position.

College recruiting
Name	Hometown	School	Height	Weight	40^{‡}	Commit date
Josh Gordon; Wide receiver	Houston, Texas	Lamar	6 ft 3 in (1.91 m)	225 lb (102 kg)	4.40	Jan 26, 2009
Josh Gordon; Wide receiver	Recruit ratings: Scout: Rivals: (75)					
Overall recruit ranking: Scout: 224 (WR) Rivals: 70 (WR) ESPN: 128 (WR)
Note: In many cases, Scout, Rivals, 247Sports, On3, and ESPN may conflict in their listings of height and weight.; In these cases, the average was taken. ESPN grades are on a 100-point scale.; Sources: "Baylor Football Commitments". Rivals.; "2009 Baylor Football Commits". Scout.; "ESPN". ESPN.; "Scout.com Team Recruiting Rankings". Scout.; "2009 Team Ranking". Rivals.com.

== College career ==
Gordon accepted an athletic scholarship to play football for Baylor University. Although he received multiple Division I offers, his choice of Baylor was easy due to his supervised probation following a felony he committed when he was 17, which required him to not leave the state of Texas. On the morning of October 3, 2010, during his sophomore year, he and teammate Willie Jefferson were found asleep in a local Taco Bell drive-thru lane, where police found marijuana in Jefferson's car. Jefferson, who was driving, was kicked off the team due to it being his second violation, but Gordon was only suspended. Gordon finished the 2010 season with 42 receptions for 714 yards and 7 receiving touchdowns, leading the Big 12 conference in yards per reception (17.0). In July 2011, Gordon was suspended indefinitely by head coach Art Briles for failing a drug test and testing positive for marijuana. In August, Gordon transferred to the University of Utah, but did not play during the 2011 season after declaring too late for the 2011 NFL Supplemental draft.

== Professional career ==
Pre-draft measurables
Height	Weight	Arm length	Hand span	40-yard dash	10-yard split	20-yard split	Vertical jump	Broad jump	Bench press
6 ft 3 1/8 in (1.91 m)	224 lb (102 kg)	33 1/4 in (0.84 m)	10 in (0.25 m)	4.52 s	1.57 s	2.64 s	35.5 in (0.90 m)	10 ft 2 in (3.10 m)	13 reps
All values from Pro Day

=== Cleveland Browns ===
==== 2012 season ====
Gordon was selected in the second round of the 2012 Supplemental draft by the Cleveland Browns. On July 16, 2012, Gordon signed a four-year, $5.3 million deal with the Browns.

In Week 5 of the 2012 season against the New York Giants, Gordon scored two receiving touchdowns, including the first of his career. He had two receptions for 82 yards, both of which he hauled in for his first two career touchdowns, in the 27–41 road loss. In Week 13 against the Oakland Raiders, Gordon had his first game with 100 receiving yards, recording six catches for 116 yards and a receiving touchdown in the narrow 20–17 road win. He finished his rookie season with 50 receptions for 805 yards and five receiving touchdowns, as well as the only fumble of his career, in 16 games and 13 starts.

==== 2013 season ====
On June 7, 2013, the NFL announced that Gordon would be suspended for the first two games of the 2013 season due to violating the NFL's substance-abuse policy. In Week 3, he returned from his suspension and had ten receptions for 146 yards and a touchdown in the 31–27 road victory over the Minnesota Vikings. In Week 8 against the Kansas City Chiefs, he had five receptions for 132 receiving yards and a touchdown in the 17–23 road loss. After a Week 10 bye, Gordon compiled a historic feat over the following four games. In Week 11 on the road against the Cincinnati Bengals, he had five receptions for 125 yards and a touchdown in the 20–41 road loss. In Week 12 against the Pittsburgh Steelers, Gordon caught 14 passes for 237 yards. In Week 13, Gordon made 10 receptions for season-highs in both yards (261) and touchdowns (2) against the Jacksonville Jaguars. During the 28–32 loss, at Cleveland's own 5-yard line with 4:09 left in the game and facing a 21–25 deficit at home, quarterback Brandon Weeden threw a 95-yard pass that Gordon caught, setting the longest reception of his career and a length that led the league for the season. His performance over the prior two games marked the first time in NFL history that a wide receiver had back-to-back regular season games with at least 200 receiving yards, generating the most receiving yards in two consecutive games, as he became the first 1,000-yard receiver for Cleveland since 2007. In Week 14, he had seven receptions for 151 yards and a touchdown against the New England Patriots. Gordon's four-game stretch of 774 receiving yards set an NFL record of yards tallied by any player in the same number of games, surpassing Calvin Johnson's 746 yards through Weeks 7 to 11 (with a Week 9 bye) of the same season.

On December 26, he was named the Cleveland chapter's PFWA Player of the Year following the season. The next day, Gordon was selected to his first Pro Bowl, the only of his career. He finished the 2013 season setting career-highs with 87 receptions, nine receiving touchdowns, and a league-leading 1,646 receiving yards (as well as 117.6 yards per game) in 14 games and starts. Gordon was ranked 16th by his fellow players on the NFL Top 100 Players of 2014, and he earned First Team All-Pro honors alongside Johnson.

==== 2014 season ====
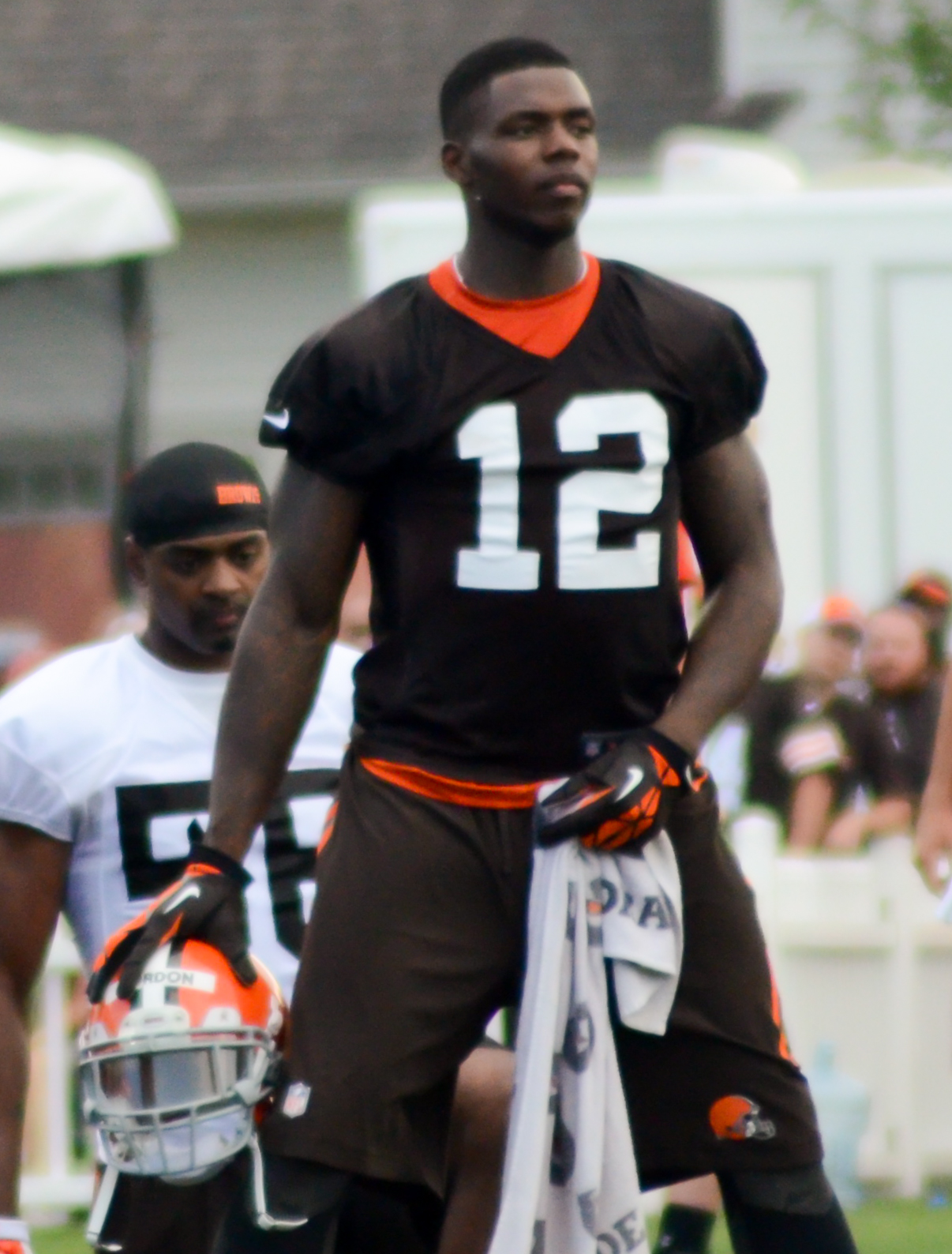
Gordon during 2014 training camp

On July 5, 2014, Gordon was arrested for driving while impaired in Raleigh, North Carolina. On August 27, Gordon acknowledged that the NFL suspended him for one year for violating the league's substance-abuse policy. On September 19, his suspension was reduced to 10 games amidst the new NFL drug testing and punishment policy. Gordon was officially reinstated on November 17. In his Week 12 season debut against the Atlanta Falcons, he made 8 receptions for a season-high 120 yards, as well as the lone fumble recovery of his career on a drive that ended in a field goal as the Browns won on the road 26–24. On December 27, exactly one year removed from being selected to the Pro Bowl, the Browns suspended Gordon from the final game of the season due to a violation of team rules. This was reported to be for missing a team walkthrough.

Due to Gordon's suspensions in the 2014 season, he appeared and started in five games and caught 24 passes for 303 yards with no touchdowns.

==== 2015 season ====
Gordon was suspended for the entire 2015 season due to violating the league's substance abuse policy. Gordon entered the NFL's substance abuse program in September 2014 after pleading guilty to a driving while impaired charge, where he was prohibited from consuming alcohol during his time in the program. The suspension was for one year starting on February 3, 2015, and he was not eligible to return until the start of the 2016 season.

==== 2016 season ====
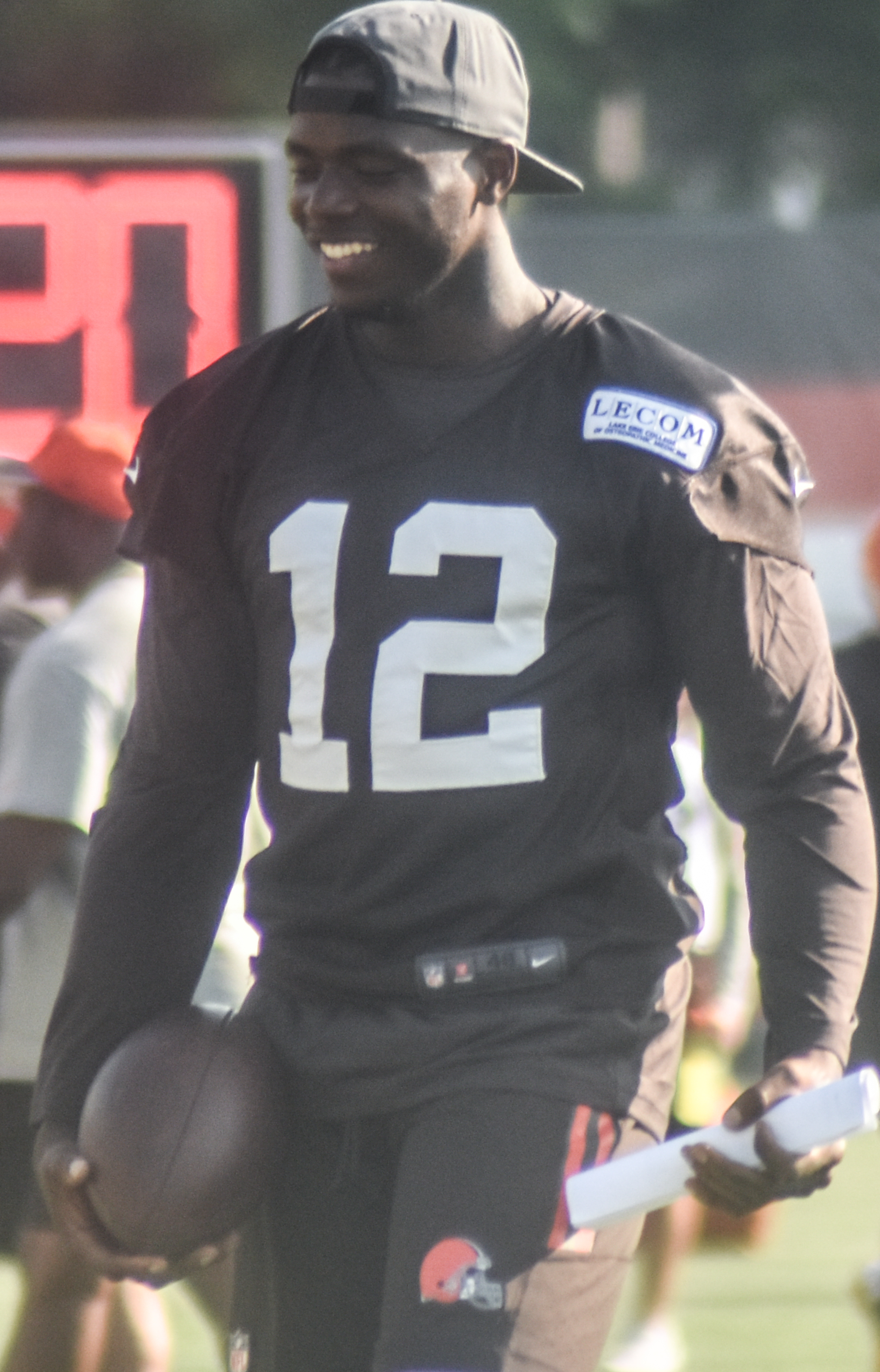
Gordon during 2016 training camp

On January 20, 2016, Gordon applied to the league for reinstatement. His request was denied in March when it was reported that he had failed another drug test. On July 25, Gordon was reinstated by the NFL on a conditional basis. He was allowed to participate in training camp, but was suspended for the first four games of the 2016 regular season. On September 29, while he was one week away from reinstatement to the NFL, Gordon left the Browns to enter an in-patient rehabilitation facility.

In a press statement, Gordon wrote, "After careful thought and deep consideration I've decided that I need to step away from pursuing my return to the Browns and my football career to enter an in-patient rehabilitation facility. This is the right decision for me and one that I hope will enable me to gain full control of my life and continue on a path to reach my full potential as a person. I appreciate the support of the NFL, NFLPA, the Browns, my teammates, my agent and the community through this extremely challenging process."

==== 2017 season ====
On March 1, 2017, Gordon again applied to the league for reinstatement, but was denied on May 11. On November 1, following Week 8, Gordon was again reinstated on a conditional basis, meaning that he would be eligible to return in Week 13. He was activated off the Commissioner's Exempt list on November 30 for the Browns' Week 13 game against the Los Angeles Chargers. He finished the game with 4 receptions for 85 yards in a 19–10 loss. The following week against the Green Bay Packers, Gordon scored his first touchdown since the 2013 season. In the season finale against the Steelers, he had four receptions for 115 yards, his first 100-yard game since his Week 12 debut of the 2014 season. He finished the 2017 season with 18 receptions for 335 yards and a touchdown in five games and starts.

==== 2018 season ====
In Week 1 of the 2018 season against the Pittsburgh Steelers, Gordon made a single 17-yard reception resulting in a touchdown with 1:58 left in the game which forced a 21–21 tie going into a scoreless overtime. On the night of September 15, the Browns indicated that they would be parting ways with Gordon after he "violated the team's trust," leaving him in Cleveland for an away game against the New Orleans Saints. It was reported that the Browns lost patience with him after he injured his hamstring in an off-field event earlier in the week.

=== New England Patriots ===
==== 2018 season ====
On September 17, 2018, the Cleveland Browns traded Gordon along with a seventh-round pick (No. 243: the Los Angeles Rams selected Nick Scott) in the 2019 NFL draft to the New England Patriots in exchange for a 2019 fifth-round pick (No. 170: Austin Seibert). In his Week 4 debut with the Patriots, Gordon caught two passes for 32 yards in a 38–7 home victory over the Miami Dolphins. In the next game against the Indianapolis Colts, Gordon caught Tom Brady's 500th NFL touchdown pass, which was also Gordon's first touchdown as a Patriot. In a Week 7 road victory of 38–31 against the Chicago Bears, Gordon recorded four receptions for 100 yards, his first 100-yard game as a Patriot. With 2 seconds left in the game, he took on defensive back duties to defend against quarterback Mitchell Trubisky's Hail Mary pass. While Gordon was unable to prevent Kevin White's reception, the latter was stopped at the one-yard line, sealing the win for New England. In Week 9, Gordon recorded five receptions for 130 yards and a 55-yard touchdown in the fourth quarter in a 31–17 win at home against the Green Bay Packers.

On December 20, following Week 15, Gordon announced that he would step away from football to focus on his mental health. Later that day, the NFL stated that Gordon would be facing an indefinite ban for violating the terms of his conditional reinstatement under their drug policy, which resulted in him being suspended for the last two games of the regular season. Gordon finished his first season with the Patriots with 40 receptions for 720 yards and three touchdowns in 11 games and starts.

Without Gordon, the Patriots reached Super Bowl LIII where they defeated the Los Angeles Rams 13–3. Although he did not play in the game because of his suspension, Gordon still received a ring for his earlier contributions to the team.

==== 2019 season ====
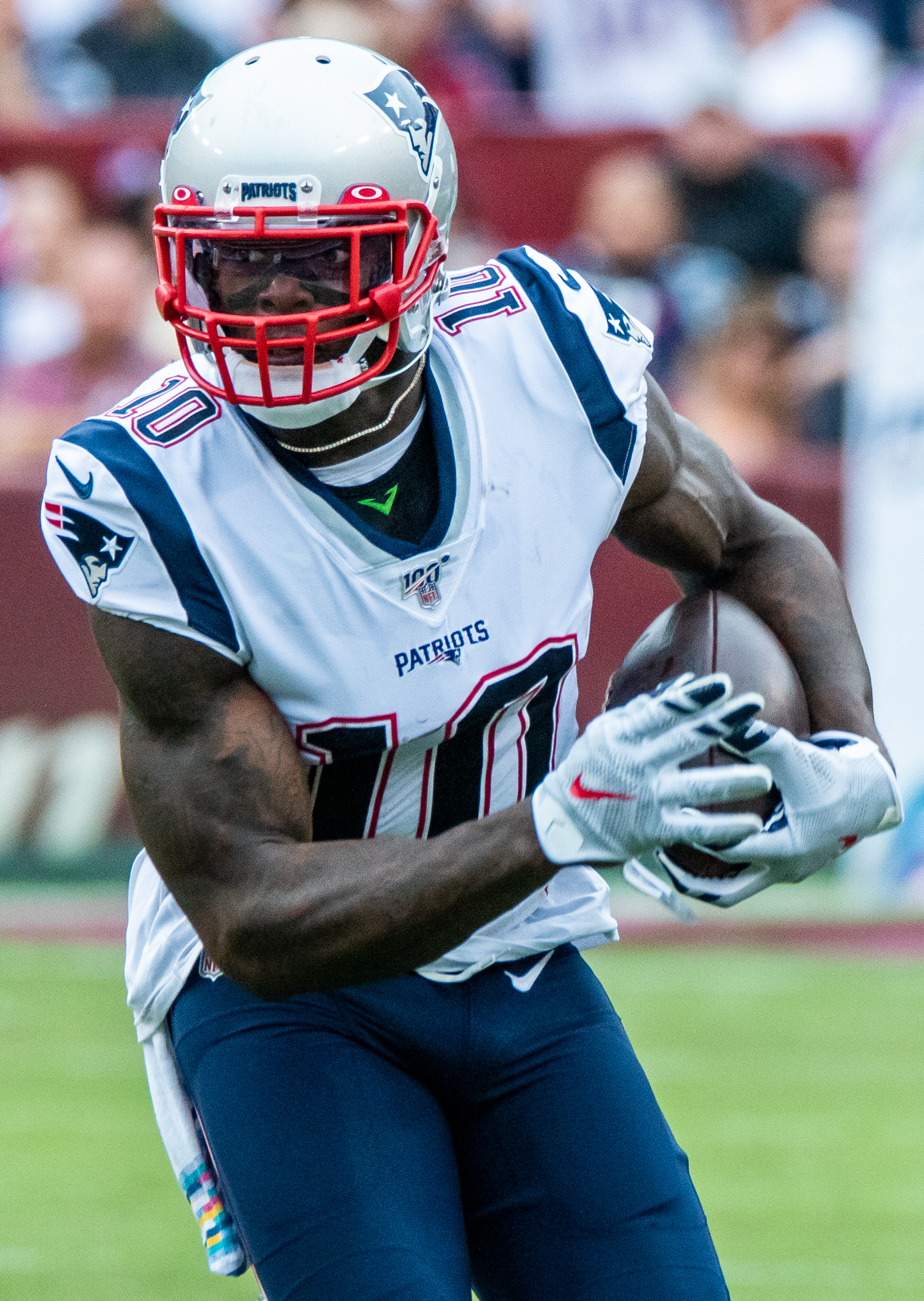
Gordon in a game against the Washington Redskins

On March 12, 2019, the Patriots placed a second-round tender on Gordon, securing his services for the upcoming season, should he be reinstated by the NFL. Gordon took to Instagram shortly after to thank the team, and reaffirm his commitment to getting back on the field. Two weeks later, during a press conference at the Governors' meeting in Arizona, NFL Commissioner Roger Goodell was asked about Gordon's status, and said that the NFL was focused on getting him "on the right track," and hopefully back on the field soon. On August 16, the NFL conditionally reinstated Gordon for the season, granting him the opportunity to play Week 1. In his season debut against the Pittsburgh Steelers, Gordon had three receptions for 73 yards and one touchdown in a 33–3 home win. On October 23, he was placed on injured reserve with a knee injury. Gordon was waived from injured reserve by the Patriots on October 31. He finished his time in New England appearing in six games and starts, catching 20 passes for 287 yards and one touchdown.

=== Seattle Seahawks ===
On November 1, 2019, Gordon was claimed off waivers by the Seattle Seahawks. In Week 15 against the Carolina Panthers, Gordon caught one pass for 58 yards and threw a pass that was intercepted by safety Tre Boston (Panthers quarterback Kyle Allen was intercepted two plays later) during the 30–24 win. On December 16, Gordon was suspended indefinitely (his fifth suspension in eight years) for violating the NFL's policy on performance-enhancing drugs and substance abuse. In his first year with the Seahawks, he made seven receptions for 139 yards with no touchdowns.

After becoming a free agent in March 2020, he re-signed with the Seahawks on September 3. He was conditionally reinstated from suspension on December 3, and the NFL announced he could be eligible to play in the last two weeks of the regular season. On December 21, Gordon was added to the Seahawks' active roster after the NFL ruled him eligible to return from his suspension. The following day, the NFL determined that Gordon had broken the terms of his conditional reinstatement, and the Seahawks were given a consecutive roster exemption for him. This was Gordon's first season not seeing play since 2016. On January 15, 2021, his conditional reinstatement was rescinded and he was handed his sixth suspension, again suspended indefinitely by the NFL. He was released by the Seahawks on March 4.

=== FCF Zappers ===
On February 27, 2021, Gordon signed with the FCF Zappers of the Fan Controlled Football League while being suspended from the NFL. In his first game, Gordon had four catches for 70 yards and a Hail Mary touchdown as time expired, helping the Zappers move to 2–2.

He played two games for the Zappers while catching seven passes for 100 yards and three touchdowns.

=== Kansas City Chiefs ===
In July 2021, Gordon applied for reinstatement from NFL suspension and was reinstated in late September. On September 28, Gordon signed with the Kansas City Chiefs practice squad, and was signed to the active roster on October 5. In Week 14 against the Las Vegas Raiders, he caught a 1-yard touchdown in the second quarter of a 48–9 win at home, his first touchdown since Week 1 of the 2019 season. On December 13 (the day after the Week 14 game), he tested positive for COVID-19 and was placed on the Reserve/COVID-19 list. He was re-activated on December 22. Gordon finished the 2021 season playing in 12 games and 7 starts, catching five passes for 32 yards and a touchdown.

On January 16, 2022, the Chiefs chose to make Gordon a healthy inactive for the Wild Card game against the Pittsburgh Steelers. On January 24, he was waived by the Chiefs and re-signed to the practice squad. He signed a reserve/future contract with the Chiefs on February 2.

On August 30, 2022, Gordon was waived by the team as part of final roster cuts.

=== Tennessee Titans ===
On September 1, 2022, Gordon was signed to the Tennessee Titans practice squad. In Week 2, Gordon made his Titans' debut against the Buffalo Bills. After two appearances with no receptions, he was released on October 17.

=== Seattle Sea Dragons ===
On January 1, 2023, the Seattle Sea Dragons selected Gordon in the sixth round of the 2023 XFL Supplemental draft. In Week 1 against the DC Defenders, Gordon had 6 receptions for 74 yards and a touchdown in the 18–22 loss. In Week 3 against the Vegas Vipers, Gordon caught a 65-yard touchdown from Ben DiNucci with 58 seconds left in the game for a 30–26 win. The Sea Dragons folded when the XFL and USFL merged to create the United Football League (UFL). On January 5, 2024, it was revealed that Gordon has no interest to return to professional spring football.

On September 26, 2024, Gordon announced his retirement.

== Career statistics ==
=== NFL ===
Legend
	Won the Super Bowl
	Led the league
**Bold**	Career high

Year	Team	Games		Receiving					Rushing					Fumbles	
Year	Team	GP	GS	Rec	Yds	Avg	Lng	TD	Att	Yds	Avg	Lng	TD	Fum	Lost
2012	CLE	**16**	13	50	805	16.1	71T	5	0	0	0	0	0	**1**	**1**
2013	CLE	14	**14**	**87**	**1,646**	18.9	**95T**	**9**	**5**	**88**	**17.6**	**34**	0	0	0
2014	CLE	5	5	24	303	12.6	32	0	0	0	0	0	0	0	0
2015	CLE	Suspended													
2016	CLE	Suspended													
2017	CLE	5	5	18	335	18.6	54	1	0	0	0	0	0	0	0
2018	CLE	1	1	1	17	17.0	17T	1	0	0	0	0	0	0	0
2018	NE	11	11	40	720	18.0	55T	3	0	0	0	0	0	0	0
2019	NE	6	6	20	287	14.4	44	1	1	1	1.0	1	0	0	0
2019	SEA	5	1	7	139	**19.9**	58	0	0	0	0	0	0	0	0
2020	SEA	Suspended													
2021	KC	12	7	5	32	6.4	11	1	0	0	0	0	0	0	0
2022	TEN	2	0	0	0	0.0	0	0	0	0	0	0	0	0	0
Career		77	63	252	4,284	17.0	95T	21	6	89	14.8	34	0	1	1

=== FCF ===
Year	League	Team	Games		Receiving					Rushing					Fumbles	
Year	League	Team	GP	GS	Rec	Yds	Avg	Lng	TD	Att	Yds	Avg	Lng	TD	Fum	Lost
2021	FCF	Zappers	2	2	7	100	14.3	30	3	0	0	0	0	0	0	0

=== XFL ===
Year	League	Team	Games		Receiving						Rushing					Fumbles	
Year	League	Team	GP	GS	Rec	TGTs	Yds	Avg	Lng	TD	Att	Yds	Avg	Lng	TD	Fum	Lost
2023	XFL	SEA	10	5	38	64	540	14.2	65	4	0	0	0	0	0	0	0

=== College ===
Season	Team	GP	Receiving				
Season	Team	GP	Rec	Yds	Avg	Lng	TD
2009	Baylor	9	1	7	7.0	7	0
2010	Baylor	13	42	714	17.0	94	7
Career		22	43	721	16.8	94	7

== Career highlights ==
=== Awards and honors ===
- Super Bowl champion (LIII)
- First-team All-Pro (2013)
- Pro Bowl (2013)
- NFL receiving yards leader (2013)
- Ranked No. 16 in the Top 100 Players of 2014

=== Records ===
==== NFL records ====
- Most consecutive games, 200+ yards receiving: 2 (November 24, 2013, 237 yards; December 1, 2013, 261 yards)

==== Browns franchise records ====
- Most receptions, game: 14 on (November 24, 2013, against the Pittsburgh Steelers; tied with Ozzie Newsome, 1984)
- Most receiving yards, season: 1,646 yards (2013)
- Most receiving yards per game, season: 117.6 (2013)
- 100+ receiving yard games, season: 7 (2013)
