= Jack Sachse =

American football player (1921–1988)

- Sachse in 1942

No. 30
- Positions: Linebacker, center, guard

Personal information
- Born: January 15, 1921; Wichita Falls, Texas, U.S.
- Died: March 1, 1988 (aged 67); Vincennes, Indiana, U.S.
- Listed height: 6 ft 0 in (1.83 m)
- Listed weight: 210 lb (95 kg)

Career information
- High school: Electra
- College: Southwestern (TX); Texas
- NFL draft: 1944: 8th round, 67th overall pick

Career history
- Boston Yanks (1945)

Awards and highlights
- Southwest Conference Champion (1942, 1943); 1943 Cotton Bowl Classic Champion; Co-winner 1944 Cotton Bowl Classic

Career NFL statistics
- Games played: 4
- Starts: 1
- Stats at Pro Football Reference

Jack Clarence Sachse (January 15, 1921 – March 1, 1988) was an American professional football linebacker, center and guard who played college football at Texas and briefly in the NFL.

== Biography ==
Sachse was born January 15, 1921, in Wichita Falls, Texas.

== Football player ==
Sachse attended the University of Texas in Austin, where he played center and guard. In his freshman year, the Longhorns went 8-1-1 and finished the year ranked #4 (later "winning" the National championship in the Berryman QPRS, James Howell and Williamson Systems). In his sophomore year he helped the Longhorns win the Southwest Conference Championship and the Cotton Bowl and then they repeated it the next year, except that the Cotton Bowl ended in a tie. In his Senior year he led the team in interceptions with 4. While still in school he was drafted with the 67th overall pick by the Brooklyn Tigers in the 1944 NFL draft.

He played in the 1945 East-West Shrine Game and was then went on to play in just four games of the 1945 season.

== Later life ==
Sachse served in World War II as a Marine. He was a football coach at Hardin College in Wichita Falls, TX and at Taft and Bonham High Schools in Texas. He later worked as a welding inspector with the Michigan Department of Transportation and was chairman of the Vincennes Housing Authority.

He died in Vincennes, Indiana in 1988.
