= Malcolm Kutner =

American football player (1921–2005)

Mal Kutner
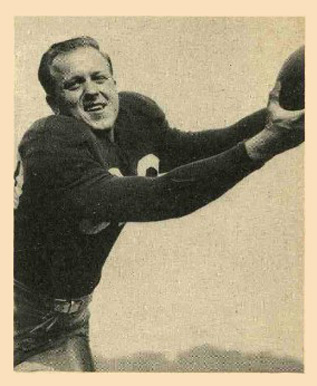

No. 80
- Positions: End, defensive back

Personal information
- Born: March 27, 1921; Dallas, Texas, U.S.
- Died: February 4, 2005 (aged 83); Tyler, Texas, U.S.
- Listed height: 6 ft 2 in (1.88 m)
- Listed weight: 197 lb (89 kg)

Career information
- High school: Woodrow Wilson (Dallas)
- College: Texas (1938–1941)
- NFL draft: 1942: 4th round, 26th overall pick

Career history
- Chicago Cardinals (1946–1950)

Awards and highlights
- NFL champion (1947); First-team All-Pro (1948); Second-team All-Pro (1947); 2× NFL receiving yards leader (1947, 1948); NFL receiving touchdowns leader (1948); First-team All-American (1941); First-team All-SWC (1941); Second-team All-SWC (1940); Texas Sports Hall of Fame; Southwest Conference Champion (Track) – 1940, 1941, 1942; Southwest Conference Champion (4x100 Relay) – 1941, 1942; 1941 National College Football Champion (Berryman QPRS, James Howell, Williamson System)

Career NFL statistics
- Receptions: 145
- Receiving yards: 3,060
- Receiving touchdowns: 31
- Interceptions: 13
- Stats at Pro Football Reference
- College Football Hall of Fame

Malcolm James "Mal" Kutner (March 27, 1921 – February 4, 2005) was an American professional football end in the National Football League (NFL).

== Early life ==
Kutner first became involved with football during his young years growing up in Dallas, Texas with the "SMU Midgets", a children's football team that played on the campus of Southern Methodist University. He graduated from Wilson High School in 1938 and in 1990, he was inducted into Wilson's Hall of Fame.

He played college football at the University of Texas (as end, tackle and halfback) where he was an AP All-American in 1941, the first ever Longhorn to earn first-team All-American honors in program history. The final game of his college career ended with a 71–7 victory over Oregon on December 6, 1941. That team spend part of the season ranked #1 in the Nation and finished ranked #4 with some retroactive systems naming that team the National Champion. He was pictured on the cover of Life Magazine that season, and was the first UT player chosen to play with the collegiate team in the Chicago All-Star Game against the NFL champions.

He was an also an All-American in basketball along with lettering in track, which won Southwestern Conference team titles in 1940, 1941 and 1942 with him on the conference champion relay team twice.

== Professional career ==
He was drafted by the Pittsburgh Steelers in the fourth round of the 1942 NFL draft but elected to serve in the Navy as an aviator for the duration of World War II. He served until the end of the war in 1945. During his time in the service he played football with the 1942 Iowa Pre-Flight Seahawks football team.

He joined the pros with the Chicago Cardinals for the 1946 season and earned Rookie of the Year honors. He caught 27 passes for 634 yards as a rookie for five touchdowns, with his first score being in his first game and first catch on a 59-yard pass vs Detroit. He also recorded five interceptions as a defensive back, three of which came against Green Bay on November 24.

In 1947, he led the league in receiving yards and yards per game, was named a 2nd team All-Pro selection and helped his team with the NFL Championship. He caught 43 passes for 944 yards and seven touchdowns to go with three interceptions. In the playoffs, he was used as a returner for one play, getting 11 yards while Chicago won 28–21 in the NFL title game over the Philadelphia Eagles.

In 1948, he again led the league in receiving yards and yards per game, as well as TD receptions, and was named a 1st team All-Pro selection. He caught 41 passes for 943 yards and 14 touchdowns. He had his only three-touchdown game on October 17 against the New York Giants, doing so on six catches for 128 yards in the 63–35 victory. He was the last Cardinal to lead the NFL in receiving yards until 1984. In the NFL title game rematch, he caught one pass for 13 yards (one of just three completed catches by Cardinal receivers all day) in the 7–0 loss.

The following year, he caught 30 passes for 465 yards for five touchdowns. He played just five games in 1950, recording four total catches to go with three interceptions.

Kutner was inducted into the University of Texas Men's Athletics Hall of Honor in 1965. He was inducted into the National Football Foundation's College Hall of Fame in 1974 and into the Texas Sports Hall of Fame in 1990.

== NFL career statistics ==
Legend
	Won the NFL Championship
	Led the league
**Bold**	Career high

Year	Team	Games		Receiving				
Year	Team	GP	GS	Rec	Yds	Avg	Lng	TD
1946	CRD	11	5	27	634	**23.5**	63	5
1947	CRD	12	9	**43**	**944**	22.0	70	7
1948	CRD	12	10	41	**943**	23.0	**71**	**14**
1949	CRD	12	12	30	465	15.5	49	5
1950	CRD	9	9	4	74	18.5	51	0
		56	45	145	3,060	21.1	71	31

== Personal life ==
After leaving the NFL, he became involved in the oil business in Texas, retiring as an executive vice president of C&K Petroleum by 1983. He died in 2005 at the age of 83 after an extended illness. He was survived by his wife and three children.
