= Chal Daniel =

American football player (1921–1943)

Profile
- Position: Guard

Personal information
- Born: August 31, 1921; El Paso, Texas, U.S.
- Died: February 13, 1943 (aged 21); Comal County, Texas, U.S.

Career information
- College: Texas
- NFL draft: 1942: 6th round, 44th overall pick

Awards and highlights
- First-team All-American (1941); First-team All-SWC (1941)

Chal Newton Daniel Jr. (August 31, 1921 – February 13, 1943) was an All-American football player who was drafted by the Cardinals in the 6th Round of the 1942 NFL Draft, but he went to serve in World War II instead and died in a training flight.

Daniel was born in El Paso, Texas, in 1921. He moved with his family to Longview, Texas, in 1932. He was a star on the football team at Longview High School, and as a senior in 1937 he played guard on Longview's state championship team. He was one of two guards named to the Associated Press's 1937 Texas all-state first team.

== College career ==
He played college football for the Texas Longhorns football team from 1939 to 1941. In 1940, he made the All-Southwest Conference 2nd team. He was one of the so-called "Immortal 13" who upset defending national champion Texas A&M 7–0 on Thanksgiving Day. Daniel started at right guard against A&M and played the entire game on both offense and defense.

He was 20 years old when he was a senior on UT's 1941 team, which went 8–1–1, spent two weeks ranked #1 and finished 4th in the final Associated Press (AP) poll. This was the first Longhorn team to finish a season ranked by the AP. Several computer ranking systems later declared the team "National Champions", but Texas has never claimed that title.

During the 1941 season, the Texas Longhorn football program was the subject of an article in the November 17, 1941 issue of Life Magazine, and Daniel was one of fourteen Longhorn players whose photos were featured on that issue's cover. That year he made the All-Southwest Conference 1st team and he was selected by the International News Service, the Sporting News, and the Central Press Association as a first-team guard on the 1941 All-America football team. He was the first ever, 1st team All-American from the University of Texas.

After his senior year, he played in the 1942 East–West Shrine Bowl for college all-stars.

In 1970, he was inducted into the Longhorn Hall of Honor.

== Military ==
Daniel was drafted by the Chicago Cardinals in the 6th round of the 1942 NFL draft (#44 overall) but instead enlisted in the United States Army Air Corps in February 1942 during World War II. He went to flight school at Randolph Field; Basic Flight School in Pine Bluff, Arkansas; and advanced flight training at Kelly Field in San Antonio. He was awarded his pilot's wings and commissioned as a Lieutenant.

On February 13, 1943, the Vultee BT-13 Valiant trainer aircraft that he and his co-pilot had flown out of Randolph Field in San Antonio disappeared. After a five-day search the aircraft, and his remains, were found eight miles north of New Braunfels, Texas.

A road at Camp Fannin outside of Tyler was renamed in his honor a few months later, but the road and name did not remain after the camp was closed.
