= Daryl Cato =

American football player (1920–1970)

- Daryl Cato, c. 1939

Profile
- Position: Center

Personal information
- Born: January 8, 1920; Lonoke, Arkansas, U.S.
- Died: October 3, 1970 (aged 50); Houston, Texas, U.S.
- Listed height: 6 ft 2 in (1.88 m)
- Listed weight: 195 lb (88 kg)

Career information
- High school: Lonoke (AR)
- College: Arkansas

Career history
- Miami Seahawks (1946)

Awards and highlights
- Second-team All-SWC (1941)
- Stats at Pro Football Reference

Ralph Daryl Cato (January 8, 1920 – October 3, 1970) was an American football center.

Cato was born in Lonoke, Arkansas in 1920 and attended Lonoke High School. He played college football for Arkansas. He was selected by the Associated Press and United Press as the second-team center on the 1941 All-Southwest Conference football team.

He played professional football in the All-America Football Conference for the Miami Seahawks in 1946. He appeared in a total of 12 professional games, three of them as a starter.

He died in 1970.
