= Nocona Independent School District =

School district in Texas, United States

Nocona Independent School District is a public school district based in Nocona, Texas (USA). Nocona ISD provides more than the standard K-12 curriculum. NISD offers extended opportunities for students ranging from Head Start for very young children to college dual credit courses via distance learning for high school students. NISD also hosts a county facility, the Montague County Special Classes Coop, that serves special-needs students.

Nocona ISD is a rural school in north central Texas with approximately 900 students. The district is supported by the community of Nocona, TX in which over 3000 persons reside. The district and community have been growing slowly over the past decade. However, the community is in the pathway of rapid population growth to the south and east. In 2009, the school district was rated "academically acceptable" by the Texas Education Agency.

== Schools ==
- Nocona High School (Grades 9-12)
- Nocona Middle School (Grades 6-8)
- Nocona Elementary School (Grades PK-5)
