= Noble Doss =

American football player (1920–2009)

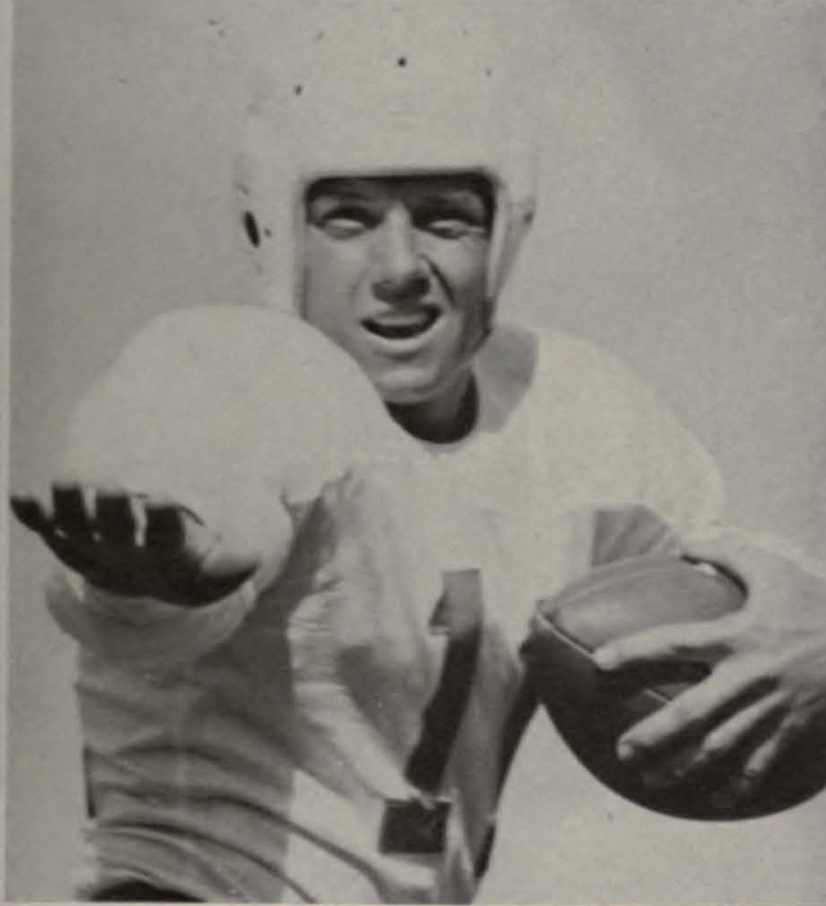
- Doss with the Longhorns in 1941

No. 45, 83
- Position: Halfback

Personal information
- Born: May 22, 1920; Temple, Texas, U.S.
- Died: February 15, 2009 (aged 88); Austin, Texas, U.S.
- Listed height: 6 ft 0 in (1.83 m)
- Listed weight: 186 lb (84 kg)

Career information
- High school: Temple
- College: Texas
- NFL draft: 1942: 11th round, 93rd overall pick

Career history
- Philadelphia Eagles (1947–1948); New York Yankees (1949)

Awards and highlights
- NFL champion (1948)

Career NFL statistics
- Rushing yards: 253
- Rushing average: 3.2
- Receptions: 10
- Receiving yards: 113
- Stats at Pro Football Reference

Noble Webster Doss (May 22, 1920 – February 15, 2009) was an American professional football player who was a halfback for the Philadelphia Eagles of the National Football League (NFL) and the New York Yankees of the All-America Football Conference (AAFC). He played college football for the Texas Longhorns. He was drafted by the Eagles in the 11th round of the 1942 NFL draft (#93 overall).

== Early life ==
Doss was born in Temple, Texas and played high school football at Temple High School.

He was named to the Texas High School Sports Hall of Fame in 1995.

== College career ==
Doss played in the 1946 Chicago Charities College All-Star Game.

=== The "impossible catch" ===
On November 28, 1940 during the annual Texas-Texas A&M game at Memorial stadium, Doss caught an over-the-head pass on the 3rd play of the game that set up a 1 yard rushing touchdown by Pete Layden on the next play. Deemed the "impossible catch" by fans due to the length of the pass and nature of the catch, this was the only scoring drive of the game. The 7-0 victory over the Aggies prevented them from back-to-back National Championship seasons and knocked them out of a Rose bowl appearance.
