= 1941 All-Southwest Conference football team =

American college football all-star team

The 1941 All-Southwest Conference football team consists of American football players chosen by various organizations for All-Southwest Conference teams for the 1941 college football season. The selectors for the 1941 season included the Associated Press (AP) and the United Press (UP).

The 1941 Texas A&M Aggies football team won the conference championship, was ranked No. 9 in the final AP Poll, and placed four players on the first team: back Derace Moser (AP-1, UP-1); ends James Sterling (AP-1, UP-1); tackle Martin Ruby (AP-1, UP-1); and center Bill Sibley (AP-1, UP-1).

The 1941 Texas Longhorns football team was ranked No. 4 in the final AP Poll and also placed four players on the first team: backs Jack Crain and Pete Layden (AP-1, UP-1); end Malcolm Kutner (AP-1, UP-1); and guard Chal Daniel (AP-1, UP-1).

== All Southwest selections ==
=== Backs ===
- Pete Layden, Texas (AP-1; UP-1)
- Pres Johnston, SMU (AP-1; UP-1)
- Derace Moser, Texas A&M (AP-1; UP-1) (Southwest Conference MVP, 1941)
- Jack Crain, Texas (AP-1; UP-1)
- Jack Wilson, Baylor (AP-2, UP-2)
- Vernon Martin, Texas (AP-2, UP-2)
- Milton Crain, Baylor (AP-2, UP-2)
- Kyle Gillespie, TCU (AP-2)
- Bob Brumley, Rice (UP-2)

=== Ends ===
- James Sterling, Texas A&M (AP-1; UP-1)
- Malcolm Kutner, Texas (AP-1; UP-1) (College Football Hall of Fame)
- Bruce Alford Sr., TCU (AP-2, UP-2)
- Bill Henderson, Texas A&M (AP-2)
- Jack Russell, Baylor (UP-2)

=== Tackles ===
- Derrell Palmer, TCU (AP-1; UP-1)
- Martin Ruby, Texas A&M (AP-1; UP-1) (College Football Hall of Fame)
- Jeff Coats, Arkansas (AP-2, UP-2)
- Julian Garrett, Texas (AP-2, UP-2)

=== Guards ===
- Chal Daniel, Texas (AP-1; UP-1)
- Art Goforth, Rice (AP-1)
- Ted Ramsey, SMU (AP-2, UP-1)
- Buddy Jungmichel, Texas (AP-2, UP-2)
- Art Goforth, Rice (UP-2)

=== Centers ===
- Bill Sibley, Texas A&M (AP-1; UP-1)
- Daryl Cato, Arkansas (AP-2, UP-2)

== Key ==
AP = Associated Press

UP = United Press

Bold = Consensus first-team selection of both the AP and UP

== See also ==
- 1941 College Football All-America Team
