= Pete Layden =

American football and baseball player (1919–1982)

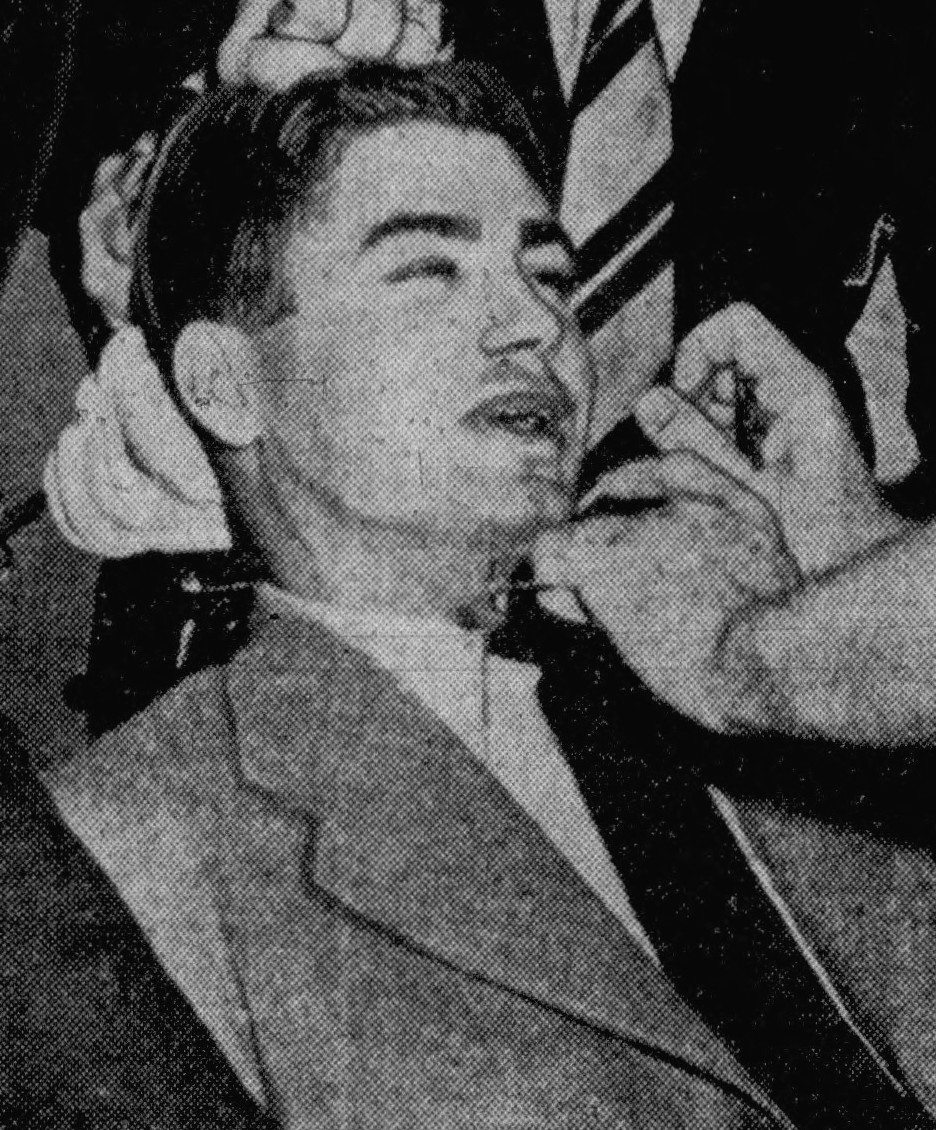
- Layden, circa 1942

No. 84, 62, 17
- Position: Quarterback

Personal information
- Born: December 30, 1919; Dallas, Texas, U.S.
- Died: July 18, 1982 (aged 62); Edna, Texas, U.S.
- Listed height: 5 ft 11 in (1.80 m)
- Listed weight: 192 lb (87 kg)

Career information
- High school: W. H. Adamson (Dallas)
- College: Texas (1938–1941)
- NFL draft: 1942: 14th round, 128th overall pick

Career history
- New York Yankees (1948–1949); New York Yanks (1950)

Awards and highlights
- 2× First-team All-SWC (1940, 1941)

Career NFL + AAFC statistics
- TD–INT: 9–9
- Passing yards: 841
- QB rating: 58.6
- Stats at Pro Football Reference

Pete Layden
- Centerfielder
- Batted: Right Threw: Right

MLB debut
- April 20, 1948, for the St. Louis Browns

Last MLB appearance
- July 15, 1948, for the St. Louis Browns

MLB statistics
- Batting average: .250
- Home runs: 0
- Runs batted in: 4
- Stats at Baseball Reference

Teams
- St. Louis Browns (1948)

John Peter Layden Jr. (December 30, 1919 – July 18, 1982) was an American two-sport professional athlete who played outfield in Major League Baseball and an assortment of positions in football. He was an outfielder for the St. Louis Browns and a quarterback, running back, cornerback, kick returner, punt returner, and punter for the New York Yankees of the All-America Football Conference (AAFC) and the New York Yanks of the National Football League (NFL).

In 1948, Layden played in 41 major league baseball games with the St. Louis Browns. He posted a .250 batting average (26-for-104) with 11 runs, 2 doubles, 1 triple, no home runs, 4 RBIs, 4 stolen bases, and 6 bases on balls. Defensively, he recorded a .973 fielding percentage as an outfielder with 2 errors in 74 total chances.

From 1948 to 1950 he played professional football in the AAFL and the NFL and in 1949 led the AAFL in punt returns (29) and interceptions returned for a TD (1).

His father had been a college football player and later a football coach.

== College career ==
Layden was a two-sport star at the University of Texas where he played fullback for the football team and outfield for the baseball team.

In football, he led the team in scoring (1940), passing (1939–40) and rushing (1940–41); captained the team in 1941 – when they finished the season ranked #4 – and was a two-time All-Southwest Conference (SWC) selection in 1940 and 1941.

In baseball, he played on three SWC championship teams (1939–41) (before the college world series/NCAA Division I Baseball Championship existed) and in 1941 led the conference in hitting and made All-SWC.

In 1961 he was admitted to the University of Texas Hall of Honor.

== Professional career ==
Layden was drafted by the New York Giants in the 14th round of the 1942 NFL Draft. He instead went to serve U.S. Army Air Corps for four years during World War II.

He started his professional baseball career in 1946, moving up the major leagues with the St. Louis Browns for part of the 1948 season. He spent part of the season after that with the San Antonio Missions.

He then moved to football, playing 2 years with the New York Yankees of the AAFC, a challenger to the NFL that was partially absorbed by the NFL. During that time he played with fellow former Longhorn, and future Hall of Famer, Tom Landry and helped the team to the playoffs in 1949.

In 1950, the Yankees merged with the New York Bulldogs and became the NFL's New York Yanks and Layden played his last games with them, after moving to Left Defensive Halfback.

== Later life ==
Layden became a rancher in Jackson County, Texas. During that time he spent 10 years as a county commissioner.

He died in his sleep at his home at age 62, apparently from a heart attack, and is buried at the Layden Family Cemetery in Edna, Texas.
