= 1941 VPI Gobblers football team =

American college football season

1941 VPI Gobblers football
- Conference: Southern Conference
- Record: 6–4 (4–2 SoCon)
- Head coach: Jimmy Kitts (1st season)
- Captains: Bill Tate; Bill Zydiak
- Home stadium: Miles Stadium

1941 Southern Conference football standings
	Conf.					Overall
Team	W		L		T	W		L		T
No. 2 Duke +	5	–	0	–	0	9	–	1	–	0
South Carolina +	4	–	0	–	1	4	–	4	–	1
Clemson	5	–	1	–	0	7	–	2	–	0
William & Mary	4	–	1	–	0	8	–	2	–	0
VMI	4	–	2	–	0	4	–	6	–	0
VPI	4	–	2	–	0	6	–	4	–	0
Wake Forest	4	–	2	–	1	5	–	5	–	1
NC State	3	–	4	–	2	4	–	5	–	2
Furman	2	–	3	–	2	3	–	4	–	2
Washington and Lee	1	–	2	–	2	1	–	6	–	2
North Carolina	2	–	4	–	0	3	–	7	–	0
Maryland	1	–	2	–	0	3	–	5	–	1
Davidson	1	–	5	–	2	1	–	6	–	3
The Citadel	0	–	2	–	1	4	–	3	–	1
George Washington	0	–	4	–	1	1	–	7	–	1
Richmond	0	–	6	–	0	2	–	7	–	0
+ – Conference co-champions; Rankings from AP Poll

The 1941 VPI Gobblers football team was an American football team that represented Virginia Agricultural and Mechanical College and Polytechnic Institute in Southern Conference during the 1941 college football season. In their first season under head coach Jimmy Kitts, the Gobblers compiled a 6–4 record (4–2 against conference opponents), tied for fifth place in the conference, and were outscored by a total of 120 to 112.

VPI was ranked at No. 102 (out of 681 teams) in the final rankings under the Litkenhous Difference by Score System for 1941.

Guard Roger McClure as selected by both the Associated Press and the United Press as a second-team player on the 1941 All-Southern Conference football team.

Guard John Maskas was selected by the Boston Yanks in the 14th round (142nd overall pick) of the 1944 NFL draft. Maskas became the first VPI player to play in the NFL, appearing in 18 games for the Buffalo Bills in 1947 and 1949.

== Schedule ==
Date	Time	Opponent	Site	Result	Attendance	Source
September 20		Catawba*	Miles Stadium; Blacksburg, VA	W 22–2	4,500	
September 27		vs. Kentucky*	Manual Stadium; Louisville, KY	L 14–37	8,000-8,500	
October 4	3:00 p.m.	Georgetown*^{†}	Miles Stadium; Blacksburg, VA	W 3–0	5,000-7,500	
October 11		vs. William & Mary	City Stadium; Richmond, VA	L 7–16	12,000	
October 18	2:30 p.m.	at Davidson	Richardson Stadium; Davidson, NC	W 16–0	5,000	
October 25	2:30 p.m.	vs. Washington and Lee	Lynchburg Municipal Stadium; Lynchburg, VA	W 13–3	6,000	
November 1	2:30 p.m.	vs. Virginia*	Foreman Field; Norfolk, VA (rivalry)	L 0–34	15,000	
November 8	2:30 p.m.	vs. NC State	Bowman Gray Stadium; Winston-Salem, NC	W 14–13	10,000	
November 20	2:15 p.m.	vs. VMI	Lynchburg Municipal Stadium; Lynchburg, VA (rivalry)	L 10–15	19,000-20,000	
November 29	2:30 p.m.	Richmond	Miles Stadium; Blacksburg, VA	W 13–0	4,000	
*Non-conference game; ^{†}Homecoming; All times are in Eastern time

== Before the season ==
The 1940 VPI Gobblers football team compiled a 5–5 record and were led by Henry Redd in his ninth season as head coach. On November 20, 1940, Redd announced that he would resign as VPI head coach to become full-time secretary of the General Alumni Association and the director of the Tech Alumni Fund. After considering other coaches to fill the vacancy (reportedly including Bunny Oakes and John Barnhill), former Rice head coach Jimmy Kitts accepted the VPI head coaching position on February 13, 1941.

In December 1940, the VPI letterwinners chose linemen Bill Tate and Bill Zydiak as co-captains for the 1941 football season.

VPI held a spring game on April 19, 1941. The result was a 26–7 victory over Appalachian State Teachers College, with the Gobblers scoring three touchdowns in the third quarter.

== Game summaries ==
=== Catawba ===
Catawba at VPI

Team	1	2	3	4	Total
Catawba	0	0	0	2	2
• VPI	7	9	6	0	22

- Date: September 20, 1941
- Location: Miles Stadium
  Blacksburg, VA
- Game attendance: 4,500

VPI's first game of the season was a victory over Catawba at Miles Stadium. In the first quarter, VPI's Jack Gallagher completed a 46-yard pass to Gene Wheeler for the game's first touchdown, with Roger McClure kicking the extra point. In the second quarter, Gobblers fullback Mason Blandford did a 70-yard quick kick that stopped at the one-yard line and set up a touchdown by Jim Lively. Ben Judy also scored in the second quarter, completing a safety against Catawba quarterback Dwight Holshouser. VPI had another 70-yard quick kick, this time by Bobby Smith, in the third quarter that set up a touchdown by Bill Tate. Catawba scored their only points in the fourth quarter, when Steve Johnson tackled Lively for a safety. VPI finished the game with 49 yards rushing and 124 yards passing, while Catawba finished with 36 yards rushing and 147 yards passing. VPI also recorded five interceptions.

The starting lineup for VPI was: Johnson (left end), Maskas (left tackle), W. Tate (left guard), Zydiak (center), McClure (right guard), Judy (right tackle), Chasen (right end), James (quarterback), Kern (left halfback), Wheeler (right halfback), Blandford (fullback). The substitutes were: Clark, Davis, Fuller, Gallagher, Kujawa, Lawson, Lively, Rucker, Sharpe, Smith, B. Tate, Unterzuber, Warner and Wilson.

The starting lineup for Catawba was: Donald Hanley (left end), George Haley (left tackle), Hubert Menapace (left guard), Ed Ellis (center), Clayton Gaddy (right guard), William Rodeffer (right tackle), Steve Johnson (right end), Dwight Holshouser (quarterback), Anthony Georgiana (left halfback), Louis Green (right halfback), Crayton Benson Jr. (fullback). The substitutes were: Duke Burkholder, R. Culton, Feemster, L. Hunter, R. Ravaschire, K. Rhodes, Army Tomaini, Ray Yagiello and S. Whitener.

=== Kentucky ===
Kentucky vs. VPI

Team	1	2	3	4	Total
VPI	0	0	0	14	14
• Kentucky	13	12	6	6	37

- Date: September 27, 1941
- Location: Manual Stadium
  Louisville, KY
- Game attendance: 8,000-8,500
- Game weather: "Hot"

The second game was against Kentucky at the neutral Manual Stadium in Louisville, Kentucky. Kentucky started the scoring on the third play of the game when Ermal Allen rushed for a 38-yard touchdown with Junie Jones making the extra point. Later in the first quarter, the Wildcats' Bill Portwood blocked a VPI punt and Kentucky then scored on a one-yard rushing touchdown by Billy Kincer. In the second quarter, Kentucky's Noah Mullins intercepted a pass by VPI's Billy James and then Carl Althaus caught an 18-yard touchdown pass from Phil Cutchin. Cutchin missed the extra point. At the end of the first half, Wildcat Claude Hammond rushed for a four-yard touchdown and Cutchin's extra point attempt was blocked by VPI. After halftime, the Wildcats' Charley Bill Walker recovered a VPI fumble and Jones rushed for a 32-yard touchdown. In the fourth quarter, VPI's Jim Lively recorded two touchdown catches. The first was a ten-yard catch with Roger McClure kicking the extra point. Lively's second touchdown was a 65-yard pass from Bobby Smith with McClure kicking the extra point. Kentucky scored a final time, another pass from Cutchin to Althaus. VPI finished the game with 38 yards rushing and 208 yards passing, while Kentucky finished with 279 yards rushing and 102 yards passing.

The starting lineup for VPI was: Chasen (left end), Judy (left tackle), Rucker (left guard), Zydiak (center), McClure (right guard), Maskas (right tackle), W. Johnson (right end), Kern (quarterback), James (left halfback), Wheeler (right halfback), Blandford (fullback). The substitutes were: Lively, Smith and Wilson.

The starting lineup for Kentucky was: Bill Portwood (left end), Clyde Johnson (left tackle), Norm Beck (left guard), Charley Walker (center), Jack Casner (right guard), Clark Wood (right tackle), Allen Parr (right end), Tommy Zinn (quarterback), Noah Mullins (left halfback), Ermal Allen (right halfback), Billy Kincer (fullback). The substitutes were: Carl Althaus, Bob Beeler, Don Boehler, Phil Cutchin, Claude Hammond, Junie Jones and Charley Kuhn.

=== Georgetown ===
Georgetown at VPI

Team	1	2	3	4	Total
Georgetown	0	0	0	0	0
• VPI	0	0	3	0	3

- Date: October 4, 1941
- Location: Miles Stadium
  Blacksburg, VA
- Game start: 3:00 p.m.
- Game attendance: 5,000-7,500

VPI's 1941 homecoming game was an upset victory over Georgetown. In the third quarter, Gobbler Bobby Smith punted to Hoya Frank Dornfeld who then fumbled the ball, which Smith recovered. VPI's Roger McClure then kicked a 25-yard field goal, the only points for either side during the game. Near the end of the game, Gobbler Dick Kern fumbled at their own 18-yard line, which was recovered by Georgetown's Ben Reiges. But Georgetown could not take advantage of the field position and turned it over on downs. Georgetown was held scoreless for the first time since 1937. VPI finished the game with 93 yards rushing and 21 yards passing, while Georgetown finished with 51 yards rushing and 40 yards passing.

The starting lineup for VPI was: Chasen (left end), Lawson (left tackle), McClure (left guard), Zydiak (center), R. Anderson (right guard), Judy (right tackle), W. Johnson (right end), Kern (quarterback), James (left halfback), Wheeler (right halfback), Smith (fullback). The substitutes were: Blandford, Clark, Davis, Fuller, Gallagher, T. Johnson, Lively, Maskas, McClure, Rucker, Sharpe, B. Tate, Unterzuber and Wilson.

The starting lineup for Georgetown was: Bob Duffey (left end), George Perpich (left tackle), Edward McMahon (left guard), Edward Derringe (center), Angelo Paternoster (right guard), Al Blozis (right tackle), Al Lujack (right end), Edward Agnew (quarterback), Jack Doolan (left halfback), Ben Bulvin (right halfback), Louis Falcone (fullback). The substitutes were: Frank Dornfield, Bill Erickson, Joe Gyorgydeak, Oscar Harte, Chris Pavich, Tom Ponsalle, Ben Reiges, Russ Sorce, Garry Wilkin and Alfred Yukna.

=== William & Mary ===
William & Mary vs VPI

Team	1	2	3	4	Total
VPI	0	0	7	0	7
• W & M	0	10	6	0	16

- Date: October 11, 1941
- Location: City Stadium
  Richmond, VA
- Game attendance: 12,000

VPI's game with William & Mary was played at City Stadium in Richmond, Virginia in front of approximately 12,000 fans. W&M's Jack Freeman had two interceptions in the first half, both of which led to scoring drives. W&M's first touchdown was a four-yard run by Jimmy Howard with Harvey Johnson kicking the extra point. The Indians scored again when Johnson kicked a 16-yard field goal at the end of the first half, after missing a field goal wide-right in the first quarter. In the third quarter, VPI had a 63-yard drive that ended with their only points of the game, a one-yard run by Mason Blandford with Roger McClure kicking the extra point. Later in the third quarter, VPI's Jim Lively returned a punt, but was pushed back to VPI's one-yard line. VPI eventually punted and the Indians took over at the Gobblers' 34-yard line. Johnny Korczowski then completed a 30-yard pass to Johnson, and on the next play Korczowski rushed four yards for a touchdown. In the fourth quarter, Freeman fumbled a punt on W&M's 16-yard line. However, the Gobblers were only able to advance to the nine-yard line and did not score. Later in the fourth quarter, the Indians were penalized for clipping and turned the ball over to VPI on W&M's 21-yard line. But again the Gobblers could not score after getting to the 2-yard line.

The starting lineup for VPI was: W. Johnson (left end), Lawson (left tackle), Fuller (left guard), Zydiak (center), R. Anderson (right guard), Judy (right tackle), Chasen (right end), Kern (quarterback), James (left halfback), Wheeler (right halfback), Smith (fullback). The substitutes were: Belcher, Blandford, Clark, Davis, Gallagher, Garth, T. Johnson, Kujawa, Lively, Maskas, McClure, B. Tate, Warner and Wilson.

The starting lineup for William & Mary was: Al Vandeweghe (left end), Johnny Peterson (left tackle), Buster Ramsey (left guard), Bill Goodlow (center), Drewery Holloway (right guard), Harold Fields (right tackle), Knox (right end), Dave Bucher (quarterback), Jimmie Howard (left halfback), Hurlie Masters (right halfback), Harvey Johnson (fullback). The substitutes were: Marvin Bass, Jack Freeman, Johnny Grembowitz, Jim Hickey, Newell Irwin and Kindler.

=== Davidson ===
VPI at Davidson

Team	1	2	3	4	Total
• VPI	7	9	0	0	16
Davidson	0	0	0	0	0

- Date: October 18, 1941
- Location: Richardson Stadium
  Davidson, NC
- Game start: 2:30 p.m.
- Game attendance: 5,000

In October, VPI traveled to Davidson, North Carolina to play against Davidson. It was Davidson's homecoming game and Governor of North Carolina J. Melville Broughton was in attendance. The Gobblers' Billy James rushed for a three-yard touchdown in the first quarter with Roger McClure kicking the extra point. In the second quarter, VPI's Bobby Smith missed a 45-yard field goal, which set up Davidson near their own endzone. Wildcat Johnnie Miller then tried to punt on second down and VPI's Ben Tate blocked the punt for a safety. Earl Bethea then punted for Davidson after the safety, which Smith returned for a 65-yard touchdown with McClure kicking the extra point.

The starting lineup for VPI was: Clark (left end), Maskas (left tackle), Unterzuber (left guard), Davis (center), McClure (right guard), Judy (right tackle), Chasen (right end), Kern (quarterback), James (left halfback), Kujawa (right halfback), Smith (fullback). The substitutes were: B. Tate.

The starting lineup for Davidson was: Moorehead (left end), Donald Bell (left tackle), B. F. Moore (left guard), Frank Caldwell (center), William Shaw (right guard), Edward Hipp (right tackle), Robert Smith (right end), David Spencer (quarterback), John Miller (left halfback), Benjamin Shannon (right halfback), John Frederick (fullback). The substitutes were: Earl "Red" Bethea.

=== Washington and Lee ===
Washington and Lee vs VPI

Team	1	2	3	4	Total
W & L	3	0	0	0	3
• VPI	10	3	0	0	13

- Date: October 25, 1941
- Location: Lynchburg Municipal Stadium
  Lynchburg, VA
- Game start: 2:30 p.m.
- Game attendance: 6,000
- Game weather: "Clear, Crisp"

After their victory over Davidson, VPI won against Washington & Lee in Lynchburg, Virginia. Gobbler Roger McClure opened the scoring with a 41-yard field goal in the first quarter. W&L equaled the score when Frank Socha completed a 14-yard field goal after Joe Buagher rushed for 21 yards. Later in the first quarter, VPI's Billy James threw a 54-yard touchdown pass to Gerald Clark with McClure kicking the extra point. In the second quarter, VPI's John Maskas recovered a fumble by W&L's Teddy Ciesla and then McClure kicked his second field goal of the game, a 21-yarder. Both kickers attempted field goals in the fourth quarter, but were not successful. In the final two minutes of the game, the Generals' Harry Baugher completed a 57-yard pass to his brother Joe Baugher. But VPI's James intercepted the next pass, ending the game.

The starting lineup for VPI was: Clark (left end), Maskas (left tackle), McClure (left guard), Davis (center), Anderson (right guard), Judy (right tackle), Chasen (right end), Kern (quarterback), James (left halfback), Blandford (right halfback), Smith (fullback). The substitutes were: Brinkley, Fuller, Gallagher, Kujawa, Lawson, McClaugherty, B. Tate, W. Tate, Rucker, Sharpe, Wilson and Zydiak.

The starting lineup for Washington and Lee was: Thomas Nelson (left end), Lillard Ailor (left tackle), Roy Fabian Jr. (left guard), Joseph Littlepage (center), William Gray (right guard), William Furman (right tackle), Preston Brown (right end), Robert Pinck (quarterback), Harry Baugher (left halfback), Floyd McKenna (right halfback), Frank Frederick Socha (fullback). The substitutes were: Joe Baugher, Paul Cavaliere, Theodore Ciesla, James Daves, Frank DiLoreto, Bev Fitzpatrick, James Graff, Jack Roehl, John Rulevich, David Russell, Paul Skillman, Marshall "Tex" Steves and James Wheater.

=== Virginia ===
Virginia vs VPI

Team	1	2	3	4	Total
VPI	0	0	0	0	0
• Virginia	0	14	6	14	34

- Date: November 1, 1941
- Location: Foreman Field
  Norfolk, VA
- Game start: 2:30 p.m.
- Game attendance: 15,000
- Referee: Causey (South Carolina)

VPI's first game in November was a blowout loss against Virginia at Foreman Field in Norfolk, Virginia. Virginia captain Bill Dudley started the scoring in the second quarter when he threw a 19-yard touchdown to Billy Hill. Dudley then had an 8-yard touchdown pass to Eddie Bryant. Dudley also kicked the extra point for both touchdowns, and the Cavaliers led 14–0 at halftime. In the third quarter, Bryant had a 30-yard rush, followed by an 8-yard touchdown run by Dudley for his third touchdown. His extra point attempt was unsuccessful. Dudley then rushed four yards for his fourth touchdown in the fourth quarter. Virginia's final touchdown was a rush by fullback Don Niklason. Dudley kicked the final two extra points. VPI finished the game with 118 yards rushing and 13 yards passing, while Virginia finished with 245 yards rushing and 100 yards passing. Dudley finished the game with 132 rushing and 109 yards passing, accounting for 28 points.

The Matthew Fontaine Maury High School band performed at halftime. During the game, a VPI fan reportedly released a bulldog on the field.

The starting lineup for VPI was: Wilson (left end), Maskas (left tackle), Anderson (left guard), Zydiak (center), McClure (right guard), W. Tate (right tackle), Clark (right end), Kern (quarterback), James (left halfback), Gallagher (right halfback), Smith (fullback). The substitutes were: Belcher, Blandford, Chasen, Davis, Fuller, Henderson, Johnson, Judy, Kujawa, B. Tate and Wheeler.

The starting lineup for Virginia was: William Hill (left end), Edward Steckmesser (left tackle), James Bear (left guard), William Suhling III (center), John Sauerbeck (right guard), Nicholas Schlegel (right tackle), William Preston (right end), George West (quarterback), Bill Dudley (left halfback), C. Edgar Bryant (right halfback), Herbert Munhall Jr. (fullback). The substitutes were: Lawrence Abbott, Charles Cooper, Ross Craig, Francis Crenshaw, Robert Fuller, Turnbull Gillette, Edward Kreick, Irwin Lakin, J. Ashby Marshall, John Neff, Don Niklason, Daniel Oehmig, George Palmer, Milton Parlow, Eric Schlesinger, Robert Seiler and James White.

=== NC State ===
NC State vs VPI

Team	1	2	3	4	Total
• VPI	0	7	0	7	14
NC State	13	0	0	0	13

- Date: November 8, 1941
- Location: Winston-Salem, NC
- Game start: 2:30 p.m.
- Game attendance: 10,000

On November 8, VPI completed a comeback victory over NC State in Winston-Salem, North Carolina. NC State's tailback Dick Watts scored both of the Wolfpack touchdowns in the first quarter; the first was a 48-yard touchdown run on a fake reverse and the second was a two-yard rush. NC State's Art Faircloth missed the first extra point, which would be the difference in the final score. In the second quarter, VPI's Jack Gallagher threw a touchdown pass to Gerald Clark with Roger McClure kicking the extra point. After a scoreless third quarter, the Gobblers' Bobby Smith rushed for a touchdown in the fourth quarter to tie the game. McClure extra point attempt was successful, and VPI took the lead. The game ended after Smith intercepted pass during NC State's last drive.

The starting lineup for VPI was: Chasen (left end), Maskas (left tackle), W. Tate (left guard), Zydiak (center), Anderson (right guard), Lawson (right tackle), Clark (right end), Kern (quarterback), James (left halfback), Wheeler (right halfback), Blandford (fullback). The substitutes were: Davis, Fuller, Gallagher, Johnson, Judy, Lively, McClaugherty, McClure, Sharpe, Smith and Wilson.

The starting lineup for NC State was: Carl Fitchett (left end), George Jones (left tackle), John Barr (left guard), Wilton "Cutie" Carter (center), June "Dink" Caton (right guard), Tom Gould (right tackle), Jardine Gibson (right end), Robert Cathey (quarterback), Richard "Dick" Watts Jr. (left halfback), John "Jack" Huckabee (right halfback), Foy Clark (fullback). The substitutes were: Jimmy Allen, Mike Andrews, Phil Avery, Raymond Benbenek, Richard Callaway, Robert "Peanut" Doak, Art Faircloth, Cecil Fry, Ed Gibson, Gordon, Reuben Morgan, H. T. Moser, Nelson, Frank Owens, Charlie Riddle, William "Dud" Robbins, Russell Senter, J. L. Singer, Earl Stewart, T. M. Turner, Mac Williams and Barrett Wilson.

=== VMI ===
VMI vs VPI

Team	1	2	3	4	Total
VPI	0	10	0	0	10
• VMI	7	0	2	6	15

- Date: November 20, 1941
- Location: Lynchburg Municipal Stadium
  Lynchburg, VA
- Game attendance: 19,000-20,000

VPI lost to VMI on Thanksgiving at Lynchburg Municipal Stadium in Lynchburg, Virginia. VMI's Charlie Parkins rushed 11 yards for the game's first touchdown in the first quarter with Joe Muha kicking the extra point. in the second quarter, VPI's Billy James scored on an 11-yard touchdown run with Roger McClure kicking the extra point. Later in the quarter, McClure completed a 43-yard field goal to give VPI the lead at halftime. After halftime, VMI's Clyde Ellington blocked a punt by Bobby Smith, who fell on the loose ball in the Gobbler endzone for a safety. The final touchdown was a two-yard rush by VMI's Muha to take the lead. Muha's extra point attempt was blocked by VPI's Bill Zydiak. VPI finished the game with 171 yards rushing.

The starting lineup for VPI was: Chasen (left end), Maskas (left tackle), W. Tate (left guard), Zydiak (center), Anderson (right guard), Judy (right tackle), Clark (right end), Kern (quarterback), James (left halfback), Wheeler (right halfback), Smith (fullback). The substitutes were: Blandford, Gallagher, Johnson, Kujawa, Lawson, McClure, B. Tate, Unterzuber and Wilson.

The starting lineup for VMI was: Charlie Parkins (left end), Clyde Ellington (left tackle), W. Dow Markin (left guard), Barney Skladany (center), Julius Minton (right guard), Michael Ducko (right tackle), Billy Clark (right end), Bosh Pritchard (quarterback), Carter Catlett (left halfback), Joe Muha (right halfback), Johnny Stevens (fullback). The substitutes were: Robert Barton, King, Marks, William McIntyre, Bill Ward and Walter Wolfe.

=== Richmond ===
Richmond at VPI

Team	1	2	3	4	Total
Richmond	0	0	0	0	0
• VPI	0	7	6	0	13

- Date: November 29, 1941
- Location: Miles Stadium
  Blacksburg, VA
- Game start: 2:30 p.m.
- Game attendance: 4,000
- Game weather: "Pleasant"

VPI's final game of the season was a home victory against Richmond. In the first quarter, VPI drove to Richmond's 18-yard line and then again to their 29-yard line. However, both drives ended on missed field goals by Roger McClure. After stopping the Spiders at their 15-yard line in the second quarter, VPI's Bobby Smith had a 71-yard touchdown down the left sideline with McClure kicking the extra point. Later in the quarter, VPI's Ralph Unterzuber recovered a fumble by Richmond's Lem Fitzgerald and the Gobblers drove the Spiders' two-yard line. But then VPI's Jack Gallagher fumbled and Richmond recovered, ending the half. Smith scored another touchdown in the third quarter with a one-yard run on fourth down. McClure missed the extra point, his third missed kick of the game. VPI lost the ball again in the fourth quarter with a fumble by Tony Kujawa. VPI finished the game with 342 yards rushing and 56 yards passing, while Richmond finished with 73 yards rushing and 73 yards passing.

The starting lineup for VPI was: Clark (left end), Maskas (left tackle), W. Tate (left guard), Zydiak (center), Anderson (right guard), B. Tate (right tackle), Wilson (right end), Kern (quarterback), Blandford (left halfback), Wheeler (right halfback), Smith (fullback). The substitutes were: Belcher, Chasen, Davis, Gallagher, Garth, T. Johnson, W. Johnson, Kujawa, Lawson, McClaugherty, McClure, Rucker, Rupert, Sharpe and Unterzuber. Billy James was kept out of the game due to an injury sustained during the VMI game.

The starting lineup for Richmond was: Vincent Collins (left end), David Robertson (left tackle), Maxwell Katz (left guard), Bert Milling (center), Joseph Amrhein (right guard), Joseph Mack (right tackle), Houston Sizer (right end), Lemuel Fitzgerald (quarterback), Courtney Lawler (left halfback), Francis "Fitz" Laurinaitis (right halfback), Hall (fullback). The substitutes were: Courtney Bowen, Joseph Fortunato, Paul Graham, John Griffin, Alexander Jacobs, Warren Pace, P. Gordon Remine and Walter "Sonny" Wholey.

== After the season ==
After the 1941 season, players Jim Lively and Bobby Smith left VPI. In August 1942, Head Coach Kitts was commissioned as a lieutenant in the United States Navy Reserve to become a physical training instructor at a Navy Air Force preflight training school. Assistant Coach Jules Medwin also went into the service shortly after Kitts. The athletic council chose assistant coaches Herbert McEver and Sumner D. Tilson to be co-coaches until Kitts returned.

== Players ==
=== Roster ===
VPI 1941 roster
Van Anderson; Hudson Bailey; Alton Harwood Belcher; Henry Peter Bisschop; Mason Blandford; Bruce Brinkley; Irvin Chasen; Gerald Clark; William Davis; Diggs; Nelson Fuller; Jack Gallagher; William Anderson Garth	Willard Henderson; Bill James; Ted James Johnson; William "Stud" Johnson; Ben Judy; Dick Kern; Anthony Kujawa; Bob Lawson; Jim Lively; John Maskas; Allen McClaugherty; Roger McClure; John Rucker	Jay Simpson Rupert; Jim Sharpe; William Alexandra Shelton; Bobby Smith; Ben Tate; Bill Tate (Co-Capt.); Ralph Travis Unterzuber; William L. Varn; Paul Warner; Gene Wheeler; Elmer Wilson; Alfonso Wright, Jr.; Bill Zydiak (Co-Capt.)

=== Varsity letter winners ===
Twenty-six players received varsity letters for their participation on the 1941 VPI team.

Player	Hometown	Notes
Cecil Van Anderson	Andersonville, Virginia	World War II veteran (Major, Army Air Corps).
Mason Harper Blandford	Beaumont, Virginia	World War II veteran (Lt. (j.g.), Navy).
Irvin Jean Chasen	Richmond, Virginia	World War II veteran (1st Lieutenant, Army). Awarded four separate battlefield ribbons and the Combat Infantryman Badge.
Gerald Harley Clark	Bristol, Tennessee	
William Earnest Davis	Sutton, West Virginia	
Nelson Thomas Fuller	Phoebus, Virginia	World War II veteran (Major, Air Force).
John Edward "Jack" Gallagher	Roselle Park, New Jersey	World War II veteran (Sergeant, Army). Awarded Purple Heart.
Willard Joseph Henderson	Cumberland, Maryland	
William Wilson "Bill" James	Hampton, Virginia	World War II and Korean War veteran (1st Lieutenant, Army).
William B. Johnson	Hopewell, Virginia	
Samuel Benjamin Judy	Belleville, West Virginia	
Richard Davis Kern	Winchester, Virginia	World War II veteran (Major, Army). Awarded the Bronze Star Medal and Purple Heart.
Anthony Thomas Kujawa	Monessen, Pennsylvania	World War II veteran (Technical Sergeant, Army Air Forces). Held as a prisoner of war for two years. Awarded the Purple Heart, Distinguished Flying Cross and the Air Medal.
James Robert "Bob" Lawson	Cambria, Virginia	
Ioannis Demetrios “John James” Maskas	Monessen, Pennsylvania	World War II veteran (Marines). Emigrated with family from Kampos, Chios, Greece.
Charles Allen McClaugherty	Narrows, Virginia	World War II veteran (Marines).
Roger Nelson McClure	Glasgow, West Virginia	World War II veteran (Captain, Army).
John William Rucker	Delaplane, Virginia	
James Sharpe	Arlington, Virginia	
Robert "Bobby" Smith	Charlottesville, Virginia	
Benjamin Colonna Tate	Washington, D.C.	World War II, Korean War and Vietnam War veteran (Captain, Navy). Awarded the Navy Cross, Purple Heart, Distinguished Flying Cross and the Air Medal.
William Lee "Bill" Tate (Capt.)	Pulaski, Virginia	World War II veteran (Captain, Army).
Paul A. Warner, Jr.	Hamilton, Virginia	
Eugene Hagy Wheeler	Big Stone Gap, Virginia	World War II veteran (Army).
William Elmer Wilson	Hampton, Virginia	World War II veteran (Army).
William Daniel Zydiak (Capt.)	Manville, New Jersey	

== Coaching and training staff ==
- Head coach: Jimmy Kitts
- Assistant coaches:
  - Backfield coach: Herbert McEver
  - Linemen coach: Sumner D. Tilson
  - Trainer: Bill Altman
  - Assistant backfield coach: Charles "Jules" A. Medwin
  - Freshman coach: Red Laird
  - Bill Porterfield
- Manager: John Moore Albright
- Assistant managers:
  - Fishburn
  - Murphy
  - Stone

== Scoring Summary ==
Player	Passing Touchdowns	Receiving Touchdowns	Rushing Touchdowns	Return Touchdowns	Extra Points	Field goals	Safeties	Total Points
Roger McClure	0	0	0	0	12	4	0	24
Bobby Smith	0	0	3	1	0	0	0	24
Bill James	1	0	2	0	0	0	0	18
Jim Lively	0	2	1	0	0	0	0	18
Gerald Clark	0	2	0	0	0	0	0	12
Jack Gallagher	2	0	0	0	0	0	0	12
Mason Blandford	0	0	1	0	0	0	0	6
Bill Tate	0	0	1	0	0	0	0	6
Gene Wheeler	0	1	0	0	0	0	0	6
Ben Judy	0	0	0	0	0	0	1	2
Ben Tate	0	0	0	0	0	0	1	2
