= List of Wake Forest Demon Deacons in the NFL draft =

This is a list of Wake Forest Demon Deacons football players in the NFL draft.

== Key ==
B	Back	K	Kicker	NT	Nose tackle
C	Center	LB	Linebacker	FB	Fullback
DB	Defensive back	P	Punter	HB	Halfback
DE	Defensive end	QB	Quarterback	WR	Wide receiver
DT	Defensive tackle	RB	Running back	G	Guard
E	End	T	Offensive tackle	TE	Tight end

== Selections ==
Year	Round	Pick	Overall	Player	Team	Position
1939	15	5	135	Lou Trunzo	Brooklyn Dodgers	G
1940	20	1	181	Rupert Pate	Chicago Cardinals	T
1941	4	2	27	Jim Ringgold	Pittsburgh Steelers	B
1941	7	5	55	John Jett	Detroit Lions	E
1941	8	4	64	Tony Gallovich	Cleveland Rams	B
1941	10	4	84	John Pendergast	Cleveland Rams	C
1942	11	5	95	John Polansky	Detroit Lions	B
1942	13	4	114	Carl Givler	Chicago Cardinals	G
1942	20	1	181	Frank Kapriva	Pittsburgh Steelers	G
1943	17	9	159	Pat Preston	Chicago Bears	T
1944	5	9	41	George Owen	Pittsburgh Steelers	G
1944	8	1	66	Red Cochran	Chicago Cardinals	B
1944	10	8	95	Bill Stanford	Chicago Bears	C
1945	1	10	10	Elmer Barbour	New York Giants	B
1945	17	8	172	Nick Sacrinty	Chicago Bears	B
1945	22	1	220	Fred Grant	Chicago Cardinals	B
1945	27	5	279	Russ Perry	Cleveland Rams	B
1946	2	5	15	Elmer Jones	New York Giants	G
1946	5	8	38	Dave Harris	Detroit Lions	E
1946	18	3	163	Charles Garrison	Pittsburgh Steelers	G
1946	19	1	171	Pride Ratteree	Chicago Cardinals	G
1947	9	6	71	Bob Leonetti	Philadelphia Eagles	G
1947	10	5	80	Ulysses Cornogg	Philadelphia Eagles	T
1947	18	9	164	Dick Brnkley	New York Giants	B
1947	19	3	168	Harry Dowda	Washington Redskins	B
1947	27	3	248	Otis Sacrinty	Washington Redskins	B
1948	9	10	75	Ed Royston	New York Giants	G
1948	23	7	212	Jim Duncan	Chicago Bears	E
1948	24	10	225	Dick Wedel	Chicago Cardinals	G
1949	3	10	31	Red O'Quinn	Chicago Bears	E
1949	6	9	60	Bernie Hanula	Chicago Cardinals	T
1949	22	2	213	Jim Lail	Boston Yanks	B
1949	22	4	215	Tom Fetzer	New York Giants	B
1950	9	12	117	Jim Duncan	Cleveland Browns	E
1950	16	10	206	Ed Bradley	Chicago Bears	E
1950	17	8	217	Tom Palmer	Chicago Cardinals	T
1951	2	7	21	Jim Staton	Washington Redskins	T
1951	2	9	23	Bill George	Chicago Bears	T
1951	9	10	108	Bill Gregus	Chicago Bears	B
1952	11	7	128	Bill Miller	Chicago Bears	B
1952	19	2	219	Ed Listopad	Chicago Cardinals	T
1952	30	5	354	Ed Kissell	Pittsburgh Steelers	B
1953	4	4	41	Joe Koch	Chicago Bears	B
1953	5	4	53	Bob Gaona	Pittsburgh Steelers	T
1953	12	12	145	Larry Spencer	Detroit Lions	B
1953	19	3	220	Tom Donahue	Chicago Cardinals	C
1953	20	3	232	Bill Link	Washington Redskins	G
1953	25	5	294	Clyde Pickard	Chicago Bears	G
1953	29	5	342	Jack Lewis	Chicago Bears	E
1955	15	7	176	Ed Stowers	New York Giants	E
1955	17	8	201	Nick Maravic	Philadelphia Eagles	B
1955	26	6	307	Lou Hallow	Los Angeles Rams	C
1956	18	4	209	Nick Consoles	Philadelphia Eagles	DB
1956	24	4	281	John Parham	Philadelphia Eagles	B
1956	24	8	285	Gerry Huth	New York Giants	G
1956	30	11	360	Bob Bartholomew	Cleveland Browns	T
1957	2	6	19	Billy Ray Barnes	Philadelphia Eagles	B
1957	24	7	284	John Ladner	San Francisco 49ers	E
1957	29	1	338	John Niznik	Philadelphia Eagles	E
1958	20	7	236	George Johnson	Pittsburgh Steelers	T
1958	26	3	304	Neil MacLean	Philadelphia Eagles	B
1958	26	11	312	Frank Thompson	Cleveland Browns	T
1960	8	9	93	Pete Manning	Chicago Bears	E
1961	1	2	2	Norm Snead	Washington Redskins	QB
1961	5	9	65	Bob McCreary	San Francisco 49ers	T
1961	10	3	129	Wayne Wolff	Cleveland Browns	G
1962	3	7	35	Bill Hull	Chicago Bears	E
1962	15	7	203	Kent Martin	Chicago Bears	T
1965	18	11	249	Karl Sweetan	Detroit Lions	QB
1967	14	10	351	Lynn Nesbitt	Chicago Bears	G
1967	15	1	368	John Snow	New Orleans Saints	T
1968	2	23	50	Bob Grant	Baltimore Colts	LB
1968	7	12	177	Ken Henry	St. Louis Cardinals	WR
1969	4	20	98	Fred Summers	Cleveland Browns	DB
1970	4	2	80	Ed George	Pittsburgh Steelers	T
1971	8	11	193	Win Headley	Green Bay Packers	C
1972	4	10	88	Ed Bradley	Pittsburgh Steelers	LB
1973	8	6	188	Kenneth Garrett	St. Louis Cardinals	RB
1974	6	11	141	Chuck Ramsey	New England Patriots	K
1974	13	26	338	Clayton Heath	Miami Dolphins	RB
1977	8	18	213	Bill Armstrong	Cleveland Browns	DB
1977	10	20	271	Dave LaCrosse	Pittsburgh Steelers	LB
1978	4	25	109	Larry Tearry	Detroit Lions	C
1978	10	16	266	Steve Young	Houston Oilers	TE
1980	3	5	61	Syd Kitson	Green Bay Packers	G
1981	8	28	221	Billy Ard	New York Giants	G
1981	11	24	300	Carlos Bradley	San Diego Chargers	LB
1982	3	13	68	Kenny Duckett	New Orleans Saints	WR
1982	10	19	270	Rich Baldinger	New York Giants	T
1985	8	18	214	Harry Newsome	Pittsburgh Steelers	P
1985	10	14	266	Ronnie Burgess	Green Bay Packers	DB
1986	8	18	212	Topper Clemons	Dallas Cowboys	RB
1986	9	8	229	Gary Baldinger	Kansas City Chiefs	DE
1986	11	1	278	Tony Garbarczyk	Buffalo Bills	DT
1987	6	13	153	Paul Kiser	Atlanta Falcons	G
1987	9	5	228	Greg Harris	Green Bay Packers	G
1988	5	3	112	Greg Scales	New Orleans Saints	TE
1988	8	28	221	Darryl McGill	Washington Redskins	RB
1989	2	4	32	Mike Elkins	Kansas City Chiefs	QB
1989	2	24	52	David Braxton	Minnesota Vikings	LB
1989	9	22	245	A. J. Greene	New York Giants	DB
1990	3	5	58	Ricky Proehl	Phoenix Cardinals	WR
1990	4	27	108	Tony Mayberry	Tampa Bay Buccaneers	C
1993	2	3	32	Ben Coleman	Phoenix Cardinals	T
1993	5	19	131	John Henry Mills	Houston Oilers	TE
1993	7	2	170	Michael McCrary	Seattle Seahawks	DE
1999	6	10	179	Desmond Clark	Denver Broncos	TE
2000	2	24	55	Fred Robbins	Minnesota Vikings	DT
2000	3	25	87	Dustin Lyman	Chicago Bears	LB
2000	4	31	125	Reggie Austin	Chicago Bears	DB
2003	1	18	18	Calvin Pace	Arizona Cardinals	DE
2003	4	37	134	Ovie Mughelli	Baltimore Ravens	RB
2003	7	16	230	Montique Sharpe	Kansas City Chiefs	DT
2005	5	20	156	Eric King	Buffalo Bills	DB
2006	7	31	239	Ryan Plackemeier	Seattle Seahawks	P
2007	5	13	150	Josh Gattis	Jacksonville Jaguars	DB
2007	7	22	232	Steve Vallos	Seattle Seahawks	T
2008	4	3	102	Jeremy Thompson	Green Bay Packers	DE
2008	5	1	136	Kenneth Moore	Detroit Lions	WR
2008	6	35	201	Steve Justice	Indianapolis Colts	C
2009	1	4	4	Aaron Curry	Seattle Seahawks	LB
2009	2	5	37	Alphonso Smith	Denver Broncos	DB
2009	4	16	116	Chip Vaughn	New Orleans Saints	DB
2009	4	18	118	Stanley Arnoux	New Orleans Saints	LB
2010	3	32	96	Brandon Ghee	Cincinnati Bengals	DB
2010	5	30	161	Chris DeGeare	Minnesota Vikings	G
2012	4	1	96	Chris Givens	St. Louis Rams	WR
2012	4	18	113	Kyle Wilber	Dallas Cowboys	LB
2012	4	22	117	Joe Looney	San Francisco 49ers	G
2012	6	17	187	Josh Bush	New York Jets	DB
2013	7	9	215	Tommy Bohanon	New York Jets	RB
2014	7	3	218	Michael Campanaro	Baltimore Ravens	WR
2015	1	16	16	Kevin Johnson	Houston Texans	DB
2017	5	24	168	Marquel Lee	Oakland Raiders	LB
2018	2	22	54	Jessie Bates	Cincinnati Bengals	DB
2018	6	3	177	Duke Ejiofor	Houston Texans	DE
2019	4	22	124	Phil Haynes	Seattle Seahawks	G
2020	5	32	178	Justin Strnad	Denver Broncos	LB
2020	6	16	195	Justin Herron	New England Patriots	T
2021	2	29	61	Carlos Basham Jr.	Buffalo Bills	DE
2022	4	35	140	Zach Tom	Green Bay Packers	G
2022	6	35	214	Ja'Sir Taylor	Los Angeles Chargers	DB
2023	3	26	89	Kobie Turner	Los Angeles Rams	DE
2023	6	18	195	A. T. Perry	New Orleans Saints	WR
2024	4	24	124	Malik Mustapha	San Francisco 49ers	DB
2024	5	39	174	Caelen Carson	Dallas Cowboys	DB
2024	7	10	230	Michael Jurgens	Minnesota Vikings	C
2026	5	31	171	Karon Prunty	New England Patriots	CB
2026	6	17	198	Demond Claiborne	Minnesota Vikings	RB

== Notable undrafted players ==
Note: No drafts held before 1920

Debut year	Player name	Debut NFL/AFL team	Position	Notes
1965	Brian Piccolo	Chicago Bears	FB	—
1981	Jimmy Hargrove	Cincinnati Bengals	RB	—
1987	James Brim	St. Louis Cardinals	WR	—
1993	George Coghill	New Orleans Saints	DB	—
1998	Thabiti Davis	Carolina Panthers	WR	—
1999	Brian Kuklick	Dallas Cowboys	QB	—
2000	Jammie Deese	Washington Redskins	WR	—
2006	Chris Barclay	Cleveland Browns	RB	—
2009	Sam Swank	Philadelphia Eagles	K	—
2009	DJ Boldin	Detroit Lions	WR	—
2010	Riley Skinner	New York Giants	QB	—
2014	Josh Harris	Pittsburgh Steelers	RB	—
2014	Nikita Whitlock	Cincinnati Bengals	DT	—
2018	John Wolford	New York Jets	QB	—
2019	Greg Dortch	New York Jets	WR	—
2020	Kendall Hinton	Denver Broncos	WR	—
2021	Sage Surratt	Detroit Lions	TE	—
2022	Luke Masterson	Las Vegas Raiders	LB	—
2022	Jaquarii Roberson	Dallas Cowboys	WR	—
2022	Luiji Vilain	Minnesota Vikings	LB	—
2023	Blake Whiteheart	Cleveland Browns	TE	—
2026	Jayden Loving	Chicago Bears	DT	—
2026	Lardarius Webb Jr.	Baltimore Ravens	CB	—
