= 1941 Clemson Tigers football team =

American college football season

1941 Clemson Tigers football
- Conference: Southern Conference
- Record: 7–2 (5–1 SoCon)
- Head coach: Frank Howard (2nd season)
- Captain: Wade Padgett
- Home stadium: Riggs Field

1941 Southern Conference football standings
| | Conf. | | | | | Overall |
| Team | W | | L | | T | W | | L | | T |
|---|---|---|---|---|---|---|---|---|---|---|
| No. 2 Duke + | 5 | – | 0 | – | 0 | 9 | – | 1 | – | 0 |
| South Carolina + | 4 | – | 0 | – | 1 | 4 | – | 4 | – | 1 |
| Clemson | 5 | – | 1 | – | 0 | 7 | – | 2 | – | 0 |
| William & Mary | 4 | – | 1 | – | 0 | 8 | – | 2 | – | 0 |
| VMI | 4 | – | 2 | – | 0 | 4 | – | 6 | – | 0 |
| VPI | 4 | – | 2 | – | 0 | 6 | – | 4 | – | 0 |
| Wake Forest | 4 | – | 2 | – | 1 | 5 | – | 5 | – | 1 |
| NC State | 3 | – | 4 | – | 2 | 4 | – | 5 | – | 2 |
| Furman | 2 | – | 3 | – | 2 | 3 | – | 4 | – | 2 |
| Washington and Lee | 1 | – | 2 | – | 2 | 1 | – | 6 | – | 2 |
| North Carolina | 2 | – | 4 | – | 0 | 3 | – | 7 | – | 0 |
| Maryland | 1 | – | 2 | – | 0 | 3 | – | 5 | – | 1 |
| Davidson | 1 | – | 5 | – | 2 | 1 | – | 6 | – | 3 |
| The Citadel | 0 | – | 2 | – | 1 | 4 | – | 3 | – | 1 |
| George Washington | 0 | – | 4 | – | 1 | 1 | – | 7 | – | 1 |
| Richmond | 0 | – | 6 | – | 0 | 2 | – | 7 | – | 0 |
+ – Conference co-champions; Rankings from AP Poll

The 1941 Clemson Tigers football team was an American football that represented Clemson College as a member of the Southern Conference during the 1941 college football season. In their second season under head coach Frank Howard, the Tigers compiled a 7–2 record (5–1 against conference opponents), finished third in the conference, and outscored opponents by a total of 233 to 90.

Guard Wade Padgett was the team captain. The team's statistical leaders included tailback "Booty" Payne with 582 passing yards and fullback Charlie Timmons with 635 rushing yards and 77 points scored (9 touchdowns and 23 extra points).

Three Clemson players were selected by the Associated Press (AP) or United Press (UP) as first-team players on the 1941 All-Southern Conference football team: Charlie Timmons (AP-1, UP-1); end Joe Blalock (AP-1, UP-1); and tackle George Fritts (AP-1, UP-1).

Clemson was ranked at No. 39 (out of 681 teams) in the final rankings under the Litkenhous Difference by Score System for 1941.

The team played its home games at Riggs Field in Clemson, South Carolina.

== Schedule ==
| Date | Opponent | Rank | Site | Result | Attendance | Source |
|---|---|---|---|---|---|---|
| September 20 | Presbyterian* | | Riggs Field; Clemson, SC | W 41–12 | 6,000 | |
| September 27 | vs. VMI | | Municipal Stadium; Lynchburg, VA | W 36–7 | 6,000 | |
| October 4 | vs. NC State | | Municipal Stadium; Charlotte, NC (rivalry) | W 27–6 | 15,000 | |
| October 11 | at Boston College* | | Fenway Park; Boston, MA (rivalry) | W 26–13 | 23,000 | |
| October 23 | at South Carolina | No. 14 | Municipal Stadium; Columbia, SC (rivalry) | L 14–18 | 22,000 | |
| October 31 | at George Washington | | Griffith Stadium; Washington, D. C. | W 19–0 | 6,000 | |
| November 15 | Wake Forest^{†} | | Riggs Field; Clemson, SC | W 29–0 | 11,000 | |
| November 22 | at Furman | No. 18 | Sirrine Stadium; Greenville, SC | W 34–6 | 18,000 | |
| November 29 | at Auburn* | No. 16 | Auburn Stadium; Auburn, AL (rivalry) | L 7–28 | 12,000 | |
*Non-conference game; ^{†}Homecoming; Rankings from AP Poll released prior to the game

== Rankings ==
Ranking movements Legend: ██ Increase in ranking ██ Decrease in ranking — = Not ranked ( ) = First-place votes
| | Week | | | | | | | |
| Poll | 1 | 2 | 3 | 4 | 5 | 6 | 7 | Final |
|---|---|---|---|---|---|---|---|---|
| AP | 13 (1) | 14 (3) | — | — | — | 18 | 16 | — |
