= 1941 VMI Keydets football team =

American college football season

1941 VMI Keydets football
- Conference: Southern Conference
- Record: 4–6 (4–2 SoCon)
- Head coach: Pooley Hubert (5th season)
- Home stadium: Alumni Field

1941 Southern Conference football standings
	Conf.					Overall
Team	W		L		T	W		L		T
No. 2 Duke +	5	–	0	–	0	9	–	1	–	0
South Carolina +	4	–	0	–	1	4	–	4	–	1
Clemson	5	–	1	–	0	7	–	2	–	0
William & Mary	4	–	1	–	0	8	–	2	–	0
VMI	4	–	2	–	0	4	–	6	–	0
VPI	4	–	2	–	0	6	–	4	–	0
Wake Forest	4	–	2	–	1	5	–	5	–	1
NC State	3	–	4	–	2	4	–	5	–	2
Furman	2	–	3	–	2	3	–	4	–	2
Washington and Lee	1	–	2	–	2	1	–	6	–	2
North Carolina	2	–	4	–	0	3	–	7	–	0
Maryland	1	–	2	–	0	3	–	5	–	1
Davidson	1	–	5	–	2	1	–	6	–	3
The Citadel	0	–	2	–	1	4	–	3	–	1
George Washington	0	–	4	–	1	1	–	7	–	1
Richmond	0	–	6	–	0	2	–	7	–	0
+ – Conference co-champions; Rankings from AP Poll

The 1941 VMI Keydets football team was an American football team that represented the Virginia Military Institute (VMI) as a member of the Southern Conference during the 1941 college football season. In its fifth season under head coach Pooley Hubert, the team compiled a 4–6 record (4–2 against conference opponents), tied for fifth place in the conference, and was outscored by a total of 173 to 134.

VMI was ranked at No. 101 (out of 681 teams) in the final rankings under the Litkenhous Difference by Score System for 1941.

Backs Bosh Pritchard and Joe Muha were selected by both the Associated Press and United Press as second-team players on the 1941 All-Southern Conference football team.

The team played its home games at Alumni Field in Lexington, Virginia, and Municipal Stadium in Lynchburg, Virginia.

== Schedule ==
Date	Opponent	Site	Result	Attendance	Source
September 27	Clemson	Municipal Stadium; Lynchburg, VA	L 7–36	6,000	
October 4	at Temple*	Temple Stadium; Philadelphia, PA	L 13–28	15,000	
October 11	at Army*	Michie Stadium; West Point, NY	L 20–27	7,000	
October 18	Virginia*	Wilson Field; Lexington, VA	L 7–27	14,000	
October 25	at Richmond	City Stadium; Richmond, VA (rivalry)	W 25–7		
November 1	Davidson	Municipal Stadium; Lynchburg, VA	W 13–7	1,000	
November 8	at William & Mary	Cary Field; Williamsburg, VA (rivalry)	L 0–21	13,000	
November 15	at Maryland	Old Byrd Stadium; College Park, MD	W 27–0		
November 20	vs. VPI	Municipal Stadium; Lynchburg, VA (rivalry)	W 15–10	19,000	
December 5	at Miami (FL)*	Burdine Stadium; Miami, FL	L 7–10	19,544	
*Non-conference game
