= 1941 William & Mary Indians football team =

American college football season

1941 William & Mary Indians football
- Conference: Southern Conference
- Record: 8–2 (4–1 SoCon)
- Head coach: Carl M. Voyles (3rd season)
- Captain: Bill Goodlow
- Home stadium: Cary Field

1941 Southern Conference football standings
	Conf.					Overall
Team	W		L		T	W		L		T
No. 2 Duke +	5	–	0	–	0	9	–	1	–	0
South Carolina +	4	–	0	–	1	4	–	4	–	1
Clemson	5	–	1	–	0	7	–	2	–	0
William & Mary	4	–	1	–	0	8	–	2	–	0
VMI	4	–	2	–	0	4	–	6	–	0
VPI	4	–	2	–	0	6	–	4	–	0
Wake Forest	4	–	2	–	1	5	–	5	–	1
NC State	3	–	4	–	2	4	–	5	–	2
Furman	2	–	3	–	2	3	–	4	–	2
Washington and Lee	1	–	2	–	2	1	–	6	–	2
North Carolina	2	–	4	–	0	3	–	7	–	0
Maryland	1	–	2	–	0	3	–	5	–	1
Davidson	1	–	5	–	2	1	–	6	–	3
The Citadel	0	–	2	–	1	4	–	3	–	1
George Washington	0	–	4	–	1	1	–	7	–	1
Richmond	0	–	6	–	0	2	–	7	–	0
+ – Conference co-champions; Rankings from AP Poll

The 1941 William & Mary Indians football team was an American football team that represented the College of William & Mary in the Southern Conference during the 1941 college football season. In their third season under head coach Carl M. Voyles, the Indians compiled an 8–2 record (4–1 against conference opponents), finished fourth in the conference, and outscored opponents by a total of 253 to 64.

Three William & Mary players were selected by the Associated Press (AP) or United Press (UP) as first-team players on the 1941 All-Southern Conference football team: back Harvey Johnson (AP-1, UP-1); guard Garrard Ramesey (AP-1, UP-1); and end Glen Knox (UP-1).

William & Mary was ranked at No. 65 (out of 681 teams) in the final rankings under the Litkenhous Difference by Score System for 1941.

The team played its home games at Cary Field in Williamsburg, Virginia.

== Schedule ==
Date	Opponent	Site	Result	Attendance	Source
September 20	Apprentice*	Cary Field; Williamsburg, VA	W 53–0		
September 27	at Navy*	Thompson Stadium; Annapolis, MD	L 0–34	18,121	
October 4	Randolph–Macon*	Williamsburg, VA	W 57–7	2,000	
October 11	vs. VPI	City Stadium; Richmond, VA	W 16–7	12,000	
October 18	at Hampden–Sydney*	Hampden Sydney, VA	W 28–0	2,500	
October 25	vs. George Washington	Foreman Field; Norfolk, VA	W 48–0	8,000	
November 1	at Dartmouth*	Memorial Field; Hanover, NH	W 3–0	8,000	
November 8	VMI^{†}	Cary Field; Williamsburg, VA (rivalry)	W 21–0	13,000	
November 20	at Richmond	City Stadium; Richmond, VA (rivalry)	W 33–13	12,000	
November 29	NC State	Cary Field; Williamsburg, VA	L 0–13	6,000	
*Non-conference game; ^{†}Homecoming

== Season summary ==
=== VPI ===
William & Mary vs VPI

Team	1	2	3	4	Total
VPI	0	0	7	0	7
• W & M	0	10	6	0	16

- Date: October 11, 1941
- Location: City Stadium
  Richmond, VA
- Game attendance: 12,000

William & Mary's game with VPI was played at City Stadium in Richmond, Virginia in front of approximately 12,000 fans. W&M's Jack Freeman had two interceptions in the first half, both of which led to scoring drives. W&M's first touchdown was a four-yard run by Jimmy Howard with Harvey Johnson kicking the extra point. The Indians scored again when Johnson kicked a 16-yard field goal at the end of the first half, after missing a field goal wide-right in the first quarter. In the third quarter, VPI had a 63-yard drive that ended with their only points of the game, a one-yard run by Mason Blandford with Roger McClure kicking the extra point. Later in the third quarter, VPI's Jim Lively returned a punt, but was pushed back to VPI's one-yard line. VPI eventually punted and the Indians took over at the Gobblers' 34-yard line. Johnny Korczowski then completed a 30-yard pass to Johnson, and on the next play Korczowski rushed four yards for a touchdown. In the fourth quarter, Freeman fumbled a punt on W&M's 16-yard line. However, the Gobblers were only able to advance to the nine-yard line and did not score. Later in the fourth quarter, the Indians were penalized for clipping and turned the ball over to VPI on W&M's 21-yard line. But again the Gobblers could not score after getting to the 2-yard line.
