= Edward Bradley =

Edward Bradley may refer to:

- Edward Bradley (politician) (1808–1847), U.S. Representative from Michigan
- Edward Bradley (writer) (1827–1889), English novelist and clergyman
- Edward Bradley (colonel) (died 1829), colonel in the American Revolution and the War of 1812
- Edward R. Bradley (1859–1946), American businessman, thoroughbred racehorse owner/breeder
- Ed Bradley (1941–2006), CBS news correspondent
- Ed Bradley (linebacker) (born 1950), American football player
- Ed Bradley (guard) (1927–2009), American football guard
- Ed Bradley (politician), member of the Oklahoma Senate (1959–1961, 1965–1973)
- Edward E. Bradley (1845–1917), American military general
- G. Edward Bradley (1906–1993), American optometrist and politician in Massachusetts
