= 1941 South Carolina Gamecocks football team =

American college football season

1941 South Carolina Gamecocks football
- Conference: Southern Conference
- Record: 4–4–1 (4–0–1 SoCon)
- Head coach: Rex Enright (4th season)
- Captains: Harvey Blouin; Dutch Elston
- Home stadium: Carolina Municipal Stadium

1941 Southern Conference football standings
	Conf.					Overall
Team	W		L		T	W		L		T
No. 2 Duke +	5	–	0	–	0	9	–	1	–	0
South Carolina +	4	–	0	–	1	4	–	4	–	1
Clemson	5	–	1	–	0	7	–	2	–	0
William & Mary	4	–	1	–	0	8	–	2	–	0
VMI	4	–	2	–	0	4	–	6	–	0
VPI	4	–	2	–	0	6	–	4	–	0
Wake Forest	4	–	2	–	1	5	–	5	–	1
NC State	3	–	4	–	2	4	–	5	–	2
Furman	2	–	3	–	2	3	–	4	–	2
Washington and Lee	1	–	2	–	2	1	–	6	–	2
North Carolina	2	–	4	–	0	3	–	7	–	0
Maryland	1	–	2	–	0	3	–	5	–	1
Davidson	1	–	5	–	2	1	–	6	–	3
The Citadel	0	–	2	–	1	4	–	3	–	1
George Washington	0	–	4	–	1	1	–	7	–	1
Richmond	0	–	6	–	0	2	–	7	–	0
+ – Conference co-champions; Rankings from AP Poll

The 1941 South Carolina Gamecocks football team was an American football team that represented the University of South Carolina in the Southern Conference (SEC) during the 1941 college football season. In their fourth season under head coach Rex Enright, the Gamecocks compiled a 4–4–1 record (4–0–1 against conference opponents) and finished co-champions in the SoCon, despite being outscored by a total of 103 to 100.

Back Stan Stasica was selected by both the Associated Press (AP) and United Press (UP) as a first-team player on the 1941 All-Southern Conference football team.

South Carolina was ranked at No. 75 (out of 681 teams) in the final rankings under the Litkenhous Difference by Score System for 1941.

The team played its home games at Carolina Stadium in Columbia, South Carolina.

== Schedule ==
Date	Opponent	Site	Result	Attendance	Source
September 27	at North Carolina	Kenan Memorial Stadium; Chapel Hill, NC (rivalry)	W 13–7	11,000	
October 4	at Georgia*	Sanford Stadium; Athens, GA (rivalry)	L 6–34	17,000	
October 11	Wake Forest	Carolina Stadium; Columbia, SC	T 6–6	10,000	
October 23	No. 14 Clemson	Carolina Stadium; Columbia, SC (rivalry)	W 18–14	22,000	
October 31	vs. The Citadel	County Fairgrounds; Orangeburg, SC	W 13–6	10,000	
November 8	at Kansas State*	Memorial Stadium; Manhattan, KS	L 0–3	8,000	
November 15	Furman^{†}	Carolina Stadium; Columbia, SC	W 26–7	12,000	
November 21	at Miami (FL)*	Burdine Stadium; Miami, FL	L 6–7	17,210	
November 29	Penn State*	Carolina Stadium; Columbia, SC	L 12–19	12,000	
*Non-conference game; ^{†}Homecoming; Rankings from AP Poll released prior to the game
