= 1941 Duke Blue Devils football team =

American college football season

1941 Duke Blue Devils football
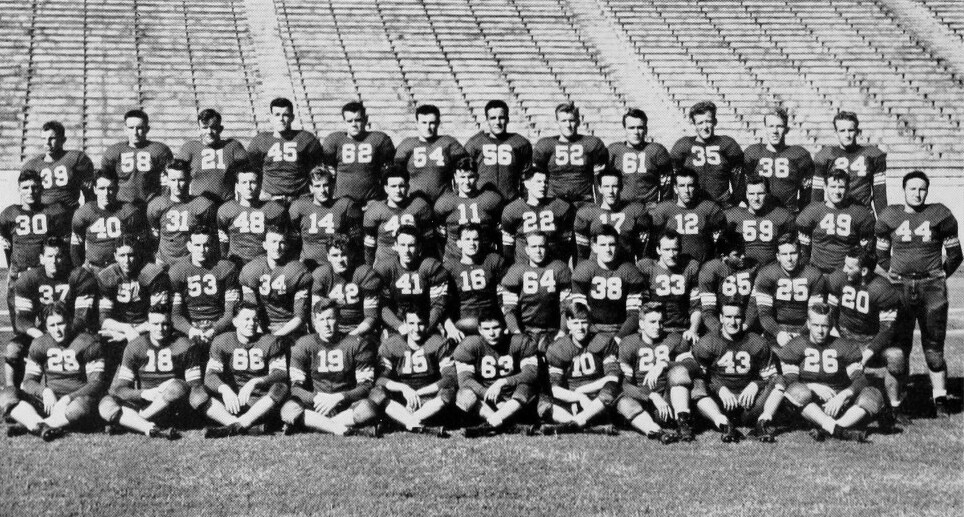

National champion (Ray Bryne) SoCon champion

Rose Bowl, L 16–20 vs. Oregon State
- Conference: Southern Conference

Ranking
- AP: No. 2
- Record: 9–1 (5–0 SoCon)
- Head coach: Wallace Wade (11th season)
- Offensive scheme: Single-wing
- MVP: Pete Goddard
- Captain: Bob Barnett
- Home stadium: Duke Stadium

1941 Southern Conference football standings
	Conf.					Overall
Team	W		L		T	W		L		T
No. 2 Duke +	5	–	0	–	0	9	–	1	–	0
South Carolina +	4	–	0	–	1	4	–	4	–	1
Clemson	5	–	1	–	0	7	–	2	–	0
William & Mary	4	–	1	–	0	8	–	2	–	0
VMI	4	–	2	–	0	4	–	6	–	0
VPI	4	–	2	–	0	6	–	4	–	0
Wake Forest	4	–	2	–	1	5	–	5	–	1
NC State	3	–	4	–	2	4	–	5	–	2
Furman	2	–	3	–	2	3	–	4	–	2
Washington and Lee	1	–	2	–	2	1	–	6	–	2
North Carolina	2	–	4	–	0	3	–	7	–	0
Maryland	1	–	2	–	0	3	–	5	–	1
Davidson	1	–	5	–	2	1	–	6	–	3
The Citadel	0	–	2	–	1	4	–	3	–	1
George Washington	0	–	4	–	1	1	–	7	–	1
Richmond	0	–	6	–	0	2	–	7	–	0
+ – Conference co-champions; Rankings from AP Poll

The 1941 Duke Blue Devils football team was an American football team that represented Duke University as a member of the Southern Conference during the 1941 college football season. In their 11th season under head coach Wallace Wade, the Blue Devils compiled a 9–0 record during the regular season, won the Southern Conference championship, and outscored opponents by a total of 311 to 41. Ranked No. 2 in the final AP poll, the Blue Devils were invited to play in the 1942 Rose Bowl (played at Duke Stadium), losing to Oregon State by a 20–16 score.

Four Duke players were selected as first-team players on the 1941 All-Southern Conference football team: halfback Steve Lach, left tackle Mike Karmazin, right end Bob Gantt, and center Bob Barnett. Lach was also selected by the International News Service, Liberty magazine, and the Newspaper Enterprise Association as a first-team player on the 1941 All-America team. Lach was also later inducted into the College Football Hall of Fame.

One minor selector, Ray Bryne, selected Duke as national champion.

== Schedule ==
Date	Opponent	Rank	Site	Result	Attendance	Source
September 27	Wake Forest		Duke Stadium; Durham NC (rivalry)	W 43–14	13,500	
October 4	Tennessee*^{†}		Duke Stadium; Durham, NC	W 19–0	45,000	
October 11	at Maryland*		Byrd Stadium; Baltimore, MD	W 50–0	12,000	
October 18	Colgate*	No. 3	Duke Stadium; Durham, NC	W 27–14	25,000	
October 25	at Pittsburgh*	No. 4	Pitt Stadium; Pittsburgh, PA	W 27–7	28,000	
November 1	at Georgia Tech*	No. 4	Grant Field; Atlanta, GA	W 14–0	28,000	
November 8	at Davidson	No. 4	Davidson, NC	W 56–0	10,000	
November 15	North Carolina	No. 3	Duke Stadium; Durham, NC (rivalry)	W 20–0	45,000	
November 22	at NC State	No. 3	Riddick Stadium; Raleigh, NC (rivalry)	W 55–6	15,000	
January 1, 1942	vs. No. 12 Oregon State*	No. 2	Duke Stadium; Durham, NC (Rose Bowl)	L 16–20	56,000	
*Non-conference game; ^{†}Homecoming; Rankings from AP Poll released prior to the game

== Rankings ==
Ranking movements Legend: ██ Increase in ranking ██ Decrease in ranking ( ) = First-place votes
	Week							
Poll	1	2	3	4	5	6	7	Final
AP	3 (14)	4 (7)	4 (5)	4 (7)	3 (11)	3 (12)	3 (15)	2 (9.5)
