= 1941 North Carolina Tar Heels football team =

American college football season

1941 North Carolina Tar Heels football
- Conference: Southern Conference
- Record: 3–7 (2–4 SoCon)
- Head coach: Raymond Wolf (6th season)
- Captains: Harry Dunkle; Carl Suntheimer
- Home stadium: Kenan Memorial Stadium

1941 Southern Conference football standings
	Conf.					Overall
Team	W		L		T	W		L		T
No. 2 Duke +	5	–	0	–	0	9	–	1	–	0
South Carolina +	4	–	0	–	1	4	–	4	–	1
Clemson	5	–	1	–	0	7	–	2	–	0
William & Mary	4	–	1	–	0	8	–	2	–	0
VMI	4	–	2	–	0	4	–	6	–	0
VPI	4	–	2	–	0	6	–	4	–	0
Wake Forest	4	–	2	–	1	5	–	5	–	1
NC State	3	–	4	–	2	4	–	5	–	2
Furman	2	–	3	–	2	3	–	4	–	2
Washington and Lee	1	–	2	–	2	1	–	6	–	2
North Carolina	2	–	4	–	0	3	–	7	–	0
Maryland	1	–	2	–	0	3	–	5	–	1
Davidson	1	–	5	–	2	1	–	6	–	3
The Citadel	0	–	2	–	1	4	–	3	–	1
George Washington	0	–	4	–	1	1	–	7	–	1
Richmond	0	–	6	–	0	2	–	7	–	0
+ – Conference co-champions; Rankings from AP Poll

The 1941 North Carolina Tar Heels football team was an American football team that represented the University of North Carolina as a member of the Southern Conference during the 1941 college football season. In their sixth year under head coach Raymond Wolf, the Tar Heels compiled a 3–7 record (2–4 against conference opponents), finished 11th in the Southern Conference, and were outscored by a total of 172 to 130.

Three North Carolina players were selected by the United Press (UP) or the Associated Press (AP) for the 1941 All-Southern Conference football team: tackle Dick Steck (AP-2, UP-2); center Carl Suntheimer (AP-3); and back Harry Dunkle (AP-3).

North Carolina was ranked at No. 100 (out of 681 teams) in the final rankings under the Litkenhous Difference by Score System for 1941.

The team played its home games at Kenan Memorial Stadium in Chapel Hill, North Carolina.

Coach Wolf left the school in March 1942 to join the United States Navy.

== Schedule ==
Date	Time	Opponent	Site	Result	Attendance	Source
September 20	3:30 p.m.	Lenoir–Rhyne*	Kenan Memorial Stadium; Chapel Hill, NC	W 42–6	25,000	
September 27	3:30 p.m.	South Carolina	Kenan Memorial Stadium; Chapel Hill, NC (rivalry)	L 7–13	11,000	
October 4	8:30 p.m.	at Davidson	Richardson Stadium; Davidson, NC	W 20–0		
October 11	2:30 p.m.	Fordham*	Kenan Memorial Stadium; Chapel Hill, NC	L 14–27	27,000	
October 18	3:00 p.m.	at No. 17 Tulane*	Tulane Stadium; New Orleans, LA	L 6–52	33,000	
October 25	2:00 p.m.	at Wake Forest	Groves Stadium; Wake Forest, NC (rivalry)	L 0–13	14,000	
November 1	2:00 p.m.	NC State	Kenan Memorial Stadium; Chapel Hill, NC (rivalry)	L 7–13	17,000	
November 8	8:00 p.m.	at Richmond	City Stadium; Richmond, VA	W 27–0	2,500	
November 15	2:00 p.m.	at No. 3 Duke	Duke Stadium; Durham, NC (rivalry)	L 0–20	45,000	
November 20	2:00 p.m.	Virginia*	Kenan Memorial Stadium; Chapel Hill, NC (rivalry)	L 7–28	22,000	
*Non-conference game; Rankings from AP Poll released prior to the game; All times are in Eastern time
