= Art Jones (American football) =

American football player (1919–1995)

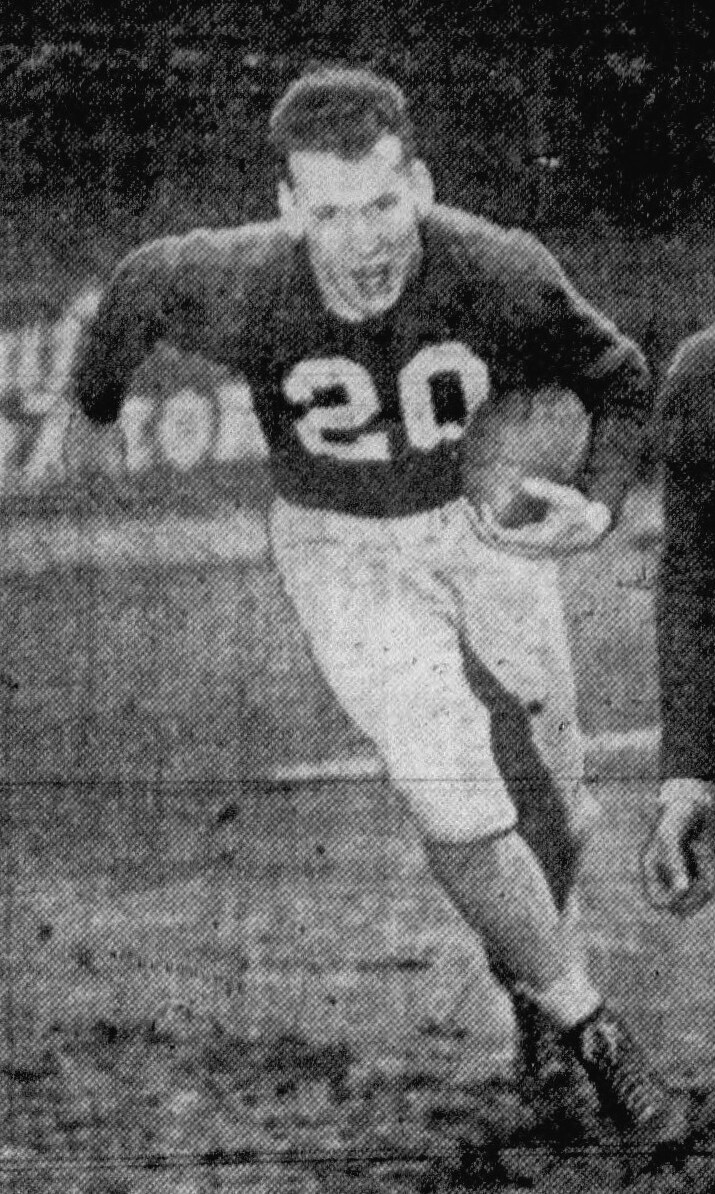
- Jones, circa 1941

No. 12, 44
- Positions: Halfback, defensive back

Personal information
- Born: June 13, 1919; Farmville, Virginia, U.S.
- Died: August 29, 1995 (aged 76); Suffolk, Virginia, U.S.
- Listed height: 6 ft 2 in (1.88 m)
- Listed weight: 192 lb (87 kg)

Career information
- High school: Suffolk
- College: Richmond (1937-1940)
- NFL draft: 1941: 2nd round, 11th overall pick

Career history
- Pittsburgh Steelers (1941, 1945); Richmond Rebels (1946)

Awards and highlights
- Pro Bowl (1941); NFL interceptions co-leader (1941); Second-team All-SoCon (1940)

Career NFL statistics
- Rushing yards: 303
- Rushing average: 3.9
- Receptions: 9
- Receiving yards: 129
- Total touchdowns: 5
- Stats at Pro Football Reference

Arthur Edward Jones Jr. (June 13, 1919 — August 29, 1995) was an American professional football player who was a defensive back for two seasons (1941, 1945) with the Pittsburgh Steelers of National Football League (NFL). After playing college football for the Richmond Spiders, he was selected by the Philadelphia Eagles in the second round (11th overall) of the 1941 NFL draft. His rights were transferred to the Steelers due to the events later referred to as the Pennsylvania Polka. He served in World War II for the United States Navy before rejoining the Steelers in 1945. He played for the Richmond Rebels of the Dixie League in 1946.

In 1975, Jones was inducted into the Virginia Sports Hall of Fame.
