= 1941 Wake Forest Demon Deacons football team =

American college football season

1941 Wake Forest Demon Deacons football
- Conference: Southern Conference
- Record: 5–5–1 (4–2–1 SoCon)
- Head coach: Peahead Walker (5th season)
- Captains: Cal Givler; John Polanski
- Home stadium: Groves Stadium

1941 Southern Conference football standings
	Conf.					Overall
Team	W		L		T	W		L		T
No. 2 Duke +	5	–	0	–	0	9	–	1	–	0
South Carolina +	4	–	0	–	1	4	–	4	–	1
Clemson	5	–	1	–	0	7	–	2	–	0
William & Mary	4	–	1	–	0	8	–	2	–	0
VMI	4	–	2	–	0	4	–	6	–	0
VPI	4	–	2	–	0	6	–	4	–	0
Wake Forest	4	–	2	–	1	5	–	5	–	1
NC State	3	–	4	–	2	4	–	5	–	2
Furman	2	–	3	–	2	3	–	4	–	2
Washington and Lee	1	–	2	–	2	1	–	6	–	2
North Carolina	2	–	4	–	0	3	–	7	–	0
Maryland	1	–	2	–	0	3	–	5	–	1
Davidson	1	–	5	–	2	1	–	6	–	3
The Citadel	0	–	2	–	1	4	–	3	–	1
George Washington	0	–	4	–	1	1	–	7	–	1
Richmond	0	–	6	–	0	2	–	7	–	0
+ – Conference co-champions; Rankings from AP Poll

The 1941 Wake Forest Demon Deacons football team was an American football team that represented Wake Forest University during the 1941 college football season. In its fifth season under head coach Peahead Walker, the team compiled a 5–5–1 record (4–2–1 against conference opponents), finished seventh in the Southern Conference, and outscored opponents by a total of 218 to 168.

Guard Carl Givler was selected by both the Associated Press and United Press as a first-team player on the 1941 All-Southern Conference football team.

Wake Forest was ranked at No. 72 (out of 681 teams) in the final rankings under the Litkenhous Difference by Score System for 1941.

== Schedule ==
Date	Opponent	Site	Result	Attendance	Source
September 20	at Camp Davis*	Wilmington, NC	W 65–0	10,000	
September 27	at Duke	Duke Stadium; Durham NC (rivalry)	L 14–43	13,500	
October 4	at Furman	Sirrine Stadium; Greenville, SC	W 52–13	8,000	
October 11	at South Carolina	Carolina Stadium; Columbia, SC	T 6–6	10,000	
October 18	at NC State	Riddick Stadium; Raleigh, NC (rivalry)	W 7–0	15,000	
October 25	North Carolina	Groves Stadium; Wake Forest, NC (rivalry)	W 13–0	14,000	
November 1	at Marshall*	Huntington, WV	L 6–16	10,000	
November 8	at Boston College*	Alumni Field; Chestnut Hill, MA	L 6–26	13,446	
November 15	at Clemson	Riggs Field; Clemson, SC	L 0–29	11,000	
November 20	at George Washington	Griffith Stadium; Washington, DC	W 42–0	5,000	
November 29	Texas Tech*	American Legion Memorial Stadium; Charlotte, NC	L 6–25	7,000	
*Non-conference game
