= Lou Sossamon =

American football player (1921–2019)

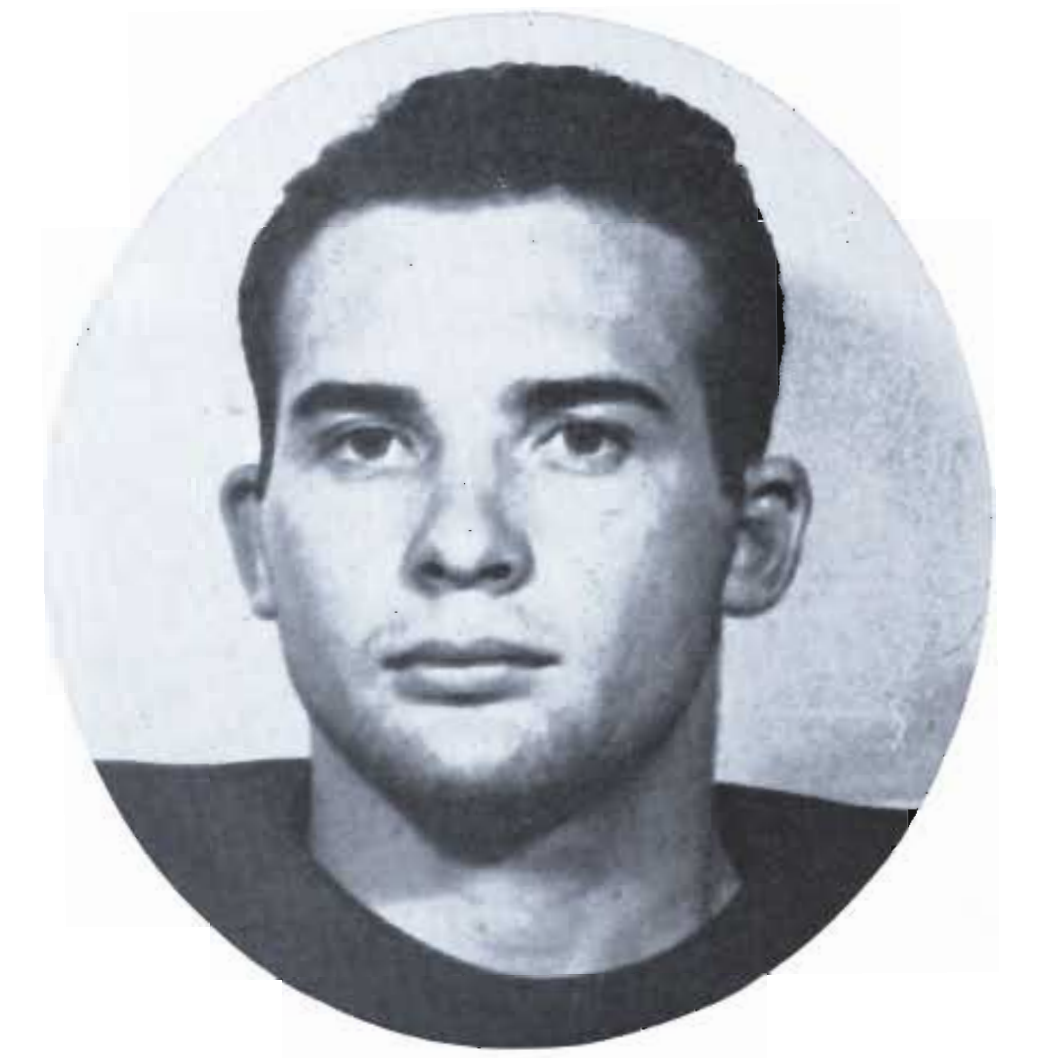
- Sossamon pictured c. 1943 at the University of South Carolina

No. 25
- Positions: Center, linebacker

Personal information
- Born: June 2, 1921; Gaffney, South Carolina, U.S.
- Died: February 11, 2019 (aged 97); West Columbia, South Carolina, U.S.
- Listed height: 6 ft 1 in (1.85 m)
- Listed weight: 207 lb (94 kg)

Career information
- High school: Gaffney
- College: South Carolina (1939–1942)
- NFL draft: 1943: 6th round, 47th overall pick

Career history
- New York Yankees (1946–1948)

Awards and highlights
- Second-team All-American (1942); First-team All-SoCon (1942); Second-team All-SoCon (1941)

Career AAFC statistics
- Games played: 42
- Starts: 26
- Touchdowns: 1
- Stats at Pro Football Reference

Louis Cody Sossamon (June 2, 1921 – February 11, 2019) was an American professional football center and linebacker who played three seasons with the New York Yankees of the All-America Football Conference (AAFC). He played college football at the University of South Carolina, having previously attended high school in his hometown of Gaffney, South Carolina.

He is a member of the University of South Carolina and South Carolina State Athletic Halls of Fame.

== Early life ==
Lou Sossamon was born June 2, 1921 in Gaffney, South Carolina. He attended Gaffney High School, where he demonstrated prowess on the football field.

== College career ==
Sossamon caught the attention of head coach Rex Enright of the University of South Carolina (USC), who offered him an athletic scholarship to play football at the school. Sossamon attended USC from 1939 to 1943, distinguishing himself as a center on the offensive side of the ball and linebacker on defense.

As a senior in 1942, Sossamon was selected to the Associated Press All-America team, becoming the first South Carolina Gamecocks player so honored.

Sossamon graduated in January 1943, becoming part of USC's first mid-year commencement — an expedited schedule brought on by the exigencies of World War II.

== Wartime and professional football ==
Sossamon was selected in the sixth round of the 1943 NFL draft by the Pittsburgh Steelers of the National Football League (NFL), who made him the 47th overall selection. However, owing to World War II, Sossamon enlisted in the United States Navy, in which he served through the end of the war.

During the war he played service football, first for Bainbridge Naval Training Center in Maryland, where he was teammates with future NFL star Charlie Justice and later for the Pearl Harbor naval team. He was placed with an outgoing unit to be deployed to the combat zone in the Pacific at the time of the atomic bombings of Hiroshima and Nagasaki and subsequent end of the war.

In 1946, Sossamon resumed his professional football career, "trying to make a little money to buy a house with," he later recalled. He landed a spot on the roster of the New York Yankees, a team in the new All-America Football Conference (AAFC), a new professional league established as a rival to the NFL. Sossamon played for the Yankees during the 1946, 1947, and 1948 seasons, spending his rookie year as a reserve and starting at center and linebacker during the latter two campaigns. According to his recollection more than 50 years after the fact, his first contract paid him $10,000 for the 1946 season.

Among Sossamon's teammates with the Yankees were future Dallas Cowboys head coach Tom Landry and pioneering black running back Buddy Young, remembered by Sossamon as one of the best of his era.

== Life after football ==
After his football career was over, he went to work for his father, who had taken over from his own father as publisher of the Gaffney Register, a local newspaper. He would spend his career as a newspaperman, buying the Register from his father in 1968 and remaining in that position until his retirement in 1999.

Sossamon also served four terms as a member of the University of South Carolina board of trustees.

== Death and legacy ==
Sossamon died in Gaffney, South Carolina, on February 11, 2019, at the age of 97 of "natural causes," according to his surviving daughter, Kit Smith, who added, "basically of playing too much football." She noted that Sossamon had been "spry and charming" until the last six weeks of his life, during which time his health had rapidly declined.

Sossamon was married and had three children in all, later selling the Gaffney Register to a son to make that publication a rare four-generation family newspaper in the state of South Carolina.

Sossamon was named to the University of South Carolina Athletics Hall of Fame in 1968. He is also a member of the State of Carolina Hall of Fame.
