= Charlie Timmons =

American football player (1917–1996)

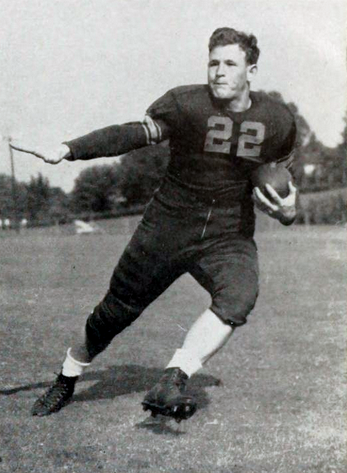
- Timmons at Clemson in 1941

No. 22, 91
- Positions: Fullback, linebacker

Personal information
- Born: February 8, 1917; Piedmont, South Carolina, U.S.
- Died: March 27, 1996 (aged 79); Greenville, South Carolina, U.S.
- Listed height: 5 ft 10 in (1.78 m)
- Listed weight: 210 lb (95 kg)

Career information
- High school: Abbeville (SC)
- College: Clemson (1938-1941); Georgia
- NFL draft: 1942: 19th round, 176th overall pick

Career history
- Brooklyn Dodgers (1946)

Awards and highlights
- 2× First-team All-SoCon (1940, 1941)

Career AAFC statistics
- Rushing yards: 65
- Rushing average: 2.8
- Receptions: 1
- Receiving yards: 4
- Stats at Pro Football Reference

Charles Truman Timmons (February 8, 1917 – March 27, 1996) was an American professional football fullback in the All-America Football Conference (AAFC) for the Brooklyn Dodgers. He played college football at the University of Georgia and Clemson College; as a sophomore at the 1940 Cotton Bowl, he rushed for 127 yards and scored the only touchdown in the 6–3 Clemson win.

Timmons was selected in the nineteenth round of the 1942 NFL draft by the Washington Redskins, but instead joined the U.S. Navy. During training, he played for the Georgia Pre-Flight Skycrackers football team.
