= 1942 All-Southern Conference football team =

American football team

The 1942 All-Southern Conference football team consists of American football players chosen by the Associated Press (AP) and United Press (UP) for the All-Southern Conference football team for the 1942 college football season.

== All-Southern Conference selections ==
=== Backs ===
- Tom Davis, Duke (AP-1)
- Red Cochran, Wake Forest (AP-1)
- Joe Muha, VMI (AP-1)
- Harvey Johnson, William & Mary (AP-1)
- Joe Austin, North Carolina (AP-2)
- Tommy Mont, Maryland (AP-2)
- Andy Victor, Citadel (AP-2)
- Dewey Proctor, Furman (AP-2)

=== Ends ===
- Bob Gantt, Duke (AP-1)
- Glenn Knox, William & Mary (AP-1)
- Marion Stilwell, NC State (AP-2)
- Jack Gilmore, Maryland (AP-2)

=== Tackles ===
- Pat Preston, Wake Forest (AP-1)
- Marvin Bass, William & Mary (AP-1)
- Harold Fields, William & Mary (AP-2)
- Joe Wolf, North Carolina (AP-2)

=== Guards ===
- Buster Ramsey, William & Mary (AP-1)
- Tom Burns, Duke (AP-1)
- Elmer Jones, Wake Forest (AP-2)
- Julius Minton, VMI (AP-2)

=== Centers ===
- Lou Sossamon, South Carolina (AP-1)
- Chan Highsmith, North Carolina (AP-2)

== Key ==
AP = Associated Press

UP = United Press

== See also ==
- 1942 College Football All-America Team
