= Art Faircloth =

American football player (1921–2010)

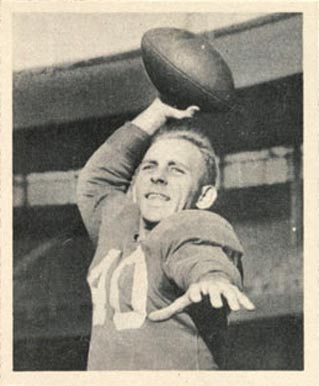
- Faircloth on a 1948 Bowman football card

No. 18, 40
- Position: Back

Personal information
- Born: July 8, 1921; Richmond, Virginia, U.S.
- Died: April 1, 2010 (aged 88); Fredericksburg, Virginia, U.S.
- Listed height: 6 ft 0 in (1.83 m)
- Listed weight: 190 lb (86 kg)

Career information
- High school: Anacostia (Washington, D.C.)
- College: NC State (1940–1942); Guilford (1946)
- NFL draft: 1944: 19th round, 197th overall pick

Career history
- Jersey City Giants (1947); New York Giants (1947–1948); Richmond Rebels (1948)

Awards and highlights
- First-team All-SoCon (1940)
- Stats at Pro Football Reference

Arthur Terman Faircloth (July 8, 1921 – April 1, 2010) was an American professional football player who played two seasons with the New York Giants of the National Football League (NFL). He played college football at North Carolina State University and Guilford College.

== Early life and college ==
Arthur Terman Faircloth was born on July 8, 1921, in Richmond, Virginia. He attended Anacostia High School in Washington, D.C.

Faircloth played for the NC State Wolfpack from 1940 to 1942. He was named Associated Press first-team All-Southern Conference in 1940. His football career was interrupted by a stint in the United States Army during World War II. After the war, he played for the Guilford Quakers in 1946 and earned all-conference honors.

== Professional career ==
Faircloth was selected by the Boston Yanks in the 19th round, with the 197th overall pick, of the 1944 NFL draft. He signed with the Yanks in 1947 but was released later that year.

In 1947, Faircloth played in the American Football League (AFL) for the Jersey City Giants, the farm team for the NFL's New York Giants. He played in all ten games, starting seven, for the Jersey City Giants that season, completing 92 of 174 passes (52.9%) for 1,122 yards, eight touchdowns, and seven interceptions. He also scored one rushing touchdown and punted 40 times for a 40-yard average. After the AFL season, he was recalled to the New York Giants on November 25, 1947. He appeared in three games for the New York Giants during the 1947 NFL season, completing three of five passes for 30 yards and a touchdown, ten rushing attempts for nine yards, four punts for 159 yards, two kick returns for 62 yards, and one fumble recovery. Faircloth played in two games for the Giants in 1948, intercepting three passes and recovering one fumble. He was released by the Giants in 1948.

Faircloth appeared in two games for the Richmond Rebels of the AFL in 1948, throwing one touchdown.

== Personal life ==
Faircloth died on April 1, 2010, in Fredericksburg, Virginia.
