= 1941 Richmond Spiders football team =

American college football season

1941 Richmond Spiders football
- Conference: Southern Conference
- Record: 2–7 (0–6 SoCon)
- Head coach: Glenn Thistlethwaite (8th season)
- Captain: Bert Milling
- Home stadium: City Stadium

1941 Southern Conference football standings
	Conf.					Overall
Team	W		L		T	W		L		T
No. 2 Duke +	5	–	0	–	0	9	–	1	–	0
South Carolina +	4	–	0	–	1	4	–	4	–	1
Clemson	5	–	1	–	0	7	–	2	–	0
William & Mary	4	–	1	–	0	8	–	2	–	0
VMI	4	–	2	–	0	4	–	6	–	0
VPI	4	–	2	–	0	6	–	4	–	0
Wake Forest	4	–	2	–	1	5	–	5	–	1
NC State	3	–	4	–	2	4	–	5	–	2
Furman	2	–	3	–	2	3	–	4	–	2
Washington and Lee	1	–	2	–	2	1	–	6	–	2
North Carolina	2	–	4	–	0	3	–	7	–	0
Maryland	1	–	2	–	0	3	–	5	–	1
Davidson	1	–	5	–	2	1	–	6	–	3
The Citadel	0	–	2	–	1	4	–	3	–	1
George Washington	0	–	4	–	1	1	–	7	–	1
Richmond	0	–	6	–	0	2	–	7	–	0
+ – Conference co-champions; Rankings from AP Poll

The 1941 Richmond Spiders football team was an American football team that represented the University of Richmond in the Southern Conference during the 1941 college football season. In their eighth and final season under head coach Glenn Thistlethwaite, the Spiders compiled a 2–7 record (0–6 against conference opponents), finished in last place in the conference, and were outscored by a total of 184 to 57.

Richmond was ranked at No. 254 (out of 681 teams) in the final rankings under the Litkenhous Difference by Score System.

The team played its home games at City Stadium in Richmond, Virginia.

== Schedule ==
Date	Opponent	Site	Result	Attendance	Source
September 20	at NC State	Riddick Stadium; Raleigh, NC	L 7–14	9,000	
September 27	Randolph–Macon*	City Stadium; Richmond, VA	W 26–0		
October 11	at Virginia*	Scott Stadium; Charlottesville, VA	L 0–44	10,000	
October 18	Washington & Lee	City Stadium; Richmond, VA	L 0–21	6,000	
October 25	VMI	City Stadium; Richmond, VA (rivalry)	L 7–25		
November 1	Hampden–Sydney*	City Stadium; Richmond, VA	W 14–7		
November 8	North Carolina	City Stadium; Richmond, VA	L 0–27	2,500	
November 20	William & Mary	City Stadium; Richmond, VA (rivalry)	L 3–33	12,000	
November 29	at VPI	Miles Stadium; Blacksburg, VA	L 0–13	4,000	
*Non-conference game
