= 1941 Washington and Lee Generals football team =

American college football season

1941 Washington and Lee Generals football
- Conference: Southern Conference
- Record: 1–6–2 (1–2–2 SoCon)
- Head coach: Riley Smith (1st season)
- Home stadium: Wilson Field

1941 Southern Conference football standings
	Conf.					Overall
Team	W		L		T	W		L		T
No. 2 Duke +	5	–	0	–	0	9	–	1	–	0
South Carolina +	4	–	0	–	1	4	–	4	–	1
Clemson	5	–	1	–	0	7	–	2	–	0
William & Mary	4	–	1	–	0	8	–	2	–	0
VMI	4	–	2	–	0	4	–	6	–	0
VPI	4	–	2	–	0	6	–	4	–	0
Wake Forest	4	–	2	–	1	5	–	5	–	1
NC State	3	–	4	–	2	4	–	5	–	2
Furman	2	–	3	–	2	3	–	4	–	2
Washington and Lee	1	–	2	–	2	1	–	6	–	2
North Carolina	2	–	4	–	0	3	–	7	–	0
Maryland	1	–	2	–	0	3	–	5	–	1
Davidson	1	–	5	–	2	1	–	6	–	3
The Citadel	0	–	2	–	1	4	–	3	–	1
George Washington	0	–	4	–	1	1	–	7	–	1
Richmond	0	–	6	–	0	2	–	7	–	0
+ – Conference co-champions; Rankings from AP Poll

The 1941 Washington and Lee Generals football team was an American football team that represented Washington and Lee University as a member of the Southern Conference during the 1941 college football season. In its first and only season under head coach Riley Smith, the team compiled a 1–6–2 record (1–2–2 against conference opponents), finished in fifth place in the conference, and was outscored by a total of 93 to 69.

Washington and Lee was ranked at No. 133 (out of 681 teams) in the final rankings under the Litkenhous Difference by Score System for 1941.

== Schedule ==
Date	Opponent	Site	Result	Attendance	Source
September 26	Sewanee*	Wilson Field; Lexington, VA	L 19–20	3,000	
October 4	Kentucky*	Wilson Field; Lexington, VA	L 0–7	3,000	
October 10	at George Washington	Griffith Stadium; Washington, D.C.	T 0–0	7,000	
October 18	at Richmond	City Stadium; Richmond, VA	W 21–0	6,000	
October 25	vs. VPI	Municipal Stadium; Lynchburg, VA	L 3–13	6,000	
November 1	vs. West Virginia	Laidley Field; Charleston, WV	L 6–7	9,300	
November 8	at Virginia*	Scott Stadium; Charlottesville, VA	L 7–27	6,000	
November 15	Davidson	Wilson Field; Lexington, VA	T 13–13	7,000	
November 20	at Maryland	Baltimore Stadium; Baltimore, MD	L 0–6	3,000	
*Non-conference game
