= 1941 Maryland Terrapins football team =

American college football season

1941 Maryland Terrapins football
- Conference: Southern Conference
- Record: 3–5–1 (1–2 SoCon)
- Head coach: Jack Faber (3rd season)
- Home stadium: Old Byrd Stadium, Baltimore Stadium

1941 Southern Conference football standings
	Conf.					Overall
Team	W		L		T	W		L		T
No. 2 Duke +	5	–	0	–	0	9	–	1	–	0
South Carolina +	4	–	0	–	1	4	–	4	–	1
Clemson	5	–	1	–	0	7	–	2	–	0
William & Mary	4	–	1	–	0	8	–	2	–	0
VMI	4	–	2	–	0	4	–	6	–	0
VPI	4	–	2	–	0	6	–	4	–	0
Wake Forest	4	–	2	–	1	5	–	5	–	1
NC State	3	–	4	–	2	4	–	5	–	2
Furman	2	–	3	–	2	3	–	4	–	2
Washington and Lee	1	–	2	–	2	1	–	6	–	2
North Carolina	2	–	4	–	0	3	–	7	–	0
Maryland	1	–	2	–	0	3	–	5	–	1
Davidson	1	–	5	–	2	1	–	6	–	3
The Citadel	0	–	2	–	1	4	–	3	–	1
George Washington	0	–	4	–	1	1	–	7	–	1
Richmond	0	–	6	–	0	2	–	7	–	0
+ – Conference co-champions; Rankings from AP Poll

The 1941 Maryland Terrapins football team represented the University of Maryland in the 1941 college football season. In their third season under head coach Jack Faber, the Terrapins compiled a 3–5–1 record (1–2 in conference), finished in 12th place in the Southern Conference, and outscored their opponents 196 to 49.

Maryland was ranked at No. 232 (out of 681 teams) in the final rankings under the Litkenhous Difference by Score System.

The team played its home games at Old Byrd Stadium in College Park, Maryland (three games), and at Baltimore Stadium in Baltimore (three games).

== Schedule ==
Date	Opponent	Site	Result	Attendance	Source
September 27	Hampden–Sydney*	Old Byrd Stadium; College Park, MD	W 18–0	7,000	
October 3	Western Maryland*	Baltimore Stadium; Baltimore, MD	T 6–6	12,000	
October 11	Duke	Baltimore Stadium; Baltimore, MD	L 0–50	12,000	
October 18	Florida*	Old Byrd Stadium; College Park, MD	W 13–12	7,500	
October 25	at No. 12 Penn*	Franklin Field; Philadelphia, PA	L 6–55	40,000	
November 1	at Rutgers*	Rutgers Stadium; New Brunswick, NJ	L 0–20	1,500	
November 8	at Georgetown*	Griffith Stadium; Washington, D.C.	L 0–26	7,500	
November 15	VMI*	Old Byrd Stadium; College Park, MD	L 0–27		
November 20	Washington & Lee	Baltimore Stadium; Baltimore, MD	W 6–0	3,000	
*Non-conference game; Rankings from AP Poll released prior to the game
