= Edward Bradley (colonel) =

American military leader

Edward Bradley was an American military colonel who served in the American Revolution, the War of 1812, and the Creek War. Bradley County, Tennessee, is named in his honor.

== Biography ==
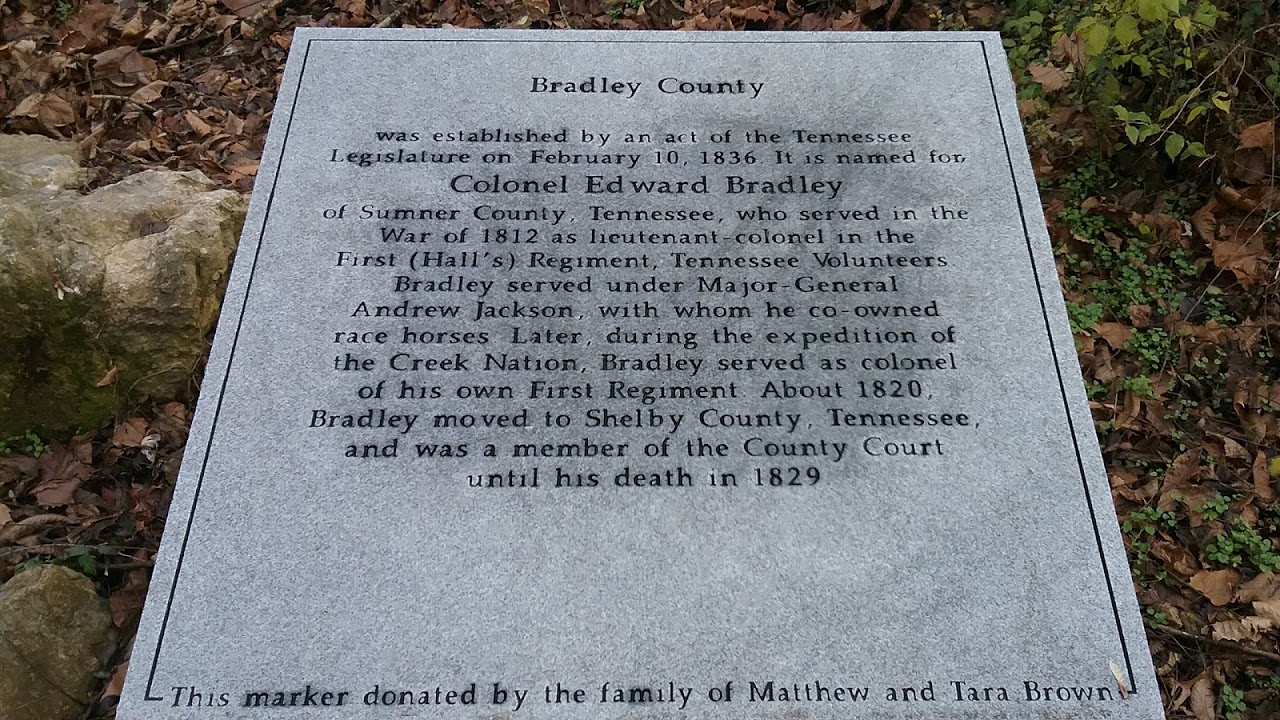
Historical marker about Bradley in Cleveland, the seat of Bradley County, Tennessee

Edward Bradley was born in Sumner County, Tennessee. During the American Revolution, Bradley served as colonel of Hale's Regiment of Militia. He served as Lieutenant Colonel in the 15th Regiment of the Tennessee Volunteers during the War of 1812. He also served in the Creek War.

Although much is unknown about Bradley, he was a horse racing enthusiast, having helped construct a track in Nashville and create a Jockey Club there, and was friends with Andrew Jackson, with whom he co-owned race horses. Bradley moved to Shelby County, Tennessee, around 1820. He was also a landowner in Davidson County. Bradley served on the Shelby County Court until his death in 1829.

After Bradley's death, a movement arose to perpetuate his memory. The Tennessee General Assembly created Bradley County on February 10, 1836, naming it in his honor.

== See also ==
- Edward Bradley
