= 1941 Furman Purple Hurricane football team =

American college football season

1941 Furman Purple Hurricane football
- Conference: Southern Conference
- Record: 3–4–2 (2–3–2 SoCon)
- Head coach: Dizzy McLeod (10th season)
- Captains: Bill Cornwall; Hazel Gilstrap; George Turner
- Home stadium: Sirrine Stadium

1941 Southern Conference football standings
	Conf.					Overall
Team	W		L		T	W		L		T
No. 2 Duke +	5	–	0	–	0	9	–	1	–	0
South Carolina +	4	–	0	–	1	4	–	4	–	1
Clemson	5	–	1	–	0	7	–	2	–	0
William & Mary	4	–	1	–	0	8	–	2	–	0
VMI	4	–	2	–	0	4	–	6	–	0
VPI	4	–	2	–	0	6	–	4	–	0
Wake Forest	4	–	2	–	1	5	–	5	–	1
NC State	3	–	4	–	2	4	–	5	–	2
Furman	2	–	3	–	2	3	–	4	–	2
Washington and Lee	1	–	2	–	2	1	–	6	–	2
North Carolina	2	–	4	–	0	3	–	7	–	0
Maryland	1	–	2	–	0	3	–	5	–	1
Davidson	1	–	5	–	2	1	–	6	–	3
The Citadel	0	–	2	–	1	4	–	3	–	1
George Washington	0	–	4	–	1	1	–	7	–	1
Richmond	0	–	6	–	0	2	–	7	–	0
+ – Conference co-champions; Rankings from AP Poll

The 1941 Furman Purple Hurricane football team was an American football team that represented Furman University as a member of the Southern Conference (SoCon) during the 1941 college football season. In its 10th season under head coach Dizzy McLeod, the team compiled a 3–4–2 record (2–3–2 against conference opponents), finished in ninth place in the conference, and was outscored by a total of 195 to 129.

Furman was ranked at No. 138 (out of 681 teams) in the final rankings under the Litkenhous Difference by Score System for 1941.

The team played its home games at Sirrine Stadium in Greenville, South Carolina.

== Schedule ==
Date	Opponent	Site	Result	Attendance	Source
September 20	at Tennessee*	Shields–Watkins Field; Knoxville, TN	L 6–32	12,000	
September 26	Wofford*	Sirrine Stadium; Greenville, SC (rivalry)	W 40–19	4,500	
October 4	Wake Forest	Sirrine Stadium; Greenville, SC	L 13–52	8,000	
October 11	NC State	Sirrine Stadium; Greenville, SC	T 0–0	6,000	
October 18	at The Citadel	Johnson Hagood Stadium (rivalry); Charleston, SC	T 13–13	7,000	
October 25	vs. Davidson	American Legion Memorial Stadium; Charlotte, NC	W 31–13		
November 8	George Washington	Sirrine Stadium; Greenville, SC	W 13–6	5,000	
November 15	at South Carolina	Carolina Stadium; Columbia, SC	L 7–26	12,000	
November 22	No. 18 Clemson	Sirrine Stadium; Greenville, SC	L 6–34	18,000	
*Non-conference game; Rankings from AP Poll released prior to the game
