= 1940 All-Southern Conference football team =

The 1940 All-Southern Conference football team consists of American football players chosen by the Associated Press (AP) and United Press (UP) for the All-Southern Conference football team for the 1940 college football season.

== All-Southern Conference selections ==
=== Backs ===
- Jim Lalanne, North Carolina (AP-1)
- Steve Lach, Duke (AP-1) (College Football Hall of Fame)
- Tony Gallovich, Wake Forest (AP-1)
- Charlie Timmons, Clemson (AP-1)
- Art Jones, Richmond (AP-2)
- Al Grygo, South Carolina (AP-2)
- Ed "Chippy" Maness, Clemson (AP-2)
- Jasper Davis, Duke (AP-2)

=== Ends ===
- Joe Blalock, Clemson (AP-1)
- Paul Severin, North Carolina (AP-1)
- Leonard Darnell, Duke (AP-2)
- Johnny Jett, Wake Forest (AP-2)

=== Tackles ===
- Andy Fronczek, Richmond (AP-1)
- Tony Ruffa, Duke (AP-1)
- Gates Kimball, North Carolina (AP-2)
- George Fritts, Clemson (AP-2)

=== Guards ===
- Alex Winterson, Duke (AP-1)
- Art Faircloth, NC State (AP-1)
- Billy Walker, VMI (AP-2)
- Dick Caton, NC State (AP-2)

=== Centers ===
- Bob Barnett, Duke (AP-1)
- Red Sharpe, Clemson (AP-2)

== Key ==
AP = Associated Press

UP = United Press

== See also ==
- 1940 College Football All-America Team
