= 1941 George Washington Colonials football team =

American college football season

1941 George Washington Colonials football
- Conference: Southern Conference
- Record: 1–7–1 (0–4–1 SoCon)
- Head coach: Bill Reinhart (4th season)
- Home stadium: Griffith Stadium

1941 Southern Conference football standings
	Conf.					Overall
Team	W		L		T	W		L		T
No. 2 Duke +	5	–	0	–	0	9	–	1	–	0
South Carolina +	4	–	0	–	1	4	–	4	–	1
Clemson	5	–	1	–	0	7	–	2	–	0
William & Mary	4	–	1	–	0	8	–	2	–	0
VMI	4	–	2	–	0	4	–	6	–	0
VPI	4	–	2	–	0	6	–	4	–	0
Wake Forest	4	–	2	–	1	5	–	5	–	1
NC State	3	–	4	–	2	4	–	5	–	2
Furman	2	–	3	–	2	3	–	4	–	2
Washington and Lee	1	–	2	–	2	1	–	6	–	2
North Carolina	2	–	4	–	0	3	–	7	–	0
Maryland	1	–	2	–	0	3	–	5	–	1
Davidson	1	–	5	–	2	1	–	6	–	3
The Citadel	0	–	2	–	1	4	–	3	–	1
George Washington	0	–	4	–	1	1	–	7	–	1
Richmond	0	–	6	–	0	2	–	7	–	0
+ – Conference co-champions; Rankings from AP Poll

The 1941 George Washington Colonials football team was an American football team that represented George Washington University in the Southern Conference during the 1941 college football season. In its fourth season under head coach Bill Reinhart, the team compiled a 1–7–1 record (0–4–1 against conference opponents), finished in 14th place in the Southern Conference, and was outscored by a total of 176 to 31. The team played its home games at Griffith Stadium in Washington, D.C.

== Schedule ==
Date	Opponent	Site	Result	Attendance	Source
September 27	Mount St. Mary's*	Griffith Stadium; Washington, DC	W 25–0		
October 3	at Manhattan*	Polo Grounds; New York, NY	L 0–23	7,032	
October 10	Washington & Lee	Griffith Stadium; Washington, DC	T 0–0	7,000	
October 18	Georgetown*	Griffith Stadium; Washington, DC	L 0–25	16,000	
October 25	William & Mary	Griffith Stadium; Washington, DC	L 0–48	8,000	
October 31	Clemson	Griffith Stadium; Washington, DC	L 0–19	6,000	
November 8	at Furman	Sirrine Stadium; Greenville, SC	L 6–13	5,000	
November 14	Bucknell*	Griffith Stadium; Washington, DC	L 0–6	6,000	
November 20	Wake Forest	Griffith Stadium; Washington, DC	L 0–42	5,000	
*Non-conference game
