= 1941 The Citadel Bulldogs football team =

American college football season

1941 The Citadel Bulldogs football
- Conference: Southern Conference
- Record: 4–3–1 (0–2–1 SoCon)
- Head coach: Bo Rowland (2nd season)
- Home stadium: Johnson Hagood Stadium

1941 Southern Conference football standings
| | Conf. | | | | | Overall |
| Team | W | | L | | T | W | | L | | T |
|---|---|---|---|---|---|---|---|---|---|---|
| No. 2 Duke + | 5 | – | 0 | – | 0 | 9 | – | 1 | – | 0 |
| South Carolina + | 4 | – | 0 | – | 1 | 4 | – | 4 | – | 1 |
| Clemson | 5 | – | 1 | – | 0 | 7 | – | 2 | – | 0 |
| William & Mary | 4 | – | 1 | – | 0 | 8 | – | 2 | – | 0 |
| VMI | 4 | – | 2 | – | 0 | 4 | – | 6 | – | 0 |
| VPI | 4 | – | 2 | – | 0 | 6 | – | 4 | – | 0 |
| Wake Forest | 4 | – | 2 | – | 1 | 5 | – | 5 | – | 1 |
| NC State | 3 | – | 4 | – | 2 | 4 | – | 5 | – | 2 |
| Furman | 2 | – | 3 | – | 2 | 3 | – | 4 | – | 2 |
| Washington and Lee | 1 | – | 2 | – | 2 | 1 | – | 6 | – | 2 |
| North Carolina | 2 | – | 4 | – | 0 | 3 | – | 7 | – | 0 |
| Maryland | 1 | – | 2 | – | 0 | 3 | – | 5 | – | 1 |
| Davidson | 1 | – | 5 | – | 2 | 1 | – | 6 | – | 3 |
| The Citadel | 0 | – | 2 | – | 1 | 4 | – | 3 | – | 1 |
| George Washington | 0 | – | 4 | – | 1 | 1 | – | 7 | – | 1 |
| Richmond | 0 | – | 6 | – | 0 | 2 | – | 7 | – | 0 |
+ – Conference co-champions; Rankings from AP Poll

The 1941 The Citadel Bulldogs football team was an American football team that represented The Citadel, The Military College of South Carolina as a member of the Southern Conference during the 1941 college football season. In their second season under head coach Bo Rowland, the Bulldogs compiled a 4–3–1 record (0–2–1 against conference opponents), finished 14th in the conference, and outscored opponents by a total of 175 to 89. The Bulldogs played home games at Johnson Hagood Stadium.

The Citadel was ranked at No. 109 (out of 681 teams) in the final rankings under the Litkenhous Difference by Score System for 1941.

== Schedule ==
| Date | Opponent | Site | Result | Attendance | Source |
|---|---|---|---|---|---|
| September 27 | High Point* | Johnson Hagood Stadium; Charleston, SC | W 45–0 | 5,000 | |
| October 4 | at Army* | Mitchie Stadium; West Point, NY | L 6–19 | 7,000 | |
| October 10 | vs. Presbyterian* | Sumter County Fair Grounds; Sumter, SC | W 21–13 | | |
| October 18 | Furman | Johnson Hagood Stadium; Charleston, SC (rivalry) | T 13–13 | 7,000 | |
| October 31 | vs. South Carolina | County Fairgrounds; Orangeburg, SC | L 6–13 | 10,000 | |
| November 8 | Wofford* | Johnson Hagood Stadium; Charleston, SC (rivalry) | W 42–7 | 6,000 | |
| November 20 | vs. Davidson | American Legion Memorial Stadium; Charlotte, NC | L 14–24 | 5,000 | |
| November 29 | Sewanee* | Johnson Hagood Stadium; Charleston, SC | W 28–0 | | |
*Non-conference game
