= Tony Gallovich =

American football player (1917–1999)

- Gallovich with trombone, 1940

No. 1, 75, 49
- Position: Halfback

Personal information
- Born: September 10, 1917; Vandergrift, Pennsylvania, U.S.
- Died: April 18, 1999 (aged 81); Richmond, Virginia, U.S.
- Listed height: 5 ft 9 in (1.75 m)
- Listed weight: 170 lb (77 kg)

Career information
- High school: Vandergrift
- College: Wake Forest (1937-1940)
- NFL draft: 1941: 8th round, 64th overall pick

Career history
- Cleveland Rams (1941); Richmond Rebels (1946–1947)

Awards and highlights
- First-team All-SoCon (1940)

Career NFL statistics
- Rushing yards: 1
- Stats at Pro Football Reference

Anthony Richard "Galloping Tony" Gallovich (September 10, 1917 – April 18, 1999) was an American professional football player.

A native of Vandergrift, Pennsylvania, Gallovich played college football for Wake Forest from 1938 to 1940. He led the Southern Conference in scoring in 1940 with 63 points (nine touchdowns and nine extra point kicks) and was also selected as a first-team player on the 1940 All-Southern Conference football team. He also handled place-kicking, gained 809 yards and returned 35 punts for 400 yards in 1940.

He played professional football in the National Football League (NFL) as a back for the Cleveland Rams. He appeared in three NFL games during the 1941 season. He finished the 1941 season with the Richmond Arrows of the Dixie League.

In March 1942, following the entry of the United States into World War II, Gallovich enlisted in the U.S. Navy. He was married in February 1943 to Mary Alice Garner.

Gallovich returned to professional football in 1946 and 1947 with the Richmond Rebels of the Dixie League. He finished the 1946 season ranked second in the Dixie League in scoring (43 points), rushing yards (447 yards on 103 carries), and extra points (13).
