= 1941 NC State Wolfpack football team =

American college football season

1941 NC State Wolfpack football
- Conference: Southern Conference
- Record: 4–5–2 (3–4–2 SoCon)
- Head coach: Williams Newton (5th season)
- Home stadium: Riddick Stadium

1941 Southern Conference football standings
	Conf.					Overall
Team	W		L		T	W		L		T
No. 2 Duke +	5	–	0	–	0	9	–	1	–	0
South Carolina +	4	–	0	–	1	4	–	4	–	1
Clemson	5	–	1	–	0	7	–	2	–	0
William & Mary	4	–	1	–	0	8	–	2	–	0
VMI	4	–	2	–	0	4	–	6	–	0
VPI	4	–	2	–	0	6	–	4	–	0
Wake Forest	4	–	2	–	1	5	–	5	–	1
NC State	3	–	4	–	2	4	–	5	–	2
Furman	2	–	3	–	2	3	–	4	–	2
Washington and Lee	1	–	2	–	2	1	–	6	–	2
North Carolina	2	–	4	–	0	3	–	7	–	0
Maryland	1	–	2	–	0	3	–	5	–	1
Davidson	1	–	5	–	2	1	–	6	–	3
The Citadel	0	–	2	–	1	4	–	3	–	1
George Washington	0	–	4	–	1	1	–	7	–	1
Richmond	0	–	6	–	0	2	–	7	–	0
+ – Conference co-champions; Rankings from AP Poll

The 1941 NC State Wolfpack football team was an American football team that represented North Carolina State University as a member of the Southern Conference (SoCon) during the 1941 college football season. In its fifth season under head coach Williams Newton, the Wolfpack compiled a 4–5–2 record (3–4–2 against SoCon opponents), finished eight in the conference, and was outscored by a total of 143 to 122.

== Schedule ==
Date	Opponent	Site	Result	Attendance	Source
September 20	Richmond	Riddick Stadium; Raleigh, NC	W 14–7	9,000	
September 27	vs. Davidson	World War Memorial Stadium; Greensboro, NC	T 6–6	10,000	
October 4	vs. Clemson	Municipal Stadium; Charlotte, NC (rivalry)	L 6–27	15,000	
October 11	at Furman	Sirrine Stadium; Greenville, SC	T 0–0	6,000	
October 18	Wake Forest	Riddick Stadium; Raleigh, NC (rivalry)	L 0–7	15,000	
October 25	Newberry*	Riddick Stadium; Raleigh, NC	W 44–0		
November 1	at North Carolina	Kenan Memorial Stadium; Chapel Hill, NC (rivalry)	W 13–7	17,500	
November 8	VPI	Bowman Gray Stadium; Winston-Salem, NC	L 13–14	10,000	
November 15	at Georgetown*	Griffith Stadium; Washington, D.C.	L 7–20		
November 22	No. 3 Duke	Riddick Stadium; Raleigh, NC (rivalry)	L 6–55	15,000	
November 29	at William & Mary	Cary Field; Williamsburg, VA	W 13–0	6,000	
*Non-conference game; Rankings from AP Poll released prior to the game
