= 1941 Davidson Wildcats football team =

American college football season

1941 Davidson Wildcats football
- Conference: Southern Conference
- Record: 1–6–3 (1–5–2 SoCon)
- Head coach: Gene McEver (6th season)
- Home stadium: Richardson Stadium

1941 Southern Conference football standings
	Conf.					Overall
Team	W		L		T	W		L		T
No. 2 Duke +	5	–	0	–	0	9	–	1	–	0
South Carolina +	4	–	0	–	1	4	–	4	–	1
Clemson	5	–	1	–	0	7	–	2	–	0
William & Mary	4	–	1	–	0	8	–	2	–	0
VMI	4	–	2	–	0	4	–	6	–	0
VPI	4	–	2	–	0	6	–	4	–	0
Wake Forest	4	–	2	–	1	5	–	5	–	1
NC State	3	–	4	–	2	4	–	5	–	2
Furman	2	–	3	–	2	3	–	4	–	2
Washington and Lee	1	–	2	–	2	1	–	6	–	2
North Carolina	2	–	4	–	0	3	–	7	–	0
Maryland	1	–	2	–	0	3	–	5	–	1
Davidson	1	–	5	–	2	1	–	6	–	3
The Citadel	0	–	2	–	1	4	–	3	–	1
George Washington	0	–	4	–	1	1	–	7	–	1
Richmond	0	–	6	–	0	2	–	7	–	0
+ – Conference co-champions; Rankings from AP Poll

The 1941 Davidson Wildcats football team was an American football team that represented Davidson University as a member of the Southern Conference during the 1941 college football season. In their sixth season under head coach Gene McEver, the Wildcats compiled a 1–6–3 record (1–5–2 against SoCon opponents), finished 13th in the conference, and were outscored by a total of 176 to 63. The team was shut out in five of its ten games.

Davidson was ranked at No. 151 (out of 681 teams) in the final rankings under the Litkenhous Difference by Score System for 1941.

Home games were played at Richardson Stadium in Davidson, North Carolina.

McEver was later inducted into the College Football Hall of Fame.

== Schedule ==
Date	Opponent	Site	Result	Attendance	Source
September 20	Rollins*	Richardson Stadium; Davidson, NC	T 0–0	3,000	
September 27	vs. NC State	World War Memorial Stadium; Greensboro, NC	T 6–6	10,000	
October 4	North Carolina	Richardson Stadium; Davidson, NC	L 0–20		
October 11	at Sewanee	Chamberlain Field; Chattanooga, TN	L 0–7		
October 18	VPI	Richardson Stadium; Davidson, NC	L 0–16	5,000	
October 25	vs. Furman	American Legion Memorial Stadium; Charlotte, NC	L 13–31		
November 1	at VMI	Municipal Stadium; Lynchburg, VA	L 7–13	1,000	
November 8	No. 4 Duke	Richardson Stadium; Davidson, NC	L 0–56	10,000	
November 15	at Washington and Lee	Wilson Field; Lexington, VA	T 13–13	7,000	
November 22	vs. The Citadel	American Legion Memorial Stadium; Charlotte, NC	W 24–14	5,000	
*Non-conference game; Rankings from AP Poll released prior to the game
