= Al Grygo =

American football player (1918–1971)

No. 32
- Position: Running back/Quarterback

Personal information
- Born: August 14, 1918; Erie, Pennsylvania, U.S.
- Died: September 27, 1971 (aged 53); Columbia, South Carolina, U.S.

Career information
- College: South Carolina

Career history
- Chicago Bears (1944–1945)

Awards and highlights
- Second-team All-SoCon (1940)

Career statistics
- Rushing yards: 420
- Touchdowns: 3
- Stats at Pro Football Reference

Aloysius Joseph Grygo (August 14, 1918 – September 27, 1971) was an American football running back and quarterback in the National Football League (NFL). He played for the Chicago Bears. He played college football for the South Carolina Gamecocks.
