= Elmer Jones =

American football player (1920–1996)

No. 34, 73, 62
- Position: Guard

Personal information
- Born: August 4, 1920; Buffalo, New York, U.S.
- Died: February 21, 1996 (aged 75); New Smyrna Beach, Florida, U.S.
- Listed height: 6 ft 0 in (1.83 m)
- Listed weight: 224 lb (102 kg)

Career information
- High school: Tonawanda (NY)
- College: Franklin & Marshall, Wake Forest
- NFL draft: 1946: 2nd round, 15th overall pick

Career history
- Buffalo Bisons (1946); Detroit Lions (1947–1948)

Awards and highlights
- Second-team All-SoCon (1942)

Career NFL statistics
- Games played: 31
- Interceptions: 2
- Stats at Pro Football Reference

Elmer John Jones Jr. (August 4, 1920 – February 21, 1996) was an American professional football guard.

Jones was born in Buffalo, New York, and attended Tonawanda High School. He played college football for Franklin & Marshall and Wake Forest.

He was selected by the New York Giants in the second round (15th overall pick) of the 1946 NFL draft, but did not play for the Giants. He instead played football in the All-America Football Conference (AAFC) for the Buffalo Bisons in 1946 and then for the Detroit Lions of the National Football League (NFL) in 1947 and 1948. He appeared in 31 games, three as a starter.

Jones died in 1996 in New Smyrna Beach, Florida.
