= Noah Mullins =

American football player (1918–1998)

No. 10, 20
- Positions: Running back, defensive back

Personal information
- Born: May 23, 1918; Midway, Kentucky, U.S.
- Died: October 31, 1998 (aged 80); Versailles, Kentucky, U.S.
- Listed height: 5 ft 11 in (1.80 m)
- Listed weight: 182 lb (83 kg)

Career information
- High school: Woodford County (Versailles)
- College: Kentucky (1938–1941)
- NFL draft: 1942: 10th round, 90th overall pick

Career history
- Chicago Bears (1946–1948); New York Giants (1949)

Awards and highlights
- NFL champion (1946)

Career NFL statistics
- Rushing yards: 362
- Touchdowns: 6
- Interceptions: 19
- Stats at Pro Football Reference

Noah Walker Mullins (May 23, 1918 – October 31, 1998) was an American professional football player who was a running back, quarterback and defensive back in the National Football League (NFL). He played for the Chicago Bears and New York Giants. He played college football for the Kentucky Wildcats.
