= Stan Stasica =

American gridiron football player (1919–2012)

No. 85
- Positions: Halfback, defensive back, quarterback

Personal information
- Born: June 24, 1919; Rockford, Illinois, U.S.
- Died: July 21, 2012 (aged 93); Wheat Ridge, Colorado, U.S.
- Listed height: 5 ft 10 in (1.78 m)
- Listed weight: 175 lb (79 kg)

Career information
- High school: Rockford Central
- College: South Carolina (1941); Illinois (1945)
- NFL draft: 1944: 8th round, 75th overall pick

Career history
- Miami Seahawks (1946); Saskatchewan Roughriders (1947)

Awards and highlights
- CFL Western All-Star (1947); First-team All-SoCon (1941)
- Stats at Pro Football Reference

Stanley Joseph Stasica (June 24, 1919 – July 21, 2012) was an American and Canadian football player who played for the Miami Seahawks and Regina Roughriders. He played college football at South Carolina University before transferring to the University of Illinois at Urbana–Champaign.
