= Mike Karmazin =

American football player (1919–2004)

No. 30
- Position: Guard

Personal information
- Born: July 16, 1919; Monongahela, Pennsylvania, U.S.
- Died: January 21, 2004 (aged 84); New Orleans, Louisiana, U.S.
- Listed height: 5 ft 11 in (1.80 m)
- Listed weight: 210 lb (95 kg)

Career information
- High school: Norwin (PA)
- College: Duke
- NFL draft: 1946: 24th round, 222nd overall pick

Career history
- New York Yankees (1946); Paterson Panthers (1947)

Awards and highlights
- Third-team All-American (1941); First-team All-SoCon (1941)

Career AAFC statistics
- Games played: 10
- Stats at Pro Football Reference

Michael Laurence Karmazin (July 16, 1919 – January 21, 2004) was a professional American football guard and college football coach.

Prior to playing at the professional level, Karmazin played college football at Duke University. He was drafted in 1946 in the 24th round by the Boston Yanks of the National Football League (NFL), but he played in the rival All-America Football Conference (AAFC) for the New York Yankees in 1946. He played professionally again in 1947, for the Paterson Panthers of the American Association.

Later in life, Karmazin was a lawyer, and was a member of the prosecution team in the Clay Shaw trial in New Orleans.

== Early life and education ==
Karmazin was born in Monongahela, Pennsylvania and raised in Irwin, Pennsylvania, the son of Peter Karmazin and Mary Dikun Karmazin. His parents were both Slovak immigrants; his father was a miner. He attended Duke University, where was a member of the football team under coach Wallace Wade. He earned All-America and All-Southern Conference honors in 1941. During the 1942 Rose Bowl, he tackled Don Durdan for a safety, in a 20–16 loss to Oregon State.

In 1962 Karmazin earned a law degree from Tulane University.

== Career ==
Karmazin served in the United States Coast Guard during World War II. He played professional football with the New York Yankees in 1946, and then with the Paterson Panthers in 1947.

Karmazin was an assistant football coach at Duke from 1948 to 1951, head coachat Fork Union Military Academy in Virginia in 1951, and head line coach at North Carolina State University from 1952 to 1953. He was a line coach at Tulane University in the 1950s.

After his sports career, Karmazin became a lawyer. He was an assistant district attorney in New Orleans from 1962 to 1972, and ran for a seat on the juvenile court bench there in 1972. In 1967, he assisted district attorney Jim Garrison in the conspiracy trial of Clay Shaw, later dramatized in the 1991 film JFK. In 1974 he was convicted of failure to file timely tax returns and sentenced to 60 days in prison.

== Personal life ==
Karmazin married Elizabeth Spink; they had four children. He died in 2004, at age 84, in New Orleans. His grave is in Biloxi National Cemetery in Mississippi.
