= Beaumont, Virginia =

Unincorporated community in Virginia, US

Coordinates: 37°39′56″N 77°54′29″W

Beaumont is an unincorporated community in Powhatan County, in the U.S. state of Virginia. Beaumont has its own postal zip code, 23014. The Beaumont Correctional Center is now an adult residential facility operated by the Virginia Department of Corrections in the Central Region. It is a median level security prison (level 3 out of 5).
