= Red Cochran =

American football player and coach (1922–2004)

No. 24
- Positions: Cornerback, return specialist, punter, running back

Personal information
- Born: August 2, 1922; Fairfield, Alabama, U.S.
- Died: September 5, 2004 (aged 82); Green Bay, Wisconsin, U.S.
- Listed height: 6 ft 0 in (1.83 m)
- Listed weight: 190 lb (86 kg)

Career information
- High school: Hueytown (AL)
- College: Wake Forest
- NFL draft: 1944: 8th round, 66th overall pick

Career history

Playing
- Chicago Cardinals (1947–1950)

Coaching
- Wake Forest (1951–1955); Detroit Lions (1956–1958) Quarterback/running back; Green Bay Packers (1959–1966) Quarterback/running back; St. Louis Cardinals (1968–1969) Quarterback/running back; San Diego Chargers (1970) Quarterback/running back; Green Bay Packers (1971–1974) Quarterback/running back

Operations
- Green Bay Packers (1975–2004) Scout

Awards and highlights
- NFL champion (1947); Green Bay Packers Hall of Fame (1997); First-team All-SoCon (1942)

Career NFL statistics
- Rushing yards: 138
- Rushing average: 3.7
- Receptions: 8
- Receiving yards: 114
- Total touchdowns: 6
- Punts: 59
- Punt yards: 2,440
- Stats at Pro Football Reference

John Thurman "Red" Cochran Jr. (August 2, 1922 – September 5, 2004) was an American professional football cornerback and later an assistant coach and scout in the National Football League (NFL). He played college football at Wake Forest University.

== Playing career ==
Red grew up in Fairfield, Alabama and played high school football at Hueytown High School. Cochran received a scholarship to play football and baseball at Wake Forest University, then in Wake Forest, North Carolina, where he was the passing tailback in a single wing formation offense. He Played under Wake Forest Hall Of Fame Coach Douglas "Peahead" Walker. He made the All Southern Conference football team honors in 1942. On November 26, 1942, Cochran had an amazing day in a 33–14 win over South Carolina at Legion Memorial Stadium in Charlotte. In the first quarter, Cochran took a lateral pass and went 30 yards for a touchdown. In the third quarter, he broke through right tackle and went 54 yards for a score. Also in the third quarter, he sprinted 25 yards and threw a lateral to a teammate who went on to score. Cochran added a 57-yard punt return for a score in the third quarter and went 45 yards with an interception for a touchdown in the fourth quarter.

However, World War II broke out in the middle of his college career, he became a lieutenant in the United States Army Air Forces and served as a B-24 Liberator pilot with the Fourteenth Air Force in China as part of the 373rd Bomb Squadron, 308th Bomb Group.

Cochran completed his senior year eligibility in 1946 after his service. He also was a starting outfielder for Wake Forest batting in the #4 clean-up position as the teams power hitter. Later after his NFL pro football career was cut short by a career ending knee injury in 1950, he then returned as a Demon Deacons assistant coach from 1951 to 1955. He was inducted into the Wake Forest Sports Hall of Fame in 1973.

Cochran was drafted in the eighth round of the 1944 NFL draft by Card-Pitt (a merger of the Cardinals and Pittsburgh during World War II because of a lack of players). He played cornerback, return specialist, punter, and running back for the Chicago Cardinals from 1947 to 1950. Starting corner back as a rookie in 1947, he played on the Cardinals only NFL Championship team in 1947, when the Cardinals beat the Philadelphia Eagles 28–21 at Comisky Park in Chicago. In his first two seasons, Cochran had 15 interceptions in 24 games. Ranked 10th in NFL history for interceptions in first 2 seasons. In the 1948 NFL Championship game, Red intercepted the ball twice, in a close game won by the Philadelphia Eagles, 7–0.

Cochran holds the Cardinal team record for Punt Return Average at 20.9 yards/return, in 1949. He also led the NFL in 1949 in total kick return yardage with 724 yards (410-Kickoff, 314-Punt), including a lead leading 2 punt returns for touchdowns. Red also took over punting duties in 1949 with a 42.0 yard average for the season.

In addition to pro football, Cochran also played minor league baseball in the offseason in 1948 for the Goldsboro (NC) Goldbugs in the Class D Coastal Plain league. That season Red had a batting average of .254 and a slugging percentage of .338 in 36 games.

== Coaching career ==
After being an assistant coach at Wake Forest from 1951 to 1955, Cochran was hired for his first NFL coaching position an assistant coach for the Detroit Lions, where he would coach from 1956 to 1958. Red was the first assistant coach to be hired by Vince Lombardi for his staff as the offensive backfield (including quarterbacks)coach for the Packers, where he would coach from 1959 to 1966. There he helped mold the Pro Football Hall of Fame backfield of Bart Starr, Jim Taylor and Paul Hornung, from a team that was the worst team in the NFL and the worst team in Packer's history in 1958. The pair of Hornung and Taylor, along with Jerry Kramer and Fuzzy Thurston were known for the legendary Packer Sweep, part of the most feared running attack in the NFL during the Packer dynasty of the 1960s, averaging 153.8 yards rushing per game. After a year away from football, Cochran would coach for the St. Louis Cardinals (1968–1969) and the San Diego Chargers (1970). He then went back to Green Bay as offensive backfield coach (1971–1974), his last coaching position. Then, from 1975 until his death in 2004, he was a scout for the Packers.

Cochran's teams, in 52 years as a player (1947–1950), assistant coach (1956–1966, 1968–1974) and scout (1975–2004), played in 10 NFL championship games, and won seven. In 1997, he was inducted into the Green Bay Packers Hall of Fame.

In 2014 Cochran was posthumously inducted into his home state's Alabama Sports Hall of Fame in Birmingham, Alabama for his lifetime achievements in sports, primarily in football.
