= Joe Blalock =

American football player (1919–1974)

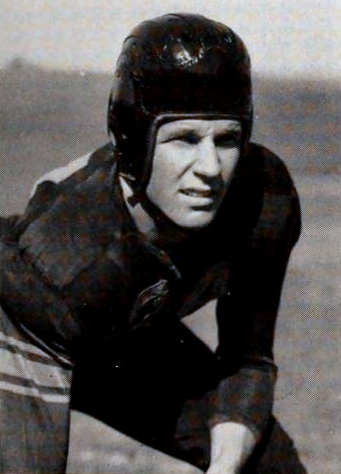
- Blalock at Clemson in 1941

Profile
- Position: End

Personal information
- Born: February 4, 1919; Charlotte, North Carolina, U.S.
- Died: August 21, 1974 (aged 55); Camden, South Carolina, U.S.

Career information
- College: Clemson (1941)

Awards and highlights
- First-team All-American (1941); Second-team All-American (1940); 3× First-team All-SoCon (1939, 1940, 1941)

Joseph Davis Blalock (February 4, 1919 – August 21, 1974) was an American football player. He played college football for the Clemson Tigers football team from 1939 to 1941 and was selected by both the Sporting News and the Central Press Association as a first-team end on the 1941 College Football All-America Team. He was also selected by the United Press as a second-team All-American in 1940. Clemson University claims him as the school's first two-time All-American. He was an inaugural inductee into the Clemson Hall of Fame in 1973. He died of a respiratory ailment in 1974 at age 55.
