= George Fritts =

American football player and coach (1919–1987)

Profile
- Positions: Guard, tackle

Personal information
- Born: December 30, 1919; Lenoir City, Tennessee, U.S.
- Died: February 7, 1987 (aged 67); Savannah, Georgia, U.S.
- Listed height: 5 ft 11 in (1.80 m)
- Listed weight: 205 lb (93 kg)

Career information
- High school: Lenoir City (Lenoir City, Tennessee)
- College: Clemson

Career history
- Philadelphia Eagles (1945)

Awards and highlights
- First-team All-SoCon (1941); Second-team All-SoCon (1940)
- Stats at Pro Football Reference

George Henry Fritts Jr. (December 30, 1919 – February 7, 1987) was an American football player and coach. A native of Lenoir City, Tennessee, Fritts attended Lenoir City High School before accepting a full scholarship to Clemson University. He played guard for the Clemson team from 1939 to 1942.

Fritts played in Clemson, first bowl game, the 1940 Cotton Bowl Classic. After serving in World War II, he was hired to coach the Columbus, Georgia, football team but a manager in the front office of the Philadelphia Eagles contacted him for completing his requirements for professional football. An earlier exposure to high levels of radiation during World War II left him with a disability which resulted in his loss of eyesight after three years of playing for Philadelphia.

Frank Howard hired him to be an assistant coach at Clemson and after a few years there he left to coach at Gaffney High School and Boiling Springs High School in South Carolina and Appling County High School and Groves High School in Georgia, later becoming a high school principal. In 1977, he was inducted in the Clemson University Hall of Fame. and was recognized as a first-team all-century team at Clemson in 1998.

He died on February 7, 1987, after a long illness.
