= Dewey Proctor =

American football player (1920–2009)

No. 73, 77, 72
- Positions: Fullback, linebacker

Personal information
- Born: July 1, 1920; Lake View, South Carolina, U.S.
- Died: July 2, 2009 (aged 89); Mullins, South Carolina
- Listed height: 5 ft 11 in (1.80 m)
- Listed weight: 215 lb (98 kg)

Career information
- High school: Lake View
- College: Furman (1939–1942)
- NFL draft: 1943: 3rd round, 21st overall pick

Career history
- New York Yankees (1946–1947); Chicago Rockets (1948); New York Yankees (1949)

Awards and highlights
- Second-team All-SoCon (1942)

Career AAFC statistics
- Rushing yards: 280
- Rushing average: 3.3
- Receptions: 6
- Receiving yards: 54
- Total touchdowns: 4
- Stats at Pro Football Reference

Dewey Michael Proctor (July 1, 1920 – July 2, 2009) was an American football fullback. A Triple-threat man who excelled on both offense and defense, he played college football at Furman (1939–1942), Great Lakes Navy (1943), Bainbridge Commodores (1944), and professional football in the All-America Football Conference with the New York Yankees (1946–1947, 1949) and Chicago Rockets (1948). He later served as police chief in Mullins, South Carolina, from 1961 to 1986.

== Early life ==
Proctor was born at Lake View, South Carolina in 1920 and attended Lake View High School. He was captain of Lake View's 1938 football team that won a state championship. He also played third base for the Lake View baseball team that won a state championship.

== College and military service ==
Proctor enrolled at Furman University in 1939 and played college football for Furman Paladins from 1939 to 1942. In 1940, he led the state in scoring with 52 points and was named to the all-state Team. In 1942, he was team captain and most valuable player, received all-state and all-Southern honors, played in the Blue-Gray Game and was voted most valuable player in the annual Carolinas Bowl.

Proctor served in the Navy during World War II. He played three seasons of football for the 1943 Great Lakes Navy Bluejackets football team that compiled a 10–2 record, defeated No. 1 Notre Dame, and was ranked No. 6 in the final AP poll. The following year, he played for the undefeated 1944 Bainbridge Commodores football team that compiled a 10–0 and was ranked No. 5 in the final AP poll. He concluded his Navy career playing for the Navy All-Stars in 1945.

== Professional football ==
Proctor was drafted in the third round by the New York Giants with the 21st pick in the 1943 NFL draft, but military service prevented him from playing. After the war, he played in the All-America Football Conference (AAFC) for the New York Yankees in 1946, 1947, and 1949 and for the Chicago Rockets in 1948. He appeared in 26 AAFC games, five of them as a starter. He tallied 280 rushing yards, 54 receiving yards, and four touchdowns. Proctor injured his knee in his first year in the AAFC, struggled with it for the remainder of his career, and finally underwent surgery.

== Later life ==
After his playing career ended, Proctor became the postmaster in his home town of Lake View. He later worked as a deputy with the Dillon County Sheriff's Department. In 1961, he was hired as police chief in Mullins, South Carolina, holding that post until 1986.

Proctor inducted into the Furman Athletic Hall of Fame in 1982. He was also inducted into the South Carolina Athletic Hall of Fame in 1984.

Furman died in 2009 in Mullins, South Carolina.
