= Joe Muha =

American football player and coach (1921–1993)

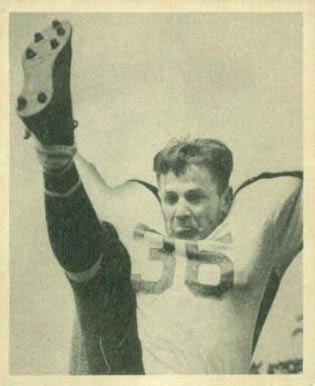
- Muha c. 1948

No. 36
- Positions: Fullback, linebacker, punter

Personal information
- Born: April 28, 1921; Central City, Pennsylvania, U.S.
- Died: March 31, 1993 (aged 71); Hemet, California, U.S.
- Listed height: 6 ft 1 in (1.85 m)
- Listed weight: 205 lb (93 kg)

Career information
- High school: Sto-Rox (McKees Rocks, Pennsylvania)
- College: VMI (1939–1942)
- NFL draft: 1943: 1st round, 2nd overall pick

Career history

Playing
- Philadelphia Eagles (1946–1950)

Coaching
- USC (1951–1952) Backfield coach; Chicago Cardinals (1954) Backfield coach

Awards and highlights
- As a player: 2× NFL champion (1948, 1949); Third-team All-American (1942); First-team All-SoCon (1942); Second-team All-SoCon (1941)

Career NFL statistics
- Rushing yards: 257
- Rushing average: 3.8
- Rushing touchdowns: 1
- Receiving touchdowns: 1
- Interceptions: 5
- Defensive touchdowns: 1
- Punting yards: 7,688
- Punting average: 42.9
- Stats at Pro Football Reference

Joseph George Muha (April 28, 1921 – March 31, 1993) was an American professional football player and coach who played as a fullback, linebacker and punter in the National Football League (NFL) for five seasons with the Philadelphia Eagles. He played college football for the VMI Keydets and was selected second overall by the Eagles of the 1943 NFL draft.

== Biography ==
Muha received his Bachelor of Science in Civil Engineering from the Virginia Military Institute, a Master of Arts in Economics from the University of Southern California and a Doctorate of Education from Nova Southwestern University in Florida.

Muha was the starting fullback for the Eagles for four years. He was also an umpire in the NFL from 1956 through 1971. He wore uniform number 43, which was claimed the season following Muha's retirement by Red Cashion.

Muha served as a second lieutenant in the United States Marine Corps from 1943 to 1947. He was inducted into the Virginia Sports Hall of Fame in 1976.
