= Ed Bradley (guard) =

American football player (1927–2009)

- Ed Bradley, 1948

No. 38, 67, 52, 59
- Positions: Guard, end, defensive end

Personal information
- Born: October 16, 1927; Bridgeport, Connecticut, U.S.
- Died: December 30, 2009 (aged 82); Stratford, Connecticut, U.S.
- Listed height: 6 ft 0 in (1.83 m)
- Listed weight: 212 lb (96 kg)

Career information
- High school: Warren Harding (Bridgeport)
- College: Wake Forest (1946–1949)
- NFL draft: 1950: 16th round, 206th overall pick

Career history
- Chicago Bears (1950, 1952); Montreal Alouettes (1953); Toronto Argonauts (1954)

Career NFL statistics
- Games played: 12
- Fumble recoveries: 1
- Stats at Pro Football Reference

Edward William Bradley II (October 16, 1927 – December 30, 2009) was an American professional football player who played at the guard, end, and defensive end positions. He was described in 1947 as "the greatest defensive end in Dixie."

A native of Bridgeport, Connecticut, he played college football for the Wake Forest Demon Deacons. He was selected by the Chicago Bears in the 16th round (206th overall pick) of the 1950 NFL draft. He played for the Bears during the 1950 and 1952 seasons and appeared in a total of 12 NFL games.

In July 1953, Bradley let the Bears, signing a contract to play for the Montreal Alouettes. He rejoined Peahead Walker who was his coach at Wake Forest and took over as Montreal's head coach in 1952. He played two seasons of Canadian football, spending the 1953 season with Montreal and the 1953 season with the Toronto Argonauts. He appeared in 25 games with Montreal and Toronto.

His son Ed Bradley Jr. also played football for Wake Forest and in the NFL.
