= Ed Bradley (linebacker) =

American football player (born 1950)

No. 38, 54
- Position: Linebacker

Personal information
- Born: April 22, 1950 (age 76); Bridgeport, Connecticut, U.S.
- Listed height: 6 ft 2 in (1.88 m)
- Listed weight: 239 lb (108 kg)

Career information
- High school: Stratford (Stratford, Connecticut)
- College: Wake Forest
- NFL draft: 1972: 4th round, 88th overall pick

Career history
- Pittsburgh Steelers (1972–1975); Seattle Seahawks (1976); San Francisco 49ers (1977–1978)

Awards and highlights
- 2× Super Bowl champion (IX, X)

Career NFL statistics
- Sacks: 1
- Fumble recoveries: 2
- Interceptions: 1
- Stats at Pro Football Reference

Edward William Bradley Jr. (born April 22, 1950) is an American former professional football player who played in seven National Football League (NFL) seasons from 1972-1978 for the Pittsburgh Steelers, the Seattle Seahawks and the San Francisco 49ers. He was drafted in the fourth round of the 1972 NFL Draft with the 88th overall pick by the Steelers. Since 1995, Bradley has served as the color commentator for Wake Forest University football radio broadcasts. Bradley's father, Ed Bradley, also played at Wake Forest and professionally for the Chicago Bears. Bradley was inducted into the Wake Forest Sports Hall of Fame in 1987.
