= Jack Freeman (American football) =

American football coach and administrator (1918–2003)

Biographical details
- Born: November 24, 1918; Windber, Pennsylvania, U.S.
- Died: May 29, 2003 (aged 84); Lexington, Virginia, U.S.

Playing career

Football
- 1940: Notre Dame
- 1941–1942: William & Mary
- 1946: William & Mary

Basketball
- 1941–1943: William & Mary
- Position: Halfback (football)

Coaching career (HC unless noted)

Football
- 1947–1948: McKeesport HS (PA)
- 1949–1950: Williamsport HS (PA)
- 1951: William & Mary (backfield)
- 1952–1956: William & Mary

Administrative career (AD unless noted)
- 1952–1957: William & Mary

Head coaching record
- Overall: 14–29–5 (college)

John Joseph Freeman (November 24, 1918 – May 29, 2003) was an American football coach and college athletic administrator. He served as the head football coach at the College of William & Mary's from 1952 to 1956, compiling a record of 14–29–5. Freeman was also the athletic director at William & Mary from 1952 to 1957.

Freeman played college footballfootball and basketball and ran track at William & Mary in the 1940s. He died on May 29, 2003, in Lexington, Virginia.

== Head coaching record ==
=== College ===
Year	Team	Overall	Conference	Standing	Bowl/playoffs
William & Mary Indians (Southern Conference) (1952–1956)
1952	William & Mary	4–5	4–1	4th	
1953	William & Mary	5–4–1	3–2	4th	
1954	William & Mary	4–4–2	1–2–2	T–6th	
1955	William & Mary	1–7–1	1–3–1	7–th	
1956	William & Mary	0–9–1	0–5	10th	
William & Mary:		14–29–5	9–13–3		
Total:		14–29–5			
