= Bosh Pritchard =

American football player (1919–1996)

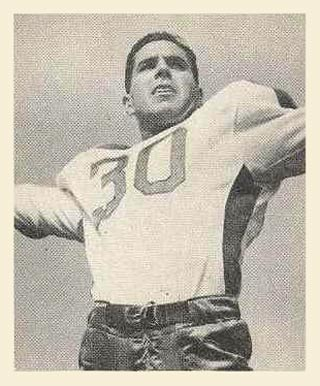
- Pritchard on a 1948 Bowman football card

No. 56, 40, 30, 35
- Position: Halfback

Personal information
- Born: September 10, 1919; Windsor, North Carolina, U.S.
- Died: November 7, 1996 (aged 77); North Fort Myers, Florida, U.S.
- Listed height: 5 ft 11 in (1.80 m)
- Listed weight: 164 lb (74 kg)

Career information
- High school: Hopewell (Hopewell, Virginia)
- College: VMI (1938–1941); Georgia Tech (1943)
- NFL draft: 1942: undrafted

Career history
- Cleveland Rams (1942); Philadelphia Eagles (1942–1951); New York Giants (1951)

Awards and highlights
- 2× NFL champion (1948, 1949); Pro Bowl (1942); Second-team All-SoCon (1941)

Career NFL statistics
- Rushing yards: 1,730
- Rushing average: 4.4
- Receptions: 75
- Receiving yards: 1,168
- Total touchdowns: 25
- Stats at Pro Football Reference

Abisha Collins "Bosh" Pritchard (September 10, 1919 – November 7, 1996) was an American professional football halfback in the National Football League (NFL) who played for ten seasons for the Cleveland Rams, the Philadelphia Eagles and the New York Giants. He appeared in 60 NFL games, scored 25 touchdowns, and compiled 1,730 rushing yards, 1,168 receiving yards, 1,072 punt return yards, and 938 kickoff return yards. He led the NFL in 1949 with an average of 6.0 yards per rushing carry and in 1946 with an average of 11.3 yards per touch. He also led the NFL in 1948 with five fumble recoveries. He attended Georgia Tech and the Virginia Military Institute.

Pritchard served as a commentator on Eagles television broadcasts for CBS in the late 1950s and early 1960s.

He was inducted into the Virginia Sports Hall of Fame in 1997.

== See also ==
- List of NCAA major college football yearly punt and kickoff return leaders
