= Richmond Rebels (American Football League) =

Professional American football team

The Richmond Rebels were an American football team based in Richmond, Virginia that played in the Dixie League in 1946 and the American Football League from 1947 to 1950. The squad played in the playoffs from 1948 to 1950. It won the league championship in 1949 and 1950, the league's final season. They were an affiliate of the Chicago Bears from 1948–1950.

In October 1947, the franchise of the Long Island Indians was sold to the Richmond Rebels.

Another team by that name played in the Virginia-Carolina Football League in 1937.
