= 1941 All-Southern Conference football team =

College football season

The 1941 All-Southern Conference football team consists of American football players chosen by the Associated Press (AP) and United Press (UP) for the All-Southern Conference football team for the 1941 college football season.

The 1941 Duke Blue Devils football team won the Southern Conference championship, was ranked No. 2 in the final AP Poll, and placed four players on the first team: back Steve Lach (AP-1, UP-1), end Bob Gantt (AP-1, UP-2); tackle Mike Karmazin (AP-1, UP-1); and center Bob Barnett (AP-1, UP-1).

== All-Southern Conference selections ==
=== Backs ===
- Steve Lach, Duke (AP-1, UP-1) (College Football Hall of Fame)
- Harvey Johnson, William & Mary (AP-1, UP-1)
- Charlie Timmons, Clemson (AP-1, UP-1)
- Stan Stasica, South Carolina (AP-1, UP-1)
- Bosh Pritchard, VMI (AP-2, UP-2)
- Joe Muha, VMI (AP-2, UP-2)
- Tommy Prothro, Duke (AP-3, UP-2)
- Booty Payne, Clemson (AP-2)
- Winston Siegfried, Duke (AP-2)
- John Polanski, Wake Forest (UP-2)
- David Monroe Spencer, Davidson (AP-3)
- Harry Dunkle, North Carolina (AP-3)
- Dewey Proctor, Furman (AP-3)

=== Ends ===
- Joe Blalock, Clemson (AP-1, UP-1)
- Bob Gantt, Duke (AP-1, UP-2)
- Glenn Knox, William & Mary (AP-2, UP-1)
- Al Piasecky, Duke (AP-2, UP-2)
- Cline, Wake Forest (AP-3)
- Stan Nowak, South Carolina (AP-3)

=== Tackles ===
- Mike Karmazin, Duke (AP-1, UP-1)
- George Fritts, Clemson (AP-1, UP-1) (College Football Hall of Fame)
- Marvin Bass, William & Mary (AP-2, UP-2)
- Dick Steck, North Carolina (AP-2, UP-2)
- Ralph Burlin, Maryland (AP-3)
- Pat Preston, Wake Forest (AP-3)

=== Guards ===
- Buster Ramsey, William & Mary (AP-1, UP-1)
- Carl Givler, Wake Forest (AP-1, UP-1)
- Roger McClure, Virginia Tech (AP-2, UP-2)
- Frank Kapriva, Wake Forest (AP-3, UP-2)
- Wade Padgett, Clemson (AP-2)
- John Goddard, Duke (AP-3)

=== Centers ===
- Bob Barnett, Duke (AP-1, UP-1)
- Lou Sossamon, South Carolina (AP-2, UP-2)
- Carl Suntheimer, North Carolina (AP-3)

== Key ==
AP = Associated Press, selected by the region's sports writers and coaches

UP = United Press, based on a poll of coaches and sports writers in the Southern Conference area

== See also ==
- 1941 College Football All-America Team
