= Bucko Kilroy =

American football player, executive and administrator (1921–2007)

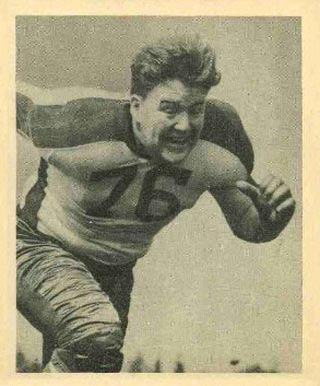
- Kilroy c. 1948

No. 76
- Positions: Guard; Tackle

Personal information
- Born: May 30, 1921; Philadelphia, Pennsylvania, U.S.
- Died: July 10, 2007 (aged 86); Norwood, Massachusetts, U.S.
- Listed height: 6 ft 2 in (1.88 m)
- Listed weight: 243 lb (110 kg)

Career information
- High school: Northeast Catholic (Philadelphia)
- College: Notre Dame; Temple (1939-1941)
- NFL draft: 1943: undrafted

Career history

Playing
- Steagles (1943); Philadelphia Eagles (1944–1955)

Coaching
- Philadelphia Eagles (1956–1959) Assistant coach

Operations
- Philadelphia Eagles (1960–1961) Scout; Washington Redskins (1962–1964) Scout; Dallas Cowboys (1965–1970) Scout; New England Patriots (1971–1978) Director of Player personnel; New England Patriots (1979–1982) General manager; New England Patriots (1983–1993) Vice president; New England Patriots (1994–2006) Scout consultant

Awards and highlights
- As a player: 2× NFL champion (1948, 1949); 3× Second-team All-Pro (1949, 1953, 1954); 3× Pro Bowl (1953–1955); Philadelphia Eagles Hall of Fame; NFL 1940s All-Decade Team; As an executive: 3× Super Bowl champion (XXXVI, XXXVIII, XXXIX); NFL champion (1960)

Career NFL statistics
- Games played: 134
- Games started: 103
- Fumble recoveries: 11
- Stats at Pro Football Reference
- Executive profile at Pro Football Reference

Francis Joseph Kilroy (May 30, 1921 – July 10, 2007), nicknamed "Bucko", was an American football player, executive and administrator. He played for the Philadelphia Eagles of the National Football League (NFL) for 13 seasons.

== Early life ==
Kilroy was born in the Port Richmond section of Philadelphia, where he attended St. Anne's grade school before attending Northeast Catholic High School and then Temple University. As a Junior at Northeast Catholic, he played on the 1937 Falcons championship team.

== College career ==
Kilroy was originally recruited by the Notre Dame Fighting Irish, but went on to become one of the finest linemen in Temple Owls football history. He starred for the Owls in the 1940 and 1941 seasons. He helped them to defeat rivals Penn State, Bucknell and Villanova in the 1941 season for the first and only time in school history. He played both offense and defense and started every game in 1941 en route to becoming the first Temple football player to receive honorable mention All-American honors. In 1942 and part of 1943 he served in the merchant marines during the World War II.

== Professional career ==
Kilroy was signed by the Philadelphia Eagles as an undrafted free agent in 1943. He played both offensive and defensive line in the National Football League (NFL) for 13 seasons, all with the Eagles. He also was often called one of the toughest, if not the dirtiest, player of that era. Despite that reputation he won two NFL championships in the 1948 and 1949 seasons. He was a Pro Bowl selection 3 times during his career, missing only one of 203 games because of an injury. He also played in 147 consecutive games, which was a league record at the time.

A two-way line starter for championship teams in 1948 and 1949 and for runners-up in 1947, Bucko helped Steve Van Buren win several NFL rushing titles in that time span. He also had 5 career interceptions on defense.

Hall of Famer defensive tackle Art Donovan had this to say about him: "The beginnings of the Colt-Eagle rivalry probably had something to do with a guy named Frank Kilroy. They called him Bad News Kilroy, and he was. The dirty bastard was a legend by the time I got into the league. It was the first thing they warned a rookie: 'Watch out for the Irish bum'. He was really pretty unbelievable. He took kickoffs literally. He'd run downfield kicking people, just kicking them out of bounds. And he never got called for it. The officials would just let him do it".

== After playing career ==
After retiring from football as a player, Kilroy became an assistant coach with the Eagles from 1955 to 1959. He then went on to work as a scout for the Washington Redskins and the Dallas Cowboys. He was instrumental in selecting Roger Staubach in 1969 despite his military service. Kilroy was also credited as a founder of the modern day NFL draft and as an NFL executive he helped fashion the Super Bowl as we know it today. He later became the general manager of the New England Patriots in 1971; during his tenure, they went to their first Super Bowl in Super Bowl XX, in 1985. As the head of scouting in early 2000s, Bucko was instrumental in drafting many of players that won three Super Bowls for the Patriots.

== Executive career ==
- Scout for the Philadelphia Eagles, from 1960 to 1961.
- Scout for the Washington Redskins, from 1962 to 1964.
- Scout for the Dallas Cowboys, from 1965 to 1970.
- Director of Player Personnel for the New England Patriots, from 1971 to 1978.
- General manager for the Patriots, from 1979 to 1982.
- Vice president for the Patriots, from 1983 to 1993.
- Scout consultant for the Patriots, from 1994 to 2006.

== Honors ==
Kilroy was inducted into the North Catholic High School Hall of Fame, the Temple University Athletics Hall of Fame and the Philadelphia Sports Hall of Fame. He was also named to the National Football League 1940s All-Decade Team.

In 2022, the Professional Football Researchers Association named Kilroy to the PFRA Hall of Very Good Class of 2022. In 2025, the Philadelphia Eagles inducted Kilroy to the Eagles Hall of Fame.

== Death ==
Bucko Kilroy died in Norwood, Massachusetts, on July 10, 2007, at the age of 86.
