= 1941 Carnegie Tech Tartans football team =

American college football season

1941 Carnegie Tech Tartans football
- Conference: Independent
- Record: 1–7
- Head coach: Edward Baker (2nd season)
- Home stadium: Pitt Stadium

1941 Eastern college football independents records
| | Conf. | | | Overall |
| Team | W | L | T | W | | L | | T |
|---|---|---|---|---|---|---|---|---|
| No. 8 Duquesne | | – | | 8 | – | 0 | – | 0 |
| Thiel | | – | | 7 | – | 0 | – | 0 |
| Saint Francis (PA) | | – | | 6 | – | 0 | – | 1 |
| No. 6 Fordham | | – | | 8 | – | 1 | – | 0 |
| Rochester | | – | | 6 | – | 1 | – | 0 |
| Trinity (CT) | | – | | 6 | – | 1 | – | 0 |
| Wagner | | – | | 5 | – | 1 | – | 0 |
| Franklin & Marshall | | – | | 5 | – | 1 | – | 1 |
| Penn State | | – | | 7 | – | 2 | – | 0 |
| Temple | | – | | 7 | – | 2 | – | 0 |
| Coast Guard | | – | | 6 | – | 2 | – | 0 |
| Norwich | | – | | 6 | – | 2 | – | 0 |
| Hofstra | | – | | 5 | – | 2 | – | 0 |
| Boston College | | – | | 7 | – | 3 | – | 0 |
| Syracuse | | – | | 5 | – | 2 | – | 1 |
| Bucknell | | – | | 6 | – | 3 | – | 0 |
| Drexel | | – | | 4 | – | 2 | – | 1 |
| Boston University | | – | | 5 | – | 3 | – | 0 |
| La Salle | | – | | 5 | – | 3 | – | 0 |
| Tufts | | – | | 5 | – | 3 | – | 0 |
| Army | | – | | 5 | – | 3 | – | 1 |
| CCNY | | – | | 4 | – | 4 | – | 0 |
| Villanova | | – | | 4 | – | 4 | – | 0 |
| Manhattan | | – | | 4 | – | 4 | – | 1 |
| Holy Cross | | – | | 4 | – | 4 | – | 2 |
| Colgate | | – | | 3 | – | 3 | – | 2 |
| Providence | | – | | 3 | – | 3 | – | 2 |
| Buffalo | | – | | 3 | – | 4 | – | 1 |
| Massachusetts State | | – | | 3 | – | 4 | – | 1 |
| Pittsburgh | | – | | 3 | – | 6 | – | 0 |
| Vermont | | – | | 2 | – | 6 | – | 0 |
| NYU | | – | | 2 | – | 7 | – | 0 |
| Carnegie Tech | | – | | 1 | – | 7 | – | 0 |
Rankings from AP Poll

The 1941 Carnegie Tech Tartans football team was an American football team that represented the Carnegie Institute of Technology—now known as Carnegie Mellon University—as an independent during the 1941 college football season. In Edward Baker's second year as head coach, the Tartans compiled a 1–7 record, concurrent with their recent de-emphasis of football, and were outscored 148 to 37, including no points in their final three contests.

== Schedule ==
| Date | Opponent | Site | Result | Attendance | Source |
|---|---|---|---|---|---|
| September | Westminster (PA) | Pitt Stadium; Pittsburgh, PA | L 13–19 | 7,000 | |
| October 4 | Albright | Reading, PA | W 12–0 | 5,000 | |
| October 11 | at Muhlenberg | Allentown, PA | L 6–26 | | |
| October 18 | No. 8 Notre Dame | Pitt Stadium; Pittsburgh, PA | L 0–16 | 27,719 | |
| October 25 | at Geneva | Beaver Falls, PA | L 6–13 | 5,000 | |
| November 1 | at Case | Shaw Stadium; East Cleveland, OH | L 0–27 | | |
| November 8 | at Cincinnati | Nippert Stadium; Cincinnati, OH | L 0–20 | | |
| November 29 | Pittsburgh | Pitt Stadium; Pittsburgh, PA | L 0–27 | 19,000 | |
Rankings from AP Poll released prior to the game
