= 1941 Buffalo Bulls football team =

American college football season

1941 Buffalo Bulls football
- Conference: Independent
- Record: 3–4–1
- Head coach: Jim Peele (6th season)
- Captain: Vic Manz
- Home stadium: Rotary Field

1941 Eastern college football independents records
	Conf.			Overall
Team	W	L	T	W		L		T
No. 8 Duquesne		–		8	–	0	–	0
Thiel		–		7	–	0	–	0
Saint Francis (PA)		–		6	–	0	–	1
No. 6 Fordham		–		8	–	1	–	0
Rochester		–		6	–	1	–	0
Trinity (CT)		–		6	–	1	–	0
Wagner		–		5	–	1	–	0
Franklin & Marshall		–		5	–	1	–	1
Penn State		–		7	–	2	–	0
Temple		–		7	–	2	–	0
Coast Guard		–		6	–	2	–	0
Norwich		–		6	–	2	–	0
Hofstra		–		5	–	2	–	0
Boston College		–		7	–	3	–	0
Syracuse		–		5	–	2	–	1
Bucknell		–		6	–	3	–	0
Drexel		–		4	–	2	–	1
Boston University		–		5	–	3	–	0
La Salle		–		5	–	3	–	0
Tufts		–		5	–	3	–	0
Army		–		5	–	3	–	1
CCNY		–		4	–	4	–	0
Villanova		–		4	–	4	–	0
Manhattan		–		4	–	4	–	1
Holy Cross		–		4	–	4	–	2
Colgate		–		3	–	3	–	2
Providence		–		3	–	3	–	2
Buffalo		–		3	–	4	–	1
Massachusetts State		–		3	–	4	–	1
Pittsburgh		–		3	–	6	–	0
Vermont		–		2	–	6	–	0
NYU		–		2	–	7	–	0
Carnegie Tech		–		1	–	7	–	0
Rankings from AP Poll

The 1941 Buffalo Bulls football team was an American football team that represented the University of Buffalo as an independent during the 1941 college football season. In their sixth season under head coach Jim Peele, the Bulls compiled a 3–4–1 record. The team played its home games at Rotary Field in Buffalo, New York.

== Schedule ==
Date	Opponent	Site	Result	Attendance	Source
September 27	Susquehanna	Rotary Field; Buffalo, NY	W 19–0		
October 4	at CCNY	Lewisohn Stadium; New York, NY	W 6–0		
October 11	at Drexel	Drexel Field; Philadelphia, PA	L 6–19	3,000	
October 18	Washington & Jefferson	Rotary Field; Buffalo, NY	L 6–14		
October 25	at Alfred	Alfred, NY	L 0–14		
November 1	Lehigh	Rotary Field; Buffalo, NY	T 0–0		
November 8	at Hobart	Geneva, NY	W 12–7		
November 15	RPI	Rotary Field; Buffalo, NY	L 6–21		
