= 1941 Vermont Catamounts football team =

American college football season

1941 Vermont Catamounts football
- Conference: Independent
- Record: 2–6
- Head coach: John C. Evans (2nd season)
- Home stadium: Centennial Field

1941 Eastern college football independents records
	Conf.			Overall
Team	W	L	T	W		L		T
No. 8 Duquesne		–		8	–	0	–	0
Thiel		–		7	–	0	–	0
Saint Francis (PA)		–		6	–	0	–	1
No. 6 Fordham		–		8	–	1	–	0
Rochester		–		6	–	1	–	0
Trinity (CT)		–		6	–	1	–	0
Wagner		–		5	–	1	–	0
Franklin & Marshall		–		5	–	1	–	1
Penn State		–		7	–	2	–	0
Temple		–		7	–	2	–	0
Coast Guard		–		6	–	2	–	0
Norwich		–		6	–	2	–	0
Hofstra		–		5	–	2	–	0
Boston College		–		7	–	3	–	0
Syracuse		–		5	–	2	–	1
Bucknell		–		6	–	3	–	0
Drexel		–		4	–	2	–	1
Boston University		–		5	–	3	–	0
La Salle		–		5	–	3	–	0
Tufts		–		5	–	3	–	0
Army		–		5	–	3	–	1
CCNY		–		4	–	4	–	0
Villanova		–		4	–	4	–	0
Manhattan		–		4	–	4	–	1
Holy Cross		–		4	–	4	–	2
Colgate		–		3	–	3	–	2
Providence		–		3	–	3	–	2
Buffalo		–		3	–	4	–	1
Massachusetts State		–		3	–	4	–	1
Pittsburgh		–		3	–	6	–	0
Vermont		–		2	–	6	–	0
NYU		–		2	–	7	–	0
Carnegie Tech		–		1	–	7	–	0
Rankings from AP Poll

The 1941 Vermont Catamounts football team was an American football team that represented the University of Vermont as an independent during the 1941 college football season. In their second year under head coach John C. Evans, the team compiled a 2–6 record. The Catamounts also defeated the Montreal Bulldogs 28–13 in an exhibition game played at Percival Molson Memorial Stadium in Montreal on October 15.

== Schedule ==
Date	Opponent	Site	Result	Attendance	Source
September 27	at Northeastern	Huntington Field; Brookline, MA	L 6–20		
October 4	Trinity (CT)^{†}	Centennial Field; Burlington, VT	L 7–9	3,000	
October 11	at Colby	Seaverns Field; Waterville, ME	L 0–13		
October 18	Union (NY)	Centennial Field; Burlington, VT	L 6–7	3,000	
October 25	at New Hampshire	Lewis Field; Durham, NH	L 18–40		
November 1	RPI	Centennial Field; Burlington, VT	W 16–0		
November 8	at Norwich	Sabine Field; Northfield, VT	L 0–59		
November 15	Middlebury	Centennial Field; Burlington, VT	W 7–6	4,500	
^{†}Homecoming
