= 1941 La Salle Explorers football team =

American college football season

1941 La Salle Explorers football
- Conference: Independent
- Record: 5–3
- Head coach: Jim Henry (2nd season)
- Home stadium: McCarthy Stadium

1941 Eastern college football independents records
	Conf.			Overall
Team	W	L	T	W		L		T
No. 8 Duquesne		–		8	–	0	–	0
Thiel		–		7	–	0	–	0
Saint Francis (PA)		–		6	–	0	–	1
No. 6 Fordham		–		8	–	1	–	0
Rochester		–		6	–	1	–	0
Trinity (CT)		–		6	–	1	–	0
Wagner		–		5	–	1	–	0
Franklin & Marshall		–		5	–	1	–	1
Penn State		–		7	–	2	–	0
Temple		–		7	–	2	–	0
Coast Guard		–		6	–	2	–	0
Norwich		–		6	–	2	–	0
Hofstra		–		5	–	2	–	0
Boston College		–		7	–	3	–	0
Syracuse		–		5	–	2	–	1
Bucknell		–		6	–	3	–	0
Drexel		–		4	–	2	–	1
Boston University		–		5	–	3	–	0
La Salle		–		5	–	3	–	0
Tufts		–		5	–	3	–	0
Army		–		5	–	3	–	1
CCNY		–		4	–	4	–	0
Villanova		–		4	–	4	–	0
Manhattan		–		4	–	4	–	1
Holy Cross		–		4	–	4	–	2
Colgate		–		3	–	3	–	2
Providence		–		3	–	3	–	2
Buffalo		–		3	–	4	–	1
Massachusetts State		–		3	–	4	–	1
Pittsburgh		–		3	–	6	–	0
Vermont		–		2	–	6	–	0
NYU		–		2	–	7	–	0
Carnegie Tech		–		1	–	7	–	0
Rankings from AP Poll

The 1941 La Salle Explorers football team was an American football team that represented La Salle College (now known as La Salle University) as an independent during the 1941 college football season. In their second year under head coach Jim Henry, the Explorers compiled a 5–3 record and outscored opponents by a total of 119 to 55.

The team played its home games at McCarthy Stadium in Philadelphia.

== Schedule ==
Date	Opponent	Site	Result	Attendance	Source
October 4	Blue Ridge College	McCarthy Stadium; Philadelphia, PA	W 26–6		
October 12	Niagara	McCarthy Stadium; Philadelphia, PA	W 21–0	6,000	
October 19	Mount St. Mary's	McCarthy Stadium; Philadelphia, PA	L 6–7		
October 26	at Canisius	Civic Stadium; Buffalo, NY	W 7–0	11,500	
November 1	at Saint Anselm	Manchester, NH	W 21–0		
November 9	Scranton	McCarthy Stadium; Philadelphia, PA	L 19–20		
November 16	Providence	McCarthy Stadium; Philadelphia, PA	L 7–20		
November 22	at Pennsylvania Military College	Chester, PA	W 12–2		
