= 1941 CCNY Beavers football team =

American college football season

1941 CCNY Beavers football
- Conference: Independent
- Record: 4–4
- Head coach: Benny Friedman (8th season)
- Home stadium: Lewisohn Stadium

1941 Eastern college football independents records
	Conf.			Overall
Team	W	L	T	W		L		T
No. 8 Duquesne		–		8	–	0	–	0
Thiel		–		7	–	0	–	0
Saint Francis (PA)		–		6	–	0	–	1
No. 6 Fordham		–		8	–	1	–	0
Rochester		–		6	–	1	–	0
Trinity (CT)		–		6	–	1	–	0
Wagner		–		5	–	1	–	0
Franklin & Marshall		–		5	–	1	–	1
Penn State		–		7	–	2	–	0
Temple		–		7	–	2	–	0
Coast Guard		–		6	–	2	–	0
Norwich		–		6	–	2	–	0
Hofstra		–		5	–	2	–	0
Boston College		–		7	–	3	–	0
Syracuse		–		5	–	2	–	1
Bucknell		–		6	–	3	–	0
Drexel		–		4	–	2	–	1
Boston University		–		5	–	3	–	0
La Salle		–		5	–	3	–	0
Tufts		–		5	–	3	–	0
Army		–		5	–	3	–	1
CCNY		–		4	–	4	–	0
Villanova		–		4	–	4	–	0
Manhattan		–		4	–	4	–	1
Holy Cross		–		4	–	4	–	2
Colgate		–		3	–	3	–	2
Providence		–		3	–	3	–	2
Buffalo		–		3	–	4	–	1
Massachusetts State		–		3	–	4	–	1
Pittsburgh		–		3	–	6	–	0
Vermont		–		2	–	6	–	0
NYU		–		2	–	7	–	0
Carnegie Tech		–		1	–	7	–	0
Rankings from AP Poll

The 1941 CCNY Beavers football team was an American football team that represented the City College of New York (CCNY) as an independent during the 1941 college football season. In their eighth season under head coach Benny Friedman, the team compiled a 4–4 record.

== Schedule ==
Date	Opponent	Site	Result	Attendance	Source
September 27	at Colby	Seaverns Field; Waterville, ME	W 20–16		
October 4	Buffalo	Lewisohn Stadium; New York, NY	L 0–6		
October 11	at Lebanon Valley	Hershey Stadium; Hershey, PA	L 7–30		
October 18	Clarkson	Lewisohn Stadium; New York, NY	L 0–20	1,800	
October 25	at Susquehanna	Selinsgrove, PA	W 7–6		
November 1	Hobart	Lewisohn Stadium; New York, NY	W 6–0	900	
November 7	at Moravian	Moravian Field; Bethlehem, PA	L 0–26	4,000	
November 15	Brooklyn	Lewisohn Stadium; New York, NY	W 43–13	5,000	
