= 1941 Massachusetts State Aggies football team =

American college football season

1941 Massachusetts State Aggies football
- Conference: Independent
- Record: 3–4–1
- Head coach: Walter Hargesheimer (1st season)
- Home stadium: Alumni Field

1941 Eastern college football independents records
	Conf.			Overall
Team	W	L	T	W		L		T
No. 8 Duquesne		–		8	–	0	–	0
Thiel		–		7	–	0	–	0
Saint Francis (PA)		–		6	–	0	–	1
No. 6 Fordham		–		8	–	1	–	0
Rochester		–		6	–	1	–	0
Trinity (CT)		–		6	–	1	–	0
Wagner		–		5	–	1	–	0
Franklin & Marshall		–		5	–	1	–	1
Penn State		–		7	–	2	–	0
Temple		–		7	–	2	–	0
Coast Guard		–		6	–	2	–	0
Norwich		–		6	–	2	–	0
Hofstra		–		5	–	2	–	0
Boston College		–		7	–	3	–	0
Syracuse		–		5	–	2	–	1
Bucknell		–		6	–	3	–	0
Drexel		–		4	–	2	–	1
Boston University		–		5	–	3	–	0
La Salle		–		5	–	3	–	0
Tufts		–		5	–	3	–	0
Army		–		5	–	3	–	1
CCNY		–		4	–	4	–	0
Villanova		–		4	–	4	–	0
Manhattan		–		4	–	4	–	1
Holy Cross		–		4	–	4	–	2
Colgate		–		3	–	3	–	2
Providence		–		3	–	3	–	2
Buffalo		–		3	–	4	–	1
Massachusetts State		–		3	–	4	–	1
Pittsburgh		–		3	–	6	–	0
Vermont		–		2	–	6	–	0
NYU		–		2	–	7	–	0
Carnegie Tech		–		1	–	7	–	0
Rankings from AP Poll

The 1941 Massachusetts State Aggies football team was an American football team that represented Massachusetts State College as an independent during the 1941 college football season. In their first season under head coach Walter Hargesheimer, the Aggies compiled a 3–4–1 record. They played their home games at Alumni Field in Amherst, Massachusetts.

== Schedule ==
Date	Opponent	Site	Result	Source
September 27	at Springfield	Pratt Field; Springfield, MA	T 7–7	
October 4	Connecticut	Alumni Field; Amherst, MA (rivalry)	W 8–6	
October 11	Norwich	Alumni Field; Amherst, MA	L 0–20	
October 18	at Rhode Island State	Meade Stadium; Kingston, RI	L 6–34	
October 25	at Worcester Tech	Alumni Field; Worcester, MA	W 32–0	
November 1	Amherst	Alumni Field; Amherst, MA	L 0–20	
November 8	at Brooklyn	Brooklyn, NY	W 33–19	
November 15	Tufts	Alumni Field; Amherst, MA	L 7–14	
