= 1941 Drexel Dragons football team =

American college football season

1941 Drexel Dragons football
- Conference: Independent
- Record: 4–2–1
- Head coach: Walter Halas (15th season)
- Captain: Wills Burrowes
- Home stadium: Drexel field

1941 Eastern college football independents records
| | Conf. | | | Overall |
| Team | W | L | T | W | | L | | T |
|---|---|---|---|---|---|---|---|---|
| No. 8 Duquesne | | – | | 8 | – | 0 | – | 0 |
| Thiel | | – | | 7 | – | 0 | – | 0 |
| Saint Francis (PA) | | – | | 6 | – | 0 | – | 1 |
| No. 6 Fordham | | – | | 8 | – | 1 | – | 0 |
| Rochester | | – | | 6 | – | 1 | – | 0 |
| Trinity (CT) | | – | | 6 | – | 1 | – | 0 |
| Wagner | | – | | 5 | – | 1 | – | 0 |
| Franklin & Marshall | | – | | 5 | – | 1 | – | 1 |
| Penn State | | – | | 7 | – | 2 | – | 0 |
| Temple | | – | | 7 | – | 2 | – | 0 |
| Coast Guard | | – | | 6 | – | 2 | – | 0 |
| Norwich | | – | | 6 | – | 2 | – | 0 |
| Hofstra | | – | | 5 | – | 2 | – | 0 |
| Boston College | | – | | 7 | – | 3 | – | 0 |
| Syracuse | | – | | 5 | – | 2 | – | 1 |
| Bucknell | | – | | 6 | – | 3 | – | 0 |
| Drexel | | – | | 4 | – | 2 | – | 1 |
| Boston University | | – | | 5 | – | 3 | – | 0 |
| La Salle | | – | | 5 | – | 3 | – | 0 |
| Tufts | | – | | 5 | – | 3 | – | 0 |
| Army | | – | | 5 | – | 3 | – | 1 |
| CCNY | | – | | 4 | – | 4 | – | 0 |
| Villanova | | – | | 4 | – | 4 | – | 0 |
| Manhattan | | – | | 4 | – | 4 | – | 1 |
| Holy Cross | | – | | 4 | – | 4 | – | 2 |
| Colgate | | – | | 3 | – | 3 | – | 2 |
| Providence | | – | | 3 | – | 3 | – | 2 |
| Buffalo | | – | | 3 | – | 4 | – | 1 |
| Massachusetts State | | – | | 3 | – | 4 | – | 1 |
| Pittsburgh | | – | | 3 | – | 6 | – | 0 |
| Vermont | | – | | 2 | – | 6 | – | 0 |
| NYU | | – | | 2 | – | 7 | – | 0 |
| Carnegie Tech | | – | | 1 | – | 7 | – | 0 |
Rankings from AP Poll

1941 Drexel Dragons football team was an American football team that represented Drexel Institute of Technology (later renamed Drexel University) as an independent during the 1941 college football season. In their 15th and final season under head coach Walter Halas (brother of George Halas, the Dragons compiled a 4–2–1 record.

== Schedule ==
| Date | Time | Opponent | Site | Result | Attendance | Source |
|---|---|---|---|---|---|---|
| September 27 | | at RPI | Troy, NY | L 0–21 | | |
| October 4 | | Juniata | | Cancelled | | |
| October 11 | | Buffalo | Drexel field; Philadelphia, PA | W 19–6 | 3,000 | |
| October 18 | | Swarthmore | Philadelphia, PA | Postponed | | |
| October 25 | | Ursinus^{†} | Drexel field; Philadelphia, PA | W 14–7 | 5,000 | |
| November 1 | | at Dickinson | Biddle Field; Carlisle, PA | T 0–0 | 1,000 | |
| November 8 | | Susquehanna | Drexel field; Philadelphia, PA | W 12–8 | 3,000 | |
| November 15 | 2:00 pm | Delaware | Drexel field; Philadelphia, PA | L 6–7 | 4,500 | |
| November 22 | | Swarthmore | Drexel field; Philadelphia, PA | W 7–0 | 3,000 | |
^{†}Homecoming; All times are in Eastern time

== Roster ==
1941 Drexel Dragons football team roster
| Players | | | Coaches |
|---|---|---|---|
| Offense: Pos. / # / Name / Class; OT / 16 / Wills Burrowes (C) | Defense: Pos. / # / Name / Class | Special teams: Pos. / # / Name / Class | Head coach: Walter Halas (Illinois); Coordinators/assistant coaches: Maury McMains (McDaniel); Albert H. Repscha (Maine); Legend: (C) Team captain; (S) Suspended; (I) Ineligible; Injured; Redshirt |
