= 1941 NYU Violets football team =

American college football season

1941 NYU Violets football
- Conference: Independent
- Record: 2–7
- Head coach: Mal Stevens (8th season)
- Home stadium: Yankee Stadium; Polo Grounds; Ohio Field

1941 Eastern college football independents records
	Conf.			Overall
Team	W	L	T	W		L		T
No. 8 Duquesne		–		8	–	0	–	0
Thiel		–		7	–	0	–	0
Saint Francis (PA)		–		6	–	0	–	1
No. 6 Fordham		–		8	–	1	–	0
Rochester		–		6	–	1	–	0
Trinity (CT)		–		6	–	1	–	0
Wagner		–		5	–	1	–	0
Franklin & Marshall		–		5	–	1	–	1
Penn State		–		7	–	2	–	0
Temple		–		7	–	2	–	0
Coast Guard		–		6	–	2	–	0
Norwich		–		6	–	2	–	0
Hofstra		–		5	–	2	–	0
Boston College		–		7	–	3	–	0
Syracuse		–		5	–	2	–	1
Bucknell		–		6	–	3	–	0
Drexel		–		4	–	2	–	1
Boston University		–		5	–	3	–	0
La Salle		–		5	–	3	–	0
Tufts		–		5	–	3	–	0
Army		–		5	–	3	–	1
CCNY		–		4	–	4	–	0
Villanova		–		4	–	4	–	0
Manhattan		–		4	–	4	–	1
Holy Cross		–		4	–	4	–	2
Colgate		–		3	–	3	–	2
Providence		–		3	–	3	–	2
Buffalo		–		3	–	4	–	1
Massachusetts State		–		3	–	4	–	1
Pittsburgh		–		3	–	6	–	0
Vermont		–		2	–	6	–	0
NYU		–		2	–	7	–	0
Carnegie Tech		–		1	–	7	–	0
Rankings from AP Poll

The 1941 NYU Violets football team was an American football team that represented New York University as an independent during the 1941 college football season. In their 68th season of intercollegiate football, and their eighth and final season under head coach Mal Stevens, the Violets compiled a 2–7 record and were outscored by a total of 243 to 47. Prior to the season, Stevens called the team "the best conditioned squad in years". The Violets began the season with two wins, then lost the final seven games, including shutout losses against Syracuse, Penn State, Big 6 champion Missouri, and Tulane, and fell by a 49–7 score to a Texas A&M team that won the Southwest Conference championship.

NYU was ranked at No. 126 (out of 681 teams) in the final rankings under the Litkenhous Difference by Score System for 1941.

The team played its home games at the Polo Grounds in Upper Manhattan, and Ohio Field and Yankee Stadium in The Bronx.

== Schedule ==
Date	Opponent	Site	Result	Attendance	Source
September 27	Pennsylvania Military	Ohio Field; New York, NY	W 25–7		
October 4	at Lafayette	Fisher Stadium; Easton, PA	W 6–0	7,500	
October 11	Texas A&M	Yankee Stadium; Bronx, NY	L 7–49	18,000	
October 18	Syracuse	Yankee Stadium; Bronx, NY	L 0–31	10,000	
October 25	at Holy Cross	Fitton Field; Worcester, MA	L 0–13	8,000	
October 31	Penn State	Polo Grounds; New York, NY	L 0–42	10,691	
November 8	No. 17 Missouri	Yankee Stadium; Bronx, NY	L 0–26	6,700	
November 15	Tulane	Yankee Stadium; Bronx, NY	L 0–45	10,000	
November 29	vs. No. 8 Fordham	Yankee Stadium; Bronx, NY	L 9–30	31,000	
Rankings from AP Poll released prior to the game

== Program discontinuation ==
Despite having the largest enrollment of any university in the United States, the NYU football program lost $30,000 in 1940 and $35,000 in 1941 and was described as "verging on bankruptcy". In January 1942, the university announced that its Committee on Athletics and Health would study the matter and issue a report on whether the football program should be discontinued. In late February 1942, NYU announced that it was discontinuing the football program for "economical reasons". NYU president Harry Woodburn Chase stated: "Varsity football at New York University has been carried on for the past two years at a substantial deficit and the University cannot maintain the sport any further under the uncertain conditions that prevail." The university also terminated its relationship with head coach Mal Stevens. NYU later restored the football program in 1944.

== Players ==
- Jack Barmak - quarterback
- Len Bates - halfback/fullback (African-American player held out of 1940 game with Missouri for racial reasons)
- Paul Boroff - end and captain
- Rico Casucci - center
- Alverne Chalek - end
- Ross J. Cherico - guard
- B. Cohen - guard
- Carlo Delfino - tackle
- Vincent "Roxie" Finn - right halfback
- Nick Fortiages - guard
- Joe Frank - left halfback
- Haslinger - tackle
- Charlie Heiser - end
- Sam Rosen - tackle
- Wyatt Teubert - halfback
