= 1941 Boston University Terriers football team =

American college football season

1941 Boston University Terriers football
- Conference: Independent
- Record: 5–3
- Head coach: Pat Hanley (8th season)
- Home stadium: Nickerson Field

1941 Eastern college football independents records
	Conf.			Overall
Team	W	L	T	W		L		T
No. 8 Duquesne		–		8	–	0	–	0
Thiel		–		7	–	0	–	0
Saint Francis (PA)		–		6	–	0	–	1
No. 6 Fordham		–		8	–	1	–	0
Rochester		–		6	–	1	–	0
Trinity (CT)		–		6	–	1	–	0
Wagner		–		5	–	1	–	0
Franklin & Marshall		–		5	–	1	–	1
Penn State		–		7	–	2	–	0
Temple		–		7	–	2	–	0
Coast Guard		–		6	–	2	–	0
Norwich		–		6	–	2	–	0
Hofstra		–		5	–	2	–	0
Boston College		–		7	–	3	–	0
Syracuse		–		5	–	2	–	1
Bucknell		–		6	–	3	–	0
Drexel		–		4	–	2	–	1
Boston University		–		5	–	3	–	0
La Salle		–		5	–	3	–	0
Tufts		–		5	–	3	–	0
Army		–		5	–	3	–	1
CCNY		–		4	–	4	–	0
Villanova		–		4	–	4	–	0
Manhattan		–		4	–	4	–	1
Holy Cross		–		4	–	4	–	2
Colgate		–		3	–	3	–	2
Providence		–		3	–	3	–	2
Buffalo		–		3	–	4	–	1
Massachusetts State		–		3	–	4	–	1
Pittsburgh		–		3	–	6	–	0
Vermont		–		2	–	6	–	0
NYU		–		2	–	7	–	0
Carnegie Tech		–		1	–	7	–	0
Rankings from AP Poll

The 1941 Boston University Terriers football team was an American football team that represented Boston University as an independent during the 1941 college football season. In its eighth and final season under head coach Pat Hanley, the team compiled a 5–3 record and outscored opponents by a total of 77 to 51. The team played its home games at the original Nickerson Field in Weston, Massachusetts.

Tackle George Radulski was the team captain. The team's backfield stars were Pete Lamanna, Frank Provinzano, and Walter Williams.

Boston University was ranked at No. 129 (out of 681 teams) in the final rankings under the Litkenhous Difference by Score System for 1941.

After the December 7 Attack on Pearl Harbor, Boston University's coach Pat Hanley was commissioned as a major in the United States Marine Corps. He was the first head coach to join the military after the declaration of war.

== Schedule ==
Date	Time	Opponent	Site	Result	Attendance	Source
October 4		Cincinnati	Nickerson Field; Weston, MA	W 14–13	5,000	
October 11	2:00 p.m.	Upsala	Nickerson Field; Weston, MA	W 17–0		
October 18		at Bucknell	Memorial Stadium; Lewisburg, PA	L 0–6	5,000	
October 24		at Western Maryland	Baltimore Stadium; Baltimore, MD	W 14–0		
November 1	2:00 p.m.	American International	Nickerson Field; Weston, MA	W 6–0		
November 8		at Manhattan	Polo Grounds; New York, NY	L 7–13	6,500	
November 15		New Hampshire	Nickerson Field; Weston, MA	W 12–0	6,000	
November 22		at Boston College	Fenway Park; Boston, MA (rivalry)	L 7–19	40,000	
All times are in Eastern time
