= 1941 Thiel Tomcats football team =

American college football season

1941 Thiel Tomcats football
- Conference: Independent
- Record: 7–0
- Head coach: Jack Stoeber (6th season)
- Captain: Joe DeFebo
- Home stadium: Packard Park

1941 Eastern college football independents records
	Conf.			Overall
Team	W	L	T	W		L		T
No. 8 Duquesne		–		8	–	0	–	0
Thiel		–		7	–	0	–	0
Saint Francis (PA)		–		6	–	0	–	1
No. 6 Fordham		–		8	–	1	–	0
Rochester		–		6	–	1	–	0
Trinity (CT)		–		6	–	1	–	0
Wagner		–		5	–	1	–	0
Franklin & Marshall		–		5	–	1	–	1
Penn State		–		7	–	2	–	0
Temple		–		7	–	2	–	0
Coast Guard		–		6	–	2	–	0
Norwich		–		6	–	2	–	0
Hofstra		–		5	–	2	–	0
Boston College		–		7	–	3	–	0
Syracuse		–		5	–	2	–	1
Bucknell		–		6	–	3	–	0
Drexel		–		4	–	2	–	1
Boston University		–		5	–	3	–	0
La Salle		–		5	–	3	–	0
Tufts		–		5	–	3	–	0
Army		–		5	–	3	–	1
CCNY		–		4	–	4	–	0
Villanova		–		4	–	4	–	0
Manhattan		–		4	–	4	–	1
Holy Cross		–		4	–	4	–	2
Colgate		–		3	–	3	–	2
Providence		–		3	–	3	–	2
Buffalo		–		3	–	4	–	1
Massachusetts State		–		3	–	4	–	1
Pittsburgh		–		3	–	6	–	0
Vermont		–		2	–	6	–	0
NYU		–		2	–	7	–	0
Carnegie Tech		–		1	–	7	–	0
Rankings from AP Poll

The 1941 Thiel Tomcats football team was an American football team that represented Thiel College in Greenville, Pennsylvania, as an independent during the 1941 college football season. In their sixth year under head coach Jack Stoeber, the Tomcats compiled a perfect 7–0 record, shut out six of seven opponents, and outscored all opponents by a total of 146 to 7.

Sophomore fullback Pete Battisti and team captain and halfback Joe DeFebo tied for the team scoring lead with 32 points each. Battisti also punted for Thiel and had punts of 87 and 74 yards in the final game of the season against Grove City.

The football program ceased competition during World War II. After a four-year hiatus, the program resumed play with the undefeated 1946 Thiel Tomcats football team. Thiel won 15 consecutive games from 1941 through the first game of 1947.

The team played its home game at Packard Park in Greenville, Pennsylvania.

== Schedule ==
Date	Opponent	Site	Result	Attendance	Source
October 4	Lock Haven	Packard Park; Greenville, PA	W 22–0	< 1,000	
October 11	Clarion	Packard Park; Greenville, PA	W 26–0		
October 18	at Hiram	Hiram, OH	W 34–0		
October 25	Westminster (PA)^{†}	Packard Park; Greenville, PA	W 14–0	2,000	
November 1	at Ithaca	Ithaca, NY	W 13–7		
November 8	at Allegheny	Montgomery Field; Meadville, PA	W 26–0		
November 15	at Grove City	Grove City, PA	W 12–0		
^{†}Homecoming
