= 1941 Manhattan Jaspers football team =

American college football season

1941 Manhattan Jaspers football
- Conference: Independent
- Record: 4–4–1
- Head coach: Herb Kopf (4th season)
- Home stadium: Polo Grounds, Randall's Island Stadium

1941 Eastern college football independents records
	Conf.			Overall
Team	W	L	T	W		L		T
No. 8 Duquesne		–		8	–	0	–	0
Thiel		–		7	–	0	–	0
Saint Francis (PA)		–		6	–	0	–	1
No. 6 Fordham		–		8	–	1	–	0
Rochester		–		6	–	1	–	0
Trinity (CT)		–		6	–	1	–	0
Wagner		–		5	–	1	–	0
Franklin & Marshall		–		5	–	1	–	1
Penn State		–		7	–	2	–	0
Temple		–		7	–	2	–	0
Coast Guard		–		6	–	2	–	0
Norwich		–		6	–	2	–	0
Hofstra		–		5	–	2	–	0
Boston College		–		7	–	3	–	0
Syracuse		–		5	–	2	–	1
Bucknell		–		6	–	3	–	0
Drexel		–		4	–	2	–	1
Boston University		–		5	–	3	–	0
La Salle		–		5	–	3	–	0
Tufts		–		5	–	3	–	0
Army		–		5	–	3	–	1
CCNY		–		4	–	4	–	0
Villanova		–		4	–	4	–	0
Manhattan		–		4	–	4	–	1
Holy Cross		–		4	–	4	–	2
Colgate		–		3	–	3	–	2
Providence		–		3	–	3	–	2
Buffalo		–		3	–	4	–	1
Massachusetts State		–		3	–	4	–	1
Pittsburgh		–		3	–	6	–	0
Vermont		–		2	–	6	–	0
NYU		–		2	–	7	–	0
Carnegie Tech		–		1	–	7	–	0
Rankings from AP Poll

The 1941 Manhattan Jaspers football team was an American football team that represented Manhattan College as an independent during the 1941 college football season. In its fourth season under head coach Herb Kopf, the team compiled a 4–4–1 record and was outscored by a total of 116 to 98.

Manhattan was ranked at No. 79 (out of 681 teams) in the final rankings under the Litkenhous Difference by Score System for 1941.

== Schedule ==
Date	Opponent	Site	Result	Attendance	Source
September 27	St. Bonaventure	Randall's Island Stadium; New York, NY	W 20–13	8,000	
October 3	George Washington	Polo Grounds; New York, NY	W 23–0	7,032	
October 10	at Duquesne	Polo Grounds; New York, NY	L 7–26	11,127	
October 18	at Boston College	Fenway Park; Boston, MA	L 13–26	12,000	
October 24	No. T–19 Villanova	Polo Grounds; New York, NY	W 9–6	10,000	
November 1	Detroit	Polo Grounds; New York, NY	L 0–15	10,131	
November 8	Boston University	Polo Grounds; New York, NY	W 13–7	6,500	
November 15	at Holy Cross	Fitton Field; Worcester, MA	T 13–13	12,000	
November 20	Georgetown	Polo Grounds; New York, NY	L 0–7	12,066	
