= 1941 Syracuse Orangemen football team =

American college football season

1941 Syracuse Orangemen football
- Conference: Independent
- Record: 5–2–1
- Head coach: Ossie Solem (5th season)
- Captain: Thomas Kinney
- Home stadium: Archbold Stadium

1941 Eastern college football independents records
	Conf.			Overall
Team	W	L	T	W		L		T
No. 8 Duquesne		–		8	–	0	–	0
Thiel		–		7	–	0	–	0
Saint Francis (PA)		–		6	–	0	–	1
No. 6 Fordham		–		8	–	1	–	0
Rochester		–		6	–	1	–	0
Trinity (CT)		–		6	–	1	–	0
Wagner		–		5	–	1	–	0
Franklin & Marshall		–		5	–	1	–	1
Penn State		–		7	–	2	–	0
Temple		–		7	–	2	–	0
Coast Guard		–		6	–	2	–	0
Norwich		–		6	–	2	–	0
Hofstra		–		5	–	2	–	0
Boston College		–		7	–	3	–	0
Syracuse		–		5	–	2	–	1
Bucknell		–		6	–	3	–	0
Drexel		–		4	–	2	–	1
Boston University		–		5	–	3	–	0
La Salle		–		5	–	3	–	0
Tufts		–		5	–	3	–	0
Army		–		5	–	3	–	1
CCNY		–		4	–	4	–	0
Villanova		–		4	–	4	–	0
Manhattan		–		4	–	4	–	1
Holy Cross		–		4	–	4	–	2
Colgate		–		3	–	3	–	2
Providence		–		3	–	3	–	2
Buffalo		–		3	–	4	–	1
Massachusetts State		–		3	–	4	–	1
Pittsburgh		–		3	–	6	–	0
Vermont		–		2	–	6	–	0
NYU		–		2	–	7	–	0
Carnegie Tech		–		1	–	7	–	0
Rankings from AP Poll

The 1941 Syracuse Orangemen football team was an American football team that represented Syracuse University as an independent during the 1941 college football season. In its fifth season under head coach Ossie Solem, the team compiled a 5–2–1 record and outscored opponents by a total of 190 to 86.

Guard Dick Weber was selected by the Associated Press as a second-team player on the 1941 All-Eastern football team.

Syracuse was ranked at No. 34 (out of 681 teams) in the final rankings under the Litkenhous Difference by Score System for 1941.

The team played its home games at Archbold Stadium in Syracuse, New York.

== Schedule ==
Date	Opponent	Rank	Site	Result	Attendance	Source
September 26	Clarkson		Archbold Stadium; Syracuse, NY	W 39–0	17,000	
October 4	at Cornell		Schoellkopf Field; Ithaca, NY	L 0–6	18,000	
October 11	Holy Cross		Archbold Stadium; Syracuse, NY	W 6–0	16,000	
October 18	at NYU		Yankee Stadium; New York, NY	W 31–0	10,000	
October 25	Rutgers		Archbold Stadium; Syracuse, NY	W 49–7	10,000	
November 1	at Wisconsin		Camp Randall Stadium; Madison, WI	W 27–20	19,000	
November 8	at Penn State	No. 18	New Beaver Field; University Park, PA (rivalry)	L 19–34	16,000	
November 15	Colgate		Archbold Stadium; Syracuse, NY (rivalry)	T 19–19	34,000	
Rankings from AP Poll released prior to the game

== Rankings ==
Ranking movements Legend: ██ Increase in ranking ██ Decrease in ranking — = Not ranked
	Week							
Poll	1	2	3	4	5	6	7	Final
AP	—	—	—	18	—	—	—	—
