= 1941 Colgate Red Raiders football team =

American college football season

1941 Colgate Red Raiders football
- Conference: Independent
- Record: 3–3–2
- Head coach: Andrew Kerr (13th season)
- Captain: Hans Guenther
- Home stadium: Colgate Athletic Field

1941 Eastern college football independents records
	Conf.			Overall
Team	W	L	T	W		L		T
No. 8 Duquesne		–		8	–	0	–	0
Thiel		–		7	–	0	–	0
Saint Francis (PA)		–		6	–	0	–	1
No. 6 Fordham		–		8	–	1	–	0
Rochester		–		6	–	1	–	0
Trinity (CT)		–		6	–	1	–	0
Wagner		–		5	–	1	–	0
Franklin & Marshall		–		5	–	1	–	1
Penn State		–		7	–	2	–	0
Temple		–		7	–	2	–	0
Coast Guard		–		6	–	2	–	0
Norwich		–		6	–	2	–	0
Hofstra		–		5	–	2	–	0
Boston College		–		7	–	3	–	0
Syracuse		–		5	–	2	–	1
Bucknell		–		6	–	3	–	0
Drexel		–		4	–	2	–	1
Boston University		–		5	–	3	–	0
La Salle		–		5	–	3	–	0
Tufts		–		5	–	3	–	0
Army		–		5	–	3	–	1
CCNY		–		4	–	4	–	0
Villanova		–		4	–	4	–	0
Manhattan		–		4	–	4	–	1
Holy Cross		–		4	–	4	–	2
Colgate		–		3	–	3	–	2
Providence		–		3	–	3	–	2
Buffalo		–		3	–	4	–	1
Massachusetts State		–		3	–	4	–	1
Pittsburgh		–		3	–	6	–	0
Vermont		–		2	–	6	–	0
NYU		–		2	–	7	–	0
Carnegie Tech		–		1	–	7	–	0
Rankings from AP Poll

The 1941 Colgate Red Raiders football team was an American football team that represented Colgate University as an independent during the 1941 college football season. In its 13th season under head coach Andrew Kerr, the team compiled a 3–3–2 record.

Colgate was ranked at No. 37 (out of 681 teams) in the final rankings under the Litkenhous Difference by Score System for 1941.

The team played its home games at Colgate Athletic Field in Hamilton, New York.

== Schedule ==
Date	Opponent	Site	Result	Attendance	Source
September 27	St. Lawrence	Colgate Athletic Field; Hamilton, NY	W 66–0	4,500	
October 4	vs. Penn State	Civic Stadium; Buffalo, NY	W 7–0	13,000	
October 11	at Dartmouth	Memorial Field; Hanover, NH	L 6–18		
October 18	at Duke	Duke Stadium; Durham, NC	L 14–27	25,000	
October 25	at Cornell	Schoellkopf Field; Ithaca, NY (rivalry)	L 2–21		
November 1	Holy Cross	Colgate Athletic Field; Hamilton, NY	T 6–6	7,000	
November 15	at Syracuse	Archbold Stadium; Syracuse, NY	T 19–19	34,000	
November 22	at Columbia	Baker Field; New York, NY	W 30–21	23,000	
