= 1941 Boston College Eagles football team =

American college football season

1941 Boston College Eagles football
- Conference: Independent
- Record: 7–3
- Head coach: Denny Myers (1st season)
- Captain: Al Morro
- Home stadium: Alumni Field

1941 Eastern college football independents records
| | Conf. | | | Overall |
| Team | W | L | T | W | | L | | T |
|---|---|---|---|---|---|---|---|---|
| No. 8 Duquesne | | – | | 8 | – | 0 | – | 0 |
| Thiel | | – | | 7 | – | 0 | – | 0 |
| Saint Francis (PA) | | – | | 6 | – | 0 | – | 1 |
| No. 6 Fordham | | – | | 8 | – | 1 | – | 0 |
| Rochester | | – | | 6 | – | 1 | – | 0 |
| Trinity (CT) | | – | | 6 | – | 1 | – | 0 |
| Wagner | | – | | 5 | – | 1 | – | 0 |
| Franklin & Marshall | | – | | 5 | – | 1 | – | 1 |
| Penn State | | – | | 7 | – | 2 | – | 0 |
| Temple | | – | | 7 | – | 2 | – | 0 |
| Coast Guard | | – | | 6 | – | 2 | – | 0 |
| Norwich | | – | | 6 | – | 2 | – | 0 |
| Hofstra | | – | | 5 | – | 2 | – | 0 |
| Boston College | | – | | 7 | – | 3 | – | 0 |
| Syracuse | | – | | 5 | – | 2 | – | 1 |
| Bucknell | | – | | 6 | – | 3 | – | 0 |
| Drexel | | – | | 4 | – | 2 | – | 1 |
| Boston University | | – | | 5 | – | 3 | – | 0 |
| La Salle | | – | | 5 | – | 3 | – | 0 |
| Tufts | | – | | 5 | – | 3 | – | 0 |
| Army | | – | | 5 | – | 3 | – | 1 |
| CCNY | | – | | 4 | – | 4 | – | 0 |
| Villanova | | – | | 4 | – | 4 | – | 0 |
| Manhattan | | – | | 4 | – | 4 | – | 1 |
| Holy Cross | | – | | 4 | – | 4 | – | 2 |
| Colgate | | – | | 3 | – | 3 | – | 2 |
| Providence | | – | | 3 | – | 3 | – | 2 |
| Buffalo | | – | | 3 | – | 4 | – | 1 |
| Massachusetts State | | – | | 3 | – | 4 | – | 1 |
| Pittsburgh | | – | | 3 | – | 6 | – | 0 |
| Vermont | | – | | 2 | – | 6 | – | 0 |
| NYU | | – | | 2 | – | 7 | – | 0 |
| Carnegie Tech | | – | | 1 | – | 7 | – | 0 |
Rankings from AP Poll

The 1941 Boston College Eagles football team was an American football team that represented Boston College as an independent during the 1941 college football season. In its first year under head coach Denny Myers, the team compiled a 7–3 record and outscored opponents by a total of 235 to 106. The team played its home games at Alumni Field in Chestnut Hill, Massachusetts and Fenway Park in Boston.

Three Boston College players were selected by the United Press as first-team players on the 1941 All-New England football team: center Naumetz, tackle Morro, and halfback Frank "Monk" Maznicki. Other key players included backs Mike Holovak, Adolph Kissell, Ted Williams, and Lorenzo Castiglione.

== Schedule ==
| Date | Opponent | Rank | Site | Result | Attendance | Source |
|---|---|---|---|---|---|---|
| September 20 | Saint Anselm | | Newton, MA | W 78–0 | 20,000 | |
| September 27 | at Tulane | | Tulane Stadium; New Orleans, LA | L 7–21 | 45,000 | |
| October 11 | Clemson | | Fenway Park; Boston, MA (rivalry) | L 13–26 | 23,000 | |
| October 18 | Manhattan | | Fenway Park; Boston, MA | W 26–13 | 12,000 | |
| October 25 | Georgetown | | Fenway Park; Boston, MA | W 14–6 | 22,000 | |
| November 1 | No. 13 Temple | | Fenway Park; Boston, MA | W 31–0 | 15,000 | |
| November 8 | Wake Forest | | Alumni Field; Chestnut Hill, MA | W 26–6 | 13,446 | |
| November 15 | Tennessee | No. 18 | Fenway Park; Boston, MA | L 7–14 | 32,000 | |
| November 22 | vs. Boston University | | Fenway Park; Boston, MA (rivalry) | W 19–7 | 15,000 | |
| November 29 | vs. Holy Cross | | Fenway Park; Boston, MA (rivalry) | W 14–13 | 40,000 | |
Rankings from AP Poll released prior to the game

== Rankings ==
Ranking movements Legend: ██ Increase in ranking ██ Decrease in ranking — = Not ranked
| | Week | | | | | | | |
| Poll | 1 | 2 | 3 | 4 | 5 | 6 | 7 | Final |
|---|---|---|---|---|---|---|---|---|
| AP | — | — | — | — | 18 | — | — | — |
