= 1941 Bucknell Bison football team =

American college football season

1941 Bucknell Bison football
- Conference: Independent
- Record: 6–3
- Head coach: Al Humphreys (5th season)
- Home stadium: Memorial Stadium

1941 Eastern college football independents records
	Conf.			Overall
Team	W	L	T	W		L		T
No. 8 Duquesne		–		8	–	0	–	0
Thiel		–		7	–	0	–	0
Saint Francis (PA)		–		6	–	0	–	1
No. 6 Fordham		–		8	–	1	–	0
Rochester		–		6	–	1	–	0
Trinity (CT)		–		6	–	1	–	0
Wagner		–		5	–	1	–	0
Franklin & Marshall		–		5	–	1	–	1
Penn State		–		7	–	2	–	0
Temple		–		7	–	2	–	0
Coast Guard		–		6	–	2	–	0
Norwich		–		6	–	2	–	0
Hofstra		–		5	–	2	–	0
Boston College		–		7	–	3	–	0
Syracuse		–		5	–	2	–	1
Bucknell		–		6	–	3	–	0
Drexel		–		4	–	2	–	1
Boston University		–		5	–	3	–	0
La Salle		–		5	–	3	–	0
Tufts		–		5	–	3	–	0
Army		–		5	–	3	–	1
CCNY		–		4	–	4	–	0
Villanova		–		4	–	4	–	0
Manhattan		–		4	–	4	–	1
Holy Cross		–		4	–	4	–	2
Colgate		–		3	–	3	–	2
Providence		–		3	–	3	–	2
Buffalo		–		3	–	4	–	1
Massachusetts State		–		3	–	4	–	1
Pittsburgh		–		3	–	6	–	0
Vermont		–		2	–	6	–	0
NYU		–		2	–	7	–	0
Carnegie Tech		–		1	–	7	–	0
Rankings from AP Poll

The 1941 Bucknell Bison football team was an American football team that represented Bucknell University as an independent during the 1941 college football season. In its fifth season under head coach Al Humphreys, the team compiled a 6–3 record.

Bucknell was ranked at No. 124 (out of 681 teams) in the final rankings under the Litkenhous Difference by Score System for 1941.

The team played its home games at Memorial Stadium in Lewisburg, Pennsylvania.

== Schedule ==
Date	Opponent	Site	Result	Attendance	Source
September 27	Lebanon Valley	Memorial Stadium; Lewisburg, PA	W 12–7		
October 4	at Muhlenberg	Muhlenberg Field; Allentown, PA	W 12–0	4,000	
October 11	at Penn State	New Beaver Field; State College, PA	L 13–27	16,000	
October 18	Boston University^{†}	Memorial Stadium; Lewisburg, PA	W 6–0	5,000	
October 24	at No. 17 Temple	Temple Stadium; Philadelphia, PA	L 14–41	20,000	
November 1	Western Maryland	Memorial Stadium; Lewisburg, PA	W 26–7		
November 8	Gettysburg	Memorial Stadium; Lewisburg, PA	L 0–12		
November 14	at George Washington	Griffith Stadium; Washington, DC	W 6–0	6,000	
November 22	at Albright	Reading, PA	W 42–0	5,000	
^{†}Homecoming; Rankings from Coaches' Poll released prior to the game
