= 1941 Army Cadets football team =

American college football season

1941 Army Cadets football
- Conference: Independent
- Record: 5–3–1
- Head coach: Earl Blaik (1st season)
- Captain: Ray Murphy
- Home stadium: Michie Stadium

1941 Eastern college football independents records
	Conf.			Overall
Team	W	L	T	W		L		T
No. 8 Duquesne		–		8	–	0	–	0
Thiel		–		7	–	0	–	0
Saint Francis (PA)		–		6	–	0	–	1
No. 6 Fordham		–		8	–	1	–	0
Rochester		–		6	–	1	–	0
Trinity (CT)		–		6	–	1	–	0
Wagner		–		5	–	1	–	0
Franklin & Marshall		–		5	–	1	–	1
Penn State		–		7	–	2	–	0
Temple		–		7	–	2	–	0
Coast Guard		–		6	–	2	–	0
Norwich		–		6	–	2	–	0
Hofstra		–		5	–	2	–	0
Boston College		–		7	–	3	–	0
Syracuse		–		5	–	2	–	1
Bucknell		–		6	–	3	–	0
Drexel		–		4	–	2	–	1
Boston University		–		5	–	3	–	0
La Salle		–		5	–	3	–	0
Tufts		–		5	–	3	–	0
Army		–		5	–	3	–	1
CCNY		–		4	–	4	–	0
Villanova		–		4	–	4	–	0
Manhattan		–		4	–	4	–	1
Holy Cross		–		4	–	4	–	2
Colgate		–		3	–	3	–	2
Providence		–		3	–	3	–	2
Buffalo		–		3	–	4	–	1
Massachusetts State		–		3	–	4	–	1
Pittsburgh		–		3	–	6	–	0
Vermont		–		2	–	6	–	0
NYU		–		2	–	7	–	0
Carnegie Tech		–		1	–	7	–	0
Rankings from AP Poll

The 1941 Army Cadets football team represented the United States Military Academy as an independent during the 1941 college football season. In their first year under head coach Earl Blaik, the Cadets compiled a 5–3–1 record and outscored their opponents by a combined total of 105 to 87.

The season represented a four-game improvement on the prior year's record of 1–7–1. Army opened with four wins, then played a scoreless tie with undefeated Notre Dame at Yankee Stadium. The 11th-ranked Cadets then lost on the road in consecutive weeks to Harvard and Penn. In the annual Army–Navy Game, the Midshipmen won for the third straight year.

Army halfback Hank Mazur was selected by Life magazine as a third-team player on the All-America team. Mazur was also selected by the Associated Press as a second-team player on the 1941 All-Eastern football team.

Army was ranked at No. 45 (out of 681 teams) in the final rankings under the Litkenhous Difference by Score System for 1941.

== Schedule ==
Date	Opponent	Rank	Site	Result	Attendance	Source
October 4	The Citadel		Michie Stadium; West Point, NY	W 19–6	7,000	
October 11	VMI		Michie Stadium; West Point, NY	W 27–20	7,000	
October 18	at Yale		Yale Bowl; New Haven, CT	W 20–7	56,000	
October 25	Columbia		Michie Stadium; West Point, NY	W 13–0	28,000	
November 1	vs. No. 6 Notre Dame	No. 14	Yankee Stadium; Bronx, NY (rivalry)	T 0–0	76,000	
November 8	at Harvard	No. 11	Harvard Stadium; Boston, MA	L 6–20	53,000	
November 15	at No. 14 Penn	No. 19	Franklin Field; Philadelphia, PA	L 7–14	70,000	
November 22	West Virginia		Michie Stadium; West Point, NY	W 7–6	25,000	
November 29	vs. No. 11 Navy		Philadelphia Municipal Stadium; Philadelphia, PA (Army–Navy Game)	L 6–14	98,924	
Rankings from AP Poll released prior to the game

== Rankings ==
Ranking movements Legend: ██ Increase in ranking ██ Decrease in ranking — = Not ranked
	Week							
Poll	1	2	3	4	5	6	7	Final
AP	—	—	14	11	19	—	—	—
