= 1941 Holy Cross Crusaders football team =

American college football season

1941 Holy Cross Crusaders football
- Conference: Independent
- Record: 4–4–2
- Head coach: Joe Sheeketski (3rd season)
- Home stadium: Fitton Field

1941 Eastern college football independents records
	Conf.			Overall
Team	W	L	T	W		L		T
No. 8 Duquesne		–		8	–	0	–	0
Thiel		–		7	–	0	–	0
Saint Francis (PA)		–		6	–	0	–	1
No. 6 Fordham		–		8	–	1	–	0
Rochester		–		6	–	1	–	0
Trinity (CT)		–		6	–	1	–	0
Wagner		–		5	–	1	–	0
Franklin & Marshall		–		5	–	1	–	1
Penn State		–		7	–	2	–	0
Temple		–		7	–	2	–	0
Coast Guard		–		6	–	2	–	0
Norwich		–		6	–	2	–	0
Hofstra		–		5	–	2	–	0
Boston College		–		7	–	3	–	0
Syracuse		–		5	–	2	–	1
Bucknell		–		6	–	3	–	0
Drexel		–		4	–	2	–	1
Boston University		–		5	–	3	–	0
La Salle		–		5	–	3	–	0
Tufts		–		5	–	3	–	0
Army		–		5	–	3	–	1
CCNY		–		4	–	4	–	0
Villanova		–		4	–	4	–	0
Manhattan		–		4	–	4	–	1
Holy Cross		–		4	–	4	–	2
Colgate		–		3	–	3	–	2
Providence		–		3	–	3	–	2
Buffalo		–		3	–	4	–	1
Massachusetts State		–		3	–	4	–	1
Pittsburgh		–		3	–	6	–	0
Vermont		–		2	–	6	–	0
NYU		–		2	–	7	–	0
Carnegie Tech		–		1	–	7	–	0
Rankings from AP Poll

The 1941 Holy Cross Crusaders football team was an American football team represented the College of the Holy Cross as an independent during the 1941 college football season. In its third and final season under head coach Joe Sheeketski, the team compiled a 4–4–2 record and was outscored by a total of 104 to 103.

Two Holy Cross players were selected by the United Press as first-team players on the 1941 All-New England football team: quarterback Francis L. Saba and fullback John Grigas.

Holy Cross was ranked at No. 73 (out of 681 teams) in the final rankings under the Litkenhous Difference by Score System for 1941.

The team played its home games at Fitton Field in Worcester, Massachusetts.

== Schedule ==
Date	Opponent	Site	Result	Attendance	Source
September 27	at LSU	Tiger Stadium; Baton Rouge, LA	W 19–13	25,000	
October 4	Providence	Fitton Field; Worcester, MA	W 13–0	15,000	
October 11	at Syracuse	Archbold Stadium; Syracuse, NY	L 0–6	16,000	
October 18	Ole Miss	Fitton Field; Worcester, MA	L 0–21	22,000	
October 25	NYU	Fitton Field; Worcester, MA	W 13–0	8,000	
November 1	at Colgate	Colgate Athletic Field; Hamilton, NY	T 6–6	7,000	
November 8	at Brown	Brown Stadium; Providence, RI	W 13–0		
November 14	Manhattan	Fitton Field; Worcester, MA	T 13–13	12,000	
November 22	Temple	Fitton Field; Worcester, MA	L 13–31	14,000	
November 29	at Boston College	Fenway Park; Boston, MA (rivalry)	L 13–14	40,000	
