= 1941 Fordham Rams football team =

American college football season

1941 Fordham Rams football

Sugar Bowl champion Eastern champion

Sugar Bowl, W 2–0 vs. Missouri
- Conference: Independent

Ranking
- AP: No. 6
- Record: 8–1
- Head coach: Jim Crowley (9th season)
- Home stadium: Polo Grounds

1941 Eastern college football independents records
	Conf.			Overall
Team	W	L	T	W		L		T
No. 8 Duquesne		–		8	–	0	–	0
Thiel		–		7	–	0	–	0
Saint Francis (PA)		–		6	–	0	–	1
No. 6 Fordham		–		8	–	1	–	0
Rochester		–		6	–	1	–	0
Trinity (CT)		–		6	–	1	–	0
Wagner		–		5	–	1	–	0
Franklin & Marshall		–		5	–	1	–	1
Penn State		–		7	–	2	–	0
Temple		–		7	–	2	–	0
Coast Guard		–		6	–	2	–	0
Norwich		–		6	–	2	–	0
Hofstra		–		5	–	2	–	0
Boston College		–		7	–	3	–	0
Syracuse		–		5	–	2	–	1
Bucknell		–		6	–	3	–	0
Drexel		–		4	–	2	–	1
Boston University		–		5	–	3	–	0
La Salle		–		5	–	3	–	0
Tufts		–		5	–	3	–	0
Army		–		5	–	3	–	1
CCNY		–		4	–	4	–	0
Villanova		–		4	–	4	–	0
Manhattan		–		4	–	4	–	1
Holy Cross		–		4	–	4	–	2
Colgate		–		3	–	3	–	2
Providence		–		3	–	3	–	2
Buffalo		–		3	–	4	–	1
Massachusetts State		–		3	–	4	–	1
Pittsburgh		–		3	–	6	–	0
Vermont		–		2	–	6	–	0
NYU		–		2	–	7	–	0
Carnegie Tech		–		1	–	7	–	0
Rankings from AP Poll

The 1941 Fordham Rams football team was an American football team that represented Fordham University as an independent during the 1941 college football season. In their ninth season under head coach Jim Crowley, the Rams compiled an 8–1 record, outscored opponents by a total of 182 to 67, and were ranked No. 6 in the final AP poll.

During the regular season, the Rams played a national schedule with wins over teams from the south (SMU, North Carolina, West Virginia, TCU), Midwest (Purdue), and west (Saint Mary's), while suffering their only loss to Pittsburgh. They concluded their season with a 2–0 victory over Missouri in the 1942 Sugar Bowl. The game was played in heavy rain and the only score came off of a blocked punt in the first quarter.

Fordham end Jim Lansing was selected by Liberty magazine as a first-team player on the 1941 All-America team. Fullback Steve Filipowicz completed 37 of 101 passes for 722 yards during the regular season and was selected by the Associated Press (AP) a first-team player on the 1941 All-Eastern football team. Guard Larry Sartori was named to the second team.

The team played its home games at the Polo Grounds in Upper Manhattan.

== Schedule ==
Date	Opponent	Rank	Site	Result	Attendance	Source
October 4	SMU		Polo Grounds; New York, NY	W 16–10	28,500	
October 11	at North Carolina		Kenan Memorial Stadium; Chapel Hill, NC	W 27–14	27,000	
October 18	West Virginia	No. 4	Polo Grounds; New York, NY	W 27–0	12,500	
October 25	TCU	No. 6	Polo Grounds; New York, NY	W 28–14	39,500	
November 1	Purdue	No. 3	Polo Grounds; New York, NY	W 17–0	20,500	
November 8	at Pittsburgh	No. 3	Pitt Stadium; Pittsburgh, PA	L 0–13	25,000	
November 22	vs. Saint Mary's	No. 11	Polo Grounds; New York, NY	W 35–7	40,000	
November 29	NYU	No. 8	Yankee Stadium; Bronx, NY	W 30–9	31,000	
January 1	vs. No. 7 Missouri	No. 6	Tulane Stadium; New Orleans, LA (Sugar Bowl)	W 2–0	73,000	
Rankings from AP Poll released prior to the game

== Rankings ==
Ranking movements Legend: ██ Increase in ranking ██ Decrease in ranking ( ) = First-place votes
	Week							
Poll	1	2	3	4	5	6	7	Final
AP	4	6	3 (7)	3 (6)	11	11	8	6

== Roster ==
- Joseph Andrejco, halfback, No. 46, sophomore, 6'0", 190 pounds, Beaver Meadows, PA
- Thomas Bennett, guard, No. 11, 5'11", 175 pounds, Ansonia, CT
- James Blumenstock, halfback, No. 51, senior, 5'10", 178 pounds, Rutherford, NJ
- Steve Filipowicz, fullback, No. 25, junior, 5'8", 185 pounds, Kulpmont, PA
- Stephen Hudasek, tackle, No. 7, senior, 6'1", 195 pounds, Plymouth, PA
- Jim Lansing, end, No. 14, junior, 6'0", 186 pounds, Pelham, NY
- James Noble, quarterback, No. 12, senior, 5'10", 162 pounds, Easton, PA
- Joseph Sabasteanski, center, No. 35, junior, 6'0", 198 pounds, Portland, ME
- Larry Sartori, captain and guard, No. 1, senior, 6'0", 200 pounds, Shepton, PA
- Edward Slodowski, tackle, No. 41, sophomore, 6'2", 206 pounds, Jersey City, NJ
- George Topo, end, No. 31, sophomore, 6'2", 215 pounds, Tamaqua, PA
