= 1941 Duquesne Dukes football team =

American college football season

1941 Duquesne Dukes football

Co-national champion (Massey Ratings)
- Conference: Independent

Ranking
- AP: No. 8
- Record: 8–0
- Head coach: Aldo Donelli (3rd season); Steve Sinko (interim)
- Home stadium: Forbes Field

1941 Eastern college football independents records
	Conf.			Overall
Team	W	L	T	W		L		T
No. 8 Duquesne		–		8	–	0	–	0
Thiel		–		7	–	0	–	0
Saint Francis (PA)		–		6	–	0	–	1
No. 6 Fordham		–		8	–	1	–	0
Rochester		–		6	–	1	–	0
Trinity (CT)		–		6	–	1	–	0
Wagner		–		5	–	1	–	0
Franklin & Marshall		–		5	–	1	–	1
Penn State		–		7	–	2	–	0
Temple		–		7	–	2	–	0
Coast Guard		–		6	–	2	–	0
Norwich		–		6	–	2	–	0
Hofstra		–		5	–	2	–	0
Boston College		–		7	–	3	–	0
Syracuse		–		5	–	2	–	1
Bucknell		–		6	–	3	–	0
Drexel		–		4	–	2	–	1
Boston University		–		5	–	3	–	0
La Salle		–		5	–	3	–	0
Tufts		–		5	–	3	–	0
Army		–		5	–	3	–	1
CCNY		–		4	–	4	–	0
Villanova		–		4	–	4	–	0
Manhattan		–		4	–	4	–	1
Holy Cross		–		4	–	4	–	2
Colgate		–		3	–	3	–	2
Providence		–		3	–	3	–	2
Buffalo		–		3	–	4	–	1
Massachusetts State		–		3	–	4	–	1
Pittsburgh		–		3	–	6	–	0
Vermont		–		2	–	6	–	0
NYU		–		2	–	7	–	0
Carnegie Tech		–		1	–	7	–	0
Rankings from AP Poll

The 1941 Duquesne Dukes football team was an American football team that represented Duquesne University as an independent during the 1941 college football season. Duquesne completed a perfect season with an 8–0 record, shut out five of eight opponents, and outscored all opponents by a total of 143 to 23. Duquesne won games against Marquette, Villanova, Saint Mary's, and previously undefeated Mississippi State. The Dukes were ranked No. 8 in the final AP Poll; they were later retroactively selected as a co-national champion by the Massey Ratings.

Aldo Donelli was the head coach for the first two games but then resigned to become head coach of the Pittsburgh Steelers. Steve Sinko took over as Duquesne's acting head coach after Donelli's resignation. National Collegiate Athletic Association (NCAA) and Duquesne records credit the entire season to Donelli's head coaching record.

Two Duquesne players received first-team honors on the 1941 All-America team:

- End John Rokisky received first-team All-America honors from Collier's Weekly and the Newspaper Enterprise Association (NEA) and second-team All-America honors from the Associated Press (AP). He was also honored by the AP as a first-team player on the 1941 All-Eastern football team. Rokisky later played three years of professional football in the All-America Football Conference.
- Center Al DeMao received first-team All-America honors from Life magazine and second-team All-America honors from the United Press (UP). He also received second-team honors from the AP on the All-Eastern team. DeMao later played nine years in the NFL with the Washington Redskins.

The team played its home games at Forbes Field in Pittsburgh, Pennsylvania.

== Schedule ==
Date	Opponent	Rank	Site	Result	Attendance	Source
September 20	Waynesburg		Forbes Field; Pittsburgh, PA	W 14–2		
September 26	Niagara		Forbes Field; Pittsburgh, PA	W 33–0	11,000	
October 10	at Manhattan		Polo Grounds; New York, NY	W 26–7	11,127	
October 17	Saint Vincent		Forbes Field; Pittsburgh, PA	W 7–0	10,000	
October 25	at Marquette		Marquette Stadium; Milwaukee, WI	W 31–14	> 20,000	
November 1	Villanova	No. 16	Forbes Field; Pittsburgh, PA	W 7–0	20,698	
November 9	at Saint Mary's	No. 12	Kezar Stadium; San Francisco, CA	W 9–0	25,000	
November 15	No. 13 Mississippi State	No. 10	Forbes Field; Pittsburgh, PA	W 16–0	31,483	
Rankings from AP Poll released prior to the game

== Rankings ==
Ranking movements Legend: ██ Increase in ranking ██ Decrease in ranking — = Not ranked
	Week							
Poll	1	2	3	4	5	6	7	Final
AP	—	—	16	12	10	6	5	8
