= 1941 Villanova Wildcats football team =

American college football season

1941 Villanova Wildcats football
- Conference: Independent
- Record: 4–4
- Head coach: Clipper Smith (6th season)
- Captain: Edward Korisky
- Home stadium: Shibe Park

1941 Eastern college football independents records
	Conf.			Overall
Team	W	L	T	W		L		T
No. 8 Duquesne		–		8	–	0	–	0
Thiel		–		7	–	0	–	0
Saint Francis (PA)		–		6	–	0	–	1
No. 6 Fordham		–		8	–	1	–	0
Rochester		–		6	–	1	–	0
Trinity (CT)		–		6	–	1	–	0
Wagner		–		5	–	1	–	0
Franklin & Marshall		–		5	–	1	–	1
Penn State		–		7	–	2	–	0
Temple		–		7	–	2	–	0
Coast Guard		–		6	–	2	–	0
Norwich		–		6	–	2	–	0
Hofstra		–		5	–	2	–	0
Boston College		–		7	–	3	–	0
Syracuse		–		5	–	2	–	1
Bucknell		–		6	–	3	–	0
Drexel		–		4	–	2	–	1
Boston University		–		5	–	3	–	0
La Salle		–		5	–	3	–	0
Tufts		–		5	–	3	–	0
Army		–		5	–	3	–	1
CCNY		–		4	–	4	–	0
Villanova		–		4	–	4	–	0
Manhattan		–		4	–	4	–	1
Holy Cross		–		4	–	4	–	2
Colgate		–		3	–	3	–	2
Providence		–		3	–	3	–	2
Buffalo		–		3	–	4	–	1
Massachusetts State		–		3	–	4	–	1
Pittsburgh		–		3	–	6	–	0
Vermont		–		2	–	6	–	0
NYU		–		2	–	7	–	0
Carnegie Tech		–		1	–	7	–	0
Rankings from AP Poll

The 1941 Villanova Wildcats football team was an American football team that represented Villanova University as an independent during the 1941 college football season. In its sixth season under head coach Clipper Smith, the team compiled a 4–4 record and outscored opponents by a total of 84 to 58.

Center Ed Korisky was selected by the Associated Press as a first-team player on the 1941 All-Eastern football team.

Villanova was ranked at No. 59 (out of 681 teams) in the final rankings under the Litkenhous Difference by Score System for 1941.

The team played its home games at Villanova Stadium in Villanova, Pennsylvania.

== Schedule ==
Date	Opponent	Rank	Site	Result	Attendance	Source
October 4	Centre		Shibe Park; Philadelphia, PA	W 38–3	22,000	
October 11	Florida		Florida Field; Gainesville, FL	W 6–0	> 20,000	
October 17	at Baylor		Shibe Park; Philadelphia, PA	W 14–6	31,360	
October 24	at Manhattan	No. T–19	Polo Grounds; New York, NY	L 6–9	10,000	
November 1	at No. 16 Duquesne		Forbes Field; Pittsburgh, PA	L 0–7	20,698	
November 8	at Temple		Temple Stadium; Philadelphia, PA	L 13–14	30,000	
November 16	at Detroit		Shibe Park; Philadelphia, PA	W 7–6	23,480	
November 22	at Auburn		Shibe Park; Philadelphia, PA	L 0–13	12,000	
Rankings from AP Poll released prior to the game

== Rankings ==
Ranking movements Legend: ██ Increase in ranking ██ Decrease in ranking — = Not ranked т = Tied with team above or below
	Week							
Poll	1	2	3	4	5	6	7	Final
AP	—	19т	—	—	—	—	—	—
