= 1941 Temple Owls football team =

American college football season

1941 Temple Owls football
- Conference: Independent
- Record: 7–2
- Head coach: Ray Morrison (2nd season)
- Home stadium: Temple Stadium

1941 Eastern college football independents records
	Conf.			Overall
Team	W	L	T	W		L		T
No. 8 Duquesne		–		8	–	0	–	0
Thiel		–		7	–	0	–	0
Saint Francis (PA)		–		6	–	0	–	1
No. 6 Fordham		–		8	–	1	–	0
Rochester		–		6	–	1	–	0
Trinity (CT)		–		6	–	1	–	0
Wagner		–		5	–	1	–	0
Franklin & Marshall		–		5	–	1	–	1
Penn State		–		7	–	2	–	0
Temple		–		7	–	2	–	0
Coast Guard		–		6	–	2	–	0
Norwich		–		6	–	2	–	0
Hofstra		–		5	–	2	–	0
Boston College		–		7	–	3	–	0
Syracuse		–		5	–	2	–	1
Bucknell		–		6	–	3	–	0
Drexel		–		4	–	2	–	1
Boston University		–		5	–	3	–	0
La Salle		–		5	–	3	–	0
Tufts		–		5	–	3	–	0
Army		–		5	–	3	–	1
CCNY		–		4	–	4	–	0
Villanova		–		4	–	4	–	0
Manhattan		–		4	–	4	–	1
Holy Cross		–		4	–	4	–	2
Colgate		–		3	–	3	–	2
Providence		–		3	–	3	–	2
Buffalo		–		3	–	4	–	1
Massachusetts State		–		3	–	4	–	1
Pittsburgh		–		3	–	6	–	0
Vermont		–		2	–	6	–	0
NYU		–		2	–	7	–	0
Carnegie Tech		–		1	–	7	–	0
Rankings from AP Poll

The 1941 Temple Owls football team was an American football team that represented Temple University as an independent during the 1941 college football season. In its second season under head coach Ray Morrison, the team compiled a 7–2 record and was outscored by a total of 176 to 146. The team was ranked No. 13 in the AP Poll before losing to Boston College on November 1, 1941.

Back Andy Tomasic was selected by the Associated Press as a first-team player on the 1941 All-Eastern football team. Tackle Hank Zajkowski was named to the second team.

Temple was ranked at No. 68 (out of 681 teams) in the final rankings under the Litkenhous Difference by Score System for 1941.

The team played its home games at Temple Stadium in Philadelphia.

== Schedule ==
Date	Opponent	Rank	Site	Result	Attendance	Source
September 26	Kansas		Temple Stadium; Philadelphia, PA	W 31–9	23,000	
October 4	VMI		Temple Stadium; Philadelphia, PA	W 28–13	15,000	
October 10	Georgetown		Temple Stadium; Philadelphia, PA	W 17–7	33,000	
October 18	Penn State		Temple Stadium; Philadelphia, PA	W 14–0	25,000	
October 24	Bucknell	No. 17	Temple Stadium; Philadelphia, PA	W 41–14	20,000	
November 1	at Boston College	No. 13	Fenway Park; Boston, MA	L 0–31	23,000	
November 8	Villanova		Temple Stadium; Philadelphia, PA	W 14–13	30,000	
November 15	at Michigan State		Macklin Field; East Lansing, MI	L 0–46	15,000	
November 22	at Holy Cross		Fitton Field; Worcester, MA	W 31–13	14,000	
Rankings from AP Poll released prior to the game

== Rankings ==
Ranking movements Legend: ██ Increase in ranking ██ Decrease in ranking — = Not ranked
	Week							
Poll	1	2	3	4	5	6	7	Final
AP	—	17	13	—	—	—	—	—
