= Larry Sartori =

American football player and coach (1917–1980)

- Larry Sartori, 1947

Profile
- Position: Guard

Personal information
- Born: August 20, 1917; Sheppton, Pennsylvania, U.S.
- Died: November 6, 1980 (aged 63); Paramus, New Jersey, U.S.
- Listed height: 6 ft 0 in (1.83 m)
- Listed weight: 208 lb (94 kg)

Career information
- High school: Sheppton (PA)
- College: Fordham

Career history
- Detroit Lions (1942, 1945); Shenandoah Presidents (1947)

Career statistics
- Games: 11
- Stats at Pro Football Reference

Lawrence Matthews "Sunny" Sartori (August 20, 1917 – November 6, 1980) was an American football player and coach.

A native of Sheppton, Pennsylvania, Sartori attended Sheppton High School. He played college football at Fordham University. He was captain of the 1941 Fordham Rams football team that defeated Missouri in the 1942 Sugar Bowl and was ranked No. 6 in the final AP poll. He was also selected to play on the College All-Stars against the Philadelphia Eagles in 1942.

He played professional football in the National Football League (NFL) as a guard for the Detroit Lions in 1942 and 1945. He appeared in 11 NFL games, two as a starter. His football career was interrupted by service in the Navy during World War II.

In 1947, Sartori was the player-coach for the Shenandoah Presidents of the Pennsylvania Professional Football League. After his playing career ended, he coached football at Seton Hall, Brooklyn Prep, Rutherford High School, and Don Bosco High School of Ramsey, New Jersey. He later worked as a mutual clerk at the Yonkers Raceway.

Sartori was inducted to the Fordham University Hall of Fame in 1980. Sartori died in 1980 at Paramus, New Jersey.
