= NFLPA Collegiate Bowl =

College football All-star bowl game

NFLPA Collegiate Bowl (defunct)
- Stadium: Rose Bowl
- Location: Pasadena, California
- Previous stadiums: Home Depot Center / StubHub Center (2012–2017)
- Previous locations: Carson, California (2012–2017)
- Operated: 2012–2023
- Preceded by: Texas vs The Nation

Sponsors
- NFL Players Association

2022 matchup
- National vs. American (National 25–24)

2023 matchup
- National vs. American (American 19–17)

The NFLPA Collegiate Bowl was a postseason college football all-star game for National Football League Draft-eligible players, held annually in January. The event was founded in 2012 by the National Football League Players Association (NFLPA). In 2023, the NFLPA decided to cancel the game after 12 years. The organization currently partners with the Senior Bowl and East–West Shrine Bowl as part of the union's efforts to engage with its future player members.

Players predominantly, but not exclusively, were from teams within the Football Bowl Subdivision (FBS) and the Football Championship Subdivision (FCS). The first six editions of the game were played in Carson, California, at the venue first known as Home Depot Center and later as StubHub Center. Starting with the 2018 edition, the game was held at the Rose Bowl in Pasadena, California.

== History ==
In January 2012, the NFLPA founded the NFLPA Collegiate Bowl after sponsoring the Texas vs The Nation game in previous years. The inaugural NFLPA Collegiate Bowl was open to NFL draft-eligible underclassmen players but, beginning with the second annual event, only draft-eligible seniors were allowed to participate.

The event was established in part to prepare draft-eligible college football players for a career in the NFL. During the week preceding the game, the NFLPA provides an introduction to the players union and educates players on the business side of an NFL career. Current and former NFL players are invited to attend the week's events to share their NFL experiences with the draft eligible players. The NFLPA also hosts community-focused events including a youth football clinic.

The 2012 and 2013 games were hosted at the Home Depot Center in Carson, California. The Home Depot Center was renamed the StubHub Center in June 2013; the venue subsequently hosted the 2014 through 2017 games. In November 2017, bowl organizers announced the game would relocate to the Rose Bowl stadium in Pasadena, California, effective with the 2018 game. The game was sponsored by AstroTurf in 2012, Winnol in 2013, and Panini America in 2014.

The game utilizes some special rules. As of the 2018 edition, a kickoff starts each half (per normal rules), while the second and fourth quarters begin with the team that kicked off the half starting with a first-and-ten at their 25-yard-line. Also, a team trailing by 20 or more points retains possession of the ball following a score.

According to the game's official website, 112 players participated in the 2018 game, representing 84 colleges; 42 players were invited to the 2018 NFL Scouting Combine, with 19 selected in the 2018 NFL draft.

== Game results ==
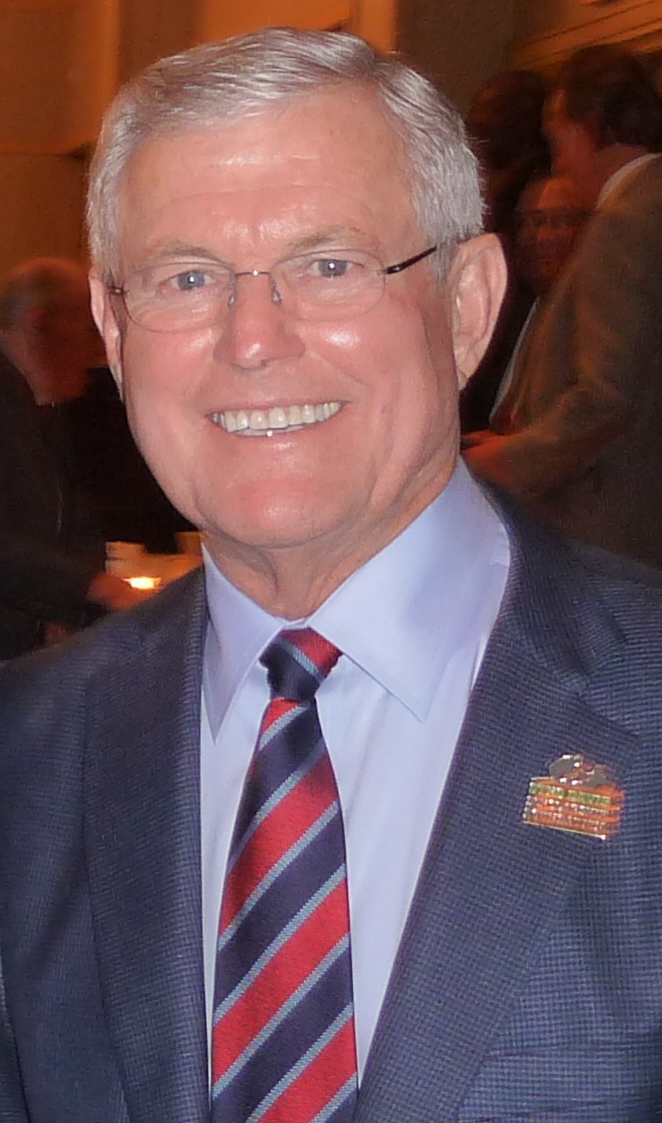
Dick Vermeil led the National team to victory three times.

Through the 2023 playing of the game, the National team leads the series, 9–2. Coach and score of the winning team are in bold font.

Date	National team		American team		Box score	Rosters	Video	Ref.
Date	Coach	Score		Coach	Box score	Rosters	Video	Ref.
January 21, 2012	**Dick Vermeil**	**20**	14	Tom Flores	box	rosters		
January 19, 2013	**Dick Vermeil**	**34**	0	Herman Edwards	box	rosters		
January 18, 2014	**Dick Vermeil**	**31**	17	Dennis Green	box	rosters		
January 17, 2015	**Mike Martz**	**17**	0	Mike Holmgren	box	rosters	video	
January 23, 2016	**Mike Martz**	**18**	17	Mike Holmgren	box	rosters	video	
January 21, 2017	**Mike Martz**	**27**	7	Jim Zorn	box	rosters	video	
January 20, 2018	**Mike Martz**	**23**	0	Darrell Green	box	rosters	video	
January 19, 2019	Mike Tice	7	**10**	**Chuck Pagano**	box	rosters	video	
January 18, 2020	**Marvin Lewis**	**30**	20	Hue Jackson	box	rosters	video	
2021	Canceled due to COVID-19 pandemic							
January 29, 2022	**Marvin Lewis**	**25**	24	Jeff Fisher	box	rosters	video	
January 28, 2023	Eddie George	17	**19**	**Jeff Fisher**	box	rosters	video	

=== MVPs ===
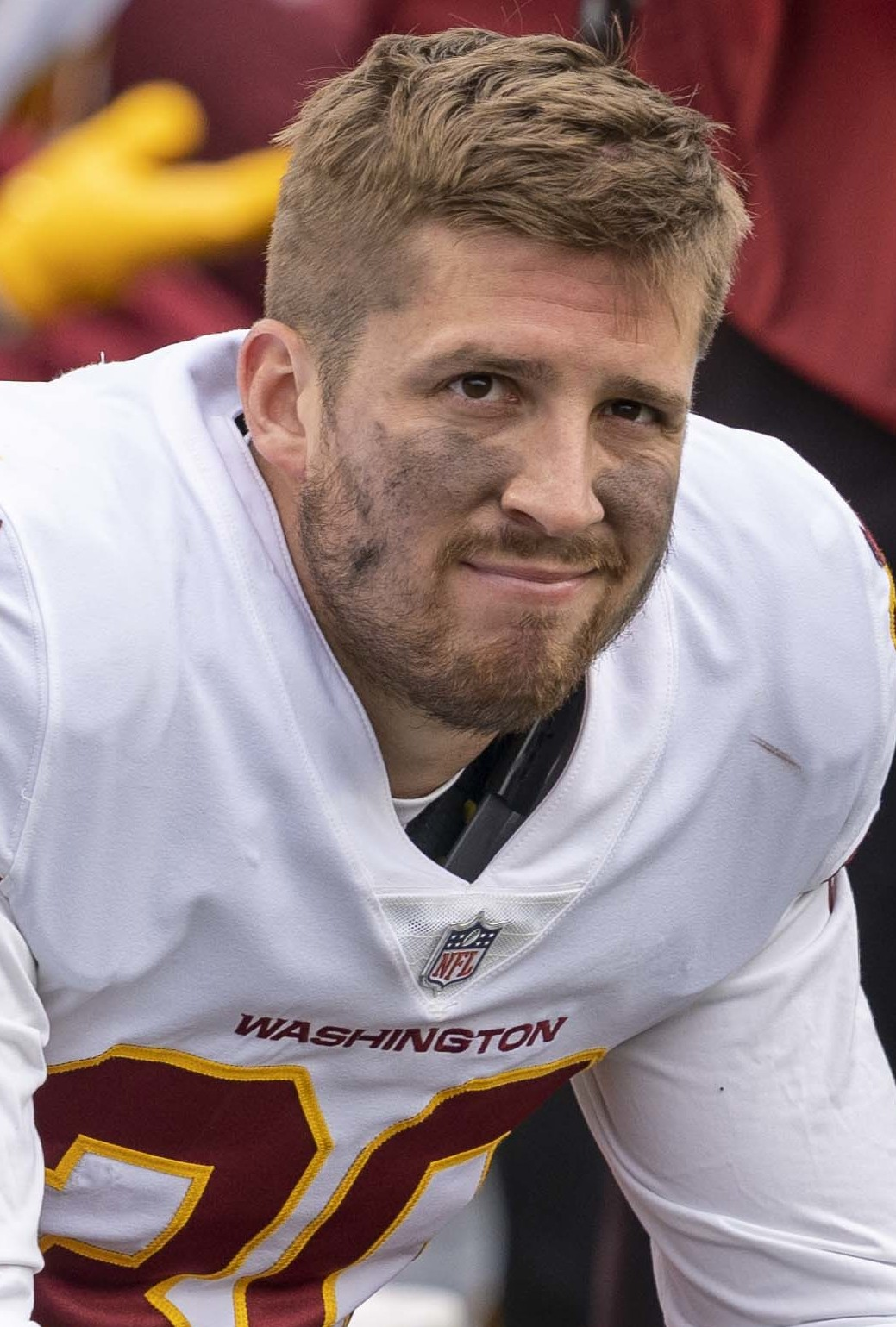
Troy Apke was MVP of the 2018 game.

Year	Name	Position	College team
2012	G. J. Kinne	QB	Tulsa
2013	Dayne Crist	QB	Kansas
2014	J. C. Copeland	RB	LSU
2015	Terrell Watson	RB	Azusa Pacific (D-II)
2016	Andrew Baggett	K	Missouri
2017	Lorenzo Jerome	S	Saint Francis (FCS)
2018	Troy Apke	DB	Penn State
2019	Wes Hills	RB	Slippery Rock (D-II)
2020	Nick Tiano	QB	Chattanooga (FCS)
2022	Cole Kelley	QB	SE Louisiana (FCS)
2023	Holton Ahlers	QB	East Carolina

== Broadcasting ==
In 2012, the inaugural NFLPA Collegiate Bowl was broadcast on the NBC Sports Network. In December 2012, the NFLPA and ESPN signed a multiyear agreement to air the game on the ESPN network. The 2013 game was broadcast on ESPN2 and, as part of the agreement, some of the practices leading up to the event were aired on ESPNU. ESPN continued as the broadcaster through the 2016 game. In 2017, the game moved to Fox Sports 1. In 2020, it moved to the NFL Network, the first game in an agreement to run through the 2024 edition.

== See also ==
- List of college bowl games
