= 1941 Penn State Nittany Lions football team =

American college football season

1941 Penn State Nittany Lions football
- Conference: Independent
- Record: 7–2
- Head coach: Bob Higgins (12th season)
- Captain: Lenny Krouse
- Home stadium: New Beaver Field

1941 Eastern college football independents records
	Conf.			Overall
Team	W	L	T	W		L		T
No. 8 Duquesne		–		8	–	0	–	0
Thiel		–		7	–	0	–	0
Saint Francis (PA)		–		6	–	0	–	1
No. 6 Fordham		–		8	–	1	–	0
Rochester		–		6	–	1	–	0
Trinity (CT)		–		6	–	1	–	0
Wagner		–		5	–	1	–	0
Franklin & Marshall		–		5	–	1	–	1
Penn State		–		7	–	2	–	0
Temple		–		7	–	2	–	0
Coast Guard		–		6	–	2	–	0
Norwich		–		6	–	2	–	0
Hofstra		–		5	–	2	–	0
Boston College		–		7	–	3	–	0
Syracuse		–		5	–	2	–	1
Bucknell		–		6	–	3	–	0
Drexel		–		4	–	2	–	1
Boston University		–		5	–	3	–	0
La Salle		–		5	–	3	–	0
Tufts		–		5	–	3	–	0
Army		–		5	–	3	–	1
CCNY		–		4	–	4	–	0
Villanova		–		4	–	4	–	0
Manhattan		–		4	–	4	–	1
Holy Cross		–		4	–	4	–	2
Colgate		–		3	–	3	–	2
Providence		–		3	–	3	–	2
Buffalo		–		3	–	4	–	1
Massachusetts State		–		3	–	4	–	1
Pittsburgh		–		3	–	6	–	0
Vermont		–		2	–	6	–	0
NYU		–		2	–	7	–	0
Carnegie Tech		–		1	–	7	–	0
Rankings from AP Poll

The 1941 Penn State Nittany Lions football team was an American football team that represented the Pennsylvania State College as an independent during the 1941 college football season. In its 12th season under head coach Bob Higgins, the team compiled a 7–2 record and outscored opponents by a total of 200 to 78.

Penn State's Len Krouse was selected by the Associated Press as a second-team back on the 1941 All-Eastern football team.

Penn State was ranked at No. 41 (out of 681 teams) in the final rankings under the Litkenhous Difference by Score System for 1941.

The team played its home games in New Beaver Field in State College, Pennsylvania.

== Schedule ==
Date	Opponent	Site	Result	Attendance	Source
October 4	at Colgate	Civic Stadium; Buffalo, NY	L 0–7	13,000	
October 11	Bucknell^{†}	New Beaver Field; State College, PA	W 27–13	16,000	
October 18	at Temple	Temple Stadium; Philadelphia, PA	L 0–14	25,000	
October 25	Lehigh	New Beaver Field; State College, PA	W 40–6	12,000	
October 31	at NYU	Polo Grounds; New York, NY	W 42–0	10,691	
November 8	No. 18 Syracuse	New Beaver Field; State College, PA (rivalry)	W 34–19	16,000	
November 15	West Virginia	New Beaver Field; State College, PA (rivalry)	W 7–0	11,000	
November 22	at Pittsburgh	Pitt Stadium; Pittsburgh, PA (rivalry)	W 31–7	33,000	
November 29	at South Carolina	Carolina Stadium; Columbia, SC	W 19–12	12,000	
^{†}Homecoming; Rankings from AP Poll released prior to the game
