= Pat Hanley =

American football player and coach (1896–1966)

Biographical details
- Born: August 21, 1896; Cloquet, Minnesota, U.S.
- Died: July 20, 1966 (aged 69); Berkeley, California, U.S.

Playing career
- 1916–1917 1918: Washington State; Mare Island Marines
- Position: End

Coaching career (HC unless noted)
- 1921: Hillyard HS (WA)
- 1922: Stockton HS (CA)
- 1923–1926: Haskell Institute (line)
- 1927–1933: Northwestern (line)
- 1934–1941: Boston University

Head coaching record
- Overall: 35–24–5 (NCAA); 13–2–1 (High school)
- Military career
- Burial place: Golden Gate National Cemetery; San Bruno, California, U.S.
- Relatives: Lt. Col. Dick Hanley (brother)
- Allegiance: United States of America
- Branch: United States Marine Corps
- Service years: 1917–1918; 1942–1947
- Rank: Lieutenant colonel
- Unit: 4th Marine Division
- Conflicts: World War II: Guadalcanal campaign; Battle of Saipan
- Awards: Bronze Star; Silver Star

Leroy Bernard "Pat" Hanley (August 21, 1896 – July 20, 1966) was an American football player and coach. He served as the head football coach at Boston University from 1934 to 1941, compiling a record of 35–24–5.

== Playing ==
Hanley was born in Cloquet, Minnesota and grew up in Spokane, Washington. He played college football at Washington State University as an end from 1916 to 1917, alongside his brother, Dick Hanley. In 1918, he played under his college coach, William Henry Dietz, on the Mare Island Marines football team.

== Coaching ==
Hanley was the head coach of Hillyard High School in 1921, where he led a team that had not won a game in seven years to an 8–0 record. The following year he moved to California, where he coached Stockton High School to a 5–2–1 record. Hanley then spent 11 years an assistant under his brother at Haskell Institute and at Northwestern University. In 1934 he was named head football coach at Boston University.

== World War II ==
On January 11, 1942, Hanley, a major in the United States Marine Corps Reserve, was ordered to active duty. After a reorientation program at Marine Corps Base Quantico, Hanley was assigned to the 1st Division of the Fleet Marine Force at Marine Corps Air Station New River. He was the base's public relations and moral officer. He fought in the Guadalcanal campaign and was promoted to lieutenant colonel later in 1943. In 1944, he was a recreation and morale officer with the 4th Marine Division. On June 16, 1944, during the Battle of Saipan, Hanley and two others extinguished an explosive-laden vehicle that was threatening to destroy a beach command post. Hanley was awarded the Bronze Star Medal and the Silver Star for his actions.

== Later life ==
After the war, Hanley was in charge of a Special Services program in the Western United States. He left the Marine Corps in 1947 and married his assistant, Eileen Twohey. He spent his later life in Berkeley, California, where he died on July 20, 1966.

== Head coaching record ==
Year	Team	Overall	Conference	Standing	Bowl/playoffs
Boston University Terriers (Independent) (1934–1941)
1934	Boston University	3–4			
1935	Boston University	3–4–2			
1936	Boston University	5–1–2			
1937	Boston University	6–2			
1938	Boston University	3–4–1			
1939	Boston University	5–3			
1940	Boston University	5–3			
1941	Boston University	5–3			
Boston University:		35–24–5			
Total:		35–24–5			
