= 1941 New Hampshire Wildcats football team =

American college football season

1941 New Hampshire Wildcats football
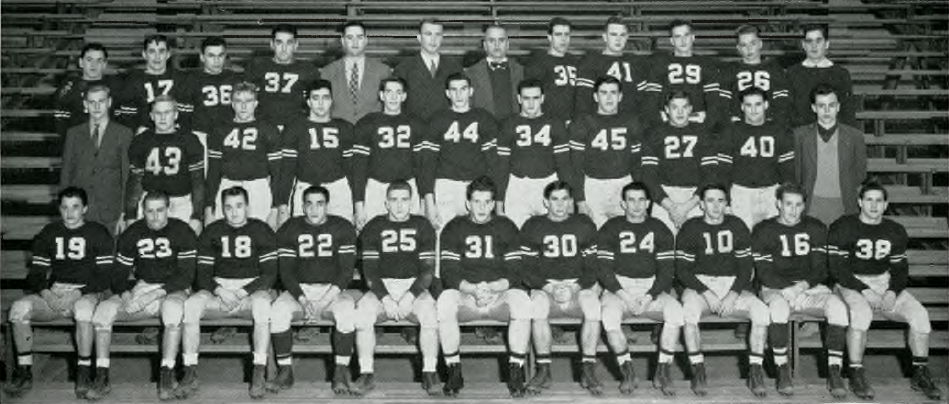
- Conference: New England Conference
- Record: 4–3–1 (0–0–1 New England)
- Head coach: George Sauer (5th season)
- Captain: Richard "Joe" Gordon
- Home stadium: Lewis Field

1941 New England Conference football standings
	Conf.					Overall
Team	W		L		T	W		L		T
Rhode Island State $	2	–	0	–	0	5	–	2	–	1
Maine	2	–	1	–	1	3	–	2	–	2
New Hampshire	0	–	0	–	1	4	–	3	–	1
Northeastern	0	–	1	–	0	4	–	3	–	0
Connecticut	0	–	2	–	0	2	–	6	–	0
$ – Conference champion

The 1941 New Hampshire Wildcats football team was an American football team that represented the University of New Hampshire as a member of the New England Conference during the 1941 college football season. In its fifth year under head coach George Sauer, the team compiled a 4–3–1 record, outscoring their opponents 153–62.

New Hampshire was ranked at No. 226 (out of 681 teams) in the final rankings under the Litkenhous Difference by Score System.

The team played its home games at Lewis Field (also known as Lewis Stadium) in Durham, New Hampshire.

Due to World War II, the next time the Wildcats would play an eight-game season would be 1946.

== Schedule ==
Date	Opponent	Site	Result	Attendance	Source
September 27	Lowell Textile* (Note: Lowell Textile is now University of Massachusetts Lowell.)	Lewis Field; Durham, NH	W 53–6		
October 4	at Bates*	Garcelon Field; Lewiston, ME	L 6–7	3,500	
October 11	at Maine	Alumni Field; Orono, ME (rivalry)	T 7–7		
October 18	at Springfield*	Pratt Field; Springfield, MA	W 14–6		
October 25	Vermont*	Lewis Field; Durham, NH	W 40–18		
November 1	Norwich*	Lewis Field; Durham, NH	L 0–6		
November 8	Tufts*^{†}	Lewis Field; Durham, NH	W 33–0	7,000 (Note: 8,000 per The Granite yearbook.)	
November 15	at Boston University*	Nickerson Field (Note: During this era, Boston University played at a Nickerson Field in Weston; this is not the Nickerson Field later used in Boston.); Weston, MA	L 0–12	6,000	
*Non-conference game; ^{†}Homecoming; Source:

The 1941 game remains the last time that the Bates and New Hampshire football programs have met.
