= 1941 Rhode Island State Rams football team =

American college football season

1941 Rhode Island State Rams football

New England Conference champion
- Conference: New England Conference
- Record: 5–2–1 (2–0 New England)
- Head coach: Bill Beck (1st season)
- Home stadium: Meade Stadium

1941 New England Conference football standings
	Conf.					Overall
Team	W		L		T	W		L		T
Rhode Island State $	2	–	0	–	0	5	–	2	–	1
Maine	2	–	1	–	1	3	–	2	–	2
New Hampshire	0	–	0	–	1	4	–	3	–	1
Northeastern	0	–	1	–	0	4	–	3	–	0
Connecticut	0	–	2	–	0	2	–	6	–	0
$ – Conference champion

The 1941 Rhode Island State Rams football team was an American football team that represented Rhode Island State College (later renamed the University of Rhode Island) as a member of the New England Conference during the 1941 college football season. In its first season under head coach Bill Beck, the team compiled a 5–2–1 record (2–0 against conference opponents) and won the New England Conference championship.

Rhode Island State was ranked at No. 266 (out of 681 teams) in the final rankings under the Litkenhous Difference by Score System.

The team played its home games at Meade Stadium in Kingston, Rhode Island.

== Schedule ==
Date	Opponent	Site	Result	Attendance	Source
September 20	at Coast Guard*	New London, CT	L 0–38		
September 27	at Maine	Orono, ME	W 20–14		
October 4	Lowell Textile*	Meade Stadium; Kingston, RI	W 39–0		
October 11	at Brown*	Brown Stadium; Providence, RI (rivalry)	L 7–14	18,000	
October 18	Massachusetts State*	Meade Stadium; Kingston, RI	W 34–6		
October 22	at Providence*	LaSalle Field; Providence, RI	T 0–0	12,000	
November 1	at Worcester Tech*	Worcester, MA	W 6–0		
November 8	Connecticut	Meade Stadium; Kingston, RI (rivalry)	W 6–0	4,000	
*Non-conference game
