= 1941 Niagara Purple Eagles football team =

American college football season

1941 Niagara Purple Eagles football

Little Three co-champion
- Conference: Western New York Little Three Conference
- Record: 2–5–1 (1–1 Little Three)
- Head coach: Joe Bach (5th season)

The 1941 Niagara Purple Eagles football team was represented Niagara University as a member of the Western New York Little Three Conference (Little Three) during the 1941 college football season. Led by Joe Bach in his fifth and final season, the Purple Eagles compiled an overall record of 2–5–1 record with a mark of 1–1 in conference play, sharing the Little Three title with Canisius and St. Bonaventure

== Schedule ==
Date	Opponent	Site	Result	Attendance	Source
	Saint Vincent*	Niagara Falls, NY	L 0–6		
September 26	at Duquesne*	Forbes Field; Pittsburgh, PA	L 0–33	11,000	
October 5	at Canisius	Buffalo, NY	L 6–16		
October 12	at La Salle*	McCarthy Stadium; Philadelphia, PA	L 0–21	6,000	
October 19	St. Bonaventure	Niagara Falls, NY	W 13–0		
November 2	at Xavier*	Xavier Stadium; Cincinnati, OH	L 0–20	8,000	
November 9	Providence*	Niagara Falls, NY	W 11–0		
	at Scranton*	Scranton, PA	T 7–7		
*Non-conference game
