= 1941 Maine Black Bears football team =

American college football season

1941 Maine Black Bears football
- Conference: Maine Intercollegiate Athletic Conference, New England Conference
- Record: 3–2–2 (1–1–1 MIAC, 2–1–1 New England)
- Head coach: George E. Allen (1st season)
- Captain: Edward Barrows
- Home stadium: Alumni Field

1941 Maine Intercollegiate Athletic Conference football standings
	Conf.					Overall
Team	W		L		T	W		L		T
Bates $	2	–	0	–	0	3	–	4	–	0
Colby	1	–	0	–	1	4	–	2	–	1
Maine	1	–	1	–	1	3	–	2	–	2
Bowdoin	0	–	3	–	0	1	–	6	–	0
+ – Conference co-champions

1941 New England Conference football standings
	Conf.					Overall
Team	W		L		T	W		L		T
Rhode Island State $	2	–	0	–	0	5	–	2	–	1
Maine	2	–	1	–	1	3	–	2	–	2
New Hampshire	0	–	0	–	1	4	–	3	–	1
Northeastern	0	–	1	–	0	4	–	3	–	0
Connecticut	0	–	2	–	0	2	–	6	–	0
$ – Conference champion

The 1941 Maine Black Bears football team was an American football team that represented the University of Maine as a member of the Maine Intercollegiate Athletic Conference (MIAC) and the New England Conference during the 1941 college football season. The team compiled an overall record of 3–2–2 with marks of 1–1–1 against MIAC opponents and 2–1–1 in New England Conference play. The team played its home games at Alumni Field in Orono, Maine.

George E. "Eck" Allen was hired as Maine's head football coach in January 1941. He replaced Fred Brice who resigned from the post after the 1940 season. Bill Kenyon and Bill Dobbs were assistant coaches. Fullback Edward Barrows, the son of former Maine Governor Lewis O. Barrows, was Maine's 1941 team captain.

== Schedule ==
Date	Opponent	Site	Result	Attendance	Source
September 27	Rhode Island State	Alumni Field; Orono ME	L 13–20	6,500	
October 4	Northeastern	Alumni Field; Orono, ME	W 14–12		
October 11	New Hampshire	Alumni Field; Orono, ME (rivalry)	T 7–7		
October 18	at Connecticut	Gardner Dow Athletic Fields; Storrs, CT	W 14–13		
October 25	at Bates	Lewiston, ME	L 6–13		
November 1	at Colby	Waterville, ME	T 13–13		
November 8	Bowdoin	Alumni Field; Orono, ME	W 19–14	> 10,000	
