= Edward Baker (American football) =

American football player and coach

Biographical details
- Born: c. 1909
- Died: December 22, 1959 (aged 50); Pittsburgh, Pennsylvania, U.S.

Playing career

Football
- 1928–1930: Pittsburgh

Baseball
- 1933–1934: Harrisburg Senators
- 1933–1934: New Bedford Whalers
- 1934: Hartford Senators
- Positions: Quarterback (football); Shortstop (baseball)

Coaching career (HC unless noted)

Football
- ?–1936: Pittsburgh (backfield)
- 1937–1939: Carnegie Tech (assistant)
- 1940–1942: Carnegie Tech
- 1949–1959: Carnegie Tech

Head coaching record
- Overall: 65–38–4

Accomplishments and honors

Awards
- Third-team All-American (1930)

Edward Baker (c. 1909 – December 22, 1959) was an American football player and coach. He served as the head football coach at Carnegie Institute of Technology—now known as Carnegie Mellon University—from 1940 to 1942 and from 1949 to 1959. As a college football player, Baker was a three-time letter winner for the University of Pittsburgh. He also played Minor League Baseball. Baker died at the age of 50, on December 22, 1959, at South Side Hospital in Pittsburgh, Pennsylvania, after having has surgery six days earlier for an intestinal obstruction. In additional to coaching, he also practiced dentistry.

== Head coaching record ==
| Year | Team | Overall | Conference | Standing | Bowl/playoffs |
|---|---|---|---|---|---|
Carnegie Tech Tartans (Independent) (1940–1942)
| 1940 | Carnegie Tech | 3–5 | | | |
| 1941 | Carnegie Tech | 1–7 | | | |
| 1942 | Carnegie Tech | 3–3 | | | |
Carnegie Tech Tartans (Independent) (1949–1957)
| 1949 | Carnegie Tech | 4–3–1 | | | |
| 1950 | Carnegie Tech | 7–1 | | | |
| 1951 | Carnegie Tech | 6–2 | | | |
| 1952 | Carnegie Tech | 4–3 | | | |
| 1953 | Carnegie Tech | 5–3 | | | |
| 1954 | Carnegie Tech | 7–0–1 | | | |
| 1955 | Carnegie Tech | 5–1–1 | | | |
| 1956 | Carnegie Tech | 3–5 | | | |
| 1957 | Carnegie Tech | 4–2–1 | | | |
Carnegie Tech Tartans (West Penn Conference) (1958–1959)
| 1958 | Carnegie Tech | 6–2 | 1–1 | 4th | |
| 1959 | Carnegie Tech | 7–1 | 3–1 | 2nd | |
| Carnegie Tech: | | 65–38–4 | 4–2 | | |
| Total: | | 65–38–4 | | | |
