= Lorenzo Jerome =

American football player (born 1995)

Profile
- Position: Free safety

Personal information
- Born: January 20, 1995 (age 31); Sunrise, Florida
- Listed height: 5 ft 10 in (1.78 m)
- Listed weight: 204 lb (93 kg)

Career information
- High school: J. P. Taravella (Coral Springs, Florida)
- College: St. Francis
- NFL draft: 2017: undrafted

Career history
- San Francisco 49ers (2017); Seattle Seahawks (2018)*; Calgary Stampeders (2019); Saskatchewan Roughriders (2021)
- * Offseason or practice squad member only

Awards and highlights
- NEC Defensive Rookie of the Year (2013)
- Stats at Pro Football Reference

Lorenzo Jerome (born January 20, 1995) is an American football free safety. He played college football at St. Francis.

== Early life ==
Jerome was a three-year starter at quarterback and defensive back at J.P. Taravella High School.

== College career ==
Jerome started all 11 games his freshman year and was named NEC Defensive Rookie of the Year. As a junior, Jerome was named second-team All-American as a kick returner by STATS FCS. At the conclusion of his senior year, Jerome accepted invitations to play in the January 2017 editions of the NFLPA Collegiate Bowl and Senior Bowl, the first player in SFU and NEC history to be invited to those games. He had two interceptions in each all-star game, and a forced fumble in the Senior Bowl. He was named the MVP of the NFLPA Collegiate Bowl. Jerome also became first player in school and conference history to be invited to the NFL Scouting Combine.

== Professional career ==
Pre-draft measurables
Height	Weight	Arm length	Hand span	40-yard dash	10-yard split	20-yard split	20-yard shuttle	Three-cone drill	Bench press
5 ft 10 1/2 in (1.79 m)	204 lb (93 kg)	30 5/8 in (0.78 m)	8 5/8 in (0.22 m)	4.63 s	1.60 s	2.63 s	4.58 s	7.14 s	11 reps
All values from NFL Combine/Pro Day

=== San Francisco 49ers ===
Jerome was signed by the San Francisco 49ers as an undrafted free agent on May 4, 2017. After making the initial 53-man roster, Jerome was waived by the 49ers on October 9, 2017.

=== Seattle Seahawks ===
On July 30, 2018, Jerome signed with the Seattle Seahawks. He was waived on September 1, 2018.

=== Calgary Stampeders ===
Jerome signed with the Calgary Stampeders on January 8, 2019. After the CFL canceled the 2020 season due to the COVID-19 pandemic, Jerome chose to opt-out of his contract with the Stampeders on August 26, 2020.

=== Saskatchewan Roughriders ===
Jerome signed with the Saskatchewan Roughriders on February 9, 2021.
