= 1941 Connecticut Huskies football team =

American college football season

1941 Connecticut Huskies football
- Conference: New England Conference
- Record: 2–6 (0–2 New England)
- Head coach: J. Orlean Christian (8th season)
- Home stadium: Gardner Dow Athletic Fields

1941 New England Conference football standings
	Conf.					Overall
Team	W		L		T	W		L		T
Rhode Island State $	2	–	0	–	0	5	–	2	–	1
Maine	2	–	1	–	1	3	–	2	–	2
New Hampshire	0	–	0	–	1	4	–	3	–	1
Northeastern	0	–	1	–	0	4	–	3	–	0
Connecticut	0	–	2	–	0	2	–	6	–	0
$ – Conference champion

The 1941 Connecticut Huskies football team represented the University of Connecticut in the 1941 college football season. The Huskies were led by eighth-year head coach J. Orlean Christian and completed the season with a record of 2–6.

== Schedule ==
Date	Opponent	Site	Result	Attendance	Source
September 27	Coast Guard*	Gardner Dow Athletic Fields; Storrs, CT	L 0–7		
October 4	at Massachusetts State*	Alumni Field; Amherst, MA (rivalry)	L 6–8		
October 11	at Wesleyan*	Andrus Field; Middletown, CT	L 0–7		
October 18	Maine	Gardner Dow Athletic Fields; Storrs, CT	L 13–14		
October 25	at Springfield*	Springfield, MA	W 25–8		
November 1	Middlebury*	Gardner Dow Athletic Fields; Storrs, CT	W 7–0		
November 8	at Rhode Island State	Meade Stadium; Kingston, RI (rivalry)	L 0–6	4,000	
November 15	at Rutgers*	Rutgers Stadium; New Brunswick, NJ	L 7–32	10,500	
*Non-conference game
