= 1942 Sugar Bowl =

American college football game

- 8th Sugar Bowl
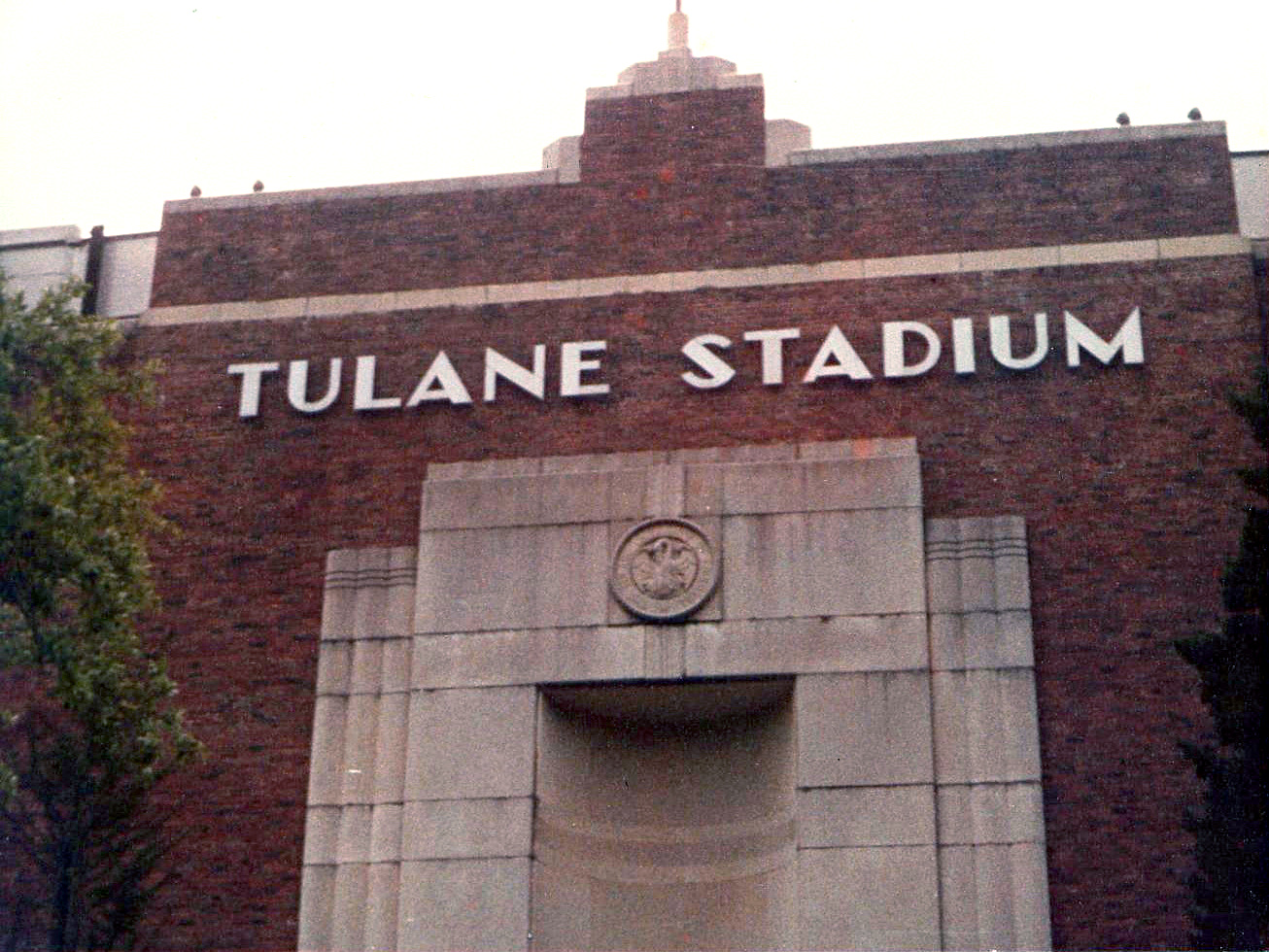
- Tulane Stadium in New Orleans, Louisiana, hosted the Sugar Bowl.
Fordham Rams	Missouri Tigers
(7–1)	(8–1)
Independent	Big Six
2	0
Head coach: Jim Crowley	Head coach: Don Faurot
AP 6	AP 7
	1	2	3	4	Total
Fordham	2	0	0	0	2
Missouri	0	0	0	0	0
- Date: January 1, 1942
- Season: 1941
- Stadium: Tulane Stadium
- Location: New Orleans, Louisiana
- Favorite: Missouri
- Referee: William Halloran
- Attendance: 66,154

The 1942 edition of the Sugar Bowl featured the Missouri Tigers and the Fordham Rams. It was played at Tulane Stadium on New Orleans, Louisiana, on Thursday, January 1, 1942.

Those who watched the game were concerned by the entry of the United States into World War II following the attack on Pearl Harbor, which had occurred less than four weeks earlier. Despite this, the bowl game was played on schedule on New Year's Day 1942.

The game was played in a cold, driving rainstorm. During the first quarter, a blocked Tigers punt, turned back by Fordham tackle Alex Santilli, led to a two-point safety being scored by defensive end Stanley Ritinski. Nearly a touchdown, the referee ruled that the ball was not under control until after Ritinski slid over the end line.

As the rain continued, no further points were scored. The final score was Fordham 2, Missouri 0, the lowest possible combined point total for an untied American football game, which stands as a bowl game record for an untied game as of 2022 (there have been four scoreless ties). Fordham also won the game without a single forward pass completion; their total yardage was 137 yards, all gained on the ground.

The radio broadcast of the game was carried by the NBC Blue Network.

== Statistics ==
Statistics	Fordham	Missouri
First downs	10	8
Yards rushing	137	148
Yards passing	0	21
Total yards	137	169
Punts-Average	9-34.0	6-36.0
Fumbles lost	1	2
Interceptions	0	2
Penalties-Yards	3-30	1-10
