= 1941 college football rankings =

- Season: 1941
- Bowl season: 1941–42 bowl games
- End of season champions: Minnesota (Note: per AP poll, Boand System, Dunkel System, Helms Athletic Foundation, Litkenhous Ratings, Poling System, Billingsley Report, College Football Researchers Association, DeVold System, National Championship Foundation, Sagarin Ratings Elo chess method, Sagarin Ratings Predictor method); Alabama (Note: per Houlgate System); Texas (Note: per Williamson System and Berryman QPRS) (not claimed)

Several major systems have determined the 1941 college football rankings. Unlike most sports, college football's governing body, the NCAA, did not itself bestow a national championship.

== Champions (by ranking) ==
The AP poll and most other methods rank Minnesota as the national champion. One method ranks Alabama and two rank Texas.

- AP poll: Minnesota
- Berryman QPRS: Texas
- Billingsley Report: Minnesota
- Boand System: Minnesota
- College Football Researchers Association:
- DeVold System: Minnesota
- Dunkel System: Minnesota
- Helms Athletic Foundation: Minnesota
- Houlgate System: Alabama
- Litkenhous Ratings: Minnesota
- National Championship Foundation: Minnesota
- Poling System: Minnesota
- Sagarin Ratings Elo chess method: Minnesota
- Sagarin Ratings Predictor method: Minnesota
- Williamson System: Texas

Note: AP Poll, Boand System, Dunkel System, Helms Athletic Foundation, Houlgate System, Litkenhous Ratings, Poling System, and Williamson System were given contemporarily. All other methods were given retroactively.

== AP Poll ==
=== Legend ===
	Increase in ranking
	Decrease in ranking
	Not ranked previous week
	National champion
(#–#)	Win–loss record
(Italics)	Number of first place votes
т	Tied with team above or below also with this symbol

The final AP Poll was released on December 1, at the end of the 1941 regular season, weeks before the major bowls. The AP would not release a post-bowl season final poll regularly until 1968.

	Week 1 Oct 13	Week 2 Oct 20	Week 3 Oct 27	Week 4 Nov 3	Week 5 Nov 10	Week 6 Nov 17	Week 7 Nov 24	Week 8 (Final) Dec 1	
1.	Minnesota (2–0) (66)	Minnesota (3–0) (69)	Minnesota (4–0) (60) т	Texas (6–0) (73.5)	Minnesota (6–0) (99)	Minnesota (7–0) (112)	Minnesota (8–0) (95)	Minnesota (8–0) (84.5)	1.
2.	Texas (3–0) (30)	Texas (4–0) (33)	Texas (5–0) (53) т	Minnesota (5–0) (34.5)	Texas (6–0–1) (4)	Texas A&M (8–0) (5)	Texas A&M (8–0) (2)	Duke (9–0) (9.5)	2.
3.	Duke (3–0) (14)	Michigan (4–0) (7)	Fordham (4–0) (7)	Fordham (5–0) (6)	Duke (7–0) (11)	Duke (8–0) (12)	Duke (9–0) (15)	Notre Dame (8–0–1)	3.
4.	Fordham (2–0)	Duke (4–0) (7)	Duke (5–0) (5)	Duke (6–0) (7)	Texas A&M (7–0) (6)	Notre Dame (7–0–1)	Notre Dame (8–0–1) (2)	Texas (7–1–1) (1)	4.
5.	Northwestern (2–0) (1)	Navy (4–0) (3)	Texas A&M (5–0)	Texas A&M (6–0)	Notre Dame (6–0–1)	Michigan (6–1)	Duquesne (8–0)	Michigan (6–1–1)	5.
6.	Michigan (3–0) (1)	Fordham (3–0)	Notre Dame (5–0)	Navy (5–0–1)	Stanford (6–1) (1)	Duquesne (8–0)	Michigan (6–1–1)	Fordham (7–1)	6.
7.	Navy (3–0) (3)	Notre Dame (4–0)	Michigan (4–1)	Notre Dame (5–0–1)	Michigan (5–1)	Alabama (7–1)	Missouri (8–1) (1)	Missouri (8–1) (1)	7.
8.	Notre Dame (3–0)	Santa Clara (4–0)	Penn (4–0) (1)	Michigan (5–1)	Northwestern (4–2)	Missouri (7–1)	Fordham (6–1)	Duquesne (8–0)	8.
9.	Santa Clara (3–0) (1)	Texas A&M (4–0)	Northwestern (3–1)	Stanford (5–1)	Alabama (6–1)	Texas (6–1–1)	Northwestern (5–3)	Texas A&M (8–1)	9.
10.	Ohio State (2–0) (1)	Tulane (3–1) (1)	Vanderbilt (5–0)	Northwestern (3–2)	Duquesne (7–0)	Northwestern (4–3)	Texas (6–1–1)	Navy (7–1–1)	10.
11.	Penn (2–0)	Ohio State (3–0) (1)	Navy (4–0–1)	Army (4–0–1)	Fordham (5–1)	Fordham (5–1)	Navy (6–1–1)	Northwestern (5–3)	11.
12.	Rice (2–0)	Penn (3–0)	Stanford (4–1)	Duquesne (6–0)	Navy (5–1–1)	Navy (5–1–1)	Vanderbilt (8–1)	Oregon State (7–2)	12.
13.	Clemson (4–0) (1)	Northwestern (2–1)	Temple (5–0)	Alabama (5–1)	Mississippi State (5–0–1) (0.5)	Penn (6–1)	Penn (7–1)	Ohio State (6–1–1)	13.
14.	Texas A&M (3–0)	Clemson (4–0) (3)	Army (4–0)	Tulane (4–2)	Penn (5–1)	Ohio State (6–1)	Ole Miss (6–1–1)	Georgia (8–1–1)	14.
15.	Nebraska (2–0)	Vanderbilt (4–0)	Alabama (4–1)	Mississippi State (4–0–1)	Ole Miss (5–1–1) (0.5)	Ole Miss (5–1–1)	Ohio State (6–1–1)	Penn (7–1)	15.
16.	Oregon State (3–0)	Oregon (3–1)	Duquesne (5–0)	Ole Miss (4–1–1)	Missouri (6–1)	Oregon State (5–2)	Clemson (7–1)	Mississippi State (7–1–1)	16.
17.	Tulane (2–1) (1)	Temple (4–0)	Ole Miss (3–1–1) т	Missouri (5–1)	Harvard (3–2–1)	Stanford (6–2)	Oregon State (6–2)	Ole Miss (6–2–1)	17.
18.	Vanderbilt (3–0)	Oregon State (3–1)	Mississippi State (3–0–1) т	Syracuse (5–1)	Boston College (5–2)	Clemson (6–1)	Alabama (7–2)	Tennessee (8–2)	18.
19.	Mississippi State (2–0–1)	Stanford (3–1) т	Missouri (4–1)	Penn (4–1)	Army (4–1–1)	TCU (6–2)	Harvard (5–2–1)	Washington State (6–3)	19.
20.	Columbia (2–0)	Villanova (3–0) т	SMU (3–1)	Ohio State (4–1)	Ohio State (5–1)	Georgia (6–1–1) т; Washington (5–3) т	Georgia (7–1–1)	Alabama (8–2)	20.
	Week 1 Oct 13	Week 2 Oct 20	Week 3 Oct 27	Week 4 Nov 3	Week 5 Nov 10	Week 6 Nov 17	Week 7 Nov 24	Week 8 (Final) Dec 1	
		Dropped: Columbia; Mississippi State; Nebraska; Rice	Dropped: Clemson; Ohio State; Oregon; Oregon State; Santa Clara; Tulane; Villanova	Dropped: SMU; Temple; Vanderbilt	Dropped: Syracuse; Tulane	Dropped: Army; Boston College; Harvard; Mississippi State	Dropped: Stanford; TCU; Washington	Dropped: Clemson; Harvard; Vanderbilt	

== Boand System ==
The Boand System rankings (also known as "Azzi Ratem") released after games played on November 29 were as follows:

1. Minnesota (81.6)
2. Navy (80.3)
3. Notre Dame (79.4)
4. Texas (78.9)
5. Penn (77.6)
6. Duke (77.5)
7. Duquesne (77.4)
8. Michigan (78.8)
9. Missouri (76.4)
10. Texas A&M (76.3)
11. Ohio State (75.6)
12. Alabama (74.6)
13. Georgia (74.5)
14. Fordham (73.7)
15. TCU (73.4)
16. Tennessee (73.3)
17. Mississippi State (73.2)
18. Oregon State (72.7)
19. Northwestern (72.6)
20. Harvard (72.0)

== Dunkel System ==
The final Dunkel System rankings released in December 1941 were as follows:

1. Minnesota (100.7)
2. Duke (98.5)
3. Texas (94.5)
4. Georgia (93.4)
5. Tennessee (92.6)
6. Michigan (92.4)
7. Northwestern (92.2)
8. Missouri (92.1)
9. Texas A&M (92.1)
10. Duquesne (91)
11. Notre Dame (90.2)
12. Alabama (89.5)
13. Penn (89.1)
14. Navy (88.9)
15. TCU (88.9)
16. Washington State (88.5)
17. Oregon State (88.2)
18. SMU (88.2)
19. Rice (88.1)
20. Vanderbilt (88.1)
21.
22. Ohio State (87.4)
23. Mississippi State (87)
24.
25.
26.
27. Ole Miss (86)

== Houlgate System ==
The Houlgate System's final selections released in early December 1941 were as follows:

1. Minnesota
2. Navy
3. Alabama
4. Duquesne
5. Notre Dame
6. Michigan
Mississippi State
Texas
9. Duke
10. Pennsylvania
11. Tennessee
12. TCU
13. Georgia
14. Ohio State
Oregon State
Temple
17. Missouri
Texas A&M
Texas Tech
20. Vanderbilt
21. Fordham
22. Boston College
Harvard
24. Virginia
25. Penn State

== Litkenhous Ratings ==
The final Litkenhous Ratings released in December 1941 provided numerical rankings for 681 college football programs. The top 100 ranked teams were:

1. Minnesota
2. Texas
3. Duke
4. Michigan
5. Texas A&M
6. Alabama
7. Notre Dame
8. Navy
9. Northwestern
10. Georgia
11. Tulane
12. Penn
13. Tennessee
14. Vanderbilt
15. Ohio State
16. Missouri
17. Fordham
18. Duquesne
19. Mississippi State
20. Oklahoma
21. Cornell
22. LSU
23. TCU
24. SMU
25. Oregon State
26. Washington State
27. Boston College
28. Stanford
29. Ole Miss
30. Rice
31. Washington
32. Harvard
33. California
34. Syracuse
35. Virginia
36. Santa Clara
37. Colgate
38. Auburn
39. Clemson
40. Georgia Tech
41. Penn State
42. Columbia
43. Michigan State
44. Detroit
45. Army
46. Texas Tech
47. Dartmouth
48. Indiana
49. Arkansas
50. Purdue
51. Iowa
52. Xavier
53. Marshall
54. Oregon
55. Baylor
56. Kentucky
57. Wisconsin
58. Nebraska
59. Villanova
60. Marquette
61. Texas A&I
62. Utah
63. Miami (FL)
64. USC
65. William & Mary
66. Tulsa
67. Florida
68. Temple
69. Hawaii
70. Georgetown
71. Illinois
72. Wake Forest
73. Holy Cross
74. Pittsburgh
75. South Carolina
76. Princeton
77. UCLA
78. Yale
79. Manhattan
80. Dayton
81. Saint Mary's (CA)
82. San Francisco
83. Rollins
84. Chattanooga
85. Western Michigan
86. Denver
87. Arizona
88. Panzer
89. Oklahoma A&M
90. West Virginia
91. West Texas State
92. Cincinnati
93. Hardin–Simmons
94. S.W. Tennessee
95. Lafayette
96. Western Reserve
97. Bradley
98. Brown
99. Willamette
100. North Carolina

== Williamson System ==
The final Williamson System rankings for 1940 were issued in January 1942, after the bowl games.

1. Texas (99.2)
2. Minnesota (97.9)
3. Notre Dame (96.2)
4. Fordham (95.8)
5. Navy (95.6)
6. Missouri (95.4)
7. Michigan (95.1)
8. Penn (94.9)
9. Duquesne (94.7)
10. Mississippi State (94.2)
11. Oregon State (94.1)
12. Alabama (94.0)
13. Duke (93.8)
14. Texas A&M (93.7)
15. Tennessee (93.6)
16. Vanderbilt (93.5)
17. Georgia (93.4)
18. Northwestern (93.2)
19. TCU (93.1)
20. Ohio State (93.0)
21. Ole Miss (92.6)
22. Cornell (92.4)
23. Harvard (92.2)
24. Washington State (91.9)
25. Oklahoma (91.5)
26. LSU (91.2)
27. Rice (91.1)
28. Stanford (91.0)
29. Tulane (90.9)
30. SMU (90.8)
31. Oregon (90.8)
32. Santa Clara (90.7)
33. Auburn (90.6)
34. Washington (90.4)
35. Army (90.1)
36. California (90.0)
37. William & Mary (89.8)
38. Dartmouth (89.7)
39. Clemson (89.6)
40. Tulsa (89.5)
41. Colgate (89.4)
42. Boston College (89.3)
43. Michigan State (89.1)
44. Temple (89.0)
45. Columbia (88.9)
46. Penn State (88.6)
47. Syracuse (88.3)
48. Manhattan (88.2)

== See also ==
- 1941 College Football All-America Team
