= Wagner Seahawks football =

American football team of Wagner College

2026 Wagner Seahawks football team
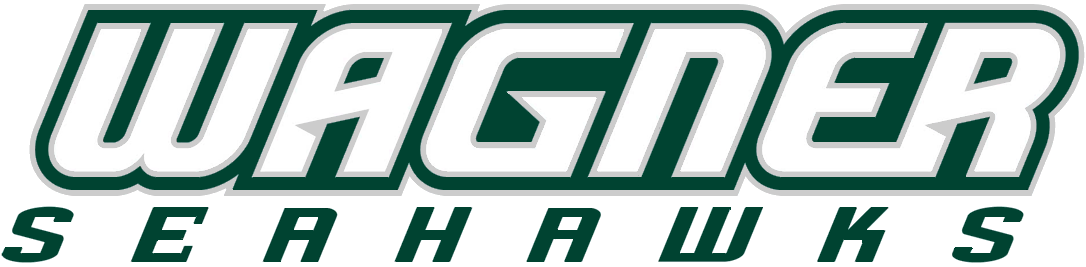
- First season: 1927; 99 years ago
- Athletic director: Walt Hameline
- Head coach: Tom Masella; 6th season, 14–45 (.237)
- Location: Staten Island, New York
- Stadium: Wagner College Stadium (capacity: 4,000)
- NCAA division: Division I FCS
- Conference: NEC
- Colors: Green and white
- All-time record: 428–425–19 (.502)

NCAA Division III championships
- 1987

Conference championships
- NEC: 2012, 2014
- Website: wagnerathletics.com

The Wagner Seahawks football program is the intercollegiate American football team for Wagner College located in the U.S. state of New York. The team competes in the NCAA Division I Football Championship Subdivision (FCS) and are members of the Northeast Conference. Wagner's first football team was fielded in 1927. The team plays its home games at the 3,300 seat Wagner College Stadium in Staten Island, New York. The Seahawks are coached by Tom Masella.

== History ==
=== Classifications ===
- 1956–1972: NCAA College Division
- 1973–1992: NCAA Division III
- 1993–present: NCAA Division I–AA/FCS

=== Conference memberships ===
- 1927: Independent
- 1928–1929: Metropolitan Collegiate Conference
- 1930–1957: Independent
- 1958–1974: Middle Atlantic States Collegiate Athletic Corporation
- 1972–1977: Metropolitan Intercollegiate Conference
- 1978–1991: Division III Independent
- 1992: Liberty Football Conference
- 1993–1995: NCAA Division I–AA Independent
- 1996–present: Northeast Conference

== Championships ==
=== National championships ===
Wagner has made one appearance in the NCAA Division III National Championship Game, defeating Dayton 19–3 in the 1987 championship game. Under head coach Walt Hameline, Wagner won its first championship in school history by dominating St. John's 48–7 in November 1983, avenging one of its only two losses that season. The Seahawks scored the first four times they had the ball in the opening half. The senior class ended their careers as one of the winningest in Wagner history with a four-year record of 34–6–2. This class also played part in Wagner's first-ever NCAA appearance in 1980, and helped establish the foundation to Wagner's rise as a national power in Division III, culminating in a national championship in 1987, and eventual move to NCAA I-AA (now FCS) status.

Year	Coach	Selectors	Record	Bowl
1987	Walt Hameline	NCAA Division III Playoffs	13–1	Won NCAA Division IIII National Championship Game (19–3 over Dayton)

=== Conference championships ===
Wagner has won two conference championships.

Years	Conference	Overall Record	Conference Record
2012†	Northeast Conference	9–4	7–1
2014†	Northeast Conference	7–4	5–1

== Playoffs ==
=== NCAA Division I-AA/FCS ===
The Seahawks have appeared in the FCS playoffs one time with an overall record of 1–1.

Year	Round	Opponent	Result
2012	First Round; Second Round	Colgate; Eastern Washington	W 31–20; L 19–29

=== NCAA Division III ===
The Seahawks have appeared in the Division III playoffs four times with an overall record of 4–3. They were Division III National Champions in 1987.

Year	Round	Opponent	Result
1980	Quarterfinals	Ithaca	L 13–41
1982	Quarterfinals	St. Lawrence	L 34–43
1987	First Round; Quarterfinals; Semifinals; National Championship Game	Rochester; Fordham; Emory & Henry; Dayton	W 38–14; W 21–0; W 20–13; W 19–3
1988	First Round	Ithaca	L 31–34 ^{OT}

== Bowls ==
The Seahawks played in several ECAC Bowls (1983, 1985, 1986, 1992), going 4-0.

== Future non-conference opponents ==
Future non-conference opponents announced as of March 2, 2026.

2026	2027	2028	2029	2030
Southern Connecticut	at Princeton	at UMass		at Buffalo
at James Madison	Lafayette			
at California				
Princeton				
at Merrimack				
