= Saint Francis Red Wolves football =

College football program representing Saint Francis University

- First season: 1892; 134 years ago
- Head coach: Chris Villarrial; 15th season, 68–98 (.410)
- Location: Loretto, Pennsylvania
- Stadium: DeGol Field (capacity: 3,500)
- NCAA division: Division III
- Conference: PAC
- Colors: Red and white
- All-time record: 431–230–12 (.649)

Conference championships
- ACFC: 1991 NEC: 2016, 2022
- Website: SFUathletics.com

The Saint Francis Red Wolves football program represents the intercollegiate football team for Saint Francis University (SFU). Through the 2025 season, the team competed in the NCAA Division I Football Championship Subdivision (FCS) as a member of the Northeast Conference. The school's first football team was fielded in 1892. The team plays its home games at the 3,500-seat DeGol Field. They are coached by Chris Villarrial.

In July 2026, SFU started a transition to NCAA Division III as a new member of the Presidents' Athletic Conference.

== History ==
The team was originally known as the Red Flash, which dates back to 1927, when the school boasted one of the fastest football ground attacks in the east, headed by quarterback George Kunzler, captain and right halfback Ed McLister, fullback Alphonse Abels and left halfback Ralph Bruno. Because the team wore predominantly red uniforms, the fans and The Loretto (the student newspaper) dubbed the team "The Red Flashes."

The nickname quickly spread, first to the football team and later that same season to the basketball team. Within 15 years, "The Red Flashes" evolved into the present form of "The Red Flash," through the efforts of sports publicist Simon "Cy" Bender.

Before The Red Flashes romped on the football field, the school's teams went by a variety of unofficial nicknames, with the most popular being the "Saints." Others were derived from a Franciscan theme, such as the "Franciscans" and "Frannies."

The most popular unofficial nickname also evolved from the Franciscan theme, with its origins dating back to the 1930s. The nickname "Frankies" can be traced as far back as the 1938–39 basketball season, when the name first appeared in The Loretto and the Johnstown Tribune-Democrat. The rise of this nickname can be closely tied to the University's Mr. Frankie Award, given annually to an outstanding senior male, which dates to 1936.

The "Gigity" nickname gained widespread use by fans and the then-college but was discontinued after the 1971–72 season, giving way to the current "Red Flash" moniker. The change coincided with the opening of the Maurice Stokes Athletics Center.

Saint Francis’ athletics tradition dates back to 1867 when a group of students formed a team called the Independent Star-Athletic Association. The team played its first game under the Saint Francis banner in 1888. Gymnastics was established in 1882, while football was first played at Saint Francis University in 1892.

On June 3, 2026, Saint Francis announced they would rebrand from the Red Flash to the Red Wolves for the 2026-27 athletic season, coinciding with their transition to Division III. The new name draws inspiration from the story of the Wolf of Gubbio, one of the most well-known stories surrounding Saint Francis of Assisi and the Franciscans religious order.

=== Classifications ===
The team has participated at the following levels.

- 1892–1950: N/A
  - 1916, 1918, 1920–1921, 1932–1937, 1942–1946, 1954–1968: No team
- 1951–1952: NCAA
- 1953: NCAA College Division
- 1954–1968: No team
- 1969–1972: NCAA College Division
- 1973–1977: N/A
- 1978–1992: NCAA Division III
- 1993–2025: NCAA Division I-AA/FCS
- 2026–present: NCAA Division III

=== Conference memberships ===
The team has been affiliated with the following conferences.

- 1892–1953: Independent
- 1954–1968: No team
- 1969–1977: Independent
- 1978–1988: NCAA Division III independent
- 1989–1991: Atlantic Collegiate Football Conference (NCAA Division III)
- 1992: NCAA Division III Independent
- 1993–1995: NCAA Division I-AA independent
- 1996–2025: Northeast Conference (NCAA Division I-AA/FCS)
- 2026–present: Presidents' Athletic Conference (NCAA Division III)

== Championships ==
=== Conference championships ===
Year	Coach	Conference	Record	Conference record
1991	Frank Pergolizzi	Atlantic Collegiate Football Conference	6–3	3–0
2016†	Chris Villarrial	Northeast Conference	7–5	5–1
2022	Chris Villarrial	Northeast Conference	9–3	7–0

† Co-champions

== Playoff results ==
=== Division I FCS ===
The Red Wolves have appeared in the FCS Playoffs two times. Their record is 0–2.

Year	Round	Opponent	Result
2016	First Round	Villanova	L 21–31
2022	First Round	Delaware	L 17–56

== Notable former players ==
Notable alumni include:

- Tony Bova (1917–1973) played in the NFL 1942–1947
- George Magulick (1919–1955) played in the NFL 1944-1944
- John McCarthy (1916–1998) College football All-American in 1941 at Saint Francis University and played in the NFL 1944-1944
- Archie Milano (1918–1981) played in the NFL 1945-1945
- John Naioti (1921–1990) played in the NFL 1942 and 1945. Served in the military in 1943 and 1944.
- Joe Restic (1926–2011) played in the NFL 1952-1952 and was the head coach of Harvard from 1971 to 1993 with a record of 117–97–6.
- Ed Stofko (1920–1988) played in the NFL 1945-1945. He was drafted as the 85th pick in 1944.
- Lorenzo Jerome, NFL player
