= 1942 NFL draft =

National Football League draft

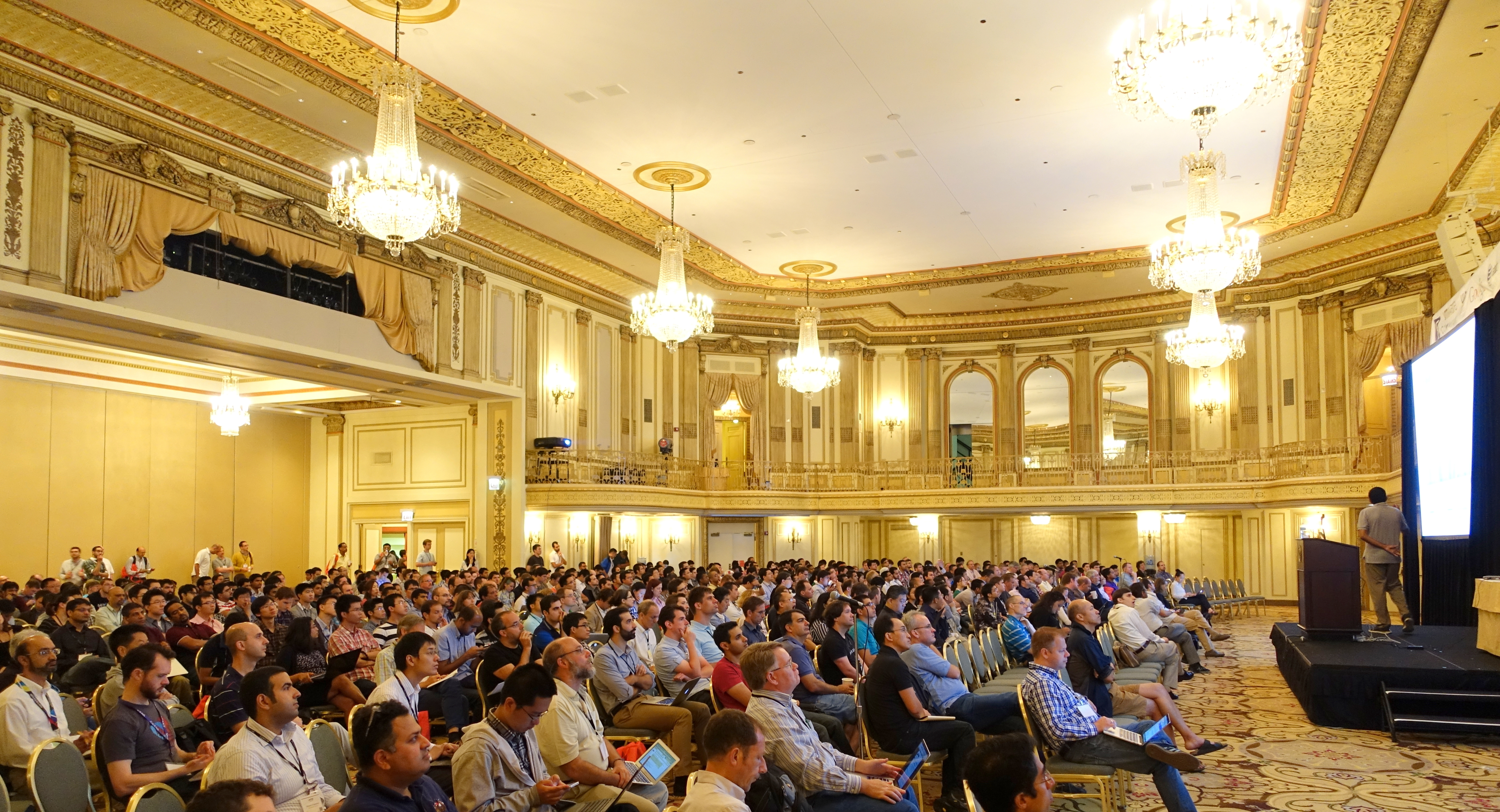
- Ballroom of The Palmer House Hotel (location of the draft), photographed in 2014

General information
- Date: December 22, 1941
- Location: Palmer House Hotel in Chicago, IL

Overview
- 200 total selections in 22 rounds
- League: NFL
- First selection: Bill Dudley, HB; Pittsburgh Steelers
- Most selections (20): each team made 20 picks
- Fewest selections (20): each team made 20 picks
- Hall of Famers: 2: RB Bill Dudley; WR Mac Speedie

The 1942 NFL draft was held on December 22, 1941, at the Palmer House Hotel in Chicago. Two members of the draft class have been inducted into the Pro Football Hall of Fame, Bill Dudley, the first overall selection by the Pittsburgh Steelers, and Mac Speedie, 135th overall selection by the Detroit Lions. Additionally, one member of the draft class became a Naismith Memorial Basketball Hall of Fame college basketball coach, Ralph Miller. Miller was selected 167th pick overall by the Brooklyn Dodgers after successful careers at Kansas on the school's football and basketball teams.

== Player selections ==
	= Hall of Famer
†	= Pro Bowler (Note: Players are identified as a Pro Bowler if they were selected for the Pro Bowl at any time in their career.)

=== Round 1 ===
Pick #	NFL team	Player	Position	College
1	Pittsburgh Steelers	Bill Dudley	Halfback	Virginia
2	Cleveland Rams	Jack Wilson	Halfback	Baylor
3	Philadelphia Eagles	Pete Kmetovic	Halfback	Stanford
4	Chicago Cardinals	Steve Lach	Fullback	Duke
5	Detroit Lions	Bob Westfall	Fullback	Michigan
6	Washington Redskins	Spec Sanders	Halfback	Texas
7	Brooklyn Dodgers	Bobby Robertson	Halfback	USC
8	New York Giants	Merle Hapes	Fullback	Ole Miss
9	Green Bay Packers	Urban Odson	Tackle	Minnesota
10	Chicago Bears	Frankie Albert	Quarterback	Stanford

=== Round 2 ===
Pick #	NFL team	Player	Position	College
11	Pittsburgh Steelers	Vern Martin	Back	Texas
12	Cleveland Rams	Jack "Indian" Jacobs	Back	Oklahoma
13	Philadelphia Eagles	Vic Lindskog	Center	Stanford
14	Chicago Cardinals	Lloyd Cheatham	Back	Auburn
15	Detroit Lions	Alf Bauman	Tackle	Northwestern

=== Round 3 ===
Pick #	NFL team	Player	Position	College
16	Pittsburgh Steelers	Ken Casanega	Back	Santa Clara
17	Cleveland Rams	Roger Eason	Tackle	Oklahoma
18	Philadelphia Eagles	Ted Williams	Back	Boston College
19	Chicago Cardinals	Wilson "Bud" Schwenk	Back	Washington University
20	Detroit Lions	Bob Dethman	Back	Oregon State
21	Washington Redskins	Rufus Deal	Back	Auburn
22	Brooklyn Dodgers	Curt Mecham	Back	Oregon
23	New York Giants	Bob Sweiger	Back	Minnesota
24	Green Bay Packers	Ray Frankowski	Guard	Washington
25	Chicago Bears	Joe Boratyn	Back	Holy Cross

=== Round 4 ===
Pick #	NFL team	Player	Position	College
26	Pittsburgh Steelers	Malcolm Kutner	End	Texas
27	Cleveland Rams	Len Levy	Guard	Minnesota
28	Philadelphia Eagles	Gordon Paschka	Guard	Minnesota
29	Chicago Cardinals	Vince Banonis	Center	Detroit
30	Detroit Lions	Dom "Mickey" Sanzotta	Back	Case Western Reserve

=== Round 5 ===
Pick #	NFL team	Player	Position	College
31	Pittsburgh Steelers	Curt Sandig	Back	St. Mary's (TX)
32	Cleveland Rams	Orville Matthews	Back	Oklahoma
33	Philadelphia Eagles	Ernie Blandin	Tackle	Tulane
34	Chicago Cardinals	Bob Reinhard	Tackle	California
35	Detroit Lions	Joe Blalock	End	Clemson
36	Washington Redskins	Joe Zeno	Guard	Holy Cross
37	Brooklyn Dodgers	Vike Francis	Back	Nebraska
38	New York Giants	Al Blozis	Tackle	Georgetown
39	Green Bay Packers	Bill Green	Back	Iowa
40	Chicago Bears	Martin Ruby	Defensive tackle	Texas A&M

=== Round 6 ===
Pick #	NFL team	Player	Position	College
41	Pittsburgh Steelers	Charley Greene	Tackle	Tulsa
42	Cleveland Rams	Mike Sweeney	End	Texas
43	Philadelphia Eagles	Earl Younglove	End	Washington
44	Chicago Cardinals	Chal Daniel	Guard	Texas
45	Detroit Lions	Murray Evans	Back	Hardin–Simmons
46	Washington Redskins	Harley McCollum	Tackle	Tulane
47	Brooklyn Dodgers	Henry Stanton	End	Arizona
48	New York Giants	Bob Glass	Back	Tulane
49	Green Bay Packers	Joe Krivonak	Guard	South Carolina
50	Chicago Bears	H.C. Burrus	End	Hardin–Simmons

=== Round 7 ===
Pick #	NFL team	Player	Position	College
51	Pittsburgh Steelers	Johnny Butler	Back	Tennessee
52	Cleveland Rams	Italo Rossi	Tackle	Purdue
53	Philadelphia Eagles	Billy Sewell	Back	Washington State
54	Chicago Cardinals	Rupe Thornton	Guard	Santa Clara
55	Detroit Lions	Tommy Colella	Back	Canisius
56	Washington Redskins	Bob Fitch	End	Minnesota
57	Brooklyn Dodgers	Wayne Goldsmith	Back	Emporia State
58	New York Giants	Tommy Prothro	Back	Duke
59	Green Bay Packers	Pres Johnston	Back	SMU
60	Chicago Bears	Bob Jeffries	Guard	Missouri

=== Round 8 ===
Pick #	NFL team	Player	Position	College
61	Pittsburgh Steelers	Floyd Spendlove	Tackle	Utah
62	Cleveland Rams	Bob Brumley	Back	Rice
63	Philadelphia Eagles	Bill Halverson	Guard	Oregon State
64	Chicago Cardinals	Doug Renzel	Back	Marquette
65	Detroit Lions	Joe Franceski	Tackle	Scranton
66	Washington Redskins	George Peters	Back	Oregon State
67	Brooklyn Dodgers	Preston Flanagan	End	Texas
68	New York Giants	Tom Kearns	Tackle	Miami (FL)
69	Green Bay Packers	Joe Rogers	End	Michigan
70	Chicago Bears	Frank Maznicki	Back	Boston College

=== Round 9 ===
Pick #	NFL team	Player	Position	College
71	Pittsburgh Steelers	Rayburn Chase	Back	Missouri
72	Cleveland Rams	Hubert Ulrich	End	Kansas
73	Philadelphia Eagles	Ray Graves	Center	Tennessee
74	Chicago Cardinals	Chet Wetterlund	Back	Illinois Wesleyan
75	Detroit Lions	Emil Banjavic	Back	Arizona
76	Washington Redskins	Frank Swiger	Back	Duke
77	Brooklyn Dodgers	Bob Gifford	Back	Denver
78	New York Giants	Bob Merker	End	Millikin
79	Green Bay Packers	Noah Langdale	Tackle	Alabama
80	Chicago Bears	John Petty	Back	Purdue

=== Round 10 ===
Pick #	NFL team	Player	Position	College
81	Pittsburgh Steelers	Ernie Steele	Back	Washington
82	Cleveland Rams	Bob deLauer	Tackle	USC
83	Philadelphia Eagles	Jack Stackpool	Back	Washington
84	Chicago Cardinals	Jud Ringer	End	Minnesota
85	Detroit Lions	Bill Diehl	Center	Iowa
86	Washington Redskins	John Goodyear	Back	Marquette
87	Brooklyn Dodgers	Joe Petro	Guard	Muhlenberg
88	New York Giants	Mike Kopcik	End	Georgetown
89	Green Bay Packers	Gene Flick	Center	Minnesota
90	Chicago Bears	Noah "Moon" Mullins	Back	Kentucky

=== Round 11 ===
Pick #	NFL team	Player	Position	College
91	Pittsburgh Steelers	Thornley Wood	Back	Columbia
92	Cleveland Rams	Ben Hightower	End	Sam Houston State
93	Philadelphia Eagles	Noble Doss	Back	Texas
94	Chicago Cardinals	Jim Fitzharris	End	St. Thomas (MN)
95	Detroit Lions	John Polanski	Back	Wake Forest
96	Washington Redskins	Al DeMao	Center	Duquesne
97	Brooklyn Dodgers	Fraser "Pat" Donlan	Tackle	Manhattan
98	New York Giants	John Solic	Center	St. Francis (PA)
99	Green Bay Packers	Tom Farris	Back	Wisconsin
100	Chicago Bears	Bill Geyer	Back	Colgate

=== Round 12 ===
Pick #	NFL team	Player	Position	College
101	Pittsburgh Steelers	Bill Roach	End	TCU
102	Cleveland Rams	Walt Zirinsky	Back	Lafayette
103	Philadelphia Eagles	Fred Meyer	End	Stanford
104	Chicago Cardinals	Dick Brye	Tackle	Marquette
105	Detroit Lions	Joe Stringfellow	End	Southern Miss
106	Washington Redskins	Phil Ahwesh	Back	Duquesne
107	Brooklyn Dodgers	Jim Thibaut	Back	Tulane
108	New York Giants	Len Krouse	Back	Penn State
109	Green Bay Packers	Jimmy Richardson	Back	Marquette
110	Chicago Bears	Jim Daniell	Tackle	Ohio State

=== Round 13 ===
Pick #	NFL team	Player	Position	College
111	Pittsburgh Steelers	Wayne Holt	Guard	Tulsa
112	Cleveland Rams	Ray Bradfield	End	Santa Clara
113	Philadelphia Eagles	Bob Brenton	Tackle	Missouri
114	Chicago Cardinals	Charley Givler	Guard	Wake Forest
115	Detroit Lions	Tony Arena	Center	Michigan State
116	Washington Redskins	John Kovatch	End	Notre Dame
117	Brooklyn Dodgers	Art Deremer	Center	Niagara
118	New York Giants	Bob Barnett	Center	Duke
119	Green Bay Packers	Bruce Smith	Halfback	Minnesota
120	Chicago Bears	Jackie Hunt	Back	Marshall

=== Round 14 ===
Pick #	NFL team	Player	Position	College
121	Pittsburgh Steelers	Clure Mosher	Center	Louisville
122	Cleveland Rams	Tom Greene	Tackle	Georgia
123	Philadelphia Eagles	John Wyhonic	Guard	Alabama
124	Chicago Cardinals	Hugh Swink	Tackle	Oklahoma A&M
125	Detroit Lions	Wolf Heinberg	Tackle	UC Santa Barbara
126	Washington Redskins	Bill DeCorrevont	Back	Northwestern
127	Brooklyn Dodgers	Stan Gervelis	End	Pittsburgh
128	New York Giants	Pete Layden	Back	Texas
129	Green Bay Packers	Bill Applegate	Guard	South Carolina
130	Chicago Bears	Henry "Bob" Gude	Center	Vanderbilt

=== Round 15 ===
Pick #	NFL team	Player	Position	College
131	Pittsburgh Steelers	Hubbard Law	Back	Sam Houston State
132	Cleveland Rams	Ike Peel	Back	Tennessee
133	Philadelphia Eagles	O'Dell Griffin	Guard	Baylor
134	Chicago Cardinals	Marv Harshman	Back	Pacific Lutheran
135	Detroit Lions	Mac Speedie	End	Utah
136	Washington Redskins	Marvin Whited	Back	Oklahoma
137	Brooklyn Dodgers	Gene Davis	Back	Penn
138	New York Giants	Buddy Jungmichel	Guard	Texas
139	Green Bay Packers	Jim Trimble	Tackle	Indiana
140	Chicago Bears	Joe Krutulis	End	Miami (FL)

=== Round 16 ===
Pick #	NFL team	Player	Position	College
141	Pittsburgh Steelers	Andy Tomasic	Back	Temple
142	Cleveland Rams	Glenn Henicle	Guard	Tulsa
143	Philadelphia Eagles	Bill Smaltz	Back	Penn State
144	Chicago Cardinals	George Arabian	Back	St. Mary's (CA)
145	Detroit Lions	Firman Bynum	Tackle	Arkansas
146	Washington Redskins	Dean "Dee" Chipman	Back	BYU
147	Brooklyn Dodgers	Ed Masloski	Back	Scranton
148	New York Giants	Keith Doggett	Tackle	Wichita
149	Green Bay Packers	Tom Kinkade	Back	Ohio State
150	Chicago Bears	George Abel	Guard	Nebraska

=== Round 17 ===
Pick #	NFL team	Player	Position	College
151	Pittsburgh Steelers	Garth Chamberlain	Tackle	BYU
152	Cleveland Rams	Don Clawson	Back	Northwestern
153	Philadelphia Eagles	Arnie Meiners	End	Stanford
154	Chicago Cardinals	Jack Crain	Back	Texas
155	Detroit Lions	Dick Fisher	Back	Ohio State
156	Washington Redskins	George Watts	Tackle	Appalachian State
157	Brooklyn Dodgers	R. C. Pitts	End	Arkansas
158	New York Giants	Verne Miller	Tackle	Harvard
159	Green Bay Packers	Fred Preston	End	Nebraska
160	Chicago Bears	Don Edmiston	Tackle	Tennessee

=== Round 18 ===
Pick #	NFL team	Player	Position	College
161	Pittsburgh Steelers	John Rokisky	End	Duquesne
162	Cleveland Rams	Jack Graf	Back	Ohio State
163	Philadelphia Eagles	Bill Braun	Tackle	Santa Clara
164	Chicago Cardinals	Carl Suntheimer	Center	North Carolina
165	Detroit Lions	George Speth	Tackle	Murray State
166	Washington Redskins	Gene Stewart	Back	Willamette
167	Brooklyn Dodgers	Ralph Miller	Back	Kansas
168	New York Giants	John "Junie" Hovious	Back	Ole Miss
169	Green Bay Packers	Robert Ingalls	Center	Michigan
170	Chicago Bears	Holt Rast	End	Alabama

=== Round 19 ===
Pick #	NFL team	Player	Position	College
171	Pittsburgh Steelers	Ray "Earthquake" Jenkins	Back	Colorado
172	Cleveland Rams	Bill Regner	End	Oregon
173	Philadelphia Eagles	Charley Dvoracek	Back	Texas Tech
174	Chicago Cardinals	Jimmy Nelson	Back	Alabama
175	Detroit Lions	Blair Heaton	End	Susquehanna
176	Washington Redskins	Charlie Timmons	Back	Clemson
177	Brooklyn Dodgers	Wilson Elliott	Tackle	Chattanooga
178	New York Giants	Owen Price	Back	Texas Western
179	Green Bay Packers	George Benson	Back	Northwestern
180	Chicago Bears	Edgar "Special Delivery" Jones	Back	Pittsburgh

=== Round 20 ===
Pick #	NFL team	Player	Position	College
181	Pittsburgh Steelers	Frank Kapriva	Guard	Wake Forest
182	Cleveland Rams	Gene Conley	Tackle	Washington
183	Philadelphia Eagles	Marv Tommervik	Back	Pacific Lutheran
184	Chicago Cardinals	Norvell Wallach	Tackle	Missouri
185	Detroit Lions	Ben Collins	Back	West Texas State
186	Washington Redskins	Milburn "Tiny" Croft	Tackle	Ripon
187	Brooklyn Dodgers	Bill Polantonio	Guard	Elon
188	New York Giants	Adam Kretowicz	End	Holy Cross
189	Green Bay Packers	Horace "Deacon" Young	Back	SMU
190	Chicago Bears	Bill Tessendorf	Tackle	Gonzaga

=== Round 21 ===
Pick #	NFL team	Player	Position	College
191	Washington Redskins	Steve Juzwik	Back	Notre Dame
192	Brooklyn Dodgers	Bert Hayes	Back	Wichita
193	New York Giants	Jim "Blackie" Blumenstock	Back	Fordham
194	Green Bay Packers	Henry Woronicz	End	Boston College
195	Chicago Bears	Adolph Kissell	Back	Boston College

=== Round 22 ===
Pick #	NFL team	Player	Position	College
196	Washington Redskins	Al Couppee	Back	Iowa
197	Brooklyn Dodgers	Walt Fedora	Back	George Washington
198	New York Giants	Milt Hull	Tackle	Florida
199	Green Bay Packers	Woody Adams	Tackle	TCU
200	Chicago Bears	Stu Clarkson	Center	Texas A&I

== Hall of Famers ==
- Bill Dudley, halfback from Virginia taken 1st round 1st overall by the Pittsburgh Steelers.

Inducted: Professional Football Hall of Fame class of 1966.

- Mac Speedie, end from Utah taken 15th round 135th overall by the Detroit Lions.

Inducted: Professional Football Hall of Fame Class of 2020

== Notable undrafted players ==
^{†}	= Pro Bowler

Original NFL team	Player	Pos.	College	Notes
Chicago Bears	Clint Wager	E	St. Mary's (MN)	
Chicago Cardinals	Chet Bulger ^{†}	T	Auburn	
Cleveland Rams	Bosh Pritchard ^{†}	RB	Georgia Tech	
Green Bay Packers	Ted Fritsch ^{†}	RB	UW–Stevens Point	
New York Giants	Frank Liebel	DB	Norwich	
Washington Redskins	Dick Poillon ^{†}	RB/CB	Canisius	
