= Curt Mecham =

American football player (born 1920–1993)

- Mecham with the Oregon Ducks in 1941

No. 20
- Position: Tailback

Personal information
- Born: March 2, 1920; Bakersfield, California, U.S.
- Died: May 26, 1993 (aged 73); Kern County, California, U.S.
- Listed height: 6 ft 0 in (1.83 m)
- Listed weight: 180 lb (82 kg)

Career information
- High school: Bakersfield
- College: Bakersfield (1938–1939); Oregon (1940–1941)
- NFL draft: 1942: 3rd round, 22nd overall pick

Career history
- Brooklyn Dodgers (1942)

Awards and highlights
- Second-team All-PCC (1941); Western Conference MVP (1939); First-team All-Western Conference (1939)

Career NFL statistics
- Passing attempts: 4
- Passing completions: 1
- Completion percentage: 25.0%
- TD–INT: 0–1
- Passing yards: 9
- Stats at Pro Football Reference

William "Curly" Curtis Mecham (born March 2, 1920 – May 26, 1993) was an American professional football player who was a tailback for the Brooklyn Dodgers of the National Football League (NFL). He played college football for the Bakersfield Renegades and Oregon Ducks.

== Early life ==
Mecham was born on March 2, 1920, in Bakersfield, California, where he attended Bakersfield High School.

== College career ==
Mecham played college football for the Bakersfield Renegades from 1938 to 1939 and Oregon Ducks from 1940 to 1941. He played two seasons at Bakersfield College, earning All-Western Conference and MVP honors in 1939. In 1940, Mecham transferred to University of Oregon. In his first season, he rushed for 330 yards. The following year, Mecham led the Pacific Coast Conference (PCC) in rushing yards, carrying the ball 97 times for 458 yards. As a senior, he was named to the second-team All-PCC team.

== Professional career ==
Mecham was selected in the third round, with the 22nd overall selection, by the Brooklyn Dodgers in the 1942 NFL draft. He played in eight games passing for nine yards and one interception on 1-of-4 passing. Mecham also rushed three times for zero yards. He was released at the end of the season.

== Personal life ==
Mecham served in the Navy as a Seabee shipfitter during World War II. He was stationed at Camp Peary in Virginia. Mecham died on May 26, 1993, in Kern County, California.
