= Tom Kearns =

Tom Kearns may refer to:

- Tom Kearns (baseball) (1859–1938), Major League Baseball player
- Tom Kearns (American football) (1919–2007), American politician and American football player

== See also ==
- Thomas Kearns (1862–1918), American mining, banking, railroad and newspaper magnate
- Thomas Kearns (athlete) (born 1966), Irish athlete
