= 1941 Rutgers Queensmen football team =

American college football season

1941 Rutgers Queensmen football
- Conference: Middle Three Conference
- Record: 7–2 (1–1 Middle Three)
- Head coach: Harvey Harman (4th season)
- Home stadium: Rutgers Stadium

1941 Middle Three Conference football standings
| | Conf. | | | | | Overall |
| Team | W | | L | | T | W | | L | | T |
|---|---|---|---|---|---|---|---|---|---|---|
| Lafayette $ | 2 | – | 0 | – | 0 | 5 | – | 4 | – | 0 |
| Rutgers | 1 | – | 1 | – | 0 | 7 | – | 2 | – | 0 |
| Lehigh | 0 | – | 2 | – | 0 | 0 | – | 6 | – | 3 |
$ – Conference champion

The 1941 Rutgers Queensmen football team represented Rutgers University in the 1941 college football season. In their fourth season under head coach Harvey Harman, the Queensmen compiled a 7–2 record and outscored their opponents 174 to 85. The team's two losses were against Syracuse (49–7) and Lafayette (16–0).

Rutgers was ranked at No. 127 (out of 681 teams) in the final rankings under the Litkenhous Difference by Score System for 1941.

In February 1942, following the Japanese attack on Pearl Harbor, Rutgers head coach Harman, who had led the team to a 26–7–1 record from 1938 to 1941, joined the United States Navy. Harman missed the 1942 to 1945 seasons due to military service.

== Schedule ==
| Date | Opponent | Site | Result | Attendance | Source |
|---|---|---|---|---|---|
| September 27 | Alfred* | Rutgers Stadium; Piscataway, NJ | W 34–0 | 4,500 | |
| October 4 | Springfield* | Rutgers Stadium; Piscataway, NJ | W 26–0 | 6,000 | |
| October 11 | Lehigh | Rutgers Stadium; Piscataway, NJ | W 16–6 | 8,000 | |
| October 18 | Fort Monmouth* | Rutgers Stadium; Piscataway, NJ | W 26–0 | 8,000 | |
| October 25 | at Syracuse* | Archbold Stadium; Syracuse, NY | L 7–49 | 10,000 | |
| November 1 | Maryland* | Rutgers Stadium; Piscataway, NJ | W 20–0 | 1,500 | |
| November 8 | at Lafayette | Fisher Field; Easton, PA | L 0–16 | 10,000 | |
| November 15 | Connecticut* | Rutgers Stadium; Piscataway, NJ | W 32–7 | 10,500 | |
| November 20 | at Brown* | Brown Stadium; Providence, RI | W 13–7 | 15,000 | |
*Non-conference game
