= 1941 Delaware Fightin' Blue Hens football team =

American college football season

1941 Delaware Fightin' Blue Hens football
- Conference: Independent
- Record: 7–0–1
- Head coach: William D. Murray (2nd season)
- Home stadium: Frazer Field

1941 Southern college football independents records
| | Conf. | | | Overall |
| Team | W | L | T | W | | L | | T |
|---|---|---|---|---|---|---|---|---|
| East Carolina | | – | | 7 | – | 0 | – | 0 |
| Delaware | | – | | 7 | – | 0 | – | 1 |
| Virginia | | – | | 8 | – | 1 | – | 0 |
| Marshall | | – | | 7 | – | 1 | – | 0 |
| No. 10 Navy | | – | | 7 | – | 1 | – | 1 |
| Georgetown | | – | | 5 | – | 4 | – | 0 |
| Western Maryland | | – | | 3 | – | 4 | – | 1 |
| West Virginia | | – | | 4 | – | 6 | – | 0 |
| Roanoke | | – | | 3 | – | 5 | – | 0 |
| Sewanee | | – | | 2 | – | 5 | – | 0 |
| Delaware State | | – | | 1 | – | 4 | – | 0 |
| Georgia Teachers | | – | | 2 | – | 8 | – | 0 |
Rankings from AP Poll

The 1941 Delaware Fightin' Blue Hens football team was an American football team that represented the University of Delaware in the 1941 college football season. In its second season under head coach William D. Murray, the team compiled a 7–0–1 record, shut out four of eight opponents, and outscored all opponents by a total of 176 to 26.

Delaware's 1941 season was part of a 32-game unbeaten streak that began on October 26, 1940, and ended on October 3, 1947. The only imperfection was a 7-7 tie with West Chester on September 27, 1941, which was followed by a 26-game winning streak.

The team's players included end Buck Thompson, fullback Bill Hogan, quarterback Al Newcomb, tackle Jack Castevens, and center Jim Mullen.

Despite completing an undefeated season in 1941, Delaware's strength of schedule was not rated highly, and the team was ranked at No. 146 (out of 681 teams) in the final 1941 rankings under the Litkenhous Difference by Score System.

== Schedule ==
| Date | Opponent | Site | Result | Attendance | Source |
|---|---|---|---|---|---|
| September 27 | West Chester | Frazer Field; Newark, DE (rivalry) | T 7–7 | | |
| October 4 | Pennsylvania Military | Wilmington Park; Wilmington, DE | W 20–0 | 8,000 | |
| October 11 | at Ursinus | Collegeville, PA | W 24–0 | | |
| October 18 | Dickinson^{†} | Frazer Field; Newark, DE | W 28–0 | | |
| November 1 | Mount St. Mary's | Wilmington Park; Wilmington, DE | W 25–0 | 2,000 | |
| November 8 | at Swarthmore | Swarthmore, PA | W 47–7 | 3,500 | |
| November 15 | at Drexel | Drexel Field; Philadelphia, PA | W 7–6 | 4,500 | |
| November 22 | Washington College | Wilmington Park; Wilmington, DE | W 18–6 | | |
^{†}Homecoming
