= 1941 Columbia Lions football team =

American college football season

1941 Columbia Lions football
- Conference: Ivy League
- Record: 3–5 (3–1 Ivy)
- Head coach: Lou Little (12th season)
- Home stadium: Baker Field

1941 Ivy League football standings
	Conf.					Overall
Team	W		L		T	W		L		T
No. 15 Penn $	5	–	0	–	0	7	–	1	–	0
Columbia	3	–	1	–	0	3	–	5	–	0
Harvard	4	–	2	–	0	5	–	2	–	1
Cornell	3	–	2	–	0	5	–	3	–	0
Dartmouth	2	–	2	–	0	5	–	4	–	0
Brown	1	–	2	–	0	5	–	4	–	0
Princeton	1	–	4	–	0	2	–	6	–	0
Yale	0	–	6	–	0	1	–	7	–	0
$ – Conference champion; Rankings from AP Poll

The 1941 Columbia Lions football team was an American football team that represented the Columbia University in the Ivy League during the 1941 college football season. In their 12th season under head coach Lou Little, the team compiled a 3–5 record and was outscored by a combined total of 103 to 81.

The team was led by left halfback Paul Governali who was selected by the Associated Press as a second-team player on the 1941 All-Eastern football team. Governali went on to win the Maxwell Award in 1942 and was later inducted into the College Football Hall of Fame.

Columbia was ranked at No. 42 (out of 681 teams) in the final rankings under the Litkenhous Difference by Score System for 1941.

The team played its home games at Baker Field in Manhattan.

== Schedule ==
Date	Opponent	Rank	Site	Result	Attendance	Source
October 4	Brown		Baker Field; New York, NY	W 13–6	10,000	
October 11	at Princeton		Palmer Stadium; Princeton, NJ	W 21–0	30,000	
October 18	Georgia*	No. 20	Baker Field; New York, NY	L 3–7	27,000	
October 25	at Army*		Michie Stadium; West Point, NY	L 0–13	28,000	
November 1	Cornell		Baker Field; New York, NY	W 7–0	15,000	
November 8	at No. 19 Penn		Franklin Field; Philadelphia, PA	L 16–19	50,000	
November 15	No. 7 Michigan*		Michigan Stadium; Ann Arbor, MI	L 0–28	35,000	
November 22	Colgate*		Baker Field; New York, NY	L 21–30	23,000	
*Non-conference game; Rankings from AP Poll released prior to the game

== Rankings ==
Ranking movements Legend: ██ Increase in ranking ██ Decrease in ranking — = Not ranked
	Week							
Poll	1	2	3	4	5	6	7	Final
AP	20	—	—	—	—	—	—	—
