= 1941 Delaware State Hornets football team =

American college football season

1941 Delaware State Hornets football
- Conference: Independent
- Record: 1–4
- Head coach: Unknown
- Home stadium: Soldier's Field

1941 Southern college football independents records
	Conf.			Overall
Team	W	L	T	W		L		T
East Carolina		–		7	–	0	–	0
Delaware		–		7	–	0	–	1
Virginia		–		8	–	1	–	0
Marshall		–		7	–	1	–	0
No. 10 Navy		–		7	–	1	–	1
Georgetown		–		5	–	4	–	0
Western Maryland		–		3	–	4	–	1
West Virginia		–		4	–	6	–	0
Roanoke		–		3	–	5	–	0
Sewanee		–		2	–	5	–	0
Delaware State		–		1	–	4	–	0
Georgia Teachers		–		2	–	8	–	0
Rankings from AP Poll

The 1941 Delaware State Hornets football team represented the State College for Colored Students—now known as Delaware State University—in the 1941 college football season as an independent.

== Schedule ==
Date	Opponent	Site	Result	Source
October 15?	Elizabeth City State	Soldier's Field; Dover, DE	L 0–18	
October 18	at Princess Anne	Princess Anne, MD	W 21–6	
October 25	Howard	Soldier's Field; Dover, DE	L 0–13	
November 1	Storer		Cancelled	
November 8	at Bordentown	Bordentown, NJ	?	
	Lincoln (PA)		L 6–13	
November 15	Cheyney	Soldier's Field; Dover, DE	L 12–27	
