= John Goodyear =

American football player (1920–2002)

No. 12
- Position: Running back

Personal information
- Born: June 10, 1920; La Grange, Illinois, U.S.
- Died: March 7, 2002 (aged 81); Riverside, California, U.S.
- Listed height: 6 ft 0 in (1.83 m)
- Listed weight: 190 lb (86 kg)

Career information
- High school: Lyons Township (La Grange)
- College: Marquette
- NFL draft: 1942: 10th round, 86th overall pick

Career history
- Washington Redskins (1942)

Awards and highlights
- NFL champion (1942)

Career NFL statistics
- Rushing yards: 1
- Rushing average: 0.5
- Stats at Pro Football Reference

John Martin Goodyear (June 10, 1920 – March 7, 2002) was an American professional football running back in the National Football League (NFL) for the Washington Redskins. He played college football at Marquette University and was selected 86th overall in the tenth round of the 1942 NFL draft.
