= 1941 Yale Bulldogs football team =

American college football season

1941 Yale Bulldogs football
- Conference: Ivy League
- Record: 1–7 (0–6 Ivy)
- Head coach: Spike Nelson (1st season)
- Captain: Alan E. Bartholemy
- Home stadium: Yale Bowl

1941 Ivy League football standings
	Conf.					Overall
Team	W		L		T	W		L		T
No. 15 Penn $	5	–	0	–	0	7	–	1	–	0
Columbia	3	–	1	–	0	3	–	5	–	0
Harvard	4	–	2	–	0	5	–	2	–	1
Cornell	3	–	2	–	0	5	–	3	–	0
Dartmouth	2	–	2	–	0	5	–	4	–	0
Brown	1	–	2	–	0	5	–	4	–	0
Princeton	1	–	4	–	0	2	–	6	–	0
Yale	0	–	6	–	0	1	–	7	–	0
$ – Conference champion; Rankings from AP Poll

The 1941 Yale Bulldogs football team was an American football team that represented Yale University in the Ivy League during the 1941 college football season. In their first and only season under head coach Spike Nelson, the Bulldogs compiled a 1–7 record and were outscored by a total of 136 to 54.

Yale was ranked at No. 78 (out of 681 teams) in the final rankings under the Litkenhous Difference by Score System for 1941.

The team played its home games at the Yale Bowl in New Haven, Connecticut.

== Schedule ==
Date	Opponent	Site	Result	Attendance	Source
October 4	Virginia*	Yale Bowl; New Haven, CT	W 21–19	25,000	
October 11	Penn	Yale Bowl; New Haven, CT	L 13–28	30,000	
October 18	Army*	Yale Bowl; New Haven, CT	L 7–20	56,000	
October 25	Dartmouth	Yale Bowl; New Haven, CT	L 0–7		
November 1	Brown	Yale Bowl; New Haven, CT	L 0–7	9,000	
November 8	at Cornell	Schoellkopf Field; Ithaca, NY	L 7–21	18,000	
November 15	Princeton	Yale Bowl; New Haven, CT (rivalry)	L 6–20	35,000	
November 22	at Harvard	Harvard Stadium; Boston, MA (rivalry)	L 0–14	53,000	
*Non-conference game
