= 1941 Dartmouth Indians football team =

American college football season

1941 Dartmouth Indians football
- Conference: Ivy League
- Record: 5–4 (2–2 Ivy)
- Head coach: Tuss McLaughry (1st season)
- Home stadium: Memorial Field

1941 Ivy League football standings
	Conf.					Overall
Team	W		L		T	W		L		T
No. 15 Penn $	5	–	0	–	0	7	–	1	–	0
Columbia	3	–	1	–	0	3	–	5	–	0
Harvard	4	–	2	–	0	5	–	2	–	1
Cornell	3	–	2	–	0	5	–	3	–	0
Dartmouth	2	–	2	–	0	5	–	4	–	0
Brown	1	–	2	–	0	5	–	4	–	0
Princeton	1	–	4	–	0	2	–	6	–	0
Yale	0	–	6	–	0	1	–	7	–	0
$ – Conference champion; Rankings from AP Poll

The 1941 Dartmouth Indians football team represented Dartmouth College in the Ivy League during the 1941 college football season. In its first season under head coach Tuss McLaughry, the team compiled a 5–4 record and was outscored by a total of 146 to 104.

Quarterback John Krol and halfback Douglas were selected by the United Press as second-team players on the 1941 All-New England football team.

Dartmouth was ranked at No. 47 (out of 681 teams) in the final rankings under the Litkenhous Difference by Score System for 1941.

The team played its home games at Memorial Field in Hanover, New Hampshire.

== Schedule ==
Date	Opponent	Site	Result	Attendance	Source
September 27	Norwich*	Memorial Field; Hanover, NH	W 35–0		
October 4	Amherst*	Memorial Field; Hanover, NH	W 47–7		
October 11	Colgate*	Memorial Field; Hanover, NH	W 18–6		
October 18	at Harvard	Harvard Stadium; Boston, MA (rivalry)	L 0–7	37,000	
October 25	at Yale	Yale Bowl; New Haven, CT	W 7–0		
November 1	William & Mary*	Memorial Field; Hanover, NH	L 0–3	8,000	
November 8	at Princeton	Palmer Stadium; Princeton, NJ	W 20–13	30,000	
November 15	at Cornell	Schoellkopf Field; Ithaca, NY	L 19–33	18,000	
November 22	at No. 20 Georgia*	Sanford Field; Athens, GA	L 0–35	> 18,000	
*Non-conference game; Rankings from AP Poll released prior to the game
