= John Rokisky =

American football player (1915–1993)

- Rokisky while at Duquesne University

No. 54, 58
- Positions: End, placekicker

Personal information
- Born: November 30, 1919; Mount Clare, West Virginia, U.S.
- Died: December 1, 1993 (aged 74); Keyser, West Virginia, U.S.
- Listed height: 6 ft 2 in (1.88 m)
- Listed weight: 202 lb (92 kg)

Career information
- High school: Washington Irving (Clarksburg, West Virginia)
- College: Duquesne (1938–1941)
- NFL draft: 1942: 18th round, 161st overall pick

Career history
- Cleveland Browns (1946); Chicago Rockets (1947); New York Yankees (1948)

Awards and highlights
- AAFC champion (1946); First-team All-American (1941); First-team All-Eastern (1941)

Career AAFC statistics
- Field goals: 4
- Field goal attempts: 8
- Extra points: 34
- Stats at Pro Football Reference

John Stanley Rokisky (November 30, 1919 – December 1, 1993) was an American professional football player who was an end and placekicker for three seasons with the Cleveland Browns, Chicago Rockets and New York Yankees of the All-America Football Conference (AAFC). Rokisky grew up in West Virginia and played college football for the Duquesne Dukes in Pittsburgh, Pennsylvania, where he was a standout as an end and kicker. After a stint in the U.S. Navy during World War II, he joined the Browns in 1946. The Browns won the AAFC championship that year. Rokisky was sent to the Rockets in 1947 and to the Yankees the following year before leaving football.

== Early life and college career ==
Rokisky was the youngest child of Florian Rokisky and Apolonia (Faculak) Rokisky, Slovak immigrants from the town of Lipnica Wielka (now part of Southern Poland). One of nine children, Rokisky grew up in Clarksburg, West Virginia. He played football for Washington Irving High School in Clarksburg, and as an end and a placekicker at Duquesne University in Pittsburgh, Pennsylvania beginning in 1939, when he was a sophomore. He scored nine points that year in an upset of the University of Pittsburgh. In a December game against the University of Detroit Mercy Titans, he kicked an extra point to tie the game at 10–10 and preserve Duquesne's unbeaten record. The Dukes finished the season undefeated and were ranked eighth in the nation in the AP Poll of the best college teams. After the 1941 season, he was named an All-American by Collier's. At the end of 1941, he played on an eastern all-star college football team, one of three all-star squads he made during college.

After he graduated from Duquesne, Rokisky joined the U.S. Navy in February 1942 and was attached to the Seebee's, a construction battalion. He played football for a military team in 1944 while stationed at Camp Peary in Virginia and was selected to play on the Navy's all-star team. Rokisky served in the Navy until October 1945.

== Professional career ==
Rokisky was selected in the 18th round of the 1942 NFL draft by the Pittsburgh Steelers of the National Football League. He did not sign with the team as he continued his military service. In 1946, following his discharge from the Navy, he signed with the Cleveland Browns, a team under formation in the new All-America Football Conference (AAFC). He was the 21st player signed by the team. Paul Brown, the coach of the Browns, placed Rokisky on the team's inactive list in October to make room for the addition of Bud Schwenk to the team's roster. The Browns went on to win the AAFC championship.

Rokisky played in 1947 for the Chicago Rockets as a kicker, and moved in 1948 to the AAFC's New York Yankees before leaving professional football.

In his later years, Rokisky returned to West Virginia and was the owner of the Potomac Motel & Dining Room and Polish Pines Golf Course in Keyser, West Virginia. He died in Keyser, West Virginia in 1993 and is buried in Clarksburg, WV near his parents.
