= 1941 Navy Midshipmen football team =

American college football season

1941 Navy Midshipmen football
- Conference: Independent

Ranking
- AP: No. 10
- Record: 7–1–1
- Head coach: Swede Larson (3rd season)
- Captain: Dick Foster
- Home stadium: Thompson Stadium

1941 Southern college football independents records
	Conf.			Overall
Team	W	L	T	W		L		T
East Carolina		–		7	–	0	–	0
Delaware		–		7	–	0	–	1
Virginia		–		8	–	1	–	0
Marshall		–		7	–	1	–	0
No. 10 Navy		–		7	–	1	–	1
Georgetown		–		5	–	4	–	0
Western Maryland		–		3	–	4	–	1
West Virginia		–		4	–	6	–	0
Roanoke		–		3	–	5	–	0
Sewanee		–		2	–	5	–	0
Delaware State		–		1	–	4	–	0
Georgia Teachers		–		2	–	8	–	0
Rankings from AP Poll

The 1941 Navy Midshipmen football team was an American football team that represented the United States Naval Academy as an independent during the 1941 college football season. In their third season under head coach Swede Larson, the Midshipmen compiled a 7–1–1 record, shut out five opponents, and outscored all opponents by a combined score of 192 to 34. In the annual Army–Navy Game, the Midshipmen beat the Cadets for the third straight year, and finished the season ranked No. 10 in the final AP poll.

Back Bill Busik and tackle Bill Chewning were selected by the Associated Press as first-team players on the 1941 All-Eastern football team. Tackle Gene Flathmann was named to the second team.

== Schedule ==
Date	Opponent	Rank	Site	Result	Attendance	Source
September 27	William & Mary		Thompson Stadium; Annapolis, MD	W 34–0	18,121	
October 4	West Virginia		Thompson Stadium; Annapolis, MD	W 40–0	20,126	
October 11	Lafayette		Thompson Stadium; Annapolis, MD	W 41–2	21,000	
October 18	Cornell	No. 7	Municipal Stadium; Baltimore, MD	W 14–0	45,000	
October 25	at Harvard	No. 5	Harvard Stadium; Boston, MA	T 0–0	40,000	
November 1	at No. 8 Penn	No. 11	Franklin Field; Philadelphia, PA	W 13–6	74,000	
November 8	No. 7 Notre Dame	No. 6	Municipal Stadium; Baltimore, MD (rivalry)	L 13–20	64,795	
November 22	at Princeton	No. 12	Palmer Stadium; Princeton, NJ	W 23–0	42,000	
November 29	vs. Army	No. 11	Philadelphia Municipal Stadium; Philadelphia, PA (Army–Navy Game)	W 14–6	98,924	
Rankings from AP Poll released prior to the game

== Rankings ==
Ranking movements Legend: ██ Increase in ranking ██ Decrease in ranking ( ) = First-place votes
	Week							
Poll	1	2	3	4	5	6	7	Final
AP	7 (3)	5 (3)	11	6	12	12	11	10

== Personnel ==
- HB Bill Busik
- HB Bob Woods
