= Walt Fedora =

American football player (1918–1968)

- Fedora in 1946

No. 10
- Position: Fullback

Personal information
- Born: September 15, 1918; Decatur, Illinois, U.S.
- Died: September 16, 1968 (aged 50); Washington, D.C., U.S.
- Listed height: 6 ft 1 in (1.85 m)
- Listed weight: 190 lb (86 kg)

Career information
- High school: Decatur
- College: George Washington (1938–1941)
- NFL draft: 1942: 22nd round, 197th overall pick

Career history
- Brooklyn Dodgers (1942); Buffalo Bisons (1946)*
- * Offseason or practice squad member only
- Stats at Pro Football Reference

Walter E. Fedora (September 15, 1918 – September 16, 1968) was an American professional football fullback who played for the Brooklyn Dodgers of the National Football League (NFL). He played college football at George Washington, and was selected by the Dodgers in the 22nd round of the 1942 NFL draft.

== Early life ==
Walter E. Fedora was born on September 15, 1918, in Decatur, Illinois. He played high school football at Decatur High School.

== College career ==
Fedora enrolled at George Washington University to play for the Colonials. The Herald & Review said he was the "star" of George Washington's 1938 freshman team. He played for the varsity team from 1939 to 1941.

== Professional career ==
Fedora was selected by the Brooklyn Dodgers in the 22nd round, with the 197th overall pick, of the 1942 NFL draft. He officially signed with the team on July 21, 1942. He played in eight games for the Dodgers during the 1942 season, rushing 16 times for 34 yards while also returning four kicks for 75 yards. He played linebacker on defense as well.

After serving in the United States Navy during World War II, Fedora signed with the Buffalo Bisons of the All-America Football Conference on March 21, 1946. However, he was released before playing in any games.

== Personal life ==
Fedora worked as a lifeguard in college. In 1950, he was the athletic director at Upper Marlboro High School. He was head football coach at Suitland High School from 1951 to 1963. Fedora was also chairman of Suitland High's physical education department. He taught in the Prince George's County Public Schools system for 22 years. He died on September 16, 1968, at a hospital in Washington, D.C. after a short illness.
