= Dale Gentry =

American football player (1917–1968)

- Gentry in 1946

Profile
- Position: End

Personal information
- Born: July 2, 1917; Umapine, Oregon, U.S.
- Died: June 27, 1968 (aged 50); Portland, Oregon, U.S.
- Listed height: 6 ft 3 in (1.91 m)
- Listed weight: 223 lb (101 kg)

Career information
- High school: Walla Walla (WA)
- College: Washington State

Career history
- Los Angeles Dons (1946-1948)

Awards and highlights
- First-team All-PCC (1941)

Career AAFC statistics
- Games played: 42
- Starts: 27
- Receiving yards: 1,001
- Touchdowns: 6
- Stats at Pro Football Reference

Dale Laverne Gentry (July 2, 1917 – June 27, 1968) was an American football end.

== Biography ==
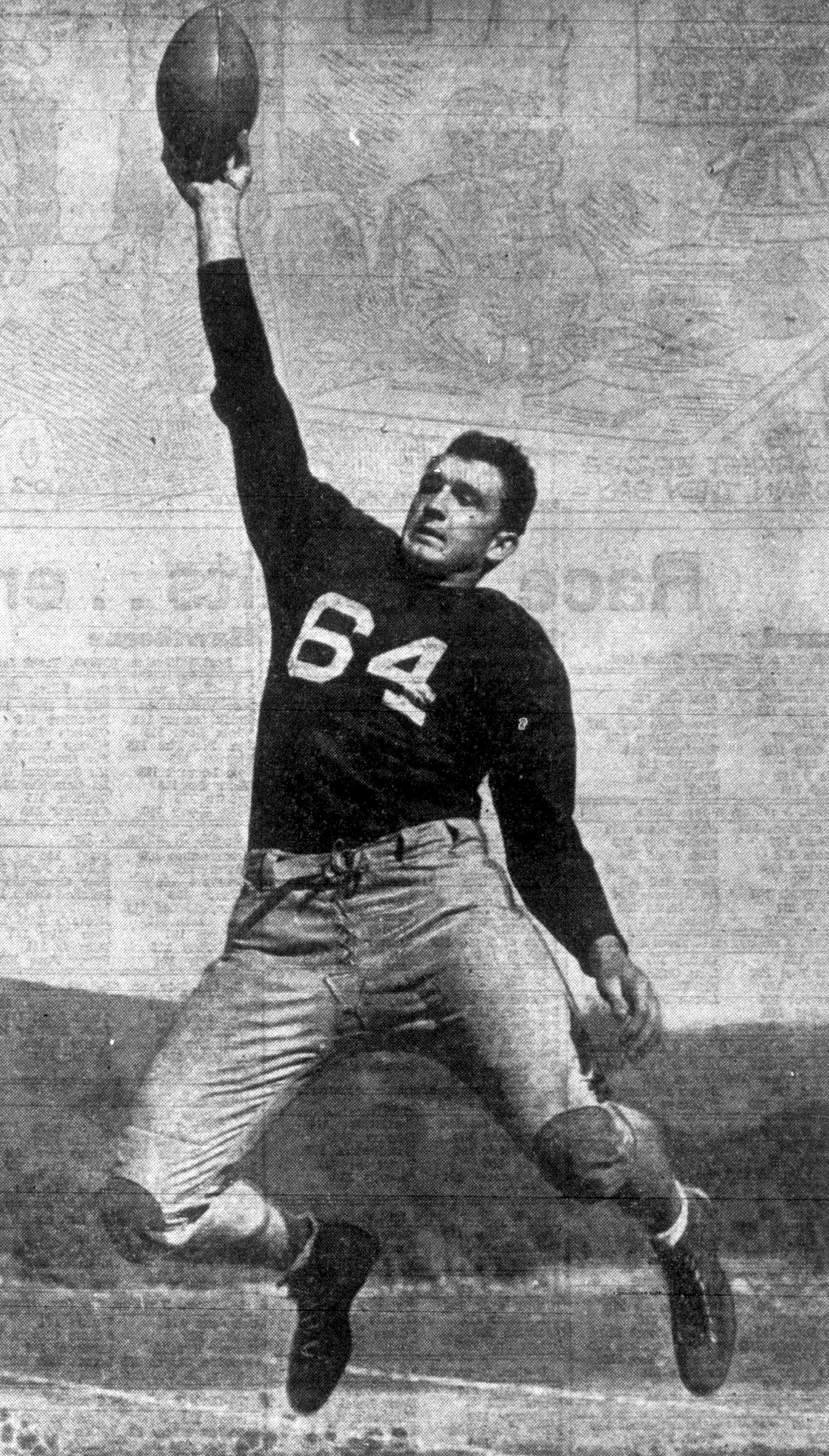
Gentry as a collegian.

Dale Gentry was born in Umapine, Oregon and graduated from Walla Walla High School in Walla Walla, Washington. He played college football at Washington State College in Pullman under head coach Babe Hollingbery, and was selected by the Associated Press as a first-team end on the All-Pacific Coast team in 1941. Gentry also played baseball and basketball for the Cougars.

He served in the U.S. Navy during World War II, and played on the Saint Mary's Pre-Flight Air Devils football team.

Gentry played professional football in the All-America Football Conference for the Los Angeles Dons from 1946 to 1948. He appeared in 42 games, 27 as a starter, and caught 74 passes for 1,001 yards and five touchdowns, with one additional touchdown scored rushing. He also played professional basketball with the Spokane Blazers of the Pacific Coast Basketball League. Gentry was an assistant at his alma mater under head coach Al Kircher in the 1950s, and later the athletic director at the state penitentiary in Walla Walla.

Gentry died at age 50 in Portland, Oregon, from a heart attack, one day after his teenage son was killed in an automobile accident.
