= Bob Westfall =

American football player (1919–1980)

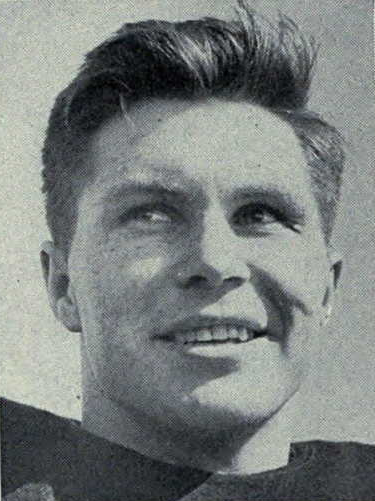
- Westfall from 1948 Michiganensian

No. 86, 85
- Positions: Fullback, linebacker, tailback

Personal information
- Born: May 5, 1919; Detroit, Michigan, U.S.
- Died: October 23, 1980 (aged 61); Adrian, Michigan, U.S.
- Listed height: 5 ft 8 in (1.73 m)
- Listed weight: 190 lb (86 kg)

Career information
- High school: Ann Arbor (Ann Arbor, Michigan)
- College: Michigan (1939–1941)
- NFL draft: 1942: 1st round, 5th overall pick

Career history
- Detroit Lions (1944–1947)

Awards and highlights
- First-team All-Pro (1945); Consensus All-American (1941); First-team All-Big Ten (1941); Second-team All-Big Ten (1940)

Career NFL statistics
- Rushing yards: 697
- Rushing average: 3.3
- Rushing touchdowns: 11
- Receptions: 47
- Receiving yards: 588
- Receiving touchdowns: 5
- Stats at Pro Football Reference
- College Football Hall of Fame

Robert Barton "Bullet Bob" Westfall (May 5, 1919 – October 23, 1980) was an American professional football fullback who played for the Detroit Lions of the National Football League (NFL). He played college football for the Michigan Wolverines, where he was selected as a consensus first-team All-American in 1941. In 1987, Westfall was enshrined in the College Football Hall of Fame.

== Biography ==
Westfall was born in 1919 in Hamtramck, Michigan. His father abandoned the family when Westfall was two years old which necessitated he and his older sister living in foster homes until his mother was able to move them to Ann Arbor, Michigan in 1924. There, Westfall's mother worked 14-hour days in a laundry six days per week, and the children worked, too, to make ends meet. At age 10 Westfall started as a caddy and worked other jobs while his sister sewed as they struggled to survive during the Great Depression. They lived in a tiny second-floor apartment on Greene Street "in the shadow of the Michigan Stadium"-a location perhaps affecting the future. Showing leadership at an early age, Westfall was the class president from 8th grade at Tappan Junior High School through the 12th grade at Ann Arbor High School. Demonstrating a remarkable talent for athletics, Westfall starred in football, basketball, baseball, and track at Ann Arbor High School. Engaging in sports at all was remarkable due to severe bronchial asthma that affected him from the age of nine throughout his entire life. He was diagnosed by doctors at the University of Michigan Hospital as having one of the worst cases of asthma that they had ever encountered. Ted Kennedy, who played center in front of Westfall for the four years (1938–1941) they were at Michigan together recalled that Westfall "had asthma attacks so bad he could hardly breathe" but that "he was a very courageous player." "I remember," said Kennedy, "one night before a big Minnesota game-it was for the national championship-Bob had an attack, and they wouldn't let him into health services-he didn't have the right cards or something like that. He had to crawl home on his hands and knees that night, but he played the next day." Westfall was the first Ann Arbor High School graduate to play for the Wolverines since Hall of Famer John Maulbetsch in 1916. He was the starting fullback in every Michigan football game from 1939–1941. In his sophomore and junior years, he played in a backfield that also included Tom Harmon and Forest Evashevski. Westfall rushed for 1,864 yards on 428 carries (4.36 yards per carry) in 24 games (Michigan only played 8 games per season then and freshmen were not eligible for varsity play). This stood as a Michigan fullback career rushing record for 30 years.

=== Westfall's stocky build ===
Westfall was a stocky runner, listed in the Michigan program at five-feet, eight-inches tall and weighing 180 pounds (five-feet, seven-inches according to some reports). He actually was 5'6" tall and weighed 165-170 pounds. He had large powerful legs and one newspaper report called him Michigan's "chunky fullback" and noted that he was "generally recognized as the greatest exponent of the spinner play in collegiate ranks." Michigan Coach Fritz Crisler said of Westfall, "He has the finest running base I've ever seen in football, and he can run in all kinds of weather."

=== 1940 season ===
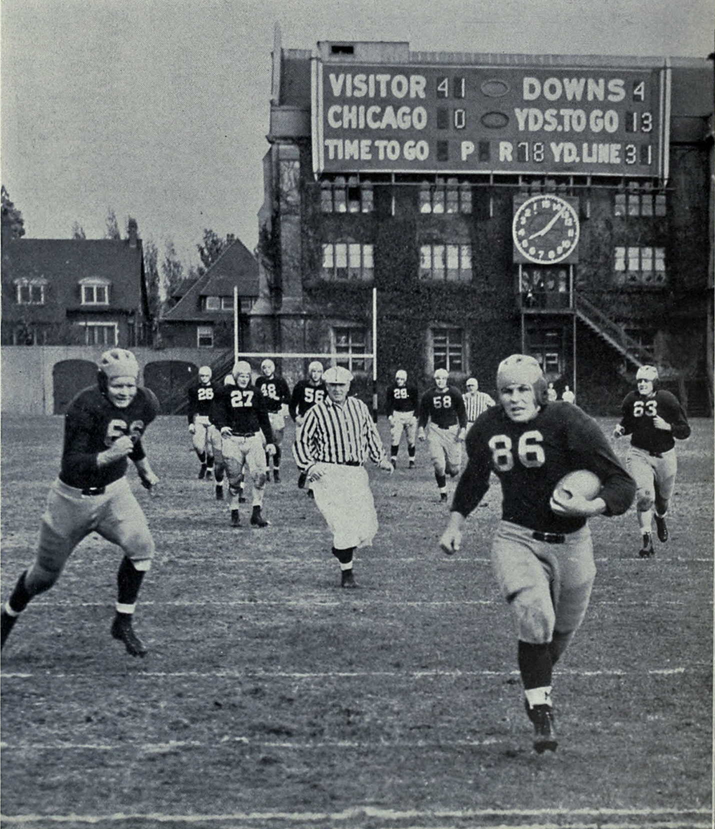
Westfall runs for a touchdown against Chicago, 1939.

In 1940, Michigan had two of the country's four leading ground gainers. Tom Harmon netted 852 yards, slightly better than Westfall who netted 808 rushing yards. Though Westfall's rushing yards ranked him as the country's fourth leading ground gainer in 1940, his performance that year was initially overshadowed by teammate Harmon who led the country in scoring and won the Heisman Trophy.

In October 1940, Westfall rushed for 152 yards on 37 carries in a 28-0 win over Illinois. Newspaper coverage of the game finally brought Westfall out of Harmon's shadow. The Associated Press opened its coverage of the game by focusing on Westfall: "A vengeful Michigan football team, with sure footed Bob Westfall smashing thru the Illinois forwards on a slippery turf, crushed Coach Bob Zuppke's eleven ..." The Hearst newspapers reported on Westfall's performance this way: "In the general practice of watching out for Tom Harmon, the Michigan marvel, to start running, or for Bob Zuppke, the wily Illinois coach, to produce his miracles, no one at first paid much attention to Michigan's fullback, Bob Westfall. That was a mistake."

Westfall outshone Harmon again in a 20-13 win over Northwestern in November 1940. Westfall scored two touchdowns and, with three minutes to play, made "the defensive gem" of the game by tackling Red Hahnenstein a yard short of a first down on the Michigan seven-yard line. Under the headline "WESTFALL IS HERO OF THE HEATED GAME," the Associated Press reported that Red Grange was in attendance to watch Harmon try to break Grange's scoring record, "but Bob Westfall, Michigan fullback, stole the show."

By the end of the 1940 season, Westfall had begun to receive the attention of the press. An Associated Press feature on Westfall in mid-November noted:

"Football fans in record numbers are paying their way to see Michigan's Tom Harmon playing his last season, but many of them are coming away from games with the question, 'Who's that guy, Westfall?' Outside the focus of the publicity spotlight, Bullet Bob Westfall, a stocky 180-pound fullback, has matched All-America Tommy almost yard for yard by rushing this fall and in at least three games has stolen the show from his illustrious teammate."

=== 1941 season ===
As a senior in 1941, Westfall was captain of the Michigan football team that went 6-1-1 and finished the season ranked No. 5 in the final Associated Press poll.

In October 1941, the Associated Press published a feature story on Westfall in which they described him as follows: "Westfall is not a flashy type. The triple threat business is for the other boys. He doesn't kick; He doesn't pass. But, boy, how he can spin with that football. Captain Bob is pudgy and built close to the ground. Once he gets rolling, look out!"

In a November 1941 game against Columbia at Baker Field in New York City, Westfall scored three touchdowns for his highest single-game point total. Crisler pulled Westfall early in the third quarter to avoid embarrassing Columbia.

Westfall's final game in a Michigan uniform was a 20-20 tie with Ohio State. Westfall rushed for 162 yards in the game, nearly as much as the entire Ohio State backfield combined. As Michigan had been favored, the Ohio State players celebrated on the field in Ann Arbor. Westfall walked over to the Buckeyes and handed them the battered game ball, reported to have been "a silent admission of the Buckeye's moral victory." Ohio State Coach Paul Brown said of Westfall's act, "That was a nice gesture; the Ohio State-Michigan sportsmanship still holds."

At the end of the 1941 season, Westfall was a consensus All-American, selected as the first-team fullback by Grantland Rice, the Associated Press ("AP"), United Press, All-America Board, Collier's, the Newspaper Enterprise Association ("NEA"), the International News Service, the Central Press Association, the New York Sun and the Walter Camp Football Foundation. He finished eighth in the Heisman Trophy voting. One of the All-America selectors, Harry Grayson writing for the NEA, explained the selection of Westfall:

"Westfall is one of the slickest spinners the game has known. Fritz Crisier built the Michigan attack around Westfall. A fullback built close to the ground, Bob's 186 pounds is spread over no more than five feet eight inches. He averaged more than four yards per whack against the hardest kind of opposition. He fumbled only once in three years and then, in the Minnesota game this year, when he was bumped by a young wingback coming too shallow on a reverse. A bruising fullback, Westfall also skirted the ends, was a superlative blocker and a stout defender."

Westfall was also selected to play in both major post-season all-star games. He was captain of the Eastern All-Stars in the New Year's Day East-West Shrine Game in New Orleans. The Shrine game was traditionally played in San Francisco but, less than a month after the attack on Pearl Harbor, it was moved to New Orleans due to concerns about an attack on the West Coast. The game ended in a 6-6 tie, and Westfall was the leading rusher with 94 yards in 20 carries. The United Press called him "Michigan's human top" and tabbed him as one of the two brightest stars for the East. In July 1942, Westfall was voted as the starting fullback on the College All-American team in an annual game against the NFL championship team. Westfall was unanimously selected by the coaches of the Big Ten Conference.

=== Service in World War II ===
In November 1941, the Associated Press ran a story about Westfall being rated as class 4-F and therefore ineligible for the draft. Westfall told reporters that a perforated eardrum and a tendency to asthma resulted in the 4-F classification. The AP noted: "Bullet Bob Westfall may look like a physical wreck to his draft board but he's on his way to national recognition as at least one of the greatest fullbacks again this season." After Pearl Harbor was bombed on December 7, 1941, he enlisted in the Army Air Corps.

In late December 1941, the Detroit Lions selected Westfall as their first-round pick (5th selection overall) in the 1942 NFL draft.

In February 1942, Westfall married his college sweetheart, Ruthmary Smith of Wayne, Michigan. At the time of his wedding, Westfall told reporters that after graduating in June, he might play for the Lions if the Army would not take him.

In the summer of 1942, the Army did take Westfall despite his 4-F rating. Westfall was initially assigned to play for the Eastern All-Army football team, but he broke his left elbow after falling from a horse in August 1942. Westfall had played in the College All-Star game in late August unaware that his elbow was broken.

In August 1943, an Army newspaper reported that Westfall had "washed out" of the Army Air Corps flight school because, "of all things, he was too nervous." According to another account, he "cracked up his plane while training." (In actuality, he suffered from air sickness which culminated in his damaging a training plane during an attempted landing.) Westfall was subsequently reassigned to the Air Corps radio operator program at Scott Field in Illinois.

In December 1943, Westfall received a medical discharge from the Army Air Corps while still stationed at Scott Field. He was reported to have been discharged as a result of bronchitis and asthma.

=== Professional football player ===
Westfall returned to the University of Michigan in 1944 to complete his degree and he also worked at the B-24 bomber plant in Willow Run, Michigan. Under wartime rules, he was eligible to play for the Michigan football team in the fall of 1944. However, newspapers reported that Big Ten officials were concerned that Westfall might play for the Wolverines in the season's early games while completing his degree, and then play for the Detroit Lions at the end of the 1944 season. The prospect of a player starting the year as a college player and then being paid to play professional football the same year was seen as a potential embarrassment to the conference.

Through the summer months, newspapers reported on the "burning question whether Westfall would play for Michigan or the Detroit Lions." Lions coach Gus Dorais told the press, "Football salaries are paid for ability and gate appeal, and we are sure Westfall still has both. Naturally, we want Westfall and hope to sign him. He's 25 years old now, and we believe that if he's going to cash in on his football, now's the time."

Westfall finally signed with Lions in August 1944, and played four seasons in the NFL from 1944–1947. In one of his early games in the NFL, Westfall ran for two touchdowns against the defending NFL champions, the Chicago Bears, in a game played at Wrigley Field. Westfall's touchdowns against the Bears included a 75-yard touchdown sprint through the middle of the Bears line. As a rookie, he compiled 342 passing yards for 4 touchdowns, 277 rushing yards, 218 receiving yards, and 117 yards on punt and kickoff returns. He also had a 30-yard interception return in 1944.

Westfall had his best season as a pro in 1945 when he was picked as a first-team All-Pro by the Associated Press. That year, he scored 54 points in nine games and ranked fourth in the NFL in touchdowns and sixth in scoring.

=== Later life ===
After retiring from professional football in 1947, Westfall became a businessman in Adrian, Michigan. He was the secretary-treasurer of the Adrian Salvage Company from 1948–1953 and later served for 27 years as president of Adrian Steel Company. He also coached a semi-pro football team in Adrian, Adrian Athletic Club (also known as The Big Reds), for three years from 1948–1950. Their record was 19-4-3 including a string of eighteen games without a loss. The 1950 team was undefeated, untied, and unscored-upon while outscoring the opposition 203-0. Westfall died in 1980 at age 61. In 1979 Westfall was selected by U of M officials as one of the 25 All-Time Great University of Michigan football players, which was announced on the TV program "Blue Magic", hosted by Tom Harmon. In 1982 Westfall was posthumously inducted into the University of Michigan Athletic Hall of Honor. In 1986, he was posthumously inducted into the Michigan Sports Hall of Fame (State of Michigan). He was posthumously inducted into the College Football Hall of Fame in 1987. In 2000, he was named as a running back (Honorable Mention) to the University of Michigan All-Century Team and as a member of The Backfield of the Century for the years 1900–1999. In 2005, he was selected as one of the 100 greatest Michigan football players of all time by " Motown Sports Revival," ranking 75th on the all-time team.

== See also ==
- List of Michigan Wolverines football All-Americans
- University of Michigan Athletic Hall of Honor
- Michigan Sports Hall of Fame
