= 1941 Princeton Tigers football team =

American college football season

1941 Princeton Tigers football
- Conference: Ivy League
- Record: 2–6 (1–4 Ivy)
- Head coach: Tad Wieman (4th season)
- Captain: Bob Peters
- Home stadium: Palmer Stadium

1941 Ivy League football standings
	Conf.					Overall
Team	W		L		T	W		L		T
No. 15 Penn $	5	–	0	–	0	7	–	1	–	0
Columbia	3	–	1	–	0	3	–	5	–	0
Harvard	4	–	2	–	0	5	–	2	–	1
Cornell	3	–	2	–	0	5	–	3	–	0
Dartmouth	2	–	2	–	0	5	–	4	–	0
Brown	1	–	2	–	0	5	–	4	–	0
Princeton	1	–	4	–	0	2	–	6	–	0
Yale	0	–	6	–	0	1	–	7	–	0
$ – Conference champion; Rankings from AP Poll

The 1941 Princeton Tigers football team was an American football team that represented Princeton University in the Ivy League during the 1941 college football season. In its fourth season under head coach Tad Wieman, the team compiled a 2–6 record and was outscored by a total of 152 to 64.

Princeton was ranked at No. 76 (out of 681 teams) in the final rankings under the Litkenhous Difference by Score System for 1941.

The team played its home games at Palmer Stadium in Princeton, New Jersey.

== Schedule ==
Date	Opponent	Site	Result	Attendance	Source
October 4	Williams*	Palmer Stadium; Princeton, NJ	W 20–7	11,000	
October 11	Columbia	Palmer Stadium; Princeton, NJ	L 0–21	30,000	
October 18	No. 11 Penn	Palmer Stadium; Princeton, NJ (rivalry)	L 0–23	31,500	
October 25	at No. 15 Vanderbilt*	Dudley Field; Nashville, TN	L 7–46	14,000	
November 1	Harvard	Palmer Stadium; Princeton, NJ (rivalry)	L 4–6	18,000	
November 8	Dartmouth	Palmer Stadium; Princeton, NJ	L 13–20	30,000	
November 15	at Yale	Yale Bowl; New Haven, CT (rivalry)	W 20–6	35,000	
November 22	No. 12 Navy*	Palmer Stadium; Princeton, NJ	L 0–23	42,000	
*Non-conference game; Rankings from AP Poll released prior to the game
