= 1941 Cornell Big Red football team =

American college football season

1941 Cornell Big Red football
- Conference: Ivy League
- Record: 5–3 (3–2 Ivy)
- Head coach: Carl Snavely (6th season)
- Offensive scheme: Single-wing
- Captain: Peter Wolff
- Home stadium: Schoellkopf Field

1941 Ivy League football standings
	Conf.					Overall
Team	W		L		T	W		L		T
No. 15 Penn $	5	–	0	–	0	7	–	1	–	0
Columbia	3	–	1	–	0	3	–	5	–	0
Harvard	4	–	2	–	0	5	–	2	–	1
Cornell	3	–	2	–	0	5	–	3	–	0
Dartmouth	2	–	2	–	0	5	–	4	–	0
Brown	1	–	2	–	0	5	–	4	–	0
Princeton	1	–	4	–	0	2	–	6	–	0
Yale	0	–	6	–	0	1	–	7	–	0
$ – Conference champion; Rankings from AP Poll

The 1941 Cornell Big Red football team was an American football team that represented Cornell University in the Ivy League during the 1941 college football season. In its sixth season under head coach Carl Snavely, the team compiled a 5–3 record and outscored opponents by a total of 88 to 65.

Cornell was ranked at No. 21 (out of 681 teams) in the final rankings under the Litkenhous Difference by Score System for 1941.

The team played its home games at Schoellkopf Field in Ithaca, New York.

== Schedule ==
Date	Opponent	Site	Result	Attendance	Source
October 4	Syracuse*	Schoellkopf Field; Ithaca, NY	W 6–0	18,000	
October 11	at Harvard	Harvard Stadium; Boston, MA	W 7–0	20,000	
October 18	at No. 7 Navy*	Municipal Stadium; Baltimore, MD	L 0–14	45,000	
October 25	Colgate*	Schoellkopf Field; Ithaca, NY (rivalry)	W 21–2		
November 1	at Columbia	Baker Field; New York, NY (rivalry)	L 0–7	15,000	
November 8	Yale	Schoellkopf Field; Ithaca, NY	W 21–7	18,000	
November 15	Dartmouth	Schoellkopf Field; Ithaca, NY (rivalry)	W 33–19	18,000	
November 22	at No. 13 Penn	Franklin Field; Philadelphia, PA (rivalry)	L 0–16	74,000	
*Non-conference game; Rankings from AP Poll released prior to the game
