= 1941 West Virginia Mountaineers football team =

American college football season

1941 West Virginia Mountaineers football
- Conference: Independent
- Record: 4–6
- Head coach: Bill Kern (2nd season)
- Captain: Henry Goodman
- Home stadium: Mountaineer Field

1941 Southern college football independents records
	Conf.			Overall
Team	W	L	T	W		L		T
East Carolina		–		7	–	0	–	0
Delaware		–		7	–	0	–	1
Virginia		–		8	–	1	–	0
Marshall		–		7	–	1	–	0
No. 10 Navy		–		7	–	1	–	1
Georgetown		–		5	–	4	–	0
Western Maryland		–		3	–	4	–	1
West Virginia		–		4	–	6	–	0
Roanoke		–		3	–	5	–	0
Sewanee		–		2	–	5	–	0
Delaware State		–		1	–	4	–	0
Georgia Teachers		–		2	–	8	–	0
Rankings from AP Poll

The 1941 West Virginia Mountaineers football team was an American football team that represented West Virginia University as an independent during the 1941 college football season. In its second season under head coach Bill Kern, the team compiled a 4–6 record and was outscored by a total of 126 to 85. Henry Goodman was the team captain. The team played home games at Mountaineer Field in Morgantown, West Virginia.

West Virginia was ranked at No. 90 (out of 681 teams) in the final rankings under the Litkenhous Difference by Score System for 1941.

== Schedule ==
Date	Opponent	Site	Result	Attendance	Source
September 27	Waynesburg	Mountaineer Field; Morgantown, WV	W 13–7	7,547	
October 4	at Navy	Thompson Stadium; Annapolis, MD	L 0–40	20,126	
October 11	West Virginia Wesleyan	Mountaineer Field; Morgantown, WV	W 20–0	6,310	
October 18	at No. 4 Fordham	Polo Grounds; NewYork, NY	L 0–27	12,500	
October 25	at Kentucky	McLean Stadium; Lexington, KY	L 6–18	7,000	
November 1	vs. Washington and Lee	Laidley Field; Charleston, WV	W 7–6	10,000	
November 8	Kansas^{†}	Mountaineer Field; Morgantown, WV	W 21–0	9,300	
November 15	at Penn State	New Beaver Field; State College, PA (rivalry)	L 0–7	11,000	
November 22	at Army	Michie Stadium; West Point, NY	L 6–7	25,000	
November 29	Michigan State	Mountaineer Field; Morgantown, WV	L 12–14	10,126	
^{†}Homecoming; Rankings from AP Poll released prior to the game
