= Ben Hightower =

American football player (1918–2003)

No. 53, 86, 6
- Position: End

Personal information
- Born: December 5, 1918; Beaumont, Texas, U.S.
- Died: January 1, 2003 (aged 84); Austin, Texas, U.S.
- Listed height: 6 ft 2 in (1.88 m)
- Listed weight: 184 lb (83 kg)

Career information
- High school: Beaumont
- College: Sam Houston State (1938-1941)
- NFL draft: 1942: 11th round, 92nd overall pick

Career history
- Cleveland Rams (1942); Detroit Lions (1943); Los Angeles Bulldogs (1946)

Career NFL statistics
- Receptions: 29
- Receiving yards: 489
- Touchdowns: 4
- Stats at Pro Football Reference

John Benjamin Hightower (December 5, 1918 – January 1, 2003) was an American professional football player.

Hightower was born in Beaumont, Texas, in 1918. He attended Beaumont High School and played college football at Sam Houston State from 1938 to 1941. He was also a champion hurdler for the Sam Houston track team.

He was selected by the Cleveland Rams in the 11th round with the 92nd pick of the 1942 NFL draft. He played as an end for the Rams, on both offense and defense, during the 1942 season. He appeared in 10 games for the Rams, two as a starter, caught 19 passes for 317 yards and scored three touchdowns.

In 1943, he was a starting end for the Detroit Lions. He appeared in eight games for the Lions, seven as a starter, and caught 10 passes for 172 yards and a touchdown. His 1943 season ended early when he had a recurrence of malaria from which he was first stricken in high school.

Hightower missed the 1944 and 1946 seasons while serving in the United States Navy during World War II. He played for the Camp Peary football team in 1944 and was selected as a first-team end on the Associated Press Mid-Atlantic Service team.

After the war, he coached football at Sam Houston. He also played during the 1946 season in the Pacific Coast Football League for the Los Angeles Bulldogs and Hollywood Bears.

Hightower was married for 62 years. He lived in Austin, Texas, from 1960 until his death 2003 at age 84. He worked as a real estate professional working with ranch and far properties. He was inducted into the Sam Houston Bearkat Hall off Fame in 1989.
