= 1941 All-Pacific Coast football team =

American all-star college football team

The 1941 All-Pacific Coast football team consists of American football players chosen by various organizations for All-Pacific Coast teams for the 1941 college football season. The organizations selecting teams in 1941 included the Associated Press (AP) and the United Press (UP).

The 1941 Oregon State Beavers football team won the Pacific Coast Conference (PCC) championship with an 8-2 record, finished the season ranked No. 12 in the final AP Poll, and was represented on the first team by center Quentin Greenough on the AP and UP teams. The 1941 Washington State Cougars football team compiled a 6-4 record, was ranked No. 19 in the final AP Poll, and landed three players on either the AP or UP first teams: halfback Billy Sewell (AP, UP) and ends Nick Susoeff (AP, UP) and Dale Gentry (AP). Despite finishing in fourth place, the 1941 Stanford Indians football team also had three players receiving first-team honors: quarterback Frankie Albert (AP, UP), guard Chuck Taylor (AP, UP), and end Fred Meyer (UP),

While no players from teams outside the PCC received first-team honors from the AP or UP, three players from the 1941 Santa Clara Broncos football team received second-team honors.

== All-Pacific Coast selections ==
=== Backs ===
- Frankie Albert, Stanford (AP-1, UP-1)
- Pete Kmetovic, Stanford (AP-1, UP-1)
- Bill Sewell, Washington State (AP-1, UP-1)
- Bobby Robertson, USC (AP-1, UP-1)
- Don Durdan, Oregon State (AP-2, UP-2)
- Curt Mecham, Oregon (AP-2, UP-2)
- Jack Stackpool, Washington (AP-3, UP-2)
- Tom Roblin, Oregon (AP-2)
- Bob Kennedy, Washington State (AP-2)
- Ken Casanega, Santa Clara (UP-2)
- Al Derian, California (AP-3)
- George Peters, Oregon State (AP-3)
- Eso Naranche, Montana (AP-3)

=== Ends ===
- Nick Susoeff, Washington State (AP-1, UP-1)
- Dale Gentry, Washington State (AP-1, UP-2)
- Fred Meyer, Stanford (UP-1, AP-2)
- Alyn Beals, Santa Clara (AP-2, UP-2)
- George Zellick, Oregon State (AP-3)
- Earl Younglove, Washington (AP-3)

=== Tackles ===
- Bob Reinhard, California (AP-1, UP-1)
- Glen Conley, Washington (AP-1, UP-1)
- Bruno Banducci, Stanford (AP-2, UP-2)
- Joe Beckman, Washington State (AP-3, UP-2)
- Ed Stamm, Stanford (AP-2)
- Don Willer, USC (AP-3)

=== Guards ===
- Ray Frankowski, Washington (AP-1, UP-1)
- Chuck Taylor, Stanford (AP-1, UP-1) (College Football Hall of Fame)
- Rupert Thornton, Santa Clara (AP-2, UP-2)
- William Halveston, Oregon State (AP-2)
- Ray Segale, Oregon (AP-3, UP-2)
- Martin Chaves, Oregon State (AP-3)

=== Centers ===
- Quentin Greenough, Oregon State (AP-1, UP-1)
- Walter Harrison, Washington (AP-2, UP-2)
- Vic Lindskog, Stanford (AP-3)

== Key ==
AP = 17th annual Associated Press team selected "by sports writers, coaches and officials representing every section of the Far West"

UP = United Press, selected by sports editors of UP client newspapers

Bold = Consensus first-team selection of both the AP and UP

== See also ==
- 1941 College Football All-America Team
