= 1941 Georgetown Hoyas football team =

American college football season

1941 Georgetown Hoyas football
- Conference: Independent
- Record: 5–4
- Head coach: Jack Hagerty (10th season)
- Captain: Game captains
- Home stadium: Griffith Stadium

1941 Southern college football independents records
| | Conf. | | | Overall |
| Team | W | L | T | W | | L | | T |
|---|---|---|---|---|---|---|---|---|
| East Carolina | | – | | 7 | – | 0 | – | 0 |
| Delaware | | – | | 7 | – | 0 | – | 1 |
| Virginia | | – | | 8 | – | 1 | – | 0 |
| Marshall | | – | | 7 | – | 1 | – | 0 |
| No. 10 Navy | | – | | 7 | – | 1 | – | 1 |
| Georgetown | | – | | 5 | – | 4 | – | 0 |
| Western Maryland | | – | | 3 | – | 4 | – | 1 |
| West Virginia | | – | | 4 | – | 6 | – | 0 |
| Roanoke | | – | | 3 | – | 5 | – | 0 |
| Sewanee | | – | | 2 | – | 5 | – | 0 |
| Delaware State | | – | | 1 | – | 4 | – | 0 |
| Georgia Teachers | | – | | 2 | – | 8 | – | 0 |
Rankings from AP Poll

The 1941 Georgetown Hoyas football team was an American football team that represented Georgetown University as an independent during the 1941 college football season. In its 10th year under head coach Jack Hagerty, the team compiled a 5–4 and outscored opponents by a total of 114 to 61.

Tackle Al Blozis was selected by the Associated Press as a first-team player on the 1941 All-Eastern football team. Blozis was later inducted into the College Football Hall of Fame.

Georgetown was ranked at No. 70 (out of 681 teams) in the final rankings under the Litkenhous Difference by Score System for 1941.

Georgetown played its home games at Griffith Stadium in Washington, D.C.

== Schedule ==
| Date | Opponent | Site | Result | Attendance | Source |
|---|---|---|---|---|---|
| September 26 | Ole Miss | Griffith Stadium; Washington, D.C. | W 16–6 | | |
| October 4 | at VPI | Miles Stadium; Blacksburg, VA | L 0–3 | 5,000 | |
| October 10 | at Temple | Temple Stadium; Philadelphia, PA | L 7–17 | 33,000 | |
| October 17 | George Washington | Griffith Stadium; Washington, D.C. | W 25–0 | 16,000 | |
| October 25 | at Boston College | Fenway Park; Boston, MA | L 6–14 | 22,000 | |
| November 8 | Maryland | Griffith Stadium; Washington, D.C. | W 26–0 | 7,500 | |
| November 15 | NC State | Griffith Stadium; Washington, D.C. | W 20–7 | 10,000 | |
| November 20 | at Manhattan | Polo Grounds; New York, NY | W 7–0 | 12,066 | |
| November 29 | at Xavier | Xavier Stadium; Cincinnati, OH | L 7–14 | 12,000 | |
