= Chet Wetterlund =

American football player (1918–1944)

No. 40
- Positions: Halfback, defensive back

Personal information
- Born: March 19, 1918; Chicago, Illinois, U.S.
- Died: September 5, 1944 (aged 26); Atlantic Ocean, off New Jersey, U.S.
- Listed height: 6 ft 2 in (1.88 m)
- Listed weight: 185 lb (84 kg)

Career information
- High school: Morgan Park (Chicago)
- College: Illinois Wesleyan (1938-1941)
- NFL draft: 1942: 9th round, 74th overall pick

Career history
- Chicago Cardinals (1942)*; Detroit Lions (1942)
- * Offseason or practice squad member only

Career NFL statistics
- Passing attempts: 44
- Passing completions: 13
- Completion percentage: 29.5%
- TD–INT: 0–10
- Passing yards: 230
- Passer rating: 9.3
- Stats at Pro Football Reference

Chester Jerome Wetterlund (March 19, 1918 – September 5, 1944) was an American professional football halfback who played one season in the National Football League (NFL) for the Detroit Lions. He played college football at Illinois Wesleyan University, where he was a team captain and junior class president.

Wetterlund was drafted in the ninth round by the Chicago Cardinals in the 1942 NFL draft before being released and signed by the Lions. He failed to throw a touchdown pass, instead having ten interceptions, and recorded just six rushing yards as the Lions went 0–11. With World War II taking place, he enlisted in the United States Navy Air Corps at the end of the season and received his pilot certifications on March 7, 1943.

He was assigned to the naval air station at Wildwood, New Jersey. On September 5, 1944, he and Aviation Radioman Third Class Tom Elmer Smith were killed in a plane crash off the New Jersey coast on a routine training flight in a Curtiss SB2C Helldiver; the plane experienced trouble, and he was forced to ditch in the sea. He was killed instantly, and a five-day search by the Navy failed to find him. The cause of the crash is unknown, though authors Todd Anton and Bill Nowlin suggested mechanical issues or the Helldiver's difficult handling compared to its predecessor Douglas SBD Dauntless as possibilities. Wetterlund was survived by his fiancée Myra Jane Rodgers, who was in WAVES.
