= 1941 Lehigh Engineers football team =

American college football season

1941 Lehigh Engineers football
- Conference: Middle Three Conference
- Record: 0–6–3 (0–2 Middle Three)
- Head coach: Glen Harmeson (8th season)
- Captain: Henry Reuwer
- Home stadium: Taylor Stadium

1941 Middle Three Conference football standings
	Conf.					Overall
Team	W		L		T	W		L		T
Lafayette $	2	–	0	–	0	5	–	4	–	0
Rutgers	1	–	1	–	0	7	–	2	–	0
Lehigh	0	–	2	–	0	0	–	6	–	3
$ – Conference champion

The 1941 Lehigh Engineers football team was an American football team that represented Lehigh University during the 1941 college football season. In its eighth and final season under head coach Glen Harmeson, the team compiled a 0–6–3 record, and lost both games against its Middle Three Conference rivals. This was Lehigh's first winless campaign since its four-game, four-loss inaugural season in 1884. Lehigh played home games at Taylor Stadium in Bethlehem, Pennsylvania.

== Schedule ==
Date	Opponent	Site	Result	Attendance	Source
September 27	Hartwick*	Taylor Stadium; Bethlehem, PA	T 13–13		
October 4	Case*	Taylor Stadium; Bethlehem, PA	L 26–33	4,200	
October 11	at Rutgers	Rutgers Stadium; Piscataway, NJ	L 6–16	10,000	
October 18	Ursinus*	Taylor Stadium; Bethlehem, PA	T 7–7	6,000	
October 25	at Penn State*	New Beaver Field; State College, PA	L 6–40	12,000	
November 1	at Buffalo*	Rotary Field; Buffalo, NY	T 0–0		
November 8	Muhlenberg*	Taylor Stadium; Bethlehem, PA	L 2–7	6,000	
November 15	at Virginia*	Scott Stadium; Charlottesville, VA	L 0–34		
November 22	Lafayette	Taylor Stadium; Bethlehem, PA (rivalry)	L 7–47		
*Non-conference game
