= George Benson (American football) =

American football player (1919–2001)

No. 73
- Position: Halfback

Personal information
- Born: May 7, 1919; Madison, Indiana, U.S.
- Died: August 24, 2001 (aged 82); Cape Coral, Florida, U.S.
- Listed height: 6 ft 1 in (1.85 m)
- Listed weight: 205 lb (93 kg)

Career information
- High school: Hammond (Hammond, Indiana)
- College: LSU; Northwestern (1938–1941)
- NFL draft: 1942: 19th round, 179th overall pick

Career history
- Brooklyn Dodgers (1947)

Career AAFC statistics
- Rushing yards: 5
- Rushing average: 2.5
- Stats at Pro Football Reference

George Nathan Benson (May 7, 1919 – August 24, 2001) was a professional American football halfback. He was a member of the Brooklyn Dodgers team of the All-America Football Conference (AAFC).
