= Ken Casanega =

American football player (1921–2021)

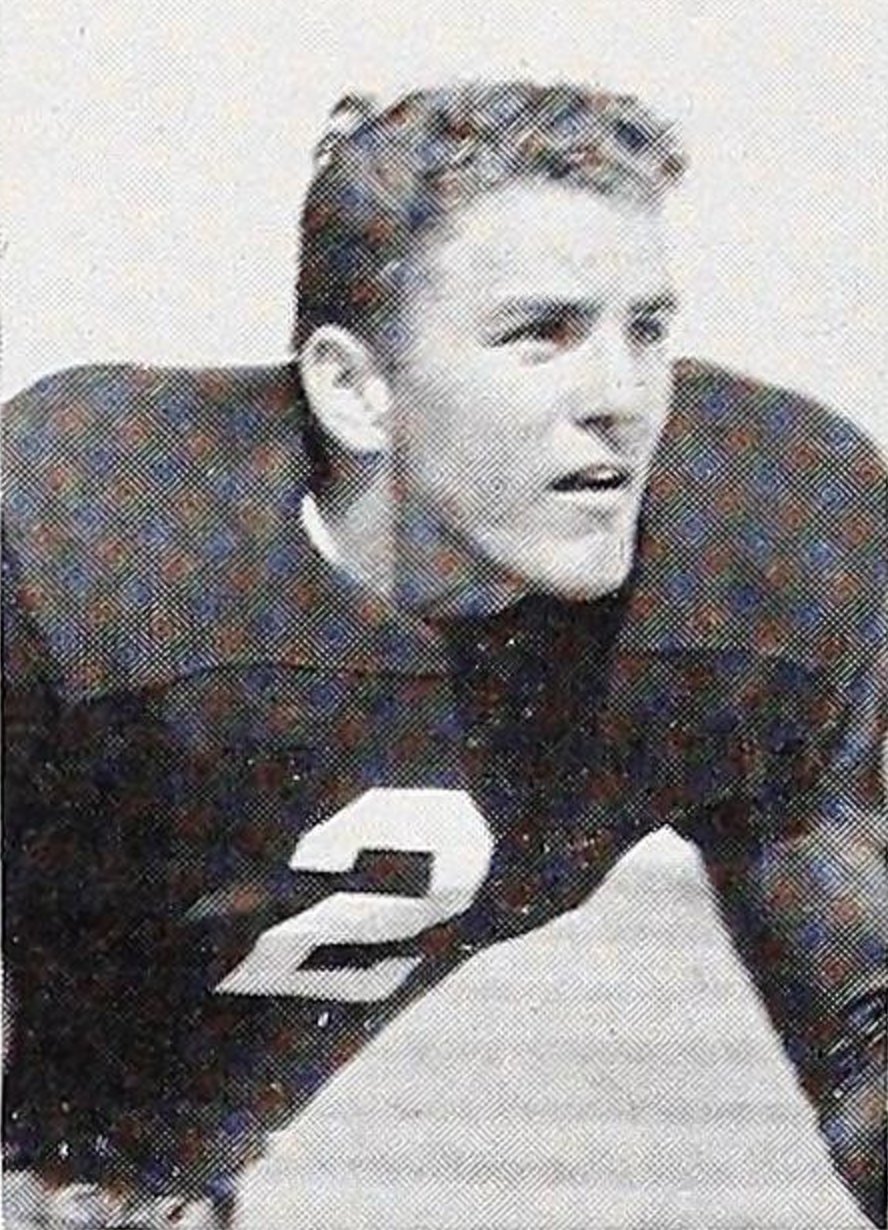
- Casanega pictured in The Last Roundup 1942, Santa Clara yearbook

No. 83
- Positions: Quarterback, Defensive back, Halfback

Personal information
- Born: February 18, 1921; Alameda County, California, U.S.
- Died: October 10, 2021 (aged 100); Medford, Oregon, U.S.
- Listed height: 5 ft 11 in (1.80 m)
- Listed weight: 175 lb (79 kg)

Career information
- High school: Castlemont (Oakland, California)
- College: Santa Clara (1938-1941)
- NFL draft: 1942: 3rd round, 16th overall pick

Career history
- San Francisco 49ers (1946, 1948)

Awards and highlights
- Second-team All-PCC (1941)

Career AAFC statistics
- Rushing yards: 90
- Rushing average: 3.1
- Receptions: 5
- Receiving yards: 102
- Total touchdowns: 2
- Stats at Pro Football Reference

Kenneth Thomas Casanega (February 18, 1921 – October 10, 2021) was an American professional football player who was a quarterback for two seasons with the San Francisco 49ers of the All-America Football Conference (AAFC). He played college football at Santa Clara University, having previously attended Castlemont High School in Oakland, California. He later was a school administrator.

== College career ==
Kenneth Casanega attended Santa Clara University from 1938 to 1942, and played halfback for the Broncos' football team. In 1965, he was inducted into the university's athletic hall of fame.

== Naval service ==
Casanega was picked with the 3rd overall pick by the Pittsburgh Steelers at the 1942 NFL draft. He turned down the offer to serve his country as an U.S. Naval aviator during World War II. Lt. (j.g.) Casanega served as a flier aboard an aircraft carrier in the South Pacific, taking part in raids over the Philippines and around Japan.

== AAFC ==
Casanega joined the original San Francisco 49ers off the All-America Football Conference in 1946. He played in all 14 games (starting 5) as a running back, with 29 rushes for 90 yards and 1 touchdown, plus 5 receptions for 102 yards and 1 touchdown. He also returned 18 punts for a 13.8-yard average and three kicks for a 20.3 average. As a defensive back in 1946, he tallied 8 interceptions. In 1948 he played in 1 game, his last in the AAFC, with no statistics.

== Later life ==
Casanega became a school coach and administrator, and a principal for 15 years, at Napa High School. In the early 1970s he became superintendent in the Hollister School District in Hollister, California. He retired in 1981 and turned 100 in 2021.

Upon the death of Cecil Souders on August 31, 2021, Casanega became the oldest living NFL player. Casanega died in Medford, Oregon on October 10, 2021, at the age of 100.
