= 1941 Penn Quakers football team =

American college football season

1941 Penn Quakers football

Ivy League champion
- Conference: Ivy League

Ranking
- AP: No. 15
- Record: 7–1 (5–0 Ivy)
- Head coach: George Munger (4th season)
- Home stadium: Franklin Field

1941 Ivy League football standings
	Conf.					Overall
Team	W		L		T	W		L		T
No. 15 Penn $	5	–	0	–	0	7	–	1	–	0
Columbia	3	–	1	–	0	3	–	5	–	0
Harvard	4	–	2	–	0	5	–	2	–	1
Cornell	3	–	2	–	0	5	–	3	–	0
Dartmouth	2	–	2	–	0	5	–	4	–	0
Brown	1	–	2	–	0	5	–	4	–	0
Princeton	1	–	4	–	0	2	–	6	–	0
Yale	0	–	6	–	0	1	–	7	–	0
$ – Conference champion; Rankings from AP Poll

The 1941 Penn Quakers football team was an American football team that represented the University of Pennsylvania in the Ivy League during the 1941 college football season.

In its fourth season under head coach George Munger, the team compiled a 7–1 record, won the Ivy League championship, outscored opponents by a total of 180 to 55, and was ranked No. 15 in the final AP Poll. The team's lone setback was a 13–6 loss to Navy.

Back Gene Davis was selected by the Associated Press as a first-team player on the 1941 All-Eastern football team, and end Bernie Kuczynski was named to the second team. Other key players included halfback Bob Odell, fullback Bert Stiff, and Bob Brundage.

Munger was Penn's head coach for 16 years; he was inducted into the College Football Hall of Fame in 1976.

== Schedule ==
Date	Opponent	Rank	Site	Result	Attendance	Source
October 4	Harvard		Franklin Field; Philadelphia, PA (rivalry)	W 19–0		
October 11	at Yale		Yale Bowl; New Haven, CT	W 28–13	30,000	
October 18	at Princeton	No. 11	Palmer Stadium; Princeton, NJ (rivalry)	W 23–0	31,500	
October 25	Maryland*	No. 12	Franklin Field; Philadelphia, PA	W 55–6	40,000	
November 1	at No. 11 Navy*	No. 8	Franklin Field; Philadelphia, PA	L 6–13	74,000	
November 8	Columbia	No. 19	Franklin Field; Philadelphia, PA	W 19–16	50,000	
November 15	No. 19 Army*	No. 14	Franklin Field; Philadelphia, PA	W 14–7	70,000	
November 22	Cornell	No. 13	Franklin Field; Philadelphia, PA (rivalry)	W 16–0	74,000	
*Non-conference game; Rankings from AP Poll released prior to the game

== Rankings ==
Ranking movements Legend: ██ Increase in ranking ██ Decrease in ranking ( ) = First-place votes
	Week							
Poll	1	2	3	4	5	6	7	Final
AP	11	12	8 (1)	19	14	13	13	15
