= Al DeMao =

American football player (1920–2008)

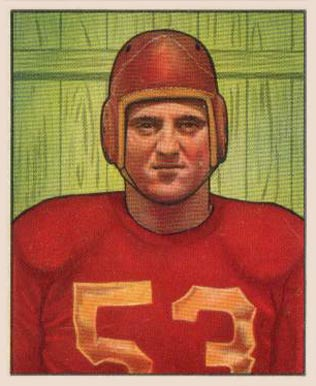
- DeMao on a 1950 Bowman football card

No. 53
- Positions: Center, linebacker

Personal information
- Born: February 29, 1920; New Kensington, Pennsylvania, U.S.
- Died: February 1, 2008 (aged 87); Glen Burnie, Maryland, U.S.
- Listed height: 6 ft 2 in (1.88 m)
- Listed weight: 214 lb (97 kg)

Career information
- High school: Arnold (PA)
- College: Duquesne
- NFL draft: 1942: 11th round, 96th overall pick

Career history
- Washington Redskins (1945–1953)

Awards and highlights
- 70 Greatest Redskins; Second-team All-American (1941); Second-team All-Eastern (1941)

Career NFL statistics
- Games played: 97
- Interceptions: 8
- Fumble recoveries: 5
- Stats at Pro Football Reference

Albert Marcellus DeMao (February 29, 1920 – February 1, 2008) was an American professional football player who was a center for the Washington Redskins of the National Football League (NFL) from 1945 to 1953. He played college football for the Duquesne Dukes and was selected in the 11th round of the 1942 NFL draft.

== Life and career ==
DeMao was born in New Kensington, Pennsylvania. He attended Duquesne University, graduating in 1942. He was a member of the university's undefeated 1941 football team, played in the 1941 Blue-Gray Game, and played in the 1941 College All-Star Game. Drafted by the Washington Redskins, he was unable to serve because he was drafted by the United States Navy instead. Commissioned a lieutenant, DeMao commanded a landing craft during the Normandy invasion, making nine dangerous trips to the beach to deliver soldiers to the shore. Discharged from the Navy in the fall of 1945, he joined the Redskins mid-season and played nine years for the team.

Since most professional football players received only minimal pay in the 1950s, DeMao took up employment in the off-season with liquor distributor Milton S. Kronheim & Co. After retiring from football in 1954, DeMao remained with the company, rising to vice president of sales.

DeMao remained active in NFL affairs in retirement. He founded the Redskins Alumni Association (a social and charitable organization for former Washington Redskins players) in 1957, NFL Alumni (a charitable organization to aid needy former NFL players) in 1967, and the Redskins Welcome Home Luncheon (a social event for players which kicks off each Redskins season).

DeMao married Marcella DeMao, but the couple had no children. DeMao greatly enjoyed working with children, however. He was active in Special Olympics and the Boys & Girls Clubs of America, assisted with the St. John's College High School football team, and coached football teams with the Boys Club of America and the Catholic Youth Organization. He also raised funds for the Muscular Dystrophy Association, the National Multiple Sclerosis Society, and the Darrell Green Youth Life Foundation.

DeMao retired from Kronheim & Co. in 1986, shortly after his wife Marcella died early in the year. He married Violet DeMao at the end of 1986. Al DeMao died of pneumonia at Baltimore Washington Medical Center in Glen Burnie, Maryland, on February 1, 2008. He was survived by his wife, and interred at Gate of Heaven Cemetery in Silver Spring, Maryland.
