= 1941 East Carolina Pirates football team =

American college football season

1941 East Carolina Pirates football
- Conference: Independent
- Record: 7–0
- Head coach: John Christenbury (2nd season)
- Home stadium: Guy Smith Stadium

1941 Southern college football independents records
	Conf.			Overall
Team	W	L	T	W		L		T
East Carolina		–		7	–	0	–	0
Delaware		–		7	–	0	–	1
Virginia		–		8	–	1	–	0
Marshall		–		7	–	1	–	0
No. 10 Navy		–		7	–	1	–	1
Georgetown		–		5	–	4	–	0
Western Maryland		–		3	–	4	–	1
West Virginia		–		4	–	6	–	0
Roanoke		–		3	–	5	–	0
Sewanee		–		2	–	5	–	0
Delaware State		–		1	–	4	–	0
Georgia Teachers		–		2	–	8	–	0
Rankings from AP Poll

The 1941 East Carolina Pirates football team was an American football team that represented East Carolina Teachers College (now known as East Carolina University) as an independent during the 1941 college football season. In their second season under head coach John Christenbury, the team compiled a 7–0 record.

== Schedule ==
Date	Opponent	Site	Result	Source
September 27	Tusculum	Guy Smith Stadium; Greenville, NC	W 31–0	
October 10	Portsmouth Apprentice School	Guy Smith Stadium; Greenville, NC	W 39–0	
October 18	Western Carolina	Guy Smith Stadium; Greenville, NC	W 19–6	
October 24	Portsmouth Naval Hospital	Guy Smith Stadium; Greenville, NC	W 30–0	
October 31	at Erskine	Due West, SC	W 14–7	
November 8	at Bergen Junior College	Teaneck, NJ	W 13–7	
November 15	at Belmont Abbey	Gastonia H.S. Stadium; Gastonia, NC	W 13–0	
