= 1941 Roanoke Maroons football team =

American college football season

1941 Roanoke Maroons football
- Conference: Independent
- Record: 3–5
- Head coach: Gordon C. White (12th season)
- Home stadium: College Field

1941 Southern college football independents records
| | Conf. | | | Overall |
| Team | W | L | T | W | | L | | T |
|---|---|---|---|---|---|---|---|---|
| East Carolina | | – | | 7 | – | 0 | – | 0 |
| Delaware | | – | | 7 | – | 0 | – | 1 |
| Virginia | | – | | 8 | – | 1 | – | 0 |
| Marshall | | – | | 7 | – | 1 | – | 0 |
| No. 10 Navy | | – | | 7 | – | 1 | – | 1 |
| Georgetown | | – | | 5 | – | 4 | – | 0 |
| Western Maryland | | – | | 3 | – | 4 | – | 1 |
| West Virginia | | – | | 4 | – | 6 | – | 0 |
| Roanoke | | – | | 3 | – | 5 | – | 0 |
| Sewanee | | – | | 2 | – | 5 | – | 0 |
| Delaware State | | – | | 1 | – | 4 | – | 0 |
| Georgia Teachers | | – | | 2 | – | 8 | – | 0 |
Rankings from AP Poll

The 1941 Roanoke Maroons football team represented Roanoke College as an independent during the 1941 college football season. Led by 12th-year head coach Gordon C. White, the Maroons compiled an overall record of 3–5.

== Schedule ==
| Date | Opponent | Site | Result | Attendance | Source |
|---|---|---|---|---|---|
| September 26 | Guilford | College Field; Salem, VA | W 14–0 | | |
| October 3 | Lenoir–Rhyne | College Field; Salem, VA | L 13–16 | | |
| October 10 | Tusculum | College Field; Salem, VA | W 7–0 | | |
| October 17 | at High Point | Millis Stadium; High Point, NC | W 12–6 | | |
| October 24 | at Apprentice | Apprentice Field; Newport News, VA | L 7–26 | 3,900 | |
| November 1 | at King | Bristol Municipal Stadium; Bristol, TN | L 0–14 | | |
| November 8 | at Hampden–Sydney | Hampden-Sydney, VA | L 2–19 | 4,000 | |
| November 14 | Catawba | College Field; Salem, VA | L 0–20 | 500 | |
