= Ted Williams (back) =

American football player (1916–1993)

No. 31, 77, 22
- Position: Back

Personal information
- Born: June 3, 1916; Bay Bulls, Newfoundland
- Died: October 30, 1993 (aged 77); Gloucester, Massachusetts, U.S.
- Listed height: 5 ft 11 in (1.80 m)
- Listed weight: 183 lb (83 kg)

Career information
- High school: Gloucester
- College: Notre Dame (1938); Boston College (1941)
- NFL draft: 1942: 3rd round, 18th overall pick

Career history
- Philadelphia Eagles (1942); Boston Yanks (1944)

Career NFL statistics
- Rushing yards: 196
- Rushing average: 1.9
- Receptions: 15
- Receiving yards: 86
- Total touchdowns: 3
- Stats at Pro Football Reference

Theodore Patrick Williams (June 3, 1916 – October 30, 1993) was an American football back in the National Football League (NFL). He played for the Philadelphia Eagles (1942) and the Boston Yanks (1944).
