= Jim Lansing =

American football player and coach (1919–2000)

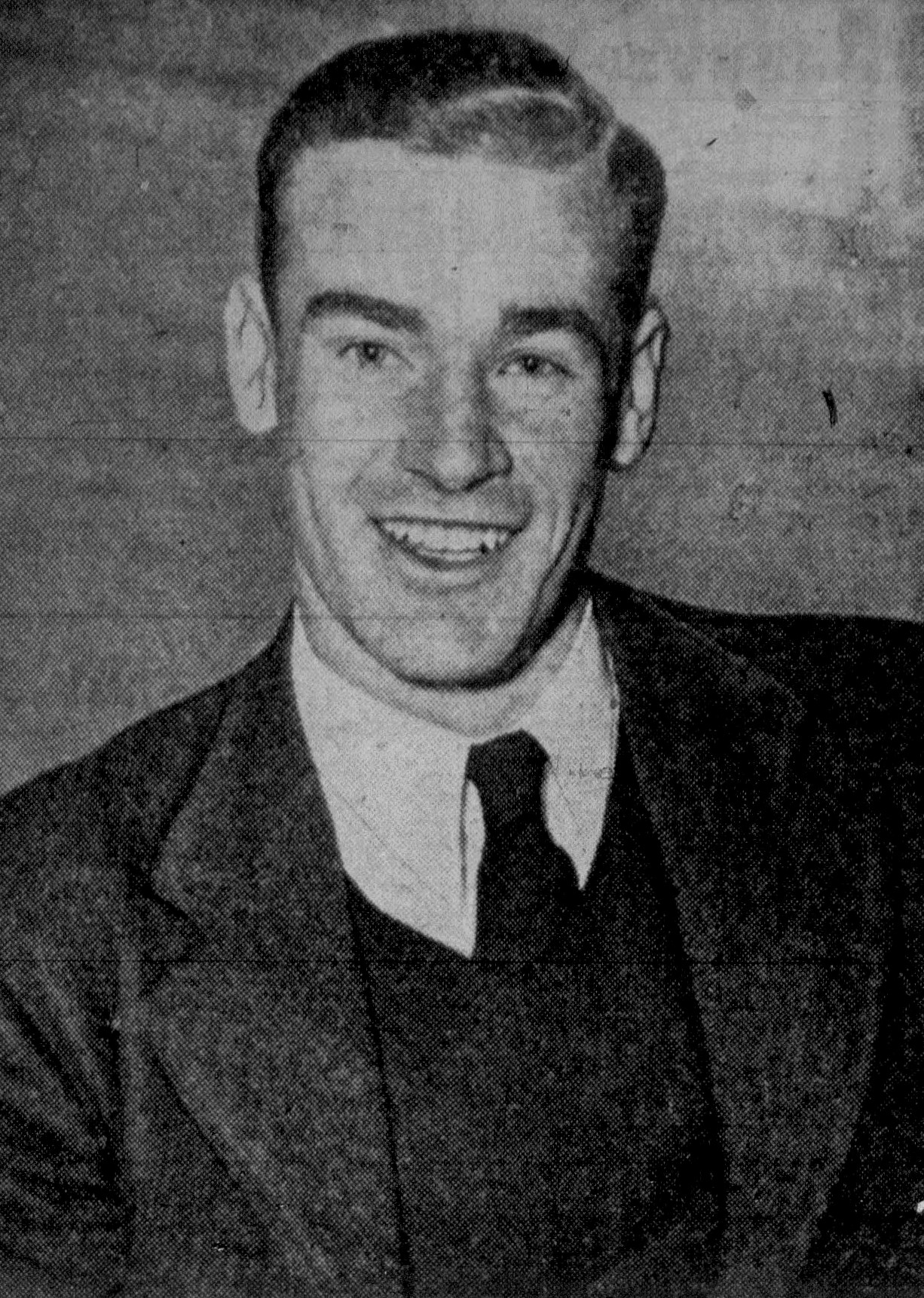
- Lansing, circa 1941–42

Biographical details
- Born: September 16, 1919; Pelham, New York, U.S.
- Died: December 2, 2000 (aged 81); New Rochelle, New York, U.S.

Playing career
- 1940–1942: Fordham
- 1946: Fordham
- Position: End

Coaching career (HC unless noted)
- 1947–1954: Fordham (assistant)
- 1955–1961: Blessed Sacrament HS (NY)
- 1964–1971: Fordham

Head coaching record
- Overall: 30–22–3 (college)

Accomplishments and honors

Awards
- First-team All-American (1941); Second-team All-Eastern (1941)

James Samuel Lansing (September 16, 1919 – December 2, 2000) was a college football player and coach at Fordham University. As an All-American end in the 1940s, Lansing participated in the 1941 Cotton Bowl Classic and 1942 Sugar Bowl. Prior to the start of his senior season he was called into duty by the Navy Air Corps to fight in World War II as a fighter pilot. Upon return to Fordham for the 1946 season, Lansing injured his shoulder in the first game, ending his football playing career.

Lansing then served as an assistant coach for Fordham from 1947 through the 1954 seasons, after which the university dropped the football program. Several years after a six-year coaching stint at Blessed Sacrament High School in New Rochelle, Lansing returned to Fordham to take over as the new head football coach. In eight seasons, Lansing compiled an overall record of 30–22–3. He stayed at Fordham to serve as an assistant athletic director and the director of intramural athletics.

In his early years, Lansing grew up in Pelham, New York and graduated from Pelham Memorial High School. He then graduated from Seton Hall Preparatory School in South Orange, New Jersey before attending Fordham.

== Head coaching record ==
=== College ===
Year	Team	Overall	Conference	Standing	Bowl/playoffs
Fordham Rams (Independent) (1965–1971)
1965	Fordham	4–2			
1966	Fordham	1–5			
1967	Fordham	5–3			
1968	Fordham	7–1			
1969	Fordham	5–2–1			
1970	Fordham	5–1–2			
1971	Fordham	2–7			
Fordham:		30–22–3			
Total:		30–22–3			
