= 1941 Harvard Crimson football team =

American college football season

1941 Harvard Crimson football
- Conference: Ivy League
- Record: 5–2–1 (4–2 Ivy)
- Head coach: Dick Harlow (7th season)
- Home stadium: Harvard Stadium

1941 Ivy League football standings
	Conf.					Overall
Team	W		L		T	W		L		T
No. 15 Penn $	5	–	0	–	0	7	–	1	–	0
Columbia	3	–	1	–	0	3	–	5	–	0
Harvard	4	–	2	–	0	5	–	2	–	1
Cornell	3	–	2	–	0	5	–	3	–	0
Dartmouth	2	–	2	–	0	5	–	4	–	0
Brown	1	–	2	–	0	5	–	4	–	0
Princeton	1	–	4	–	0	2	–	6	–	0
Yale	0	–	6	–	0	1	–	7	–	0
$ – Conference champion; Rankings from AP Poll

The 1941 Harvard Crimson football team was an American football team that represented Harvard University in the Ivy League during the 1941 college football season. In its seventh season under head coach Dick Harlow, the team compiled a 5–2–1 record and outscored opponents by a total of 70 to 43. The team was ranked No. 17 in the AP Poll released on November 10, 1941, and No. 19 in the poll released on November 24, 1941. The team was unranked in the final AP Poll but was ranked at No. 32 (out of 681 teams) in the final rankings under the Litkenhous Difference by Score System for 1941.

Harvard's Endicott Peabody won the 1941 Knute Rockne Memorial Trophy as the best collegiate lineman and was the only player to be unanimously selected by all nine official selectors as a first-team player on the 1941 All-America team. Peabody and end Loren MacKinney were also selected by the Associated Press as first-team players on the 1941 All-Eastern football team. Peabody was later inducted into the College Football Hall of Fame and served as Governor of Massachusetts.

== Schedule ==
Date	Opponent	Rank	Site	Result	Attendance	Source
October 4	at Penn		Franklin Field; Philadelphia, PA (rivalry)	L 0–19	40,000	
October 11	Cornell		Harvard Stadium; Boston, MA	L 0–7	20,000	
October 18	Dartmouth		Harvard Stadium; Boston, MA (rivalry)	W 7–0	37,000	
October 25	No. 5 Navy*		Harvard Stadium; Boston, MA	W 20–6	40,000	
November 1	at Princeton		Palmer Stadium; Princeton, NJ (rivalry)	W 6–4	18,000	
November 8	No. 11 Army*		Harvard Stadium; Boston, MA	W 20–6	53,000	
November 15	Brown	No. 17	Harvard Stadium; Boston, MA	W 23–7	20,000	
November 22	Yale		Harvard Stadium; Boston, MA (rivalry)	W 14–0	53,000	
*Non-conference game; Rankings from AP Poll released prior to the game

== Rankings ==
Ranking movements Legend: ██ Increase in ranking ██ Decrease in ranking — = Not ranked
	Week							
Poll	1	2	3	4	5	6	7	Final
AP	—	—	—	—	17	—	19	—
