= Nick Susoeff =

American football player (1921–1967)

No. 58
- Position: End

Personal information
- Born: April 15, 1921; Umapine, Oregon, U.S.
- Died: January 31, 1967 (aged 45); Santa Clara County, California, U.S.
- Listed height: 6 ft 1 in (1.85 m)
- Listed weight: 215 lb (98 kg)

Career information
- High school: Theodore Roosevelt (Los Angeles, California)
- College: Washington State (1939–1942)
- NFL draft: 1943: 6th round, 48th overall pick

Career history

Playing
- San Francisco 49ers (1946–1949)

Coaching
- New York Yanks (1951) Ends coach

Awards and highlights
- Third-team All-American (1941); 2× First-team All-PCC (1941, 1942)

Career AAFC statistics
- Receptions: 61
- Receiving yards: 610
- Touchdowns: 4
- Stats at Pro Football Reference

Nicholas Peter Susoeff (April 15, 1921 – January 31, 1967) was an American professional football player who was an end for four seasons with the San Francisco 49ers of the All-America Football Conference. He played college football for the Washington State Cougars. Susoeff was an original member of the 49ers.

Susoeff played in 44 games, starting in 29, for the 49ers. Over the course of his career he caught 61 balls for 610 yards, scoring four touchdowns.

After the end of his playing career with the 49ers in 1949, Susoeff joined the staff of the New York Yanks of the National Football League (NFL) as an assistant coach for one season.

Susoeff died January 31, 1967, at his home in Palo Alto, California of a heart attack.
