= 1941 Brown Bears football team =

American college football season

1941 Brown Bears football
- Conference: Ivy League
- Record: 5–4 (1–2 Ivy)
- Head coach: Skip Stahley (1st season)
- Home stadium: Brown Stadium

1941 Ivy League football standings
	Conf.					Overall
Team	W		L		T	W		L		T
No. 15 Penn $	5	–	0	–	0	7	–	1	–	0
Columbia	3	–	1	–	0	3	–	5	–	0
Harvard	4	–	2	–	0	5	–	2	–	1
Cornell	3	–	2	–	0	5	–	3	–	0
Dartmouth	2	–	2	–	0	5	–	4	–	0
Brown	1	–	2	–	0	5	–	4	–	0
Princeton	1	–	4	–	0	2	–	6	–	0
Yale	0	–	6	–	0	1	–	7	–	0
$ – Conference champion; Rankings from AP Poll

The 1941 Brown Bears football team was an American football team that represented Brown University in the Ivy League during the 1941 college football season. In its first season under head coach Skip Stahley, Brown compiled a 5–4 record and outscored opponents by a total of 102 to 81.

Halfback Bob Margarita was selected by the United Press as a first-team player on the 1941 All-New England football team. He later played in the National Football League for the Chicago Bears.

Brown was ranked at No. 98 (out of 681 teams) in the final rankings under the Litkenhous Difference by Score System for 1941.

The team played its home games at Brown Stadium in Providence, Rhode Island.

== Schedule ==
Date	Opponent	Site	Result	Attendance	Source
September 27	Wesleyan*	Brown Stadium; Providence, RI	W 20–6		
October 4	at Columbia	Baker Field; New York, NY	L 6–13	10,000	
October 11	Rhode Island State*	Brown Stadium; Providence, RI (rivalry)	W 14–7	18,000	
October 18	Tufts*	Brown Stadium; Providence, RI	W 28–6		
October 25	at Lafayette*	Fisher Field; Easton, PA	W 13–0	8,000	
November 1	at Yale	Yale Bowl; New Haven, CT	W 7–0	9,000	
November 8	Holy Cross*	Brown Stadium; Providence, RI	L 0–13		
November 15	at No. 17 Harvard	Harvard Stadium; Boston, MA	L 7–23	20,000	
November 22	Rutgers*	Brown Stadium; Providence, RI	L 7–13	15,000	
*Non-conference game; Rankings from AP Poll released prior to the game
