= 1941 Sewanee Tigers football team =

American college football season

1941 Sewanee Tigers football
- Conference: Independent
- Record: 2–5
- Head coach: Jenks Gillem (2nd season)
- Home stadium: Hardee Field

1941 Southern college football independents records
	Conf.			Overall
Team	W	L	T	W		L		T
East Carolina		–		7	–	0	–	0
Delaware		–		7	–	0	–	1
Virginia		–		8	–	1	–	0
Marshall		–		7	–	1	–	0
No. 10 Navy		–		7	–	1	–	1
Georgetown		–		5	–	4	–	0
Western Maryland		–		3	–	4	–	1
West Virginia		–		4	–	6	–	0
Roanoke		–		3	–	5	–	0
Sewanee		–		2	–	5	–	0
Delaware State		–		1	–	4	–	0
Georgia Teachers		–		2	–	8	–	0
Rankings from AP Poll

The 1941 Sewanee Tigers football team was an American football team that represented Sewanee: The University of the South during the 1941 college football season. This was Sewanee's first season being an independent after leaving the Southeastern Conference (SEC). In their second season under head coach Jenks Gillem, the Tigers compiled a 2–5 record.

== Schedule ==
Date	Opponent	Site	Result	Attendance	Source
September 26	at Washington & Lee	Wilson Field; Lexington, VA	W 20–19	3,000	
October 11	Davidson	Hardee Field; Sewanee, TN	W 7–0		
October 18	at Southwestern (TN)	Crump Stadium; Memphis, TN (rivalry)	L 0–35		
October 25	Tennessee Tech	Hardee Field; Sewanee, TN	L 0–12		
November 8	at Vanderbilt	Dudley Field; Nashville, TN (rivalry)	L 0–20	5,000	
November 15	at Chattanooga	Chamberlain Field; Chattanooga, TN	L 0–27		
November 29	at The Citadel	Johnson Hagood Stadium; Charleston, SC	L 0–28		
