= 1941 Georgia Teachers Blue Tide football team =

American college football season

1941 Georgia Teachers Blue Tide football
- Conference: Independent
- Record: 2–8
- Head coach: Crook Smith (13th season)

1941 Southern college football independents records
| | Conf. | | | Overall |
| Team | W | L | T | W | | L | | T |
|---|---|---|---|---|---|---|---|---|
| East Carolina | | – | | 7 | – | 0 | – | 0 |
| Delaware | | – | | 7 | – | 0 | – | 1 |
| Virginia | | – | | 8 | – | 1 | – | 0 |
| Marshall | | – | | 7 | – | 1 | – | 0 |
| No. 10 Navy | | – | | 7 | – | 1 | – | 1 |
| Georgetown | | – | | 5 | – | 4 | – | 0 |
| Western Maryland | | – | | 3 | – | 4 | – | 1 |
| West Virginia | | – | | 4 | – | 6 | – | 0 |
| Roanoke | | – | | 3 | – | 5 | – | 0 |
| Sewanee | | – | | 2 | – | 5 | – | 0 |
| Delaware State | | – | | 1 | – | 4 | – | 0 |
| Georgia Teachers | | – | | 2 | – | 8 | – | 0 |
Rankings from AP Poll

The 1941 Georgia Teachers Blue Tide football team, also known as the Professors, represented the Georgia Teachers College—now known as Georgia Southern University—as an independent during the 1941 college football season. Led by Crook Smith in his 13th and final year as head coach, the Blue Tide compiled a record of 2–8. Due to the outbreak of World War II, the football program was suspended after this season and was not revived until the 1982 season.

== Schedule ==
| Date | Time | Opponent | Site | Result | Attendance | Source |
|---|---|---|---|---|---|---|
| September 20 | | at Western Carolina | Cullowhee, NC | L 7–14 | | |
| September 27 | | at Mississippi Southern | Faulkner Field; Hattiesburg, MS | L 0–70 | | |
| October 3 | | at South Georgia | Douglas, GA | L 0–7 | | |
| October 11 | 8:15 p.m. | at Mercer | Porter Field; Macon, GA | L 0–25 | 1,000 | |
| October 17 | | at Troy State | Pace Field; Troy, AL | L 0–25 | | |
| October 24 | | Erskine | Statesboro, GA | L 0–7 | | |
| October 31 | | at Middle Georgia | Cochran, GA | W 14–6 | | |
| November 7 | | Oglethorpe | Statesboro, GA | L 0–53 | | |
| November 14 | | Camp Croft | Spartanburg, SC | L 0–30 | 14,000 | |
| November 21 | | South Georgia | Statesboro, GA | W 13–6 | | |
All times are in Eastern time
