= 1941 Virginia Cavaliers football team =

American college football season

1941 Virginia Cavaliers football
- Conference: Independent
- Record: 8–1
- Head coach: Frank Murray (5th season)
- Captain: Bill Dudley
- Home stadium: Scott Stadium

1941 Southern college football independents records
	Conf.			Overall
Team	W	L	T	W		L		T
East Carolina		–		7	–	0	–	0
Delaware		–		7	–	0	–	1
Virginia		–		8	–	1	–	0
Marshall		–		7	–	1	–	0
No. 10 Navy		–		7	–	1	–	1
Georgetown		–		5	–	4	–	0
Western Maryland		–		3	–	4	–	1
West Virginia		–		4	–	6	–	0
Roanoke		–		3	–	5	–	0
Sewanee		–		2	–	5	–	0
Delaware State		–		1	–	4	–	0
Georgia Teachers		–		2	–	8	–	0
Rankings from AP Poll

The 1941 Virginia Cavaliers football team was an American football team represented the University of Virginia as an independent during the 1941 college football season. In their fifth year under head coach Frank Murray, the Cavaliers compiled an 8–1 record and outscored opponents by a total of 279 to 42.

Halfback Bill Dudley was the team captain. Dudley became the school's second ever consensus first-team All-American, being selected by five of nine selectors, including the Associated Press. Dudley led the country in touchdowns, points scored, rushing average, and touchdowns responsible for. He became the school's first and only recipient of the Maxwell Award, distinguishing him as the best player in college football in 1941. He finished fifth in voting for the Heisman Trophy.

Virginia was ranked at No. 35 (out of 681 teams) in the final rankings under the Litkenhous Difference by Score System for 1941.

The team played its home games at Scott Stadium in Charlottesville, Virginia.

== Schedule ==
Date	Opponent	Site	Result	Attendance	Source
September 20	Hampden–Sydney	Scott Stadium; Charlottesville, VA	W 41–0	6,000	
September 27	Lafayette	Scott Stadium; Charlottesville, VA	W 25–0	9,000	
October 4	at Yale	Yale Bowl; New Haven, CT	L 19–21	25,000	
October 11	Richmond	Scott Stadium; Charlottesville, VA	W 44–0	10,000	
October 18	at VMI	Wilson Field; Lexington, VA	W 27–7	14,000	
November 1	vs. VPI	Foreman Field; Norfolk, VA (rivalry)	W 34–0	15,000	
November 8	Washington and Lee^{†}	Scott Stadium; Charlottesville, VA	W 27–7		
November 15	Lehigh	Scott Stadium; Charlottesville, VA	W 34–0	10,000	
November 20	at North Carolina	Kenan Memorial Stadium; Chapel Hill, NC (South's Oldest Rivalry)	W 28–7	22,000	
^{†}Homecoming
