= Bill Sewell (American football) =

American football player and coach (1916–1989)

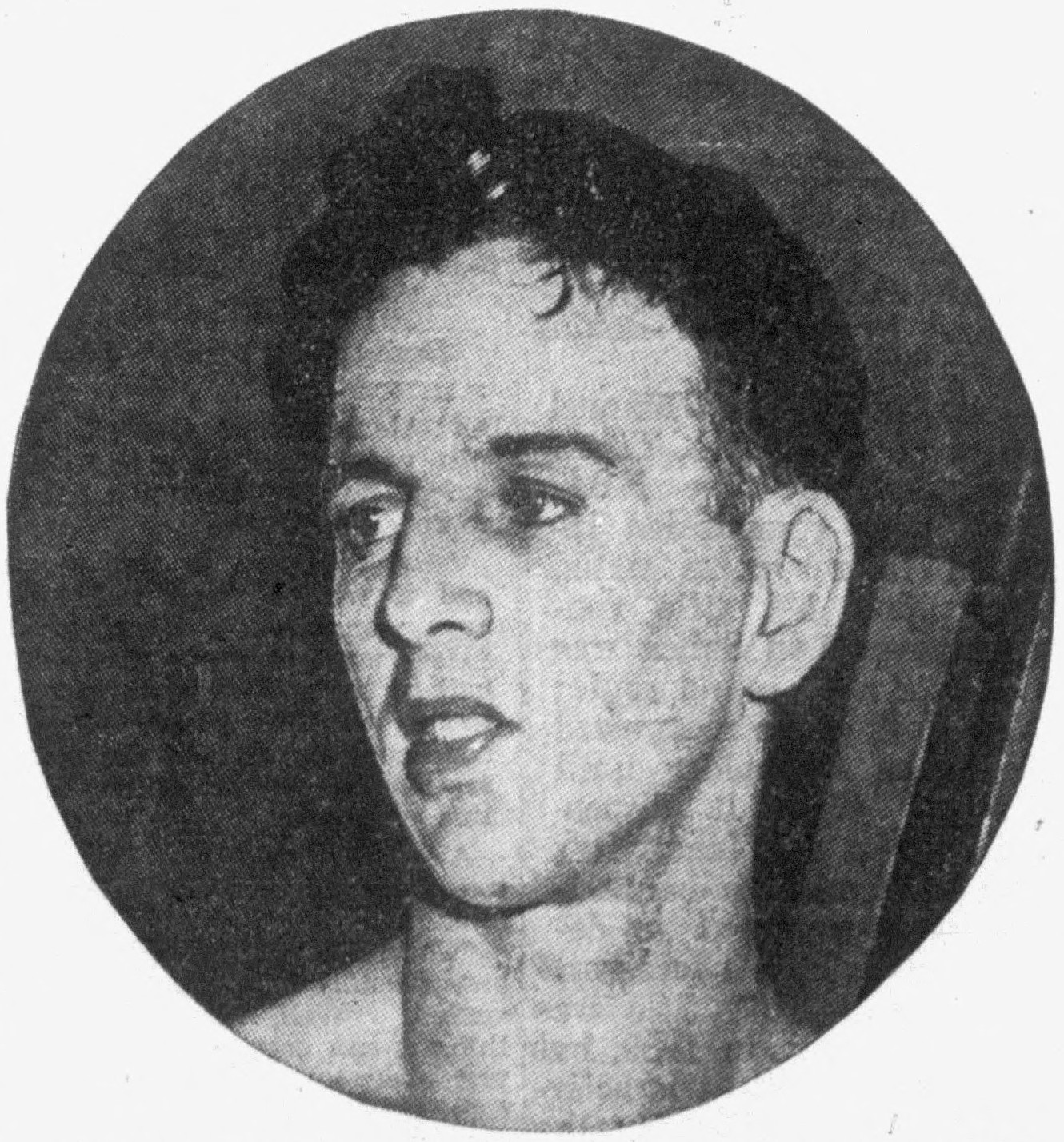
- Sewell, circa 1942

Profile
- Position: Quarterback

Personal information
- Born: April 11, 1916; Egremont, England
- Died: February 7, 1989 (aged 72)

Career information
- High school: Tacoma (WA) Lincoln
- College: Washington State

Awards and highlights
- Third-team All-American (1941); 2× First-team All-PCC (1940, 1941)

William Johnson Sewell (April 11, 1916 – February 7, 1989) was an American football player and coach.

Sewell was born in England and moved with his family to Tacoma, Washington, in 1925. He played college football for the Washington State Cougars football team. During the 1940 season, he led the country in passing with 86 complete passes for 1,023 yards. He also set a Washington State career record with 2,522 yards of total offense from 1939 to 1941. He was selected by both the Associated Press and the Newspaper Enterprise Association as the third-team quarterback on the 1941 College Football All-America Team. Sewell was also a pitcher for the Washington State baseball team.

Sewell became Washington State's baseball coach in 1947 and an assistant football coach in 1948. In 1949, he became the athletic director and athletic coach at Wenatchee Valley College, From 1956 to 1976, he was the athletic director and coach at Coast Union High School in Cambria, California. He was inducted into the Washington State Athletics Hall of Fame in 1987.
