= 1941 Lafayette Leopards football team =

American college football season

1941 Lafayette Leopards football

Middle Three champion
- Conference: Middle Three Conference
- Record: 5–4 (2–0 Middle Three)
- Head coach: Edward Mylin (5th season)
- Captains: Joseph Laird; John McKenna
- Home stadium: Fisher Field

1941 Middle Three Conference football standings
| | Conf. | | | | | Overall |
| Team | W | | L | | T | W | | L | | T |
|---|---|---|---|---|---|---|---|---|---|---|
| Lafayette $ | 2 | – | 0 | – | 0 | 5 | – | 4 | – | 0 |
| Rutgers | 1 | – | 1 | – | 0 | 7 | – | 2 | – | 0 |
| Lehigh | 0 | – | 2 | – | 0 | 0 | – | 6 | – | 3 |
$ – Conference champion

The 1941 Lafayette Leopards football team was an American football team represented the Lafayette College as a member of the Middle Three Conference during the 1941 college football season. In its fifth season under head coach Edward Mylin, the team compiled a 5–4 record and won the Middle Three championship. Joseph Laird and John McKenna were the team captains. The team played home games at Fisher Field in Easton, Pennsylvania.

Lafayette was ranked at No. 95 (out of 681 teams) in the final rankings under the Litkenhous Difference by Score System for 1941.

== Schedule ==
| Date | Opponent | Site | Result | Attendance | Source |
|---|---|---|---|---|---|
| September 27 | at Virginia* | Scott Stadium; Charlottesville, VA | L 0–25 | 9,000 | |
| October 4 | NYU* | Fisher Field; Easton, PA | L 0–6 | 7,500 | |
| October 11 | at Navy* | Thompson Stadium; Annapolis, MD | L 2–41 | 21,000 | |
| October 18 | Muhlenberg* | Fisher Field; Easton, PA | W 40–0 | | |
| October 25 | Brown* | Fisher Field; Easton, PA | L 0–13 | 8,000 | |
| November 1 | at Gettysburg* | Gettysburg, PA | W 17–6 | | |
| November 8 | Rutgers | Fisher Field; Easton, PA | W 16–0 | 10,000 | |
| November 15 | Western Maryland* | Fisher Field; Easton, PA | W 26–0 | 5,000 | |
| November 22 | at Lehigh | Bethlehem, PA (rivalry) | W 47–7 | 10,000 | |
*Non-conference game
