= 1941 Marshall Thundering Herd football team =

American college football season

1941 Marshall Thundering Herd football
- Conference: Independent
- Record: 7–1
- Head coach: Cam Henderson (7th season)
- Captains: Jim Pearcy; Ed Ulinski
- Home stadium: Fairfield Stadium

1941 Southern college football independents records
	Conf.			Overall
Team	W	L	T	W		L		T
East Carolina		–		7	–	0	–	0
Delaware		–		7	–	0	–	1
Virginia		–		8	–	1	–	0
Marshall		–		7	–	1	–	0
No. 10 Navy		–		7	–	1	–	1
Georgetown		–		5	–	4	–	0
Western Maryland		–		3	–	4	–	1
West Virginia		–		4	–	6	–	0
Roanoke		–		3	–	5	–	0
Sewanee		–		2	–	5	–	0
Delaware State		–		1	–	4	–	0
Georgia Teachers		–		2	–	8	–	0
Rankings from AP Poll

The 1941 Marshall Thundering Herd football team was an American football team that represented Marshall University as an independent during the 1941 college football season. In its seventh season under head coach Cam Henderson, the team compiled a 7–1 record and outscored opponents by a total of 217 to 47. Jim Pearcy and Ed Ulinski were the team captains.

Marshall was ranked at No. 53 (out of 681 teams) in the final rankings under the Litkenhous Difference by Score System for 1941.

== Schedule ==
Date	Opponent	Site	Result	Source
September 20	Omaha	Fairfield Stadium; Huntington, WV	W 62–6	
September 27	Illinois Wesleyan	Fairfield Stadium; Huntington, WV	W 51–7	
October 4	at Dayton	Dayton Stadium; Dayton, OH	L 0–7	
October 11	Toledo	Fairfield Stadium; Huntington, WV	W 13–7	
October 18	Western Kentucky State Teachers	Fairfield Stadium; Huntington, WV	W 34–7	
October 25	at Scranton	Scranton, PA	W 13–0	
November 1	Wake Forest	Fairfield Stadium; Huntington, WV	W 28–7	
November 8	Morehead State	Fairfield Stadium; Huntington, WV	W 28–7	
