= Tom Kearns (American football) =

American football player and politician (1919–2007)

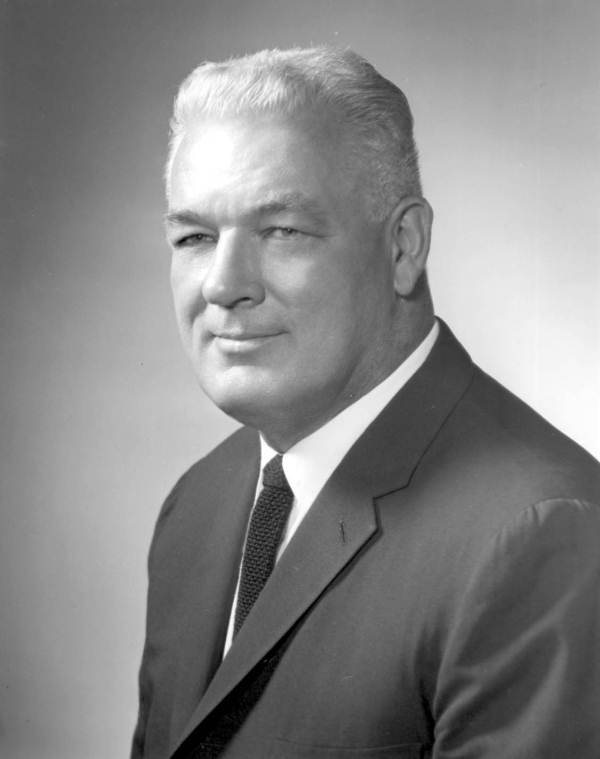

Member of the Florida House of Representatives from the Broward County district
- In office 1965–1966

Personal details
- Born: November 26, 1919
- Died: February 17, 2007 (aged 87)
- Party: Democratic
- Education: University of Miami
- Profession: Businessman, professional athlete
- Football career

Profile
- Position: Tackle

Personal information
- Listed height: 6 ft 4 in (1.93 m)
- Listed weight: 247 lb (112 kg)

Career information
- High school: Somerville (MA)
- College: Miami
- NFL draft: 1942: 8th round, 68th overall pick

Career history
- New York Giants (1945); Chicago Cardinals (1946)
- Stats at Pro Football Reference

Thomas Norman Kearns (November 26, 1919 – February 17, 2007) was an American politician and professional American football player. He played two seasons in the National Football League after playing college football at the University of Miami. Kearns later served one term as a member of the Florida House of Representatives as a Democrat representing Broward County.

== Early life ==
Kearns was born on November 26, 1919, in Medford, Massachusetts, and grew up in Somerville, Massachusetts, where he attended Somerville High School.

== Collegiate career ==
Kearns played college football for the Miami Hurricanes. He was named to the All-Florida team as a tackle in 1940 and first team Little All-American by the Associated Press in 1941 as a senior while serving as the team's captain, making him the first Hurricanes player to be named a first team All-American. Kearns was also a member of Miami's boxing team and competed in the 1940 NCAA Boxing Championship and was a starter on the men's basketball team. Kearns was inducted into Miami's athletic hall of fame in 1970 and was a member of the Iron Arrow Honor Society, the highest honor bestowed by the university.

== Professional football ==
Kearns was selected in the eighth round of the 1942 NFL draft by the New York Giants. He joined the team in 1945 after serving in the US Navy during World War II, replacing Len Younce who had recently been inducted into the military. He was originally signed by the Miami Seahawks of the All-America Football Conference for the 1946 season, but only participated in the team's training camp. Kearns was signed by the Chicago Cardinals and spent the 1946 season with the team.

== Post-football and political career ==
After his football career ended, Kearns ran several businesses, including being the director of Barnett Bank. He also served as the chair of several community organizations, including the Florida Chamber of Commerce and United Way of Broward County. He was elected to the Florida House of Representatives and served one term from 1965 to 1966. He was appointed to the Board of the Port Everglades Authority in 1981 by Governor Bob Graham.

Kearns also served on the University of Miami board of trustees. The University of Miami's Athletic Hall of Fame building is named in his honor.

== Death ==
Kearns died on February 17, 2007, at age 87.
