= 1941 All-Eastern football team =

1941 American Football Players

The 1941 All-Eastern football team consists of American football players chosen by various organizations for All-Eastern teams at the conclusion of the 1941 college football season. The organizations selecting teams in 1941 included the Associated Press (AP).

The 1941 Fordham Rams football team, ranked No. 6 in the final AP Poll, placed three players on the AP first and second teams: back Steve Filipowicz (AP-1); end Jim Lansing (AP-2); and guard Larry Sartori (AP-2).

The 1941 Navy Midshipmen football team, ranked No. 10 in the final AP Poll, also placed three players: back Bill Busik (AP-1) and tackles Bill Chewning (AP-1) and Gene Flathmann (AP-2).

The 1941 Duquesne Dukes football team, ranked No. 8 in the final AP Poll, placed two players: end John Rokisky (AP-1) and center Al DeMao (AP-2).

== All-Eastern selections ==
=== Backs ===
- Gene Davis, Penn (AP-1)
- Andy Tomasic, Temple (AP-1)
- Bill Busik, Navy (AP-1)
- Steve Filipowicz, Fordham (AP-1)
- Edgar Jones, Pittsburgh (AP-2)
- Paul Governali, Columbia (AP-2)
- Henry Mazur, Army (AP-2)
- Len Krouse, Penn State (AP-2)

=== Ends ===
- John Rokisky, Duquesne (AP-1)
- Loren MacKinney, Harvard (AP-1)
- Jim Lansing, Fordham (AP-2)
- Bernie Kuczynski, Penn (AP-2)

=== Tackles ===
- Bill Chewning, Navy (AP-1)
- Al Blozis, Georgetown (AP-1)
- Gene Flathmann, Navy (AP-2)
- Hank Zajkowski, Temple (AP-2)

=== Guards ===
- Endicott Peabody, Harvard (AP-1)
- Ralph Fife, Pittsburgh (AP-1)
- Dick Weber, Syracuse (AP-2)
- Larry Sartori, Fordham (AP-2)

=== Centers ===
- Ed Korisky, Villanova (AP-1)
- Al DeMao, Duquesne (AP-2)

== Key ==
AP = Associated Press

== See also ==
- 1941 College Football All-America Team
