= 1941 Pittsburgh Panthers football team =

American college football season

1941 Pittsburgh Panthers football
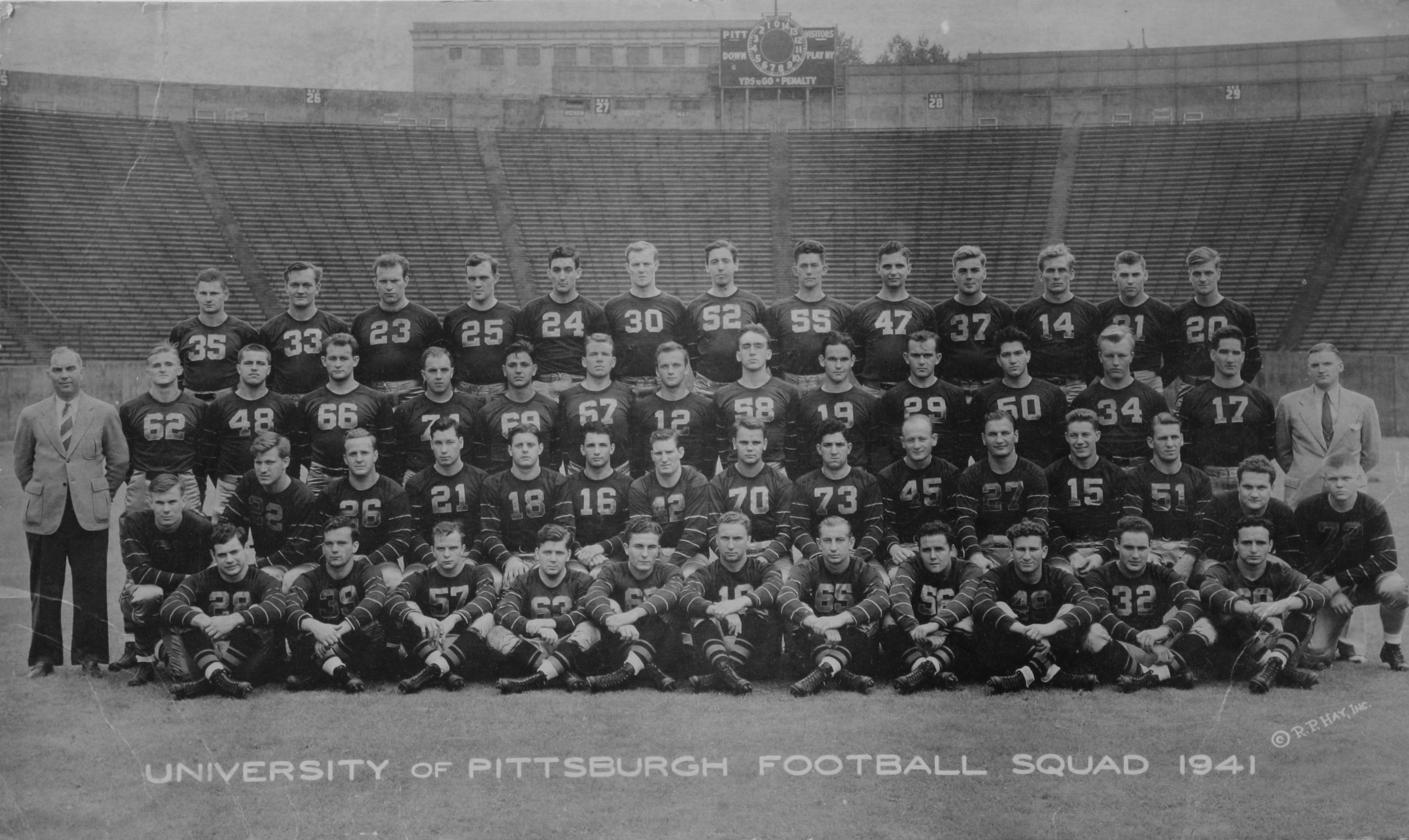
- Conference: Independent
- Record: 3–6
- Head coach: Charley Bowser (3rd season)
- Home stadium: Pitt Stadium

1941 Eastern college football independents records
	Conf.			Overall
Team	W	L	T	W		L		T
No. 8 Duquesne		–		8	–	0	–	0
Thiel		–		7	–	0	–	0
Saint Francis (PA)		–		6	–	0	–	1
No. 6 Fordham		–		8	–	1	–	0
Rochester		–		6	–	1	–	0
Trinity (CT)		–		6	–	1	–	0
Wagner		–		5	–	1	–	0
Franklin & Marshall		–		5	–	1	–	1
Penn State		–		7	–	2	–	0
Temple		–		7	–	2	–	0
Coast Guard		–		6	–	2	–	0
Norwich		–		6	–	2	–	0
Hofstra		–		5	–	2	–	0
Boston College		–		7	–	3	–	0
Syracuse		–		5	–	2	–	1
Bucknell		–		6	–	3	–	0
Drexel		–		4	–	2	–	1
Boston University		–		5	–	3	–	0
La Salle		–		5	–	3	–	0
Tufts		–		5	–	3	–	0
Army		–		5	–	3	–	1
CCNY		–		4	–	4	–	0
Villanova		–		4	–	4	–	0
Manhattan		–		4	–	4	–	1
Holy Cross		–		4	–	4	–	2
Colgate		–		3	–	3	–	2
Providence		–		3	–	3	–	2
Buffalo		–		3	–	4	–	1
Massachusetts State		–		3	–	4	–	1
Pittsburgh		–		3	–	6	–	0
Vermont		–		2	–	6	–	0
NYU		–		2	–	7	–	0
Carnegie Tech		–		1	–	7	–	0
Rankings from AP Poll

The 1941 Pittsburgh Panthers football team was an American football team that represented the University of Pittsburgh as an independent during the 1941 college football season. In their third year under head coach Charley Bowser, the Panthers compiled a 3–6 record and were outscored by a total of 171 to 82.

Guard Ralph Fife was selected as a first-team All-American by the Associated Press (AP). Fife was also selected by the AP as a first-team player on the 1941 All-Eastern football team. Halfback Edgar Jones was named to the second team on the All-Eastern team.

Pittsburgh was ranked at No. 74 (out of 681 teams) in the final rankings under the Litkenhous Difference by Score System for 1941.

== Schedule ==
Date	Opponent	Site	Result	Attendance	Source
October 4	Purdue	Pitt Stadium; Pittsburgh, PA	L 0–6	24,000	
October 11	at Michigan	Michigan Stadium; Ann Arbor, MI	L 0–40	34,403	
October 18	at No. 1 Minnesota	Memorial Stadium; Minneapolis, MN	L 0–39	35,000	
October 25	No. 4 Duke	Pitt Stadium; Pittsburgh, PA	L 7–27	25,000–28,000	
November 1	Ohio State	Pitt Stadium; Pittsburgh, PA	L 14–21	50,000	
November 8	No. 3 Fordham	Pitt Stadium; Pittsburgh, PA	W 13–0	20,000–25,000	
November 15	at Nebraska	Memorial Stadium; Lincoln, NE	W 14–7	35,000	
November 22	Penn State	Pitt Stadium; Pittsburgh, PA (rivalry)	L 7–31	33,000	
November 29	Carnegie Tech	Pitt Stadium; Pittsburgh, PA	W 27–0	19,000	
Rankings from AP Poll released prior to the game

== Preseason ==
On March 1, Charles Hartwig, former Pitt All-American lineman, was added to coach Bowser's staff as guard coach. Former guard coach Luther Richards left the squad in September and Harold Klein stepped in temporarily while finishing his degree. Hartwig had been coaching at Martins Ferry High School in Ohio. Dick Fullerton resigned to go into business and Bill Daddio signed a contract to play football for the Chicago Cardinals. Ted Konetsky was hired to aid Kliskey with the freshmen.

In mid-February, Coach Bowser had the football players attend meetings with their position coach to study film and techniques. Bowser faced the hardest schedule in Pitt history with only four returning starters. Outdoor spring drills did not commence until late March due to inclement weather. Sixty-two candidates were given uniforms. On April 26, spring practice ended with a scrimmage starring halfback Jack Stetler. The White team scored first when halfback Stetler threw a 15-yard touchdown pass to Bill Fitchko. Stetler changed jerseys at halftime, and scored for the Blue squad on a 2-yard run to make the final score 6–6.

On September 10, third-year Coach Bowser's 55-member squad began preseason practice. The Panthers wore plastic helmets that were similar to the headgear worn by the RAF paratroopers.

== Coaching staff ==
1941 Pittsburgh Panthers football staff
Coaching staff: Charley Bowser – Head coach; Robert Hoel – Assistant coach; Dr. Arnold Greene – fullback coach; Harold Stebbins – halfback coach; Charles Hartwig – guard coach; John Dickinson – end coach; Nick Kliskey– freshman team coach; Ted Konetsky – assistant freshman team coach	Support staff: Dr. H. A. Ralph Shanor – team physician; Howard Waite – football trainer; Harold Whitson – varsity equipment manager; James Hagan - director of athletics; Frank Carver – publicity director; William Ritenbaugh – varsity student manager

== Roster ==
1941 Pittsburgh Panthers football roster
Player	Position	Games	Height	Weight	Class	Prep School	Hometown
Joseph Adamchic	halfback	1	5 ft 10 in	175	1943	Union City H. S.	Union City, PA
George Allshouse*	center	8	5 ft 10 in	188	1942	Duquesne H. S.	Duquesne, PA
Vincent Antonelli*	guard	8	5 ft 10 in	183	1943	Schenley H. S.	Pittsburgh, PA
William Benghouser*	tackle	9	6 ft	200	1942	DuBois H. S.	DuBois, PA
Joseph Brody	end	0	5 ft 11 in	175	1943	Latrobe H. S.	Latrobe, PA
Joseph Broudy	guard	3	5 ft 11 in	185	1944	Peabody H. S.	Pittsburgh, PA
James Clowes	center	2	6 ft 1 in	195	1944	Har-Brack H. S.	Tarentum, PA
Joseph Connell*	fullback	9	5 ft 11 in	192	1942	Charleroi H. S.	Charleroi, PA
Robert Costello	tackle	0	6 ft 1 in	195	1944	Schenley H. S.	Pittsburgh, PA
Robert Crissman*	tackle	2	6 ft 1 in	194	1942	Butler H. S.	Butler, PA
William Dillon*	guard	7	6 ft	185	1944	Trinity H. S.	Marianna, PA
Jack Durishan*	tackle	9	6 ft	220	1944	Hazleton H. S.	Hazleton, PA
William Dutton*	halfback	9	5 ft 10 in	170	1943	Weston H. S.	Weston, WV
Tom Economos	quarterback	0	5 ft 11 in	180	1944	Schenley H. S.	Pittsburgh, PA
Dwight Emerick	quarterback	0	6 ft	177	1943	Aspinwall H. S.	Aspinwall, PA
Ralph Fife*	guard	9	5 ft 11 in	185	1942	Canton McKinley H. S.	Canton, OH
William Fitchko	end	0	6 ft	180	1942	Gary H. S.	Filbert, WV
John Gates	guard	0	5 ft 10 in	200	1942		Pittsburgh, PA
Mat Gebel	halfback	5	6 ft 1 in	185	1944	East Pittsburgh H. S.	East Pittsburgh, PA
Stanley Gervelis*	end	9	6 ft 1 in	190	1942	Charleroi H. S.	Charleroi, PA
Norbert Gestner	end	3	6 ft 2 in	165	1944	Tarentum H. S.	Tarentum, PA
Ralph Hammond*	quarterback	7	5 ft 11 in	180	1943	Fulton H. S.	Wilkinsburg, PA
Jack Heister	center	2	6 ft 2 in	185	1943	Aspinwall H. S.	Aspinwall, PA
Harold Hinte	end	5	5 ft 11in	185	1943	Mt. Hope H. S.	Sun, WV
Edgar Jones*	halfback	9	5ft 10 in	175	1942	Scranton Technical H. S.	Scranton, PA
Jack Kerr	halfback	2	6 ft	186	1944	Schenley H. S.	Pittsburgh, PA
Harry Kindelberger*	tackle	9	6 ft 3 in	200	1942	Warwood H. S.	Oil City, PA
Harry Kozic*	end	0	6 ft	175	1944	Duquesne H. S.	Duquesne, PA
Albert Kunkel*	center	2	6 ft 1 in	190	1942	Langley H. S.	Pittsburgh, PA
William Lohmeyer	end	0	6 ft 4 in	198	1943	Central Catholic H. S.	Pittsburgh, PA
James Mariades	guard	0	5 ft 9 in	180	1944	Groveton H. S.	Groveton, PA
George Mitchell*	guard	8	6 ft	190	1942	Ellsworth H. S.	Ellsworth, PA
Stephen Mlanarich	guard	0	5 ft 8 in	180	1944	East Pittsburgh H. S.	East Pittsburgh, PA
Leo Mueller	tackle	0	5 ft 10 in	200	1944	Perry H. S.	Pittsburgh, PA
Joe Pierre	end	0	6 ft	175	1944	Windber H. S.	Windber, PA
Raymond Rabinek*	quarterback	1	5 ft 10 in	180	1942	South H. S.	Pittsburgh, PA
Alex Ramsey	tackle	0	6 ft	205	1944		Pittsburgh, PA
Bruce Reuter	halfback	1	5 ft 10 in	165	1944	Aspinwall H. S.	Aspinwall, PA
Martin Rosepink*	end	6	5 ft 11 in	190	1944	Verona H. S.	Verona, PA
John Ross*	fullback	5	5 ft 10 in	184	1942	Ellsworth H. S.	Ellsworth, PA
Frank Saksa*	halfback	8	5 ft 11 in	180	1943	Braddock H. S.	Braddock, PA
Joe Salvucci*	tackle	6	6 ft	210	1944	Peabody H. S.	Pittsburgh, PA
Frank Scatton	quarterback	2	5 ft 11 in	175	1944	Hazleton H. S.	Hazleton, PA
John Shaffer	tackle	1	5 ft 10 in	180	1944		Pittsburgh, PA
Mitchell Sinclair	end	0	5 ft 11 in	165	1944	Canonsburg H. S.	Canonsburg, PA
Steve Sinclair	center	7	6 ft 1 in	210	1942	Canonsburg H. S.	Canonsburg, PA
Joe Skladaney	halfback	0	6 ft	185	1944	Larksville H. S.	Larksville, PA
Michael Sotak	end	5	5 ft 9 in	180	1944	Hazleton H. S.	Hazleton, PA
John Stahl*	end	9	5 ft 10 in	185	1942	Tarentum H. S.	Tarentum, PA
Jack Stetler*	halfback	8	5 ft 10 in	168	1941	Glenshaw H. S.	Glenshaw, PA
Harold Stickel*	halfback	3	5 ft 10 in	168	1944	McKees Rocks H. S.	McKees Rocks, PA
Richard Stitt	guard	0	5 ft 11 in	180	1944	Tarentum H. S.	Tarentum, PA
Robert Stodgell	guard	0	5 ft 11 in	185	1942	Peru H. S.	Peru, IN
Walter Ward	tackle	0	5 ft 10 in	180	1943	Bellevue H. S.	Pittsburgh, PA
Walter West*	quarterback	9	6 ft	185	1943	Burgettstown H. S.	Atlasburg, PA
William Rittenbaugh*	varsity football manager				1942	Peabody H. S.	Pittsburgh, PA
* Letterman

== Game summaries ==
=== Purdue ===
Week 1: Purdue at Pitt

Team	1	2	3	4	Total
• Purdue	0	6	0	0	6
Pitt	0	0	0	0	0

- Date: October 4, 1941
- Location: Pitt Stadium
  Pittsburgh, PA
- Game start: 2:00 p.m.
- Game attendance: 24,000
- Game weather: hot
- Referee: H. O. Dayhoff (Bucknell)

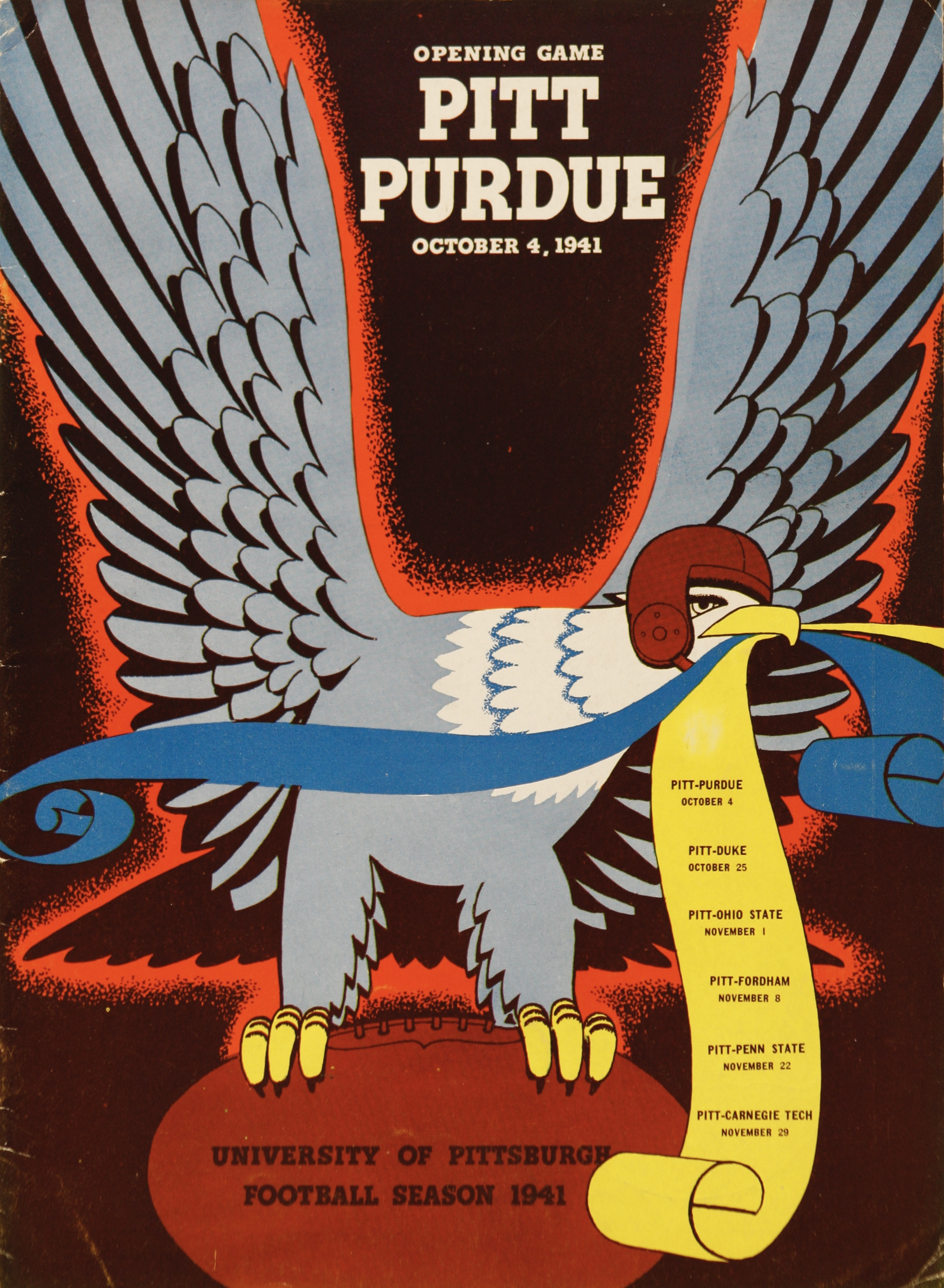
Program for October 4 game versus Purdue

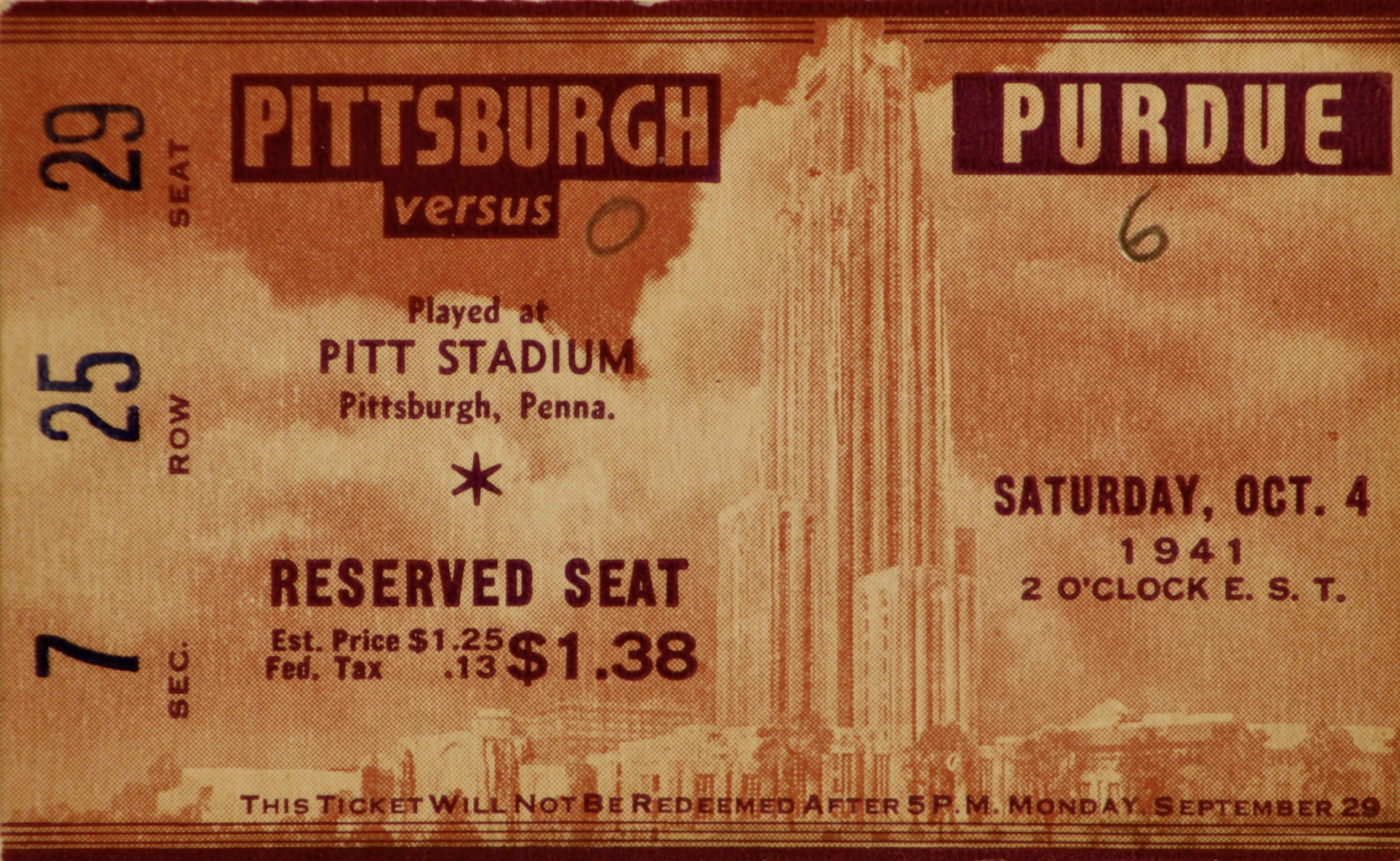
Ticket stub for October 4 game versus Purdue

On October 4, the Panthers opened the season against Mal Elward's Purdue Boilermakers, the supposed weakest of their 4 Western Conference opponents. Purdue had 21 returning lettermen, but they were upset 3 to 0 by Vanderbilt in their opener. Their guard Tom Melton was named third team All-America by the Associated Press.

Coach Bowser warned: "Don't be fooled by that defeat by Vanderbilt. Purdue is a tough ball club, both offensively and defensively...Any squad that has 21 lettermen, plus a lot of good sophomores, is bound to be good...Our chief lack is experience, and we'll pick that up as we go along." The Panthers starting lineup had one holdover, end Stanley Gervelis, from the 1940 squad.

Frank Carver, Pitt Publicity Director, announced that children under 12 would be admitted the game for 25 cents and soldiers in uniform would be admitted for 50 cents.

The Panthers lost their first home opener since 1922 as the Boilermakers eked out a 6 to 0 win. Pitt received the opening kick-off and advanced the ball to the Purdue 9-yard line. Four running plays failed to move the ball beyond the 1-yard line, and Purdue took over on downs. Purdue scored in the second period. Pitt back Bill Dutton fumbled on his own 29-yard line and Tom Melton recovered for Purdue. John Petty ran through right guard from the 2-yard line for the touchdown. John Galvin missed the point after. The Pitt offense then advanced the ball to the Purdue 22-yard, from where they threw five incomplete passes (off-setting penalties gave the extra down) as time ran out in the first half. Purdue back Ken Smock ran the second half kick-off back 65 yards to the Panther 35-yard line for the highlight of the game. The Pitt defense kept Purdue from scoring, even though the second half was mostly played in Pitt territory. The Boilermakers finished the season with a 2–5–1 overall record and tied for seventh place in the Western Conference at 1–3.

The Pitt starting lineup for the game against Purdue was Stanley Gervelis (left end), Harry Kindelberger (left tackle), George Mitchell (left guard), Jack Heister (center), Vince Antonelli (right guard), William Benghouser (right tackle), Harold Hinte (right end), Walter West (quarterback), Jack Stetler (left halfback), William Dutton (right halfback) and John Ross (fullback). Substitutes appearing in the game for Pitt were Norbert Gestner, Jack Durishan, Joseph Broudy, Steve Sinclair, Ralph Fife, Joe Salvucci, John Stahl, Ralph Hammond, Edgar Jones, Joe Connell, Frank Saska, Jack Kerr and Mat Gebel.

Scoring summary

Quarter	Time	Drive			Team	Scoring information	Score	
Quarter	Time	Plays	Yards	TOP	Team	Scoring information	Purdue	Pittsburgh
2		5	29		Purdue	John Petty 2-yard touchdown run, John Galvin kick no good	6	0
"TOP" = time of possession. For other American football terms, see Glossary of American football.							6	0

=== At Michigan ===
Week 2: Pitt at Michigan

Team	1	2	3	4	Total
Pitt	0	0	0	0	0
• Michigan	6	0	14	20	40

- Date: October 11, 1941
- Location: Michigan Stadium
  Ann Arbor, MI
- Game start: 2:00 p.m.
- Game attendance: 34,403
- Game weather: clear
- Referee: Frank Lane (Cincinnati)

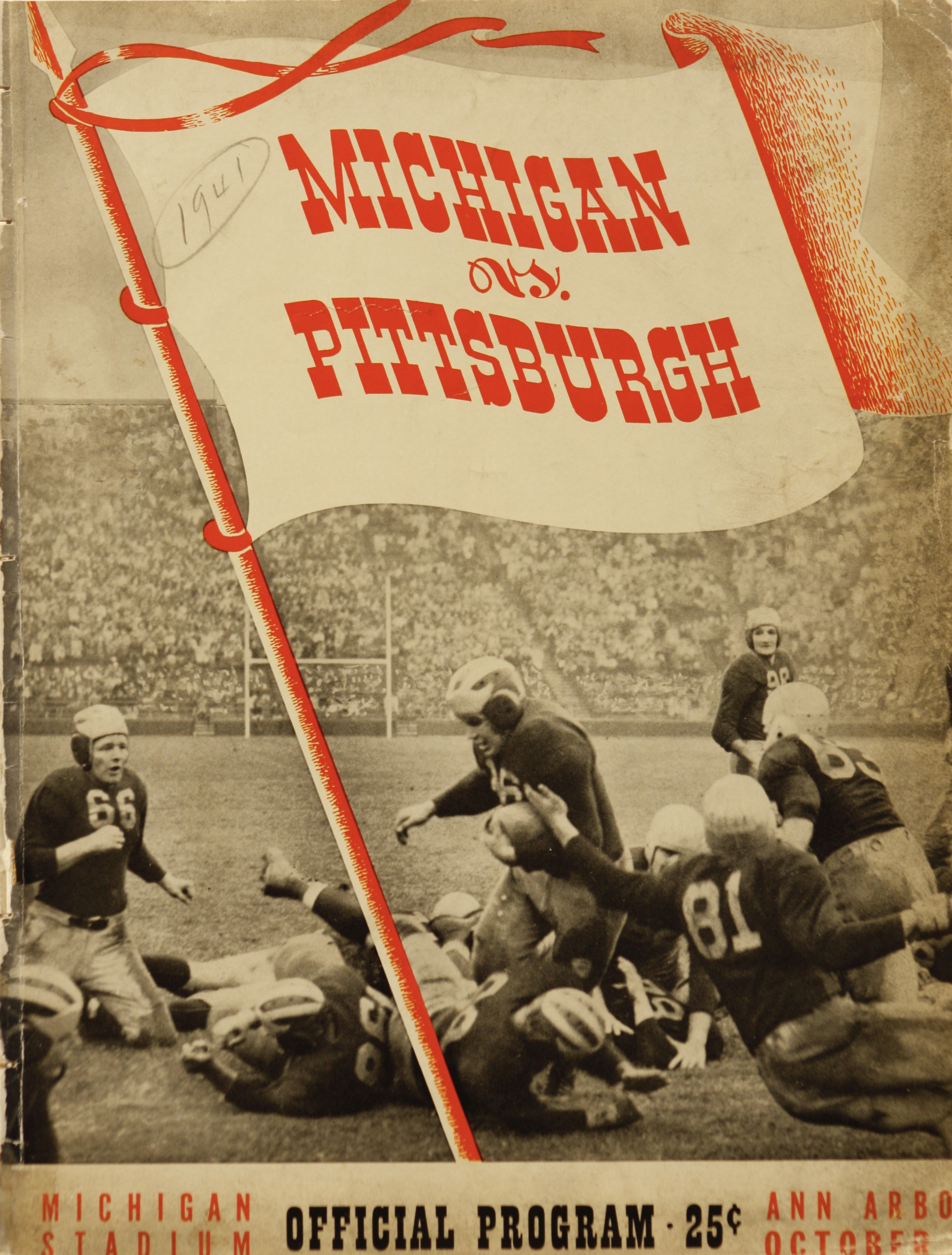
Program for October 11 game versus Michigan

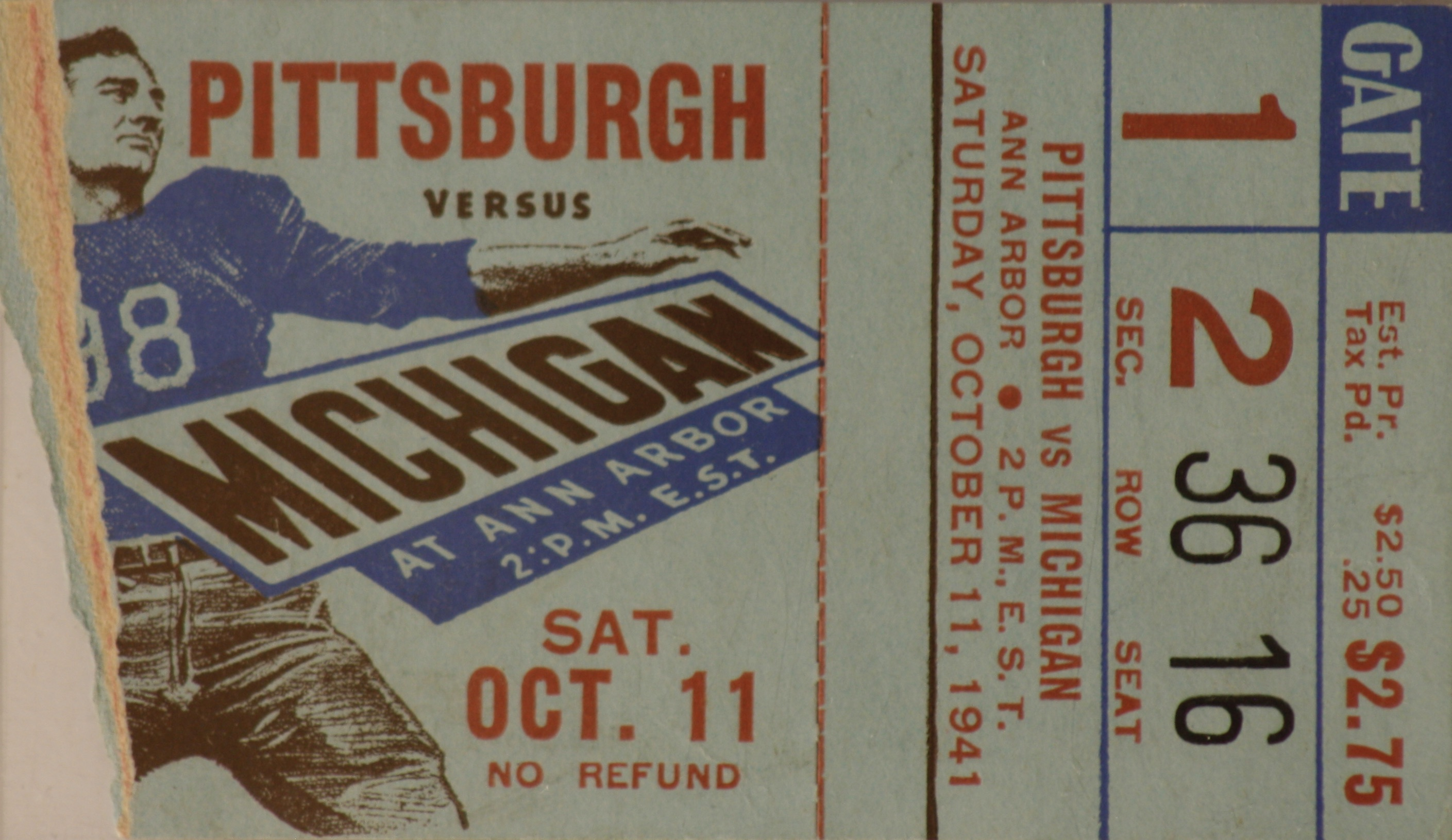
Ticket stub for October 11 game versus Michigan

On October 11, the Pitt Panthers traveled to Ann Arbor, MI for their first game against Fritz Crisler's Michigan Wolverines in “The Big House”. Michigan was 2–0 on the season, having beaten Michigan State 19–7 and Iowa 6–0. Fullback Bob Westfall and tackle Al Wistert received recognition on both the 1941 College Football All-America Team and the 1941 All-Big Ten Conference football team. Even though the Wolverines were 7-5 favorites, Crisler told the Detroit Free Press: "We are prepared for anything...We are taking nothing for granted."

While his 34-man traveling squad worked out on Michigan Stadium, Coach Bowser noted: "We're the underdogs and we should be. Michigan has a distinct edge in experience and that veteran Michigan line will be a tough nut to crack."

Coach Bowser was correct as the Wolverines routed the Panthers 40 to 0. The Pitt offense was limited to three first downs (27 yards rushing and 18 yards passing). They never penetrated beyond the Michigan 35-yard line. Michigan scored 6 touchdowns, had one called back on a clipping penalty, and ran out of time on the Pitt 1-yard line to end the game. The Panthers' defense gave up a 72-yard, 14 play drive in the opening period. Michigan back Harold Lockard scored on a 6-yard run. Merv Pregulman missed the point after. The rest of the first half was scoreless. Left halfback Tom Kuzma scored two touchdowns in the third quarter. His 7-yard scoring jaunt, after a recovered Pitt fumble, was followed by a 48-yard punt return. Bob Ingalls converted both placements. Three substitute backs – Don Boor, Don Robinson and Dave Nelson – scored in the final quarter. Bill Melzow converted two of the placements to reach 40 points. The Wolverines finished the season #5 in the final Associated Press poll with a record of 6–1–1.

The 40–0 defeat was the worst drubbing handed the Panthers since 1903 when the WUP athletic department was in disarray and both Penn State (59–0) and Geneva (57–0) ran up the score. Eddie Beachler of The Pittsburgh Press lamented: "Thus life begins at “40” for the Panthers – a new life of 40–0 defeats, marking the end of one of football's greatest dynasties that made Pitt's 'Sock It To-Em!' one of the most feared cries in the grid world."

The Pitt starting lineup for the game against Michigan was Stanley Gervelis (left end), Harry Kindelberger (left tackle), George Mitchell (left guard), Jack Heister (center), Ralph Fife (right guard), William Benghouser (right tackle), Harold Hinte (right end), Walter West (quarterback), Jack Stetler (left halfback), William Dutton (right halfback) and John Ross (fullback). Substitutes appearing in the game for Pitt were John Stahl, Norbert Gestner, Martin Rosepink, Jack Durishan, Joe Salvucci, Robert Crissman, Vince Antonelli, Joseph Broudy, William Dillon, Steve Sinclair, James Clowes, Ralph Hammond, George Allshouse, Frank Scatton, Edgar Jones, Joe Connell, Frank Saska, Jack Kerr and Mat Gebel.

Scoring summary

Quarter	Time	Drive			Team	Scoring information	Score	
Quarter	Time	Plays	Yards	TOP	Team	Scoring information	Pittsburgh	Michigan
1		14	72		Michigan	Harold Lockard 6-yard touchdown run, Merv Pregulman kick no good	0	6
3		2	29		Michigan	Tom Kuzma 7-yard touchdown run, Bob Ingalls kick good	0	13
3		1	48		Michigan	Punt returned 48 yards for touchdown by Tom Kuzma, Bob Ingalls kick good	0	20
4		6	22		Michigan	Don Boor 7-yard touchdown run, Bill Melzow kick good	0	27
4		2	6		Michigan	Don Robinson 5-yard touchdown run, Bill Melzow kick good	0	34
4		2	24		Michigan	Dave Nelson 27-yard touchdown run, Bill Melzow kick no good	0	40
"TOP" = time of possession. For other American football terms, see Glossary of American football.							0	40

=== At Minnesota ===
Week 3: Pitt at Minnesota

Team	1	2	3	4	Total
Pitt	0	0	0	0	0
• Minnesota	0	21	12	6	39

- Date: October 18, 1941
- Location: Memorial Stadium (University of Minnesota)
  Minneapolis, MN
- Game start: 2:00 p.m.
- Game attendance: 35,000
- Game weather: drizzle
- Referee: James Masker (Northwestern)

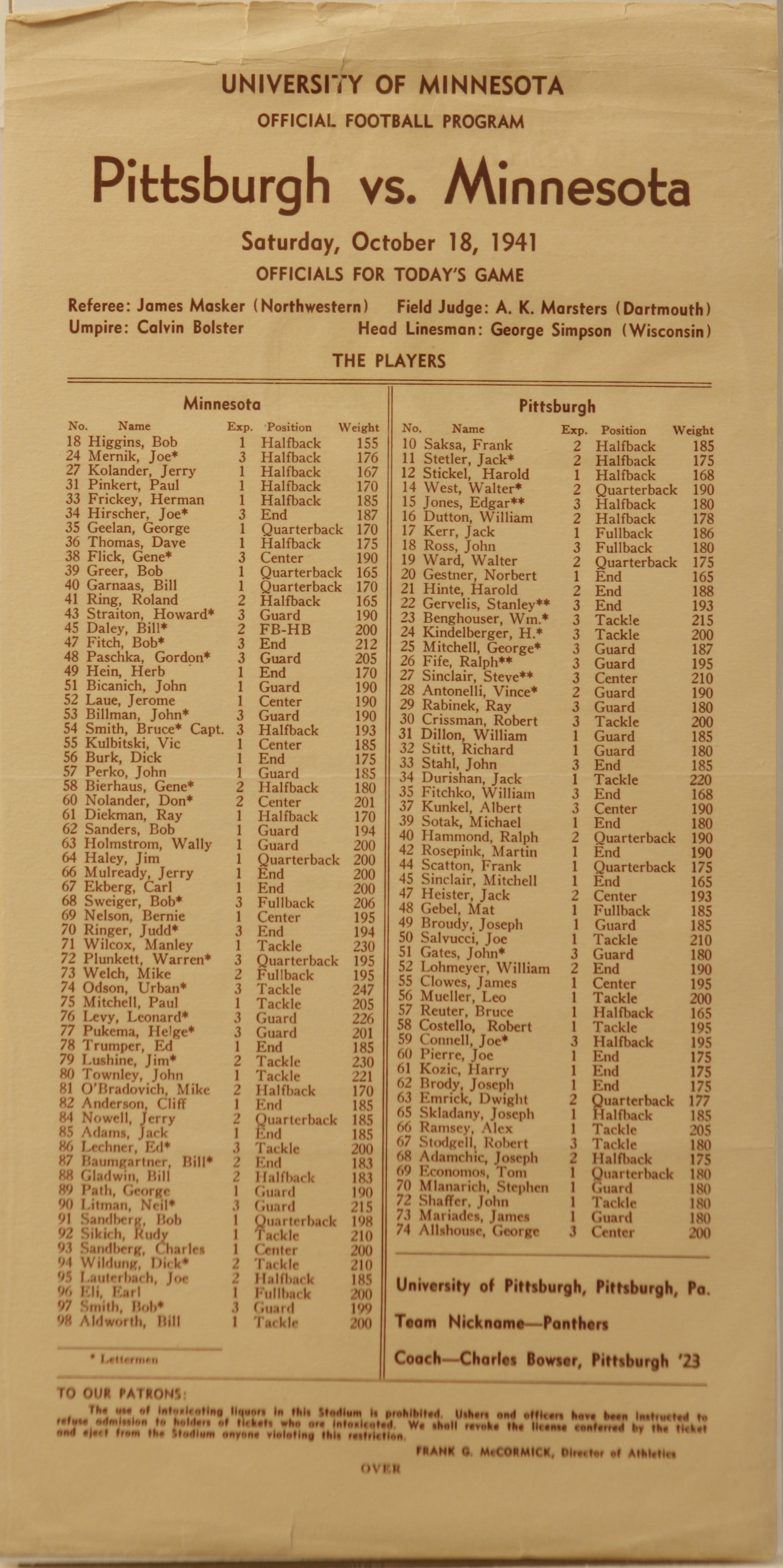
Roster Sheet for October 18 game versus Minnesota

On October 18, the Panthers traveled to Minneapolis, MN to play the defending National Champion Minnesota Gophers. 10-year coach Bernie Bierman's Gophers were on an eleven game win streak. They beat Washington and Illinois to open the season. All-America halfback and Heisman Trophy winner Bruce Smith led the backfield and All-America tackle Dick Wildung anchored the Gopher line.

Coach Bowser altered the lineup for the Gophers: George Allshouse replaced Jack Heister at center; Edgar Jones and Joe Connell replaced Jack Stetler and William Dutton at halfback and Mat Gebel replaced John Ross at fullback. The Gophers were favored by more than 25 points. Bowser told the Star Journal: "I'd say our morale is good under the circumstances and the changes we have made in the lineup this week have improved our team somewhat, but I'm not going to hazard any guess on what will happen until I see for myself."

The Minnesota Gophers continued their winning streak buy routing the Panthers 39 to 0. The Panthers were shutout for the third week in a row. Statistically Pitt matched the Gophers in first downs (13 to 13) and gained 277 yards to the Gophers 340, but could not reach the end zone. After a scoreless first quarter, Bill Daley scored twice in the second on 1-yard plunges. All-America back Bruce Smith was injured and replaced by Bob Higgins, who scampered 47 yards for the third touchdown. Bill Garnaas converted the extra points and Minnesota led 21 to 0 at halftime. The Gophers scored three second half touchdowns. Bill Garnaas's 70-yard interception return for a touchdown was sandwiched between two Bob Higgins short touchdown runs. One placement was blocked, one hit the crossbar and bounced back and one was wide. Final score 39–0. The Minnesota Gophers finished the season unbeaten and were named National Champions in the final Associated Press football poll for the second year in a row.

The Pitt starting lineup for the game against Minnesota was Stanley Gervelis (left end), Harry Kindelberger (left tackle), George Mitchell (left guard), George Allshouse (center), Ralph Fife (right guard), William Benghouser (right tackle), Harold Hinte (right end), Walter West (quarterback), Edgar Jones (left halfback), Joe Connell (right halfback) and Mat Gebel (fullback). Substitutes appearing in the game for Pitt were Michael Sotak, Jack Durishan, Steve Sinclair, James Clowes, Vincent Antonelli, Joe Salvucci, John Stahl, Ralph Hammond, Jack Stetler, Harold Stickel, William Dutton and John Ross.

Scoring summary

Quarter	Time	Drive			Team	Scoring information	Score	
Quarter	Time	Plays	Yards	TOP	Team	Scoring information	Pittsburgh	Minnesota
2		7	65		Minnesota	Bill Daley 1-yard touchdown run, Bill Garnaas kick good	0	7
2		5	52		Minnesota	Bill Daley 1-yard touchdown run, Bill Garnaas kick good	0	14
2		6	60		Minnesota	Bob Higgins 47-yard touchdown run, Bill Garnaas kick good	0	21
3		4	21		Minnesota	Bob Higgins 2-yard touchdown run, Bill Garnaas kick no good (blocked)	0	27
3		1	70		Minnesota	Interception returned 70 yards for touchdown by Bill Garnaas, Bill Daley kick no good	0	33
4		6	55		Minnesota	Bob Higgins 1-yard touchdown run, Bill Garnaas kick no good	0	39
"TOP" = time of possession. For other American football terms, see Glossary of American football.							0	39

=== Duke ===
Week 4: Duke at Pitt

Team	1	2	3	4	Total
• Duke	6	0	14	7	27
Pitt	0	0	0	7	7

- Date: October 25, 1941
- Location: Pitt Stadium
  Pittsburgh, PA
- Game start: 2:00 p.m.
- Game attendance: 28,000
- Game weather: sunny and cool
- Referee: Leo Daley (Boston College)

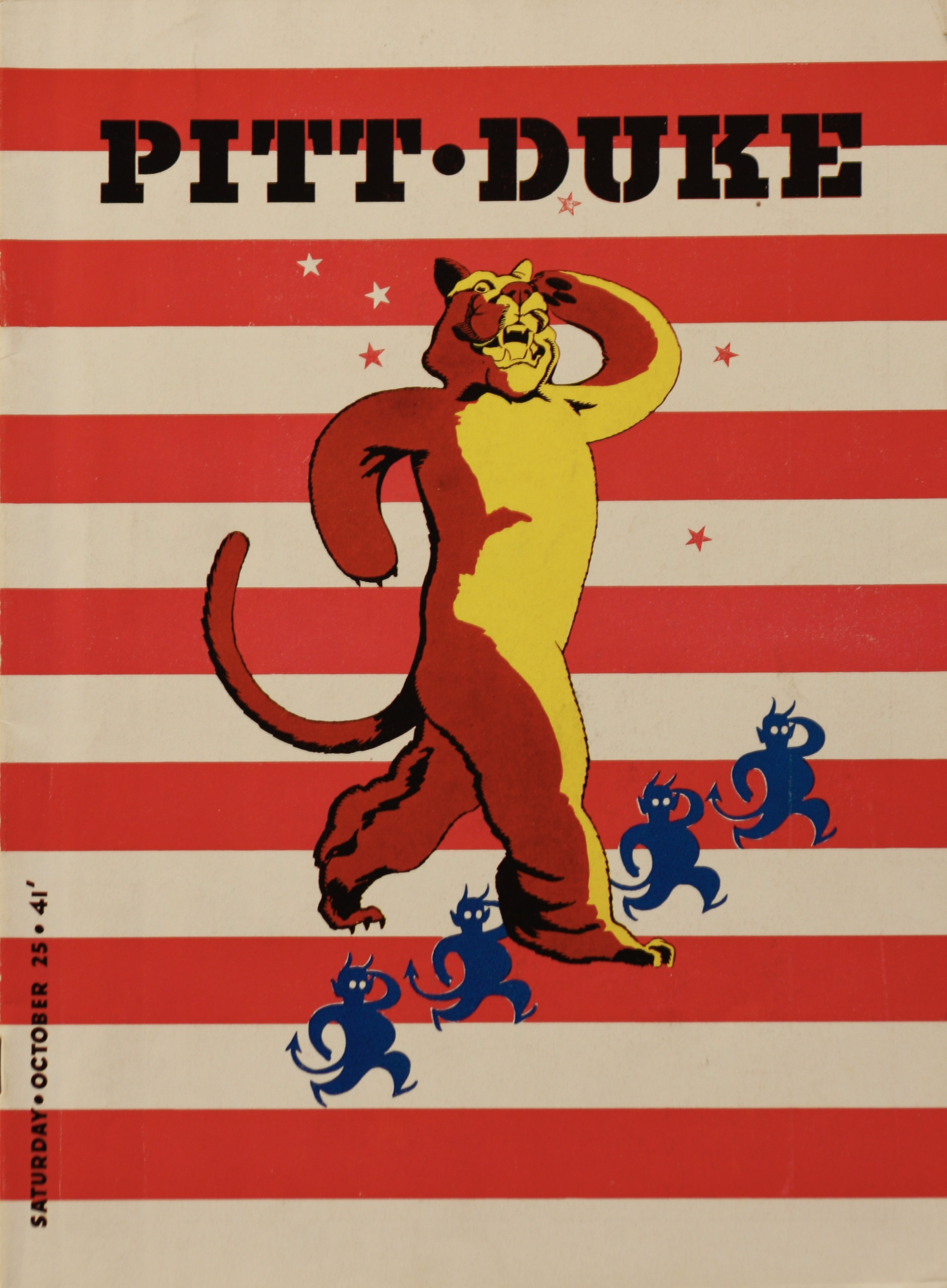
Program for October 25 game versus Duke

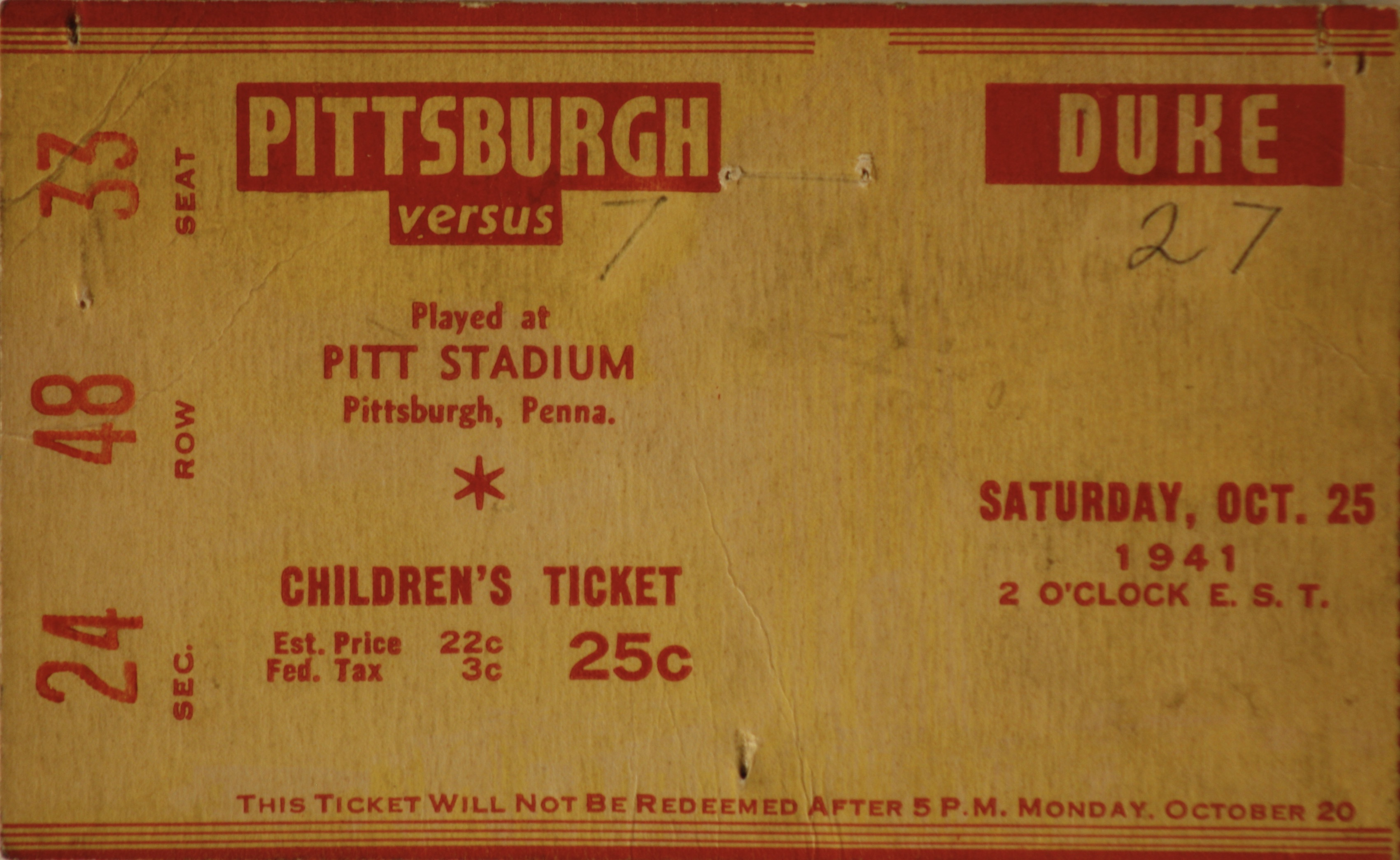
Ticket stub for October 25 game versus Duke

On October 25, the Duke Blue Devils came to Pittsburgh for the second time in the six-game series. Pitt led the series 3–2, but Wallace Wade's club had won two of the past three. The Devils were 4–0, ranked #4 and had outscored their opposition 139–28. Fullback Steve Lach and tackle Mike Karmazin received All-American honors. Coach Wade told the Sun-Telegraph: "Some people have the idea we are shooting for a Rose Bowl bid. That idea definitely is wrong. We are not thinking of any post-season game. I doubt if the faculty committee would accept a bid if we were to receive one. The committee debated a full day before accepting the 1938 Rose Bowl bid. The school authorities feel that the football players are away from their work too long by the extension of the season through the holidays."

In front of 28,000 faithful fans, the Panthers suffered their fourth loss in a row to the Devils 27–7. Duke opened the scoring in the first period with a 35-yard touchdown pass from halfback Moffat Storer to halfback Steve Lach. Blue Devils' quarterback Tommy Prothro missed the point after. At the end of the second quarter, Pitt's Edgar Jones threw a 60-yard pass to end Stanley Gervelis but Duke halfback Tom Davis intercepted it on the 3-yard line as time ran out in the first half. The Panthers' defense gave up three touchdowns in the second half. Duke fullback Winston Siegfried plunged into the end zone from the 1-yard line, after a 55-yard, 16-play drive. Panther errors resulted in the final two Blue Devil scores. A Walter West fumble recovered by center Bob Barnett gave Duke possession on the Panthers' 26-yard line. Tom Davis scored on the second play. Later, Duke end Bob Gantt blocked a Joe Connell punt and Duke recovered on the Pitt 31-yard line. Duke's seventh play was a 5-yard touchdown pass from Tom Davis to Steve Lach. Tom Prothro converted the three placements and Duke led 27 to 0. The Pitt offense answered with a 17-play, 65-yard drive for their first score of the season. Substitute running back William Dutton gained 48 of the yards on seven carries, but John Ross broke through center from the 2-yard line for the touchdown. Ralph Fife converted the extra point to make the final score 27–7.

Duke finished the regular season ranked #2 in the final Associated Press football poll with a record of 9–0. They were invited to play in the 1942 Rose Bowl, that was played in Durham, NC for national safety reasons, and lost to the Oregon State Beavers 20–16.

Coach Bowser told The Press: "Well, we finally cracked the ice. The boys showed they at least can score, and now mebbe [sic] we can go ahead from here." The Pitt News reporters joked: "Hooray, no school Monday. Our side got a touchdown."

The Pitt starting lineup for the game against Duke was Stanley Gervelis (left end), Harry Kindelberger (left tackle), George Mitchell (left guard), George Allshouse (center), Ralph Fife (right guard), William Benghouser (right tackle), Harold Hinte (right end), Walter West (quarterback), Edgar Jones (left halfback), Joe Connell (right halfback) and Mat Gebel (fullback). Substitutes appearing in the game for Pitt were Jack Durishan, William Dillon, Joe Salvucci, John Stahl, Ralph Hammond, Jack Stetler, Frank Saksa, William Dutton and John Ross.

Scoring summary

Quarter	Time	Drive			Team	Scoring information	Score	
Quarter	Time	Plays	Yards	TOP	Team	Scoring information	Duke	Pittsburgh
1		4	64		Duke	Steve Lach 35-yard touchdown reception from Moffat Storer, Tommy Prothjro kick no good	6	0
3		16	55		Duke	Winston Siegfried 1-yard touchdown run, Tommy Prothro kick good	13	0
3		2	26		Duke	Tom Davis 8-yard touchdown run, Tommy Prothro kick good	20	0
4		7	31		Duke	Steve Lach 5-yard touchdown reception from Tom Davis, Tommy Prothjro kick good	27	0
4		17	65		Pitt	John Ross 2-yard touchdown run, Ralph Fife kick good	27	7
"TOP" = time of possession. For other American football terms, see Glossary of American football.							27	7

=== Ohio State ===
Week 5: Ohio State at Pitt

Team	1	2	3	4	Total
• Ohio State	6	6	7	2	21
Pitt	0	7	7	0	14

- Date: November 1, 1941
- Location: Pitt Stadium
  Pittsburgh, PA
- Game start: 2:00 p.m.
- Game attendance: 50,000
- Game weather: sunny and cool
- Referee: W. T. Halloran (Holy Cross)

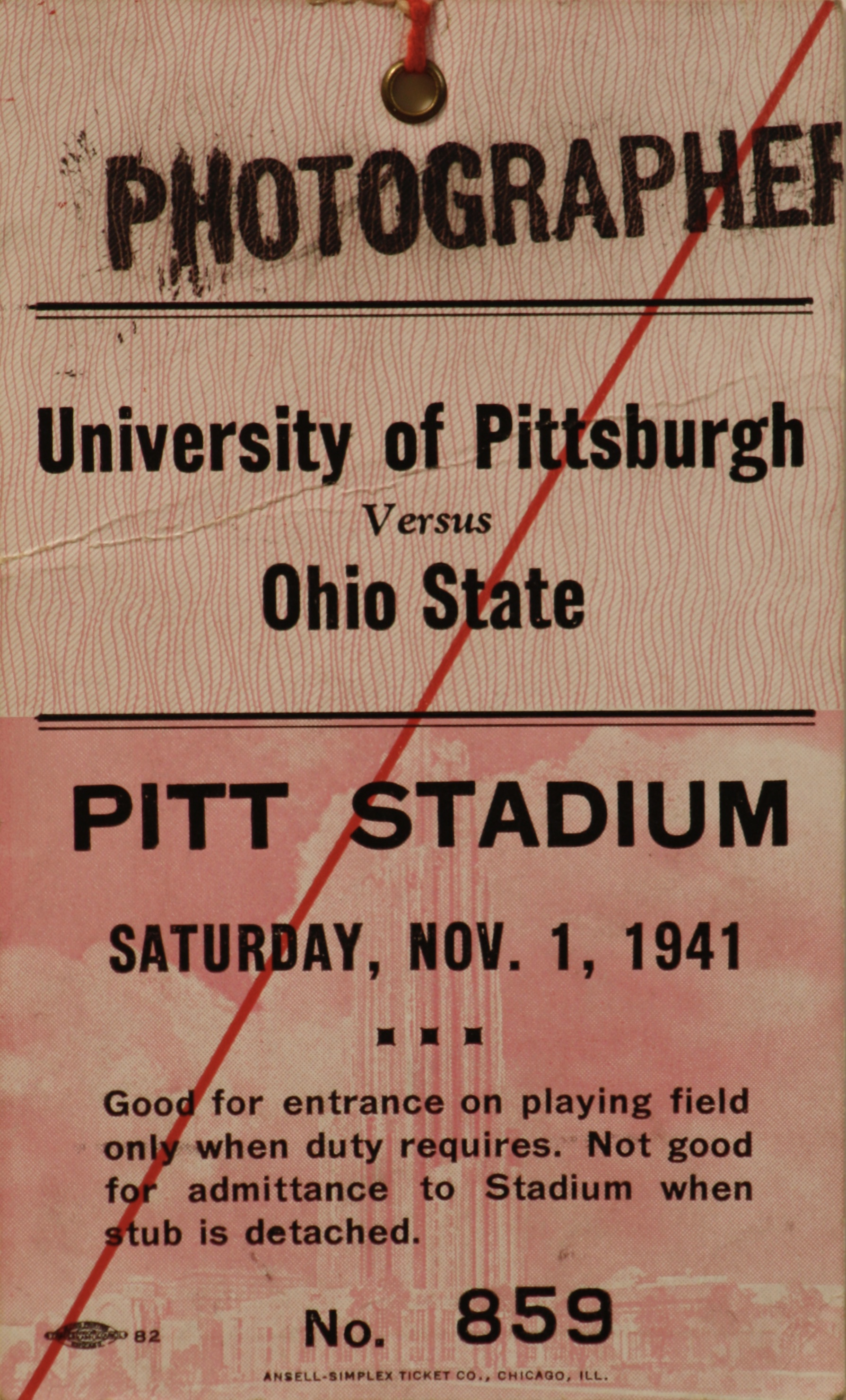
Photographer pass for the November 1 game versus Ohio State

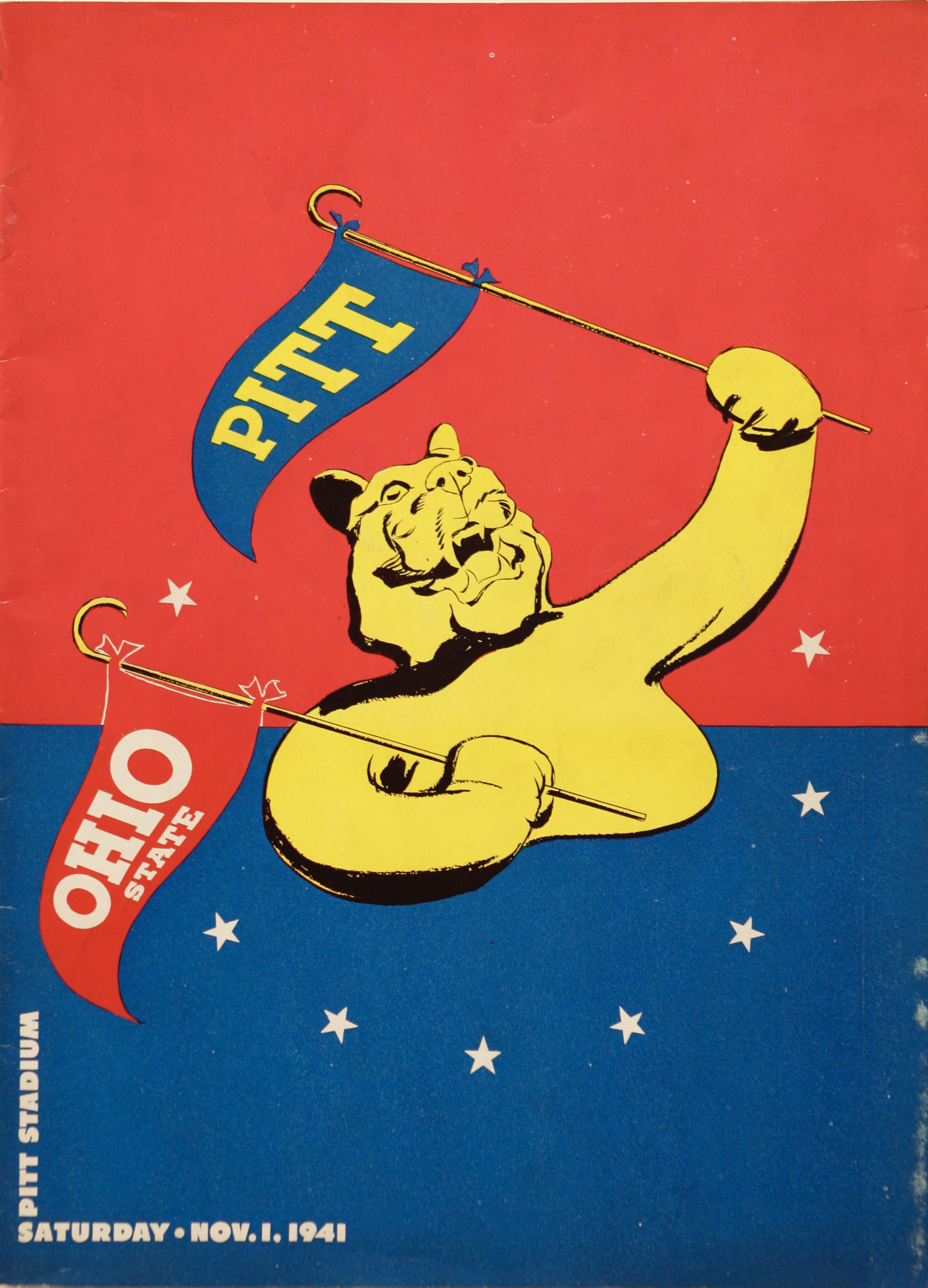
Program for November 1 game versus Ohio State

On November 1, the Panthers played the Ohio State Buckeyes, their fourth Western Conference opponent. The all-time series stood at 2–2–1. Paul Brown was in his first year and had the Buckeyes at 3–1 with victories over Missouri, USC and Purdue. Their only loss was to Northwestern who were led by Otto Graham. Buckeye tackle Jim Daniell (brother of Pitt great Averell Daniell) was named to the first team Central Press Association All-America squad. Prior to the Pitt game Coach Brown dismissed starting left end Charley Anderson from the squad for disobeying team rules. Sam Fox took his place and Dick Burgett started at fullback for the injured Jack Graf.

Charley Bowser revamped the Panther lineup for the Buckeyes - Jack Durishan replaced Harry Kindelberger at left tackle, John Stahl replaced Harold Hinte at right end, William Dutton replaced Joe Connell at right halfback, and Frank Saksa replaced Mat Gebel at fullback.

Coach Bowser's new lineup gave the Buckeyes a battle, but the Ohio eleven prevailed and kept the Panthers winless with a 21 to 14 victory. In the first quarter, Ohio guard Lindell Houston recovered a Stan Gervelis fumble on the Buckeyes 40-yard line. The Buckeyes drove 60 yards in three plays. Tom Kinkade went 32 yards around left end for the touchdown. Leon Schoenbaum's extra point was blocked. The next Ohio touchdown came in the second quarter. Fullback Burgett went over left guard from the 1-yard line to culminate a 7-play, 43-yard drive. Schoenbaum's kick was blocked again. The Panthers' offense answered with an 11-play, 82-yard drive. Frank Saksa bulled over center for the touchdown and Ralph Fife added the placement. Pitt got the ball back via fumble recovery on the Ohio 35-yard line. The Pitt offense moved the ball to the Ohio 14-yard line, where the Ohio State defense held and took over on downs. Ohio led 12 to 7 at halftime. The Buckeyes took the second half kick-off and drove 84-yards in 5 plays for their final touchdown of the game. Ohio back Dick Fisher ran 35-yards through right tackle for the score. Schoenbaum converted the placement and Ohio led 19 to 7. Ohio regained possession and tried to pass. Pitt's Edgar "Special Delivery" Jones intercepted Fisher's pass and raced 45-yards for a touchdown. Fife kicked the point after and Pitt trailed 19 to 14. The OSU punter kept the Panthers deep in their own territory in the final period. Ohio guard George Cheroke broke through the Panthers' line and blocked a Jones punt into the end zone. Jones recovered the ball for a safety to end the scoring.

Ohio State finished the season ranked #13 in the Associated Press football poll with a 6–1–1 record.

The Pitt starting lineup for the game against Ohio State was Stanley Gervelis (left end), Jack Durshan (left tackle), George Mitchell (left guard), George Allshouse (center), Ralph Fife (right guard), William Benghouser (right tackle), John Stahl (right end), Walter West (quarterback), Edgar Jones (left halfback), William Dutton (right halfback) and Frank Saksa (fullback). Substitutes appearing in the game for Pitt were Michael Sotak, Harry Kindelberger, William Dillon, Joseph Broudy, Vincent Antonelli, Harold Hinte, Martin Rosepink, Ralph Hammond, Jack Stetler, and Joe Connell.

Scoring summary

Quarter	Time	Drive			Team	Scoring information	Score	
Quarter	Time	Plays	Yards	TOP	Team	Scoring information	Ohio State	Pittsburgh
1		3	60		Ohio State	Tom Kincade 32-yard touchdown run, Leon Schoenbaum kick no good (blocked)	6	0
2		7	43		Ohio State	Richard Burgett 1-yard touchdown run, Leon Schoenbaum kick no good (blocked)	12	0
2		11	82		Pitt	Frank Saksa 1-yard touchdown run, Ralph Fife kick good	12	7
3		5	84		Ohio State	Dick Fisher 35-yard touchdown run, Leon Schoenbaum kick good	19	7
3		1	45		Pitt	Interception returned 45 yards for touchdown by Edgar Jones, Ralph Fife kick good	19	14
4					Ohio State	Jones recovered blocked punt	21	14
"TOP" = time of possession. For other American football terms, see Glossary of American football.							21	14

=== Fordham ===
Week 6: Fordham at Pitt

Team	1	2	3	4	Total
Fordham	0	0	0	0	0
• Pitt	7	0	0	6	13

- Date: November 8, 1941
- Location: Pitt Stadium
  Pittsburgh, PA
- Game start: 2:00 p.m.
- Game attendance: 50,000
- Game weather: cold
- Referee: E. A. Geiges (Temple)

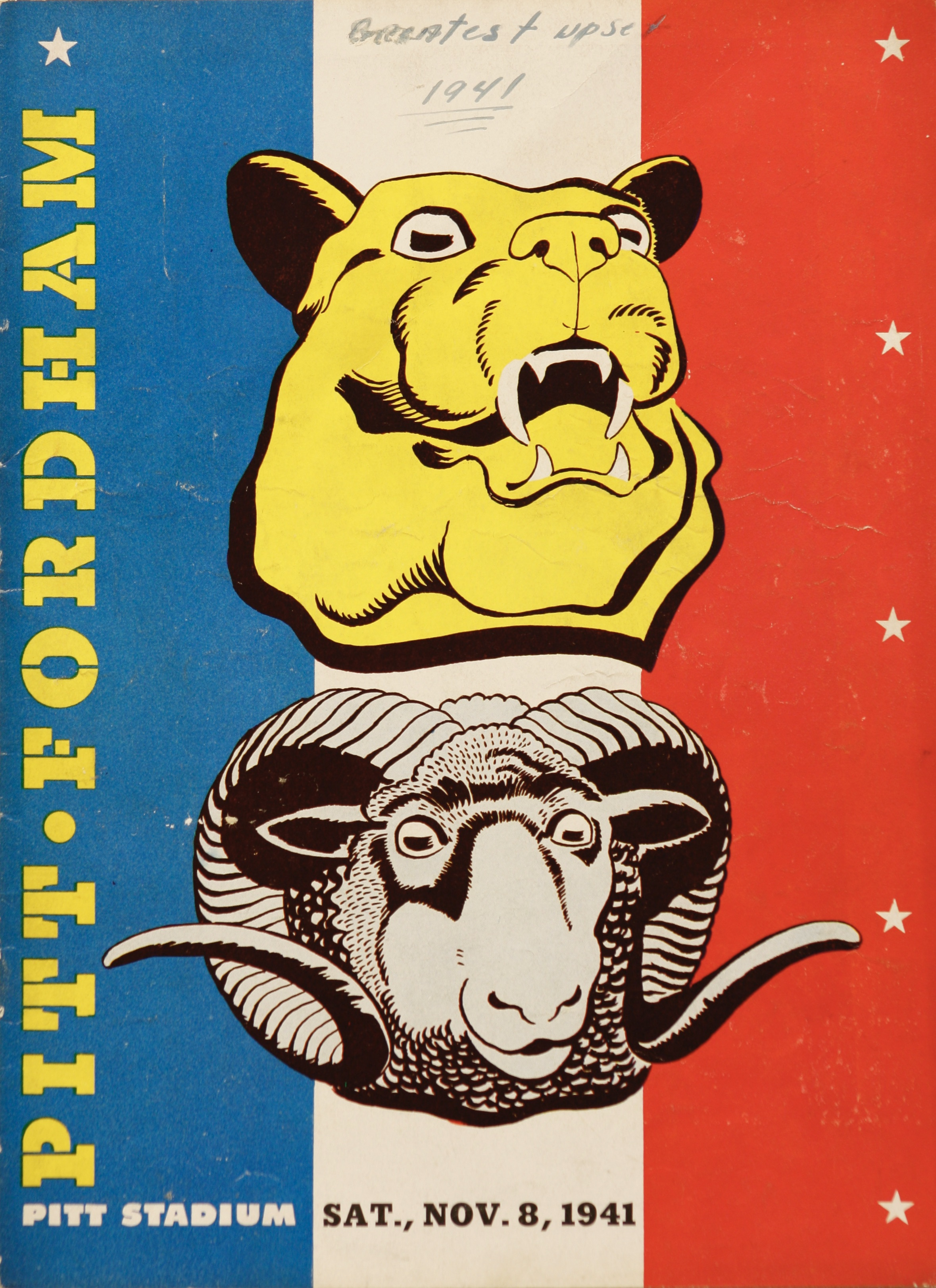
Program for November 8 game versus Fordham

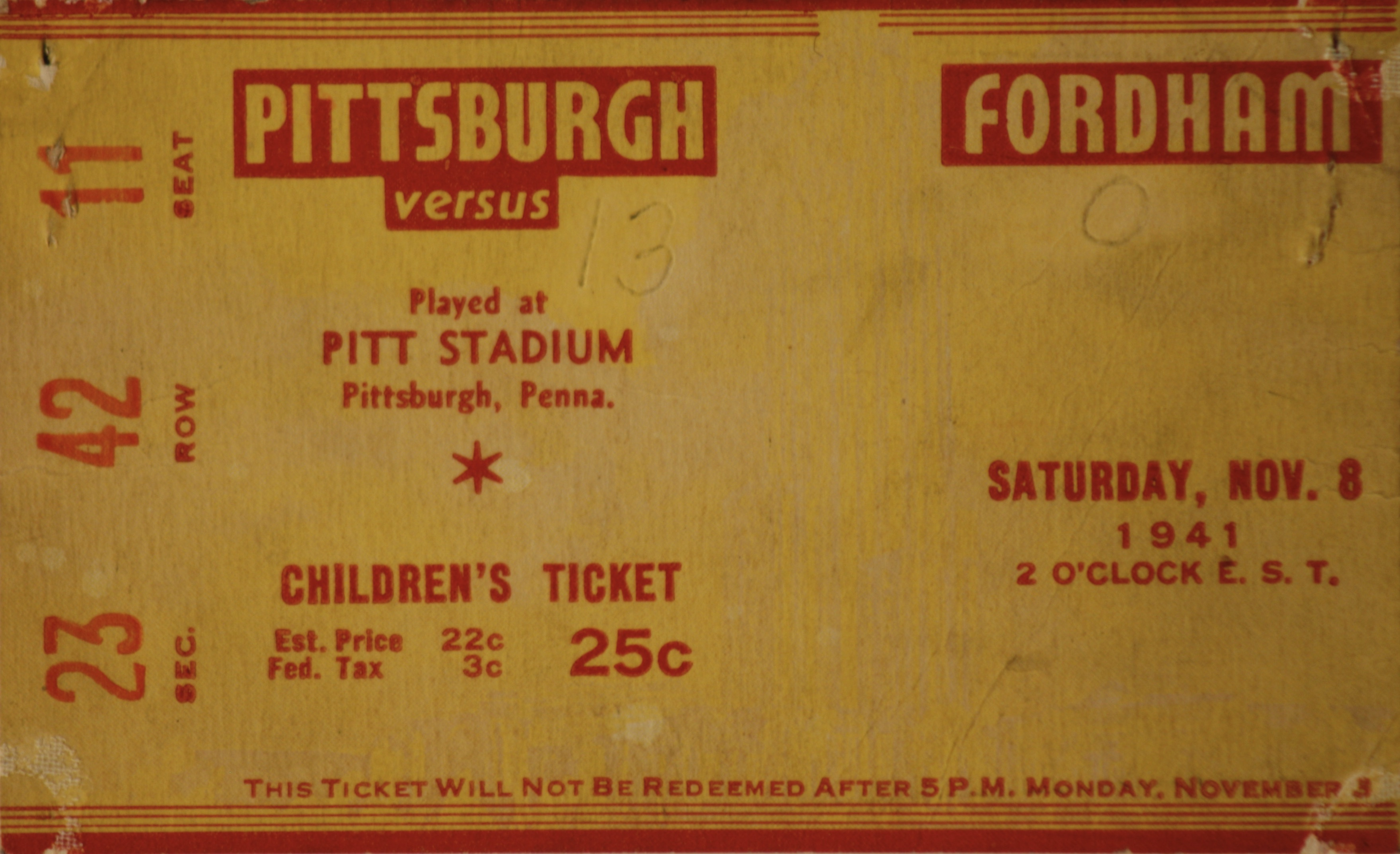
Ticket stub for November 8 game versus Fordham

On November 8, the Panthers met the unbeaten (5–0) Fordham Rams at Pitt Stadium. Jim Crowley's Rams had outscored their previous opponents 115–38, and, as 8–1 favorites with a #3 ranking in the AP poll, were favored to win their remaining games and return to a bowl. Fordham led the all-time series 2–1–3, and due to Pitt's football de-emphasis, this was the final meeting on the gridiron between the two schools. Sportswriters considered this Crowley's best team with end Jim Lansing, halfback Jim Blumenstock and fullback Steve Filipowicz earning All-America laurels. Crowley was cautious: "We are not over the hump yet by any means. We still have three ball clubs to meet and any one of them might come through with an upset...Fordham is in fine physical condition. The boys have played fine ball to date and I hope they can continue their fine pace."

In front of 20,000 fans, the Panthers shocked the football world with a 13–0 shutout of the Rams. After two exchanges of punts, the Panthers' offense gained possession on the Pitt 30-yard line. The Panthers' 11-play drive ended with fullback Frank Saksa's 1-yard plunge into the end zone. Ralph Fife converted the point after and Pitt led 7 to 0. The rest of the first half was mainly a punting duel. Late in the quarter, Fordham advanced into Pitt territory but Saksa intercepted an errant Filipowicz pass on the 12-yard line and returned the ball to the 37-yard line as time expired. In the third period, Fordham advanced the ball to the Pitt 13-yard line. A bad center snap lost 9 yards and the Pitt defense stiffened and took over on downs. In the fourth quarter, Edgar "Special Delivery" Jones intercepted a Benny Babula pass and raced 33 yards for the second touchdown. The extra point was blocked and Pitt led 13 to 0. The Panthers had to intercept two more passes before the upset was final.

Bowser was upbeat: "I believe this thing had been building up over quite some time. The boys have been improving steadily in recent games. For the first time this season they didn't make any mistakes. The boys were alert mentally, had lots of poise and most important, worked together as a unit....All our players did a grand job, and while the game proved our squad doesn't have much depth in material–it proved we could play good football."

Fordham finished the regular season with a 7–1 record and earned an invitation to the Sugar Bowl. They beat Missouri2–0 and were ranked #6 in the final Associated Press football poll.

Coach Charles Bowser was selected "Coach of the Week" by the United Press for the upset victory over the Rams.

The Pitt starting lineup for the game against Fordham was Stanley Gervelis (left end), Jack Dursihan (left tackle), William Dillon (left guard), George Allshouse (center), Ralph Fife (right guard), William Benghouser (right tackle), John Stahl (right end), Walter West (quarterback), Edgar Jones (left halfback), William Dutton (right halfback) and Frank Saksa (fullback). Substitutes appearing in the game for Pitt were Michael Sotak, Harry Kindelberger, Vincent Antonelli, Steve Sinclair, Albert Kunkel, Vincent Antonelli, Martin Rosepink, Jack Stetler and Joe Connell.

Scoring summary

Quarter	Time	Drive			Team	Scoring information	Score	
Quarter	Time	Plays	Yards	TOP	Team	Scoring information	Fordham	Pittsburgh
1		11	70		Pitt	Frank Saksa 1-yard touchdown run, Ralph Fife kick good	0	7
4		1	33		Pitt	Interception returned 33 yards for touchdown by Edgar Jones, Ralph Fife kick no good (blocked)	0	13
"TOP" = time of possession. For other American football terms, see Glossary of American football.							0	13

=== At Nebraska ===
Week 7: Pitt at Nebraska

Team	1	2	3	4	Total
• Pitt	0	0	0	14	14
Nebraska	0	7	0	0	7

- Date: November 15, 1941
- Location: Memorial Stadium (Lincoln)
  Lincoln, NE
- Game start: 2:00 p.m.
- Game attendance: 35,000
- Game weather: clear and warm
- Referee: Dwight Ream (Washburn)

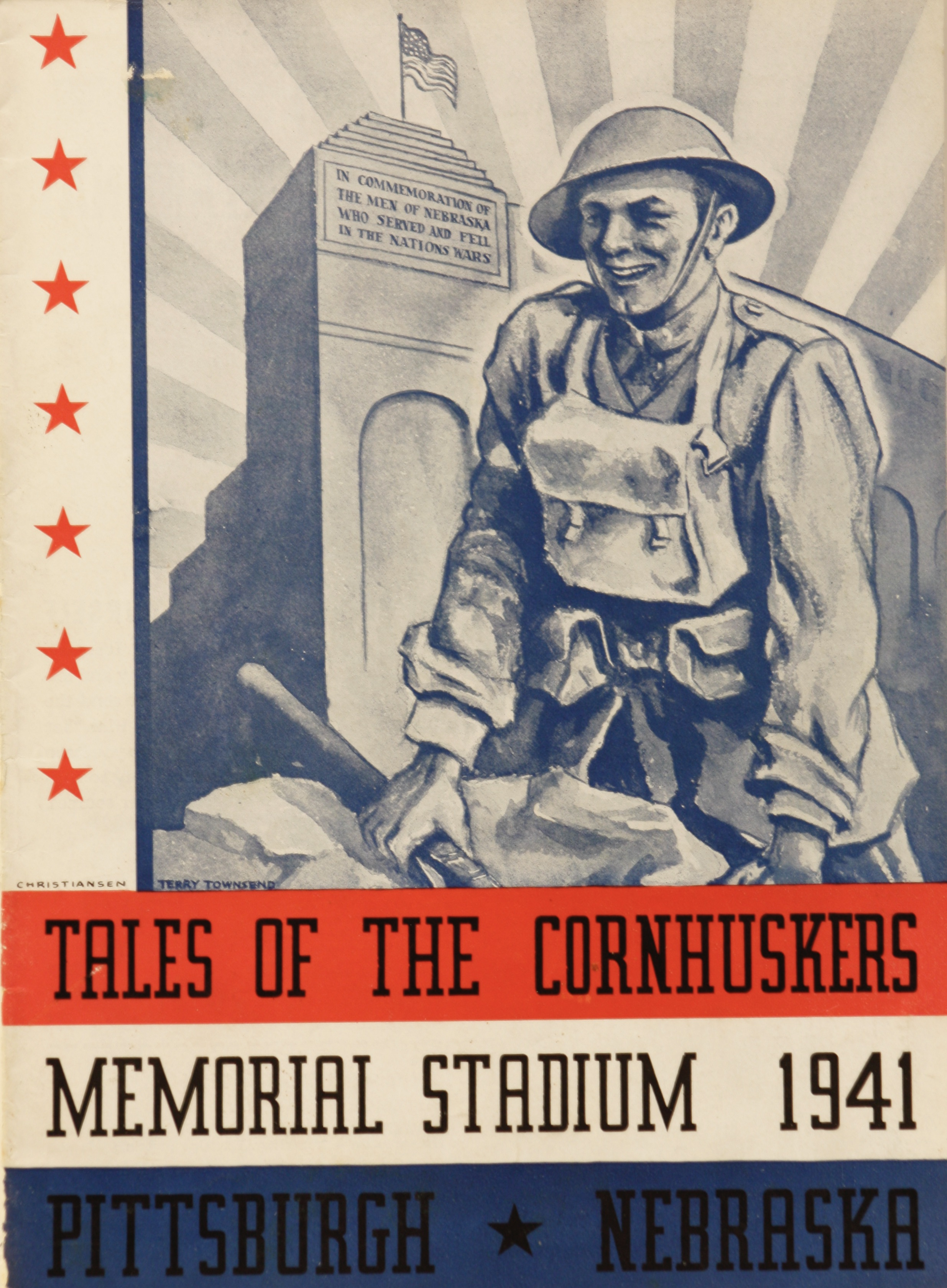
Program for the November 15 game versus Nebraska

On November 15, the Panthers traveled to Lincoln, NE for their annual game with the Nebraska Cornhuskers. Pitt led the series 9–3–3, but Nebraska won the previous two meetings in Pittsburgh. The Panthers were unbeaten in Lincoln (4–0–3). Eddie Beachler of The Press noted: "With Major Lawrence 'Biff' Jones losing 18 members of last year's Rose Bowl squad through graduation and the draft, the Huskers are no longer bossing the Big Six, a group which they ruled with an iron fist for nine of the past 13 years." The Huskers, after starting the season with 2 victories, were on a 4-game losing streak.

On Wednesday at 11 pm the 33-member Pitt squad boarded the train to Chicago, IL. The layover included a workout on Thursday at Chicago Stadium. They departed Thursday night and arrived in Omaha, NE on Friday morning. After a morning visit to Boys Town, Bowser held another workout at Benson field on Friday afternoon. The squad traveled the final 55 miles to Lincoln on Saturday morning. Harry Kindelberger started at tackle in place of the injured Jack Durishan.

The Panthers won their second game and kept their unbeaten streak in Lincoln intact with a 14 to 7 victory over the Cornhuskers. Nebraska scored first. In the second period Dale Bradley scored from the 3-yard line after the Huskers offense drove 68 yards in 10 plays. Vic Schleich converted the extra point and Nebraska led 7 to 0 at halftime. After the break, the Huskers offense drove 77 yards in 18 plays to the Pitt 3-yard line, but lost the ball on downs. With ten minutes left in the game, Pitt gained possession on their own 38-yard line. Eleven plays later Bill Dutton bulled into the end zone from the 1-yard line, and Ralph Fife converted the point after to tie the score. The teams exchanged punts. Pitt back Edgar "Special Delivery" Jones intercepted Bradley's pass and raced 75 yards for a touchdown. Fife booted the point and Pitt led 14 to 7 with 15 seconds left. Nebraska went to the air again and Jones intercepted an errant Howard Debus pass and raced 48 yards before he was tackled on the 3-yard line as time ran out.

In what was Biff Jones' final season, Nebraska finished with a 4–5 record.

The Pitt starting lineup for the game against Nebraska was Stanley Gervelis (left end), Harry Kindelberger (left tackle), William Dillon (left guard), George Allshouse (center), Ralph Fife (right guard), William Benghouser (right tackle), John Stahl (right end), Walter West (quarterback), Edgar Jones (left halfback), Joe Connell (right halfback) and Frank Saksa (fullback). Substitutes appearing in the game for Pitt were Jack Durshan, George Mitchell, Steve Sinclair, Vincent Antonelli, Martin Rosepink, Ralph Hammond, Harold Stickel and William Dutton.

Scoring summary

Quarter	Time	Drive			Team	Scoring information	Score	
Quarter	Time	Plays	Yards	TOP	Team	Scoring information	Pittsburgh	Nebraska
2		10	67		Nebraska	Dale Bradley 2-yard touchdown run, Vic Schleich kick good	0	7
4		11	62		Pittsburgh	Bill Dutton 1-yard touchdown run, Ralph Fife kick good	7	7
4		1	75		Pitt	Interception returned 75 yards for touchdown by Edgar Jones, Ralph Fife kick good	14	7
"TOP" = time of possession. For other American football terms, see Glossary of American football.							14	7

=== Penn State ===
Week 8: Penn State at Pitt

Team	1	2	3	4	Total
• Penn State	0	14	10	7	31
Pitt	7	0	0	0	7

- Date: November 22, 1941
- Location: Pitt Stadium
  Pittsburgh, PA
- Game start: 2:00 p.m.
- Game attendance: 33,000
- Game weather: sunny and cool
- Referee: F. X. Keating (Fitchburg)

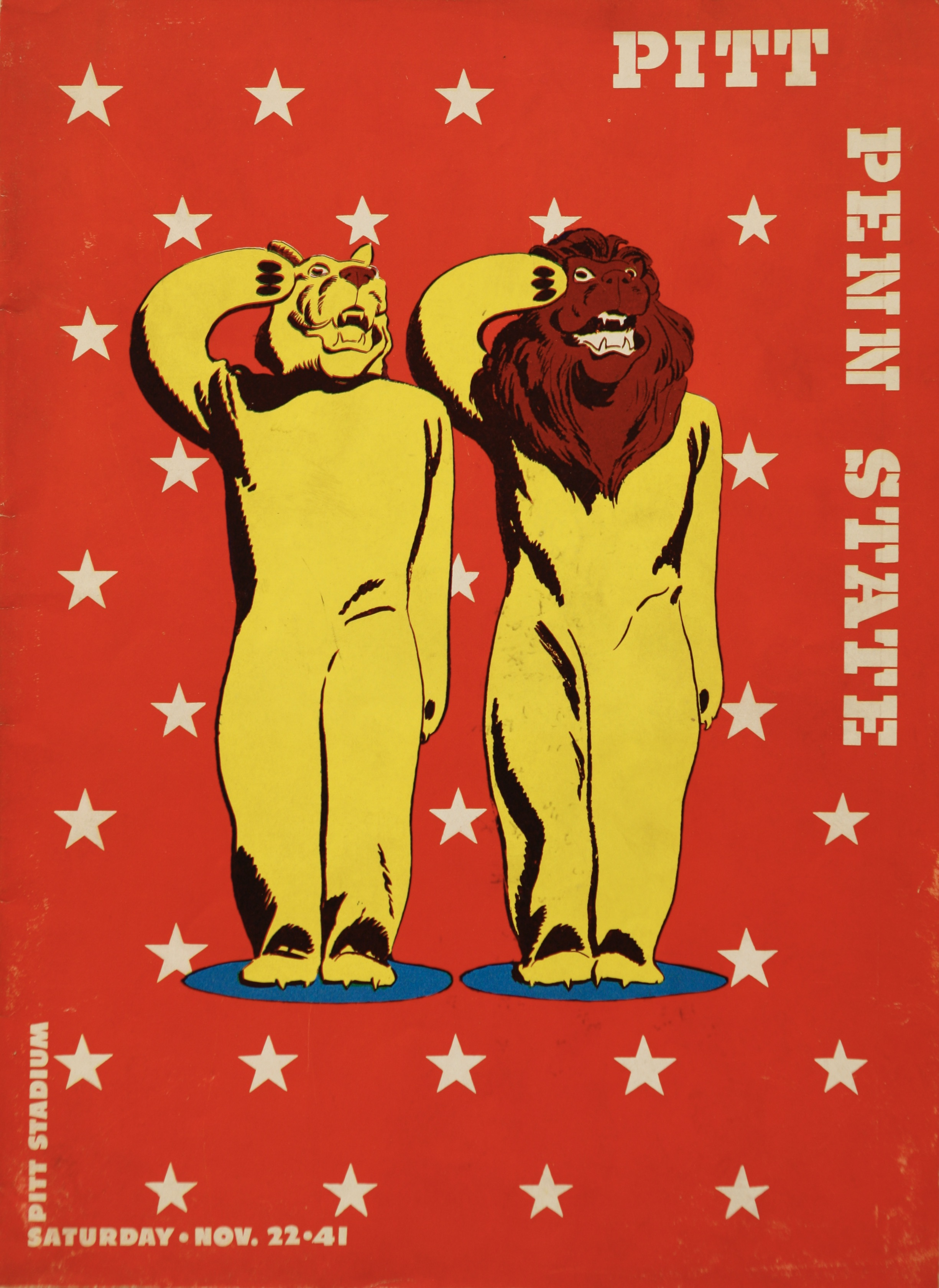
Program for November 22 game versus Penn State

On November 22, the 5–2 Penn State Nittany Lions, led by 12-year coach Bob Higgins, was Pitt's opponent. The Lions lost 2 of their first 3 games, but arrived in Pittsburgh on a 4-game win streak. The Panthers led the all-time series 24–14–2, but Coach Higgins was optimistic: "In past years we just haven't had a chance. Pitt's third team usually was as good as our varsity. Last year we had a pretty good chance but got off to a bad start and never regained our balance. We'll give them a battle this time, right down to the finish."

Coach Higgins was right as his Lions pummeled the Panthers 31 to 7. Pitt opened the scoring in the first quarter. The Panther offense engineered a 3-play, 57-yard drive highlighted by a 43-yard touchdown run by Edgar Jones on a reverse. Jones ran the fumbled extra point snap into the end zone to make the score 7 to 0. The Penn State eleven dominated the rest of the contest. John "Pepper" Petrella scored three touchdowns and Ralph Ventresco added another. Bill Smaltz converted on all four extra points and booted a 16-yard field goal. The Lions earned 14 first downs. They gained 171 yards rushing and 90 yards through the air by completing 6 of 12 passes. The Panthers only managed 4 first downs and 81 yards rushing.

Coach Bowser stated: "We were simply outcharged and outfought." Penn State was "as tough a team as we've met this year."

The Pitt starting lineup for the game against Penn State was Stanley Gervelis (left end), Jack Durishan (left tackle), William Dillon (left guard), George Allshouse (center), Ralph Fife (right guard), William Benghouser (right tackle), John Stahl (right end), Walter West (quarterback), Edgar Jones (left halfback), William Dutton (right halfback) and Frank Saksa (fullback). Substitutes appearing in the game for Pitt were Michael Sotak, Harry Hindelberger, George Mitchell, Steve Sinclair, Vincent Antonelli, Joe Salvucci, Martin Rosepink, Ralph Hammond, Jack Stetler and Joe Connell.

Scoring summary

Quarter	Time	Drive			Team	Scoring information	Score	
Quarter	Time	Plays	Yards	TOP	Team	Scoring information	Penn State	Pittsburgh
1		3	57		Pittsburgh	Edgar Jones 43-yard touchdown run, Ralph Fife kick not attempted, Jones recovered fumbled snap for extra point	0	7
2		7	53		Penn State	John “Pepper” Petrella 1-yard touchdown run, Bill Smaltz kick good	7	7
2		4	12		Penn State	John “Pepper” Petrella 2-yard touchdown run, Bill Smaltz kick good	14	7
3		6	51		Penn State	John “Pepper” Petrella 24-yard touchdown run, Bill Smaltz kick good	21	7
3		4	3		Penn State	16-yard field goal by Bill Smaltz	24	7
4		8	44		Penn State	Ralph Ventresco 1-yard touchdown run, Bill Smaltz kick good	31	7
"TOP" = time of possession. For other American football terms, see Glossary of American football.							31	7

=== Carnegie Tech ===
Week 9: Carnegie Tech at Pitt

Team	1	2	3	4	Total
Carnegie Tech	0	0	0	0	0
• Pitt	0	13	7	7	27

- Date: November 29, 1941
- Location: Pitt Stadium
  Pittsburgh, PA
- Game start: 2:00 p.m.
- Game attendance: 19,000
- Game weather: sunny and cool
- Referee: H. O. Dayhoff (Bucknell)

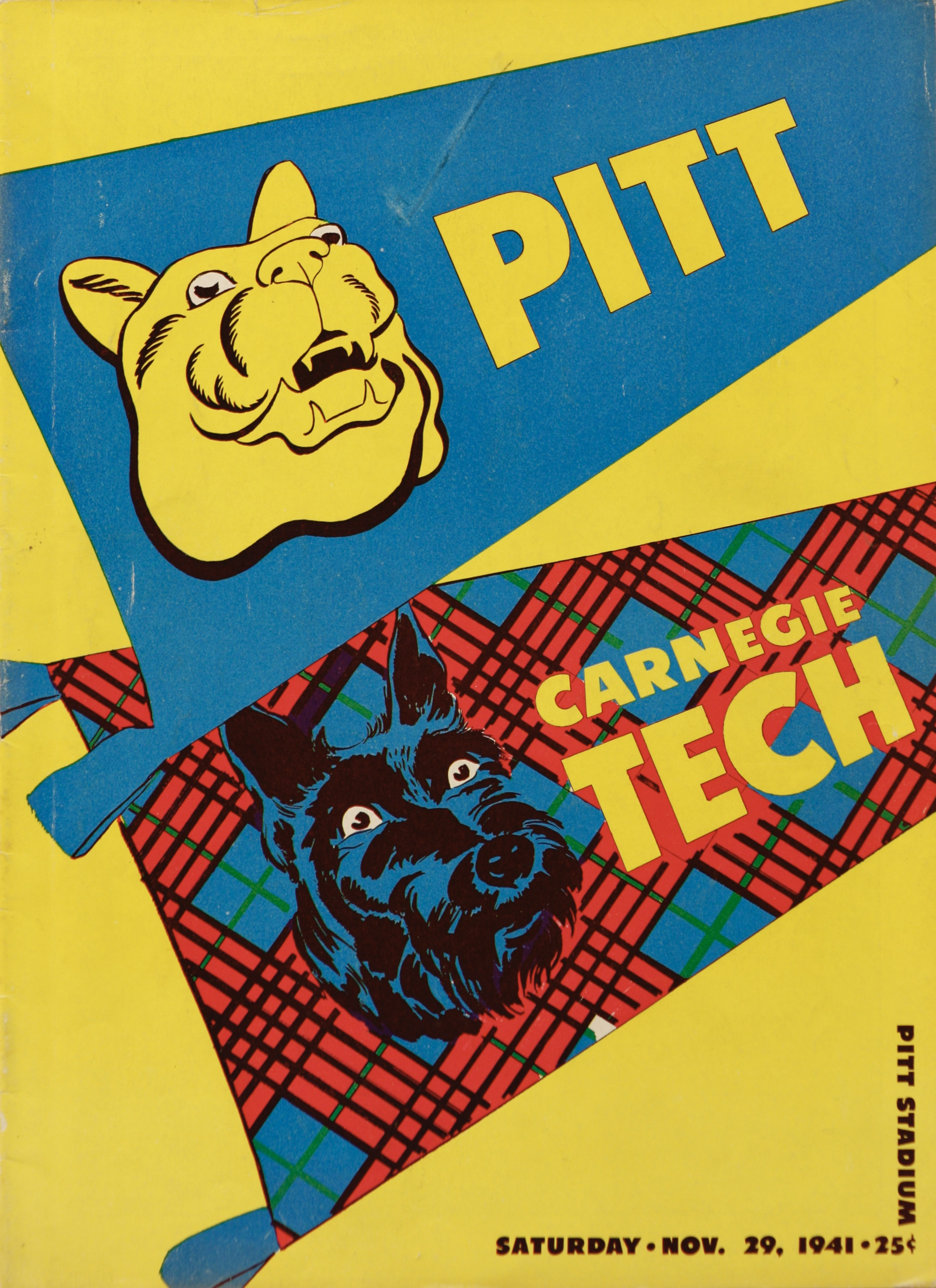
Program for November 29 game versus Carnegie Tech

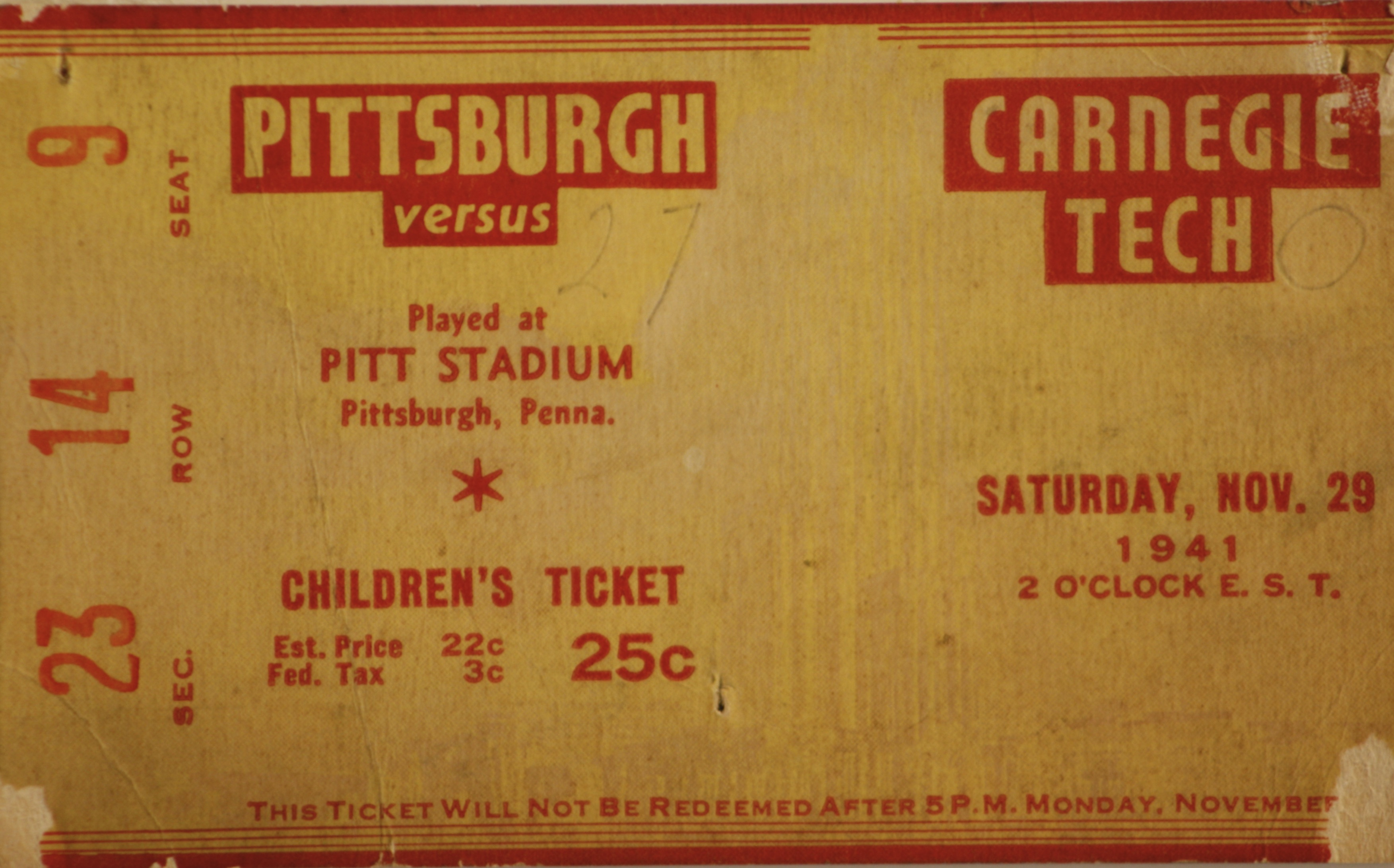
Ticket stub for November 29 game versus Carnegie Tech

On November 29, the (2–6) Pitt Panthers were matched against the (1–6) Carnegie Tech Tartans in the final game of the season for both schools. Pitt led the once heralded "City Game" series 21–5–1. Tartan coach Eddie Baker's squad numbered only 23 and his best running back, Virgil Cantini, was injured and would not play. Tackle Lou Zelenka, who enlisted in the Army earlier in the week, received permission to play.

Fifteen seniors were playing their final game as Panthers – Al Kunkel, Ralph Fife, Stan Gervelis, Joe Connell, John Ross, Hap Stickel, Ray Rabinek, Stave Sinclair, Bill Benghouser, John Stahl, Robert Crissman, Harry Kindelberger, George Mitchell, George Allshouse and Edgar Jones.

The Panthers dominated the Tartans and won 27–0 for their third victory of the season. The Panther offense drove the ball 78-yards to open the game, but the Tartan defense held and took over on downs at their 1-yard line. After an exchange of punts the Panther offense gained possession on the Tartan 43-yard line. Bill Dutton capped the touchdown drive with a two-yard plunge. Ralph Fife's point after was blocked by Bill Philipchuck. Late in the half, Edgar Jones fielded a punt on the Tech 39-yard line. He lost 6 yards on first down, but on second down he raced 45 yards for the touchdown. Fife was good on the placement and Pitt led 13–0 at halftime. Early in the third period Dutton intercepted an errant Tartan pass on the Panther 34-yard line. The 5-play, 66-yard drive ended with an 18-yard reverse from Joe Connell to Edgar Jones for the touchdown. Fife booted the point and Pitt led 20–0. The Pitt reserves played most of the second half. Late in the game the Panther offense marched 78 yards for the final touchdown. Dutton bulled into the end zone from 2-yards out. The referees debated for some time before awarding the touchdown. Joe Connell added the point after to close the scoring. Statistics proved Pitt's domination. The Panthers had 18 first downs to Tech's 4 and 293 rushing yards to Tech's 24.

Immediately after the game, Edgar "Special Delivery" Jones left for New York to participate in a charity football game on Sunday at the Polo Grounds. An All-Star Negro eleven played against a team of college stars and some New York Yankee pros. The Yankees won 24–20.

The Pitt starting lineup for the game against Carnegie Tech was Stanley Gervelis (left end), Jack Durishan (left tackle), William Dillon (left guard), George Allshouse (center), Ralph Fife (right guard), William Benghouser (right tackle), John Stahl (right end), Walter West (quarterback), Edgar Jones (left halfback), William Dutton (right halfback) and Frank Saksa (fullback). Substitutes appearing in the game for Pitt were Michael Sotak, Norbert Gestner, Harry Kindelberger, John Shaffer, George Mitchell, Steve Sinclair, Albert Kunkel, Vincent Antonelli, Ray Rabinek, Joe Salvucci, Robert Crissman, Martin Rosepink, Frank Scatton, John Stetler, Harold Stickel, Joseph Connell, Bruce Reuter, Joseph Adamchic, Mat Gebel and John Ross.

Scoring summary

Quarter	Time	Drive			Team	Scoring information	Score	
Quarter	Time	Plays	Yards	TOP	Team	Scoring information	Carnegie Tech	Pittsburgh
2			43		Pittsburgh	Bill Dutton 2-yard touchdown run, Ralph Fife kick blocked	0	6
2		2	39		Pittsburgh	Edgar "Special Delivery" Jones 45-yard touchdown run, Ralph Fife kick good	0	13
3		5	66		Pittsburgh	Edgar "Special Delivery" Jones 18-yard touchdown run, Ralph Fife kick good	0	20
4			78		Pittsburgh	Bill Dutton 1-yard touchdown run, Joe Connell kick good	0	27
"TOP" = time of possession. For other American football terms, see Glossary of American football.							0	27

== Individual scoring summary ==
1941 Pittsburgh Panthers scoring summary
Player	Touchdowns	Extra points	Field goals	Safety	Points
Edgar Jones	6	1	0	0	37
Bill Dutton	3	0	0	0	18
Frank Saksa	2	0	0	0	12
Ralph Fife	0	8	0	0	8
John Ross	1	0	0	0	6
Joe Connell	0	1	0	0	1
Totals	12	10	0	0	82

== Postseason ==
Guard Ralph Fife was named first team All-America by the Associated Press. On December 5, Fife was awarded a gold watch during the Kate Smith radio hour by Fordham coach Jim Crowley for being a member of the "Kate Smith All-American Football squad." He was named second team All-American by NEA, Ted Husing of CBS, and the United Press.

Halfback Edgar "Special Delivery" Jones received honorable mentions on both the International News Service and United Press All-American football teams. Coach Carl Snavely chose Jones for the North squad in the annual North-South All-Star game on Christmas Day.

Coaches Andy Kerr and Bernie Bierman chose Fife and end Stanley Gervelis to play for the East squad in the annual East-West Shrine Game in San Francisco on New Year's Day. After the attack on Pearl Harbor, the game was moved to Tulane Stadium in New Orleans and played on January 3, 1942 for security reasons.

== Team players drafted into the NFL ==
The following players were selected in the 1942 NFL draft.

Player	Position	Round	Pick	NFL club
Stan Gervelis	End	14	127	Brooklyn Dodgers
Edgar Jones	Back	19	180	Chicago Bears
