= Charley Bowser =

American football player and coach (1898–1989)

Biographical details
- Born: November 29, 1898; Ligonier, Pennsylvania, U.S.
- Died: July 29, 1989 (aged 90); Royal Oak, Michigan, U.S.

Playing career
- 1922: Pittsburgh
- Positions: End, quarterback, tackle, center

Coaching career (HC unless noted)
- 1923: Grove City (assistant)
- 1924–1926: Grove City
- 1927–1929: Pittsburgh (assistant)
- 1930–1934: Bowdoin
- 1935–1937: Pittsburgh (assistant)
- 1939–1942: Pittsburgh

Head coaching record
- Overall: 40–47–6

Charles W. Bowser (November 29, 1898 – July 29, 1989) was an American football coach. He served as the head football coach at Grove City College from 1924 to 1926, at Bowdoin College from 1930 to 1934, and at the University of Pittsburgh from 1939 to 1942, compiling a career college football record of 40–47–6.

== Early life ==
Bowser was born in Ligonier, Pennsylvania and attended Johnstown High School, where he played high school football. He left high school as a senior, in April 1918, in order to enlist in the Army. From May 1918 to April 1919, he served overseas in the Ambulance Corps.

In 1919, Bowser enrolled at the University of Pittsburgh. That season, he played on the freshman football team under freshman coach Andy Kerr. The following year, he joined the varsity team under head coach Pop Warner, and played at end, quarterback, tackle, and center. Bowser earned a varsity letter in 1922. He studied business administration and was a member of the Beta Gamma Sigma and Omicron Delta Kappa honor societies.

== Coaching career ==
Upon graduation from Pittsburgh, Bowser served as an assistant at Grove City College under Guy "Chalky" Williamson. After the 1923 season, Williamson left for the Pittsburgh football staff, and Bowser took over as Grove City head coach. The Grove City Crimson went 3–5–1 in his first season, but improved in the next two years. In 1925, they posted a 7–1 record, with the sole loss coming against West Virginia. The next season, Grove City finished with a perfect 7–0 mark, including a 3–0 victory against Bo McMillin's Geneva College which defeated Harvard.

In 1927, Bowser returned to Pittsburgh, to aid head coach Jock Sutherland as the ends, backs, and centers mentor. In 1930, Bowser took over as the head coach of Bowdoin College, a post he held through 1934. He was replaced by Adam Walsh, former captain of the Notre Dame Fighting Irish. Bowser then became assistant at Pitt again in 1935, and in 1937, he was promoted to the chief assistant position.

After that season, he left the coaching ranks to work as an insurance agent in Pittsburgh. In 1939, Bowser returned to Pittsburgh as its head coach, and served in that position through the 1942 season. He resigned his post in January 1943 to take a commission in the United States Navy during World War II. He was replaced by T formation innovator Clark Shaughnessy.

== Later life and death ==
Bowser resided in Royal Oak, Michigan during the last 13 years. He died of heart failure there on July 29, 1989.

== Head coaching record ==
Year	Team	Overall	Conference	Standing	Bowl/playoffs
Grove City Crimson (Independent) (1924–1926)
1924	Grove City	3–5–1			
1925	Grove City	7–1			
1926	Grove City	7–0			
Grove City:		17–6–1			
Bowdoin Polar Bears (Independent) (1930–1934)
1930	Bowdoin	4–2–1			
1931	Bowdoin	0–7			
1932	Bowdoin	2–3–2			
1933	Bowdoin	3–3–1			
1934	Bowdoin	0–6–1			
Bowdoin:		9–21–4			
Pittsburgh Panthers (Independent) (1939–1942)
1939	Pittsburgh	5–4			
1940	Pittsburgh	3–4–1			
1941	Pittsburgh	3–6			
1942	Pittsburgh	3–6			
Pittsburgh:		14–20–1			
Total:		40–47–6			
