= Pepper Petrella =

American football player (1920–1991)

- Petrella, circa 1945

No. 11, 42
- Position: Halfback

Personal information
- Born: May 7, 1920; Downingtown, Pennsylvania, U.S.
- Died: December 21, 1991 (aged 71); Broward County, Florida, U.S.
- Listed height: 5 ft 7 in (1.70 m)
- Listed weight: 160 lb (73 kg)

Career information
- High school: Downingtown
- College: Penn State (1938–1941)

Career history
- Pittsburgh Steelers (1945); Altoona Mountaineers (1946–1947); Bethlehem Bulldogs (1949)
- Stats at Pro Football Reference

John Anton "Pepper" Petrella (May 7, 1920 – December 21, 1991) was an American professional football player who was a halfback for the Pittsburgh Steelers of the National Football League (NFL). He played college football for the Penn State Nittany Lions.

== Early life ==
John Anton Petrella was born on May 7, 1920, in Downingtown, Pennsylvania. He attended Downingtown High School.

== College career ==
Petrella enrolled at Pennsylvania State University to play college football for the Nittany Lions. He was quarterback of the freshman team in 1938. He was a three-year varsity letterman from 1939 to 1941 as a halfback. He led the team in scoring during the 1941 season with 72 points (12 touchdowns). Petrella also rushed 178 times for a team-leading 596 yards.

== Military service ==
Petrella served in the United States Army Air Forces during World War II. He was assigned to the crew of a North American B-25 Mitchell and flew in 73 bombing missions in the China Burma India theater over 10 months. He sprained his ankle during the last of these operations when the aircraft went into a steep dive. In August 1945, it was reported that he had been discharged on the point system.

== Professional career ==
On August 11, 1945, it was reported that Petrella had signed with the Pittsburgh Steelers of the National Football League (NFL). He played in the first three games of the 1945 season and started one of them. He totaled 15 carries for 33 yards, three kick returns for 85 yards, 6 punt returns for 52 yards, and one interception on defense for eight yards. He was waived on October 17, 1945, after Art Jones returned from the Navy. Petrella then returned to Penn State to finish his degree.

Petrella was a player-coach for the Altoona Mountaineers of the Pennsylvania Pro Grid League from 1946 to 1947.

Petrella played in three games, starting one, for the Bethlehem Bulldogs of the American Football League in 1949, rushing 10 times for 81 yards and one touchdown while also scoring one receiving touchdown.

== Personal life ==
Petrella died on December 21, 1991, in Broward County, Florida.
