= Warren Kasch =

American sports coach, athletics administrator, educator (1903–1965)

Biographical details
- Born: July 26, 1903; Pecatonica, Illinois, U.S.
- Died: October 12, 1965 (aged 62); St. Cloud, Minnesota, U.S.

Playing career

Football
- c. 1925: Cornell (IA)

Basketball
- c. 1925: Cornell (IA)
- Position: Forward (basketball)

Coaching career (HC unless noted)

Football
- 1927–1929: Brainerd HS (MN)
- 1930–1934: Technical HS (MN)
- 1935–1942: St. Cloud State
- 1945: Madison Central HS (WI)

Basketball
- 1927–1930: Brainerd HS (MN)
- early 1930s: Technical HS (MN)
- 1935–1943: St. Cloud State
- 1943–1944: Cathedral HS (MN)
- 1944–1945: Madison Central HS (WI)
- 1946–1950: St. Cloud State

Baseball
- 1946: Madison Central HS (WI)

Track and field
- 1927–1930: Brainerd HS (MN)
- 1930–1935: Technical HS (MN)
- 1935–?: St. Cloud State

Administrative career (AD unless noted)
- 1930–1935: Technical HS (MN)

Head coaching record
- Overall: 36–18–3 (college football); 119–74 (college basketball)

Accomplishments and honors

Championships
- Football; 4 NTCC/MTCC (1936, 1940–1942)

Warren Ernest Kasch (July 26, 1903 – October 12, 1965) was an American football, basketball, baseball, and track and field coach, athletics administrator, and educator. He served as the head football coach at St. Cloud State Teachers College—now known as St. Cloud State University—in St. Cloud, Minnesota from 1935 to 1942, compiling a record of 36–18–3.

Kasch was born on July 26, 1903, in Pecatonica, Illinois. He attended Rockford High School in Rockford, Illinois, where he played football and basketball. Kasch then went to Cornell College in Mount Vernon, Iowa, lettering in football and basketball. He played as a forward in basketball, and was named team captain for the 1924–25 season.

Kasch began his coaching career in 1927 at Brainerd High School Brainerd, Minnesota. After three years at Brainerd, where he coached football, basketball, and track, he was appointed athletic director and head of the physical education department for the public school district in St. Cloud.

Kasch died on October 12, 1965, in St. Cloud.

== Head coaching record ==
=== College football ===
Year	Team	Overall	Conference	Standing	Bowl/playoffs
St. Cloud State Huskies (Northern Teachers College Conference / Minnesota Teachers College Conference) (1935–1942)
1935	St. Cloud State	2–5	2–3	4th	
1936	St. Cloud State	6–0–1	4–0	1st	
1937	St. Cloud State	6–2	3–1	2nd	
1938	St. Cloud State	2–4–1	2–3	4th	
1939	St. Cloud State	2–5–1	0–4–1	5th	
1940	St. Cloud State	5–2	4–0	1st	
1941	St. Cloud State	7–0	4–0	1st	
1942	St. Cloud State	6–0	4–0	T–1st	
St. Cloud State:		36–18–3	19–11–1		
Total:		36–18–3			
National championship Conference title Conference division title or championship game berth
