= 1941 Willamette Bearcats football team =

College football season

1946 Willamette Bearcats football

NWC champion
- Conference: Northwest Conference
- Record: 8–2 (5–0 NWC)
- Head coach: Spec Keene (16th season)
- Captain: Buddy Reynolds and ?
- Home stadium: Sweetland Field

1941 Northwest Conference football standings
	Conf.					Overall
Team	W		L		T	W		L		T
Willamette $	5	–	0	–	0	8	–	2	–	0
Whitman	4	–	1	–	0	5	–	1	–	0
Pacific (OR)	2	–	3	–	0	4	–	4	–	0
Puget Sound	2	–	3	–	0	2	–	6	–	0
College of Idaho	1	–	3	–	0	5	–	5	–	0
Linfield	0	–	4	–	0	1	–	6	–	1
$ – Conference champion

The 1941 Willamette Bearcats football team was an American football team that represented the Willamette University of Salem, Oregon, as a member of the Northwest Conference during the 1941 college football season. In their 16th season under head coach Spec Keene, the Bearcats compiled an 8–2 record (5–0 against NWC opponents), outscored five conference opponents by a total of 218 to 7, and won the conference championship. Dick Weisgerber, a Willamette alumnus who went on to play for the Green Bay Packers, returned to Willamette as an assistant coach in 1941.

Due to their playing in Honolulu on the day before the attack on Pearl Harbor, they became known as the "Pearl Harbor" team. Four members of the team (Keene, Weisgerber, Ted Ogdahl, and Marvin Goodman) were inducted individually into the Willamette University Athletic Hall of Fame. The team as a whole was inducted in 1997.

Willamette players received 11 of 13 first-team spots on the 1941 All-Northwest Conference football team. Four players were unanimous picks: end Bill Reder; tackle Martin Barstad; guard Tony Fraiola; and back Teddy Ogdahl.

Willamette was ranked at No. 99 (out of 681 teams) in the final rankings under the Litkenhous Difference by Score System for 1941.

The team played its home games at Sweetland Field in Salem, Oregon.

== Schedule ==
Date	Opponent	Site	Result	Attendance	Source
September 19	Portland Army Air Base	Sweetland Field; Salem, OR	W 19–0		
September 26	College of Idaho	Sweetland Field; Salem, OR	W 52–0		
October 2	at Portland	Multnomah Stadium; Portland, OR	W 26–0		
October 10	at Linfield	McMinnville, OR	W 43–0		
October 17	Whittier*	Sweetland Field; Salem, OR	W 33–7		
October 25	at Idaho*	Neale Stadium; Moscow, ID	L 6–33	1,200	
November 7	Puget Sound^{†}	Sweetland Field; Salem, OR	W 55–7		
November 11	Pacific (OR)	Sweetland Field; Salem, OR (Armistice Day)	W 40–0		
November 20	at Whitman	Walla Walla, WA	W 28–0		
December 6	at Hawaii*	Honolulu Stadium; Honolulu, Territory of Hawaii (Shrine Football Classic)	L 6–20	25,000	
*Non-conference game; ^{†}Homecoming

== Shrine Game and Pearl Harbor ==
On the afternoon of December 6, 1941, in the Shrine Football Classic, Willamette lost to Hawaii at Honolulu Stadium. The game drew a crowd of 25,000 persons, the largest paid attendance in Hawaii history to that point. The attendees included Territorial Governor Joseph Poindexter, Honolulu Mayor Lester Petrie, and Lt. Gen. Walter Short, the U.S. commander responsible for the defense of U.S. military installations in Hawaii; the game was preceded by a "spectacle" of marching bands, including performances by the U.S. Marine band and bands from several Hawaiian high schools and colleges.

Early the following morning, the team gathered for a planned sightseeing tour and picnic. The attack on Pearl Harbor interrupted the picnic plan and began the Pacific War. Willamette was also scheduled to play San Jose State on December 16 in Honolulu, but that game was cancelled. In the wake of the attack, it was unclear if a full-scale invasion had begun. Martial law was declared in Honolulu, and the visiting Willamette football players were assigned to support the emergency. They were given World War I rifles, bayonets and helmets, and served for the next 10 days as guards at the Punahou School which was converted into an ammunition depot.

The team returned home on the SS President Coolidge, attending to wounded sailors, finally arriving in San Francisco on Christmas Day.

In 2019, the experiences of the Willamette and San Jose State football teams were documented in the book, "Scrimmage for War: A Story of Pearl Harbor, Football, and World War II".

== Honors ==
The conference coaches selected an All-Northwest Conference football team at the end of the 1941 season. Willamette players received 11 of the 13 first-team spots. Willamette's first-team honorees were:

- Marshall Barbour, right end, age 20, 5'11", 190 pounds, Portland, Oregon
- Martin Barstad, left tackle, age 20, 6'1", 203 pounds, Woodburn, Oregon (unanimous pick)
- George Constable, right end, age 20, 6', 200 pounds, Gillespie, Illinois
- Anthony Jo "Tony" Fraiola, left guard, age 23, 5'9", 175 pounds, New Providence, New Jersey (unanimous pick, second consecutive year with all-conference honors)
- Gordon Moore, right guard, age 22, 6'2", 195 pounds, Tigard, Oregon
- Neil Morley, right tackle, age 19, 6'2", 210 pounds, Bingen, Washington
- Teddy Ogdahl, right halfback, age 19, 5'9", 172 pounds, Portland, Oregon (unanimous pick)
- Bill Reder, left end, age 20, 6'2", 190 pounds, Portland, Oregon (unanimous pick)
- Buddy Reynolds, left halfback, age 24, 5'7", 168 pounds, La Grande, Oregon
- Gene Stewart, left halfback, age 23, 5'10", 175 pounds, Ontario, Oregon
- Al Walden, fullback, age 21, 5'7", 175 pounds, San Diego (third consecutive year with all-conference honors)

In addition, two other Willamette players were named to the second team:

- Pat White, center, age 20, 6', 190 pounds, Portland, Oregon
- Chuck Furno, right halfback, age 20, 5'5", 165 pounds, Wisconsin Rapids
