= 1942 St. Cloud State Huskies football team =

American college football season

1942 St. Cloud State Huskies football
- St. Cloud's all-conference stars: Filippi, Shew, Bierhaus, Zakariasen

MTCC co-champion
- Conference: Minnesota Teachers College Conference
- Record: 6–0 (4–0 MTCC)
- Head coach: Warren Kasch (8th season)
- Captains: Louis Filippi; Harvey Shew

1942 Minnesota Teachers College Conference football standings
	Conf.					Overall
Team	W		L		T	W		L		T
St. Cloud State +	4	–	0	–	0	6	–	0	–	0
Mankato State +	4	–	0	–	0	4	–	2	–	0
Bemidji State	2	–	2	–	0	3	–	4	–	0
Duluth State	2	–	2	–	0	2	–	3	–	1
Winona State	0	–	4	–	0	2	–	4	–	1
Moorhead State	0	–	4	–	0	2	–	5	–	0
+ – Conference co-champions

The 1942 St. Cloud State Huskies football team was an American football team that represented St. Cloud State Teachers College (later renamed St. Cloud State University) as a member of the Minnesota Teachers College Conference (MTCC) during the 1942 college football season. In their eighth and final year under head coach Warren Kasch, the Huskies compiled a perfect 6–0 record (4–0 in NTCC games), shared the MTCC championship with Mankato State, shut out five of six opponents, and outscored all opponents by a total of 152 to 7. It was St. Cloud's second consecutive perfect season, extending its winning streak to 14 games.

Four St. Cloud players received first-team honors on the all-conference team: back Louis Filippi; back Fritz Bierhaus; tackle Ken Zackariasen; and guard Harvey Shew. Filippi and Shew were St. Cloud's team captains. End Wilbur Kessler and center Donald Renn were named to the second team.

== Schedule ==
Date	Opponent	Site	Result	Source
October 3	Winona State		W 27–0	
October 10	at Duluth State	Duluth, MN	W 25–7	
October 17	Bemidji State		W 14–0	
October 24	at Moorhead State	Moorhead, MN	W 39–0	
October 30	Minnesota freshmen*	Northrup Field; Minneapolis, MN	W 6–0	
November 7	Eau Claire*	Saint Coud, MN	W 41–0	
*Non-conference game

== Game summaries ==
=== Moorhead State ===
On October 24, St. Cloud concluded its conference schedule with a 39–0 victory over Moorhead State at Moorhead, Minnesota. St. Cloud's left halfback and co-captain Louis Filippi scored three rushing touchdowns and passed for two more, sealing the conference scoring title with 47 points in four conference games. Fritz Bierhaus, who was known as a 60-minute player handling quarterback duties on both offense and defense, also scored on a 10-yard touchdown pass from Filippi. Filippi also threw a touchdown pass to Kessler. St. Cloud tied with Mankato State for the conference champion. St. Cloud and Mankato did not play each other, though Mankato was able to score only six points against Moorhead.

=== Minnesota freshmen ===
On October 30, St Cloud defeated the Minnesota Golden Gophers freshmen by a 6–0 score before a large crowd at Northrup Field in Minneapolis. Despite being "a marked man", St. Cloud's star left halfback Louis Filippi carried the ball 37 times for 126 yards, accounted for more than 75% of St. Cloud's 200 yards of total offense, and scored the game's only points. The touchdown was scored on a double lateral from Hambrech to Bierhaus to Filippi.

=== Eau Claire ===
On November 7, St. Cloud State concluded its season with a 41–0 non-conference victory over Eau Claire in Saint Cloud. Left halfback Louis Filippi scored three touchddowns and had long runs of 51 and 57 yards. Quarterback Bierhaus intercepted an Eau Claire pass at the goal ine and returned it 100 yards for a touchdown in the second quarter. It was St. Cloud's biggest margin of victory of the year. It also extended St. Cloud's winning streak to 14 games.
