= 1941 Montana State Bobcats football team =

American college football season

1941 Montana State Bobcats football
- Conference: Rocky Mountain Conference
- Record: 1–4–2 (1–2–1 RMC)
- Head coach: Schubert R. Dyche (12th season)
- Home stadium: Gatton Field

1941 Rocky Mountain Conference football standings
	Conf.					Overall
Team	W		L		T	W		L		T
Colorado College $	4	–	0	–	0	6	–	2	–	0
Colorado State–Greeley	3	–	1	–	0	3	–	5	–	0
Colorado Mines	1	–	2	–	1	2	–	4	–	2
Montana State	1	–	2	–	1	1	–	4	–	2
Western State (CO)	0	–	4	–	0	0	–	7	–	0
$ – Conference champion

The 1941 Montana State Bobcats football team was an American football team that represented Montana State College (later renamed Montana State University) in the Rocky Mountain Conference (RMC) during the 1941 college football season. In its 12th and final season under head coach Schubert R. Dyche, the team compiled a 1–4–2 record (1–2–1 against RMC opponents). Brick Breeden was assistant coach. Carl Fjeld was the frosh coach.

== Schedule ==
Date	Opponent	Site	Result	Attendance	Source
September 27	Western State (CO)	Gatton Field; Bozeman, MT	W 19–0		
October 4	Colorado Mines^{†}	Gatton Field; Bozeman, MT	T 0–0		
October 11	at Colorado College	Washburn Field; Colorado Springs, CO	L 7–28		
October 17	at Colorado State–Greeley	Jackson Field; Greeley, CO	L 6–7		
October 25	Montana	Butte High Stadium; Butte, MT (rivalry)	L 13–23	> 6,000	
November 11	at Idaho Southern Branch*	Spud Bowl; Pocatello, ID	T 13–13		
November 22	at Idaho	Public School Field; Boise, ID	L 0–39	5,000	
*Non-conference game; ^{†}Homecoming
