= 1941 Chico State Wildcats football team =

American college football season

1941 Chico State Wildcats football
- Conference: Far Western Conference
- Record: 1–5–2 (1–2 FWC)
- Head coach: Roy Bohler (3rd season)
- Home stadium: College Field

1941 Far Western Conference football standings
| | Conf. | | | | | Overall |
| Team | W | | L | | T | W | | L | | T |
|---|---|---|---|---|---|---|---|---|---|---|
| Pacific (CA) $ | 3 | – | 0 | – | 0 | 4 | – | 7 | – | 0 |
| Cal Aggies | 2 | – | 1 | – | 0 | 2 | – | 2 | – | 4 |
| Chico State | 1 | – | 2 | – | 0 | 1 | – | 5 | – | 2 |
| Humboldt State | 0 | – | 3 | – | 0 | 2 | – | 5 | – | 1 |
$ – Conference champion

The 1941 Chico State Wildcats football team represented Chico State College—now known as California State University, Chico—as a member of the Far Western Conference (FWC) during the 1941 college football season. Led by third-year head coach Roy Bohler, Chico State compiled an overall record of 1–5–2 with a mark of 1–2 in conference play, placing third in the FWC. The team was outscored by its opponents 87 to 41 for the season. The Wildcats played home games at College Field in Chico, California.

== Schedule ==
| Date | Opponent | Site | Result | Source |
|---|---|---|---|---|
| September 26 | Moffett Field (Note: Naval Air Station Moffett Field was a Naval Air Station from 1933 to 1994.)* | College Field; Chico, CA | L 0–28 | |
| October 3 | at Pacific (CA) | Baxter Stadium; Stockton, CA | L 0–6 | |
| October 11 | Cal Poly*^{†} | College Field; Chico, CA | T 0–0 | |
| October 18 | at Humboldt State | Albee Stadium; Eureka, CA | W 13–6 | |
| October 25 | at Cal Aggies | A Street field; Davis, CA | L 0–7 | |
| October 31 | California JV (Note: The University of California JV team was commonly known as the "Cal Ramblers".)* | College Field; Chico, CA | L 7–14 | |
| November 7 | at San Francisco State* | Roberts Field; San Francisco, CA | L 7–12 | |
| November 14 | Sacramento* | College Field; Chico, CA | T 14–14 | |
*Non-conference game; ^{†}Homecoming
