= 1941 college football season =

American college football season

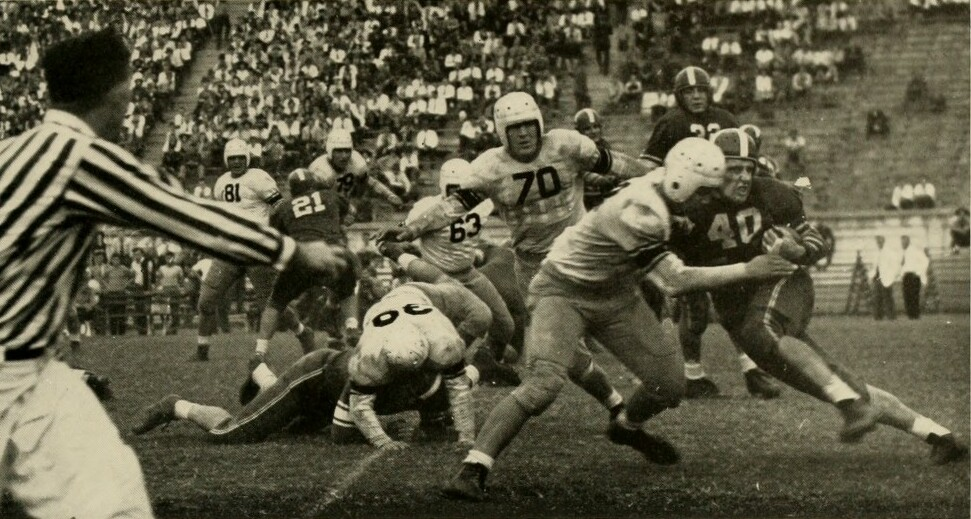
- Duke v Colgate game
- First AP No. 1 of season: Minnesota
- Number of bowls: 5
- Champion(s): Minnesota (Note: per AP poll, Boand System, Dunkel System, Helms Athletic Foundation, Litkenhous Ratings, Poling System, Billingsley Report, College Football Researchers Association, DeVold System, National Championship Foundation, Sagarin Ratings Elo chess method, Sagarin Ratings Predictor method); Alabama (Note: per Houlgate System); Texas (Note: per Williamson System and Berryman QPRS) (not claimed)
- Heisman: Bruce Smith (halfback, Minnesota)

The 1941 college football regular season was the 73rd season of intercollegiate football in the United States. Competition included schools from the Big Ten Conference, the Pacific Coast Conference (PCC), the Southeastern Conference (SEC), the Big Six Conference, the Southern Conference, the Southwestern Conference, and numerous smaller conferences and independent programs.

The teams ranked highest in the final Associated Press poll in December 1941 were:

1. Minnesota, under head coach Bernie Bierman, compiled a perfect 8–0 record, won the Big Ten championship, and was ranked No. 1. It was Minnesota's fifth national championship in eight years.
2. Duke compiled a 9–0 record in the regular season, won the Southern Conference championship, and was ranked No. 2.
3. Notre Dame, led by head coach Frank Leahy, compiled an 8–0–1 record and was ranked No. 3.
4. Texas, led by head coach Dana X. Bible, compiled an 8–1–1 record and was ranked No. 4. Texas was named by one contemporary major selector, the math-based Williamson System, as its No. 1 team.
5. Michigan, led by head coach Fritz Crisler, compiled a 6–1–1 record and was ranked No. 5.

Minnesota halfback Bruce Smith won the 1941 Heisman Trophy, and Virginia halfback Bill Dudley won the 1941 Maxwell Award. The season's statistical leaders included Frank Sinkwich of Georgia with 1,103 rushing yards, Bud Schwenk of Washington University in St. Louis with 1,457 passing yards, Hank Stanton of Arizona with 820 receiving yards, and Bill Dudley with 134 points scored.

In the four major bowl games, No. 2 Duke lost to PCC champion Oregon State in the Rose Bowl, No. 6 Fordham defeated No. 7 Missouri in the Sugar Bowl, No. 14 Georgia defeated unranked TCU in the Orange Bowl, and No. 20 Alabama defeated No. 9 Texas A&M Aggies in the Cotton Bowl. The Rose Bowl was moved from Pasadena, California, to Durham, North Carolina, due to security concerns on the West Coast following the December 7 attack on Pearl Harbor.

== Conference and program changes ==
=== Conference changes ===
- One conference played its final season in 1941:
  - Michigan-Ontario Collegiate Conference – conference active since the 1930 season

School	1940 Conference	1941 Conference
Hardin–Simmons Cowboys	Independent	Border
Long Island Blackbirds	Independent	Dropped Program
Sewanee Tigers	SEC	Independent
Washburn Ichabods	Missouri Valley	Independent
West Texas State Buffaloes	Alamo	Border
William & Mary Norfolk Division Braves	Independent	Dropped Program

== September ==
September 20 Tennessee beat Furman 32–6 and Boston College beat St. Anselm, 78–0.

September 27 In Seattle, defending champion Minnesota beat Washington 14–6, while in New Orleans, Boston College fell to Tulane, 21–7. Stanford beat Oregon 19–15, Michigan beat Michigan State 19–7, Texas won at Colorado, 34–6 and Duke beat Wake Forest 43–14. Tennessee was idle

== October ==
October 4 Minnesota was idle. Tennessee lost at Duke, 19–0. In New York, Fordham beat SMU 16–10. Elsewhere, it was Stanford over UCLA 33–0, Michigan over Iowa 6–0, Northwestern beating Kansas State 51–3 and Texas defeating LSU 34–0.

October 11 Minnesota beat Illinois 34–6, Northwestern beat Wisconsin 41–14, and Michigan beat Pittsburgh 40–0. In Baltimore, Duke beat Maryland 50–0, while in Dallas, Texas beat Oklahoma 40–7. Fordham won at North Carolina 27–14. Stanford lost at Oregon State 10–0. In the poll that followed, Minnesota was ranked No. 1, followed by Texas, Duke, Fordham, and Northwestern.

On October 16, the penalty flag was used for the first time in the 1941 Oklahoma City vs. Youngstown football game in Youngstown, Ohio.

October 18 No. 1 Minnesota beat Pittsburgh 39–0. No. 2 Texas defeated Arkansas 48–14. No. 3 Duke beat visiting Colgate 27–14. In Ann Arbor, No. 6 Michigan beat visiting No. 5 Northwestern 14–7. No. 7 Navy beat Cornell 14–0 in Baltimore. The next poll featured No. 1 Minnesota, No. 2 Texas, No. 3 Michigan, No. 4 Duke, and No. 5 Navy. Fordham dropped from No. 4 to No. 6 despite a 27–0 defeat of West Virginia.

October 25 The biggest game of the year took place in Ann Arbor, Michigan, as No. 1 Minnesota defeated No. 3 Michigan, 7–0. No. 2 Texas beat Rice 40–0. No. 4 Duke won at Pittsburgh 27–7. No. 5 Navy and Harvard played to a 0–0 tie. No. 6 Fordham beat TCU 28–14, while No. 9 Texas A&M won at Baylor 48–0, to reach 5–0–0. In the vote that followed, Minnesota received 60 first place votes, and Texas received 53. When the points were tallied, they both had 1,161 points and were tied for No. 1. Fordham, Duke, and Texas A&M rounded out the top five.

== November ==
November 1 In Dallas, No. 1 Texas beat No. 20 SMU 34–0, while in Minneapolis, the other No. 1, Minnesota, edged No. 9 Northwestern 8–7. In New York, No. 3 Fordham defeated Purdue 17–0, and in Atlanta, No. 4 Duke won at Georgia Tech 14–0. In Little Rock, No. 5 Texas A&M beat Arkansas 7–0. Texas was alone at No. 1 the following week, followed by Minnesota, Fordham, Duke and Texas A&M, all unbeaten and untied.

November 8 No. 1 Texas and Baylor played to a 7–7 tie. No. 2 Minnesota beat Nebraska 9–0. No. 3 Fordham lost at Pittsburgh 13–0. No. 4 Duke won at Davidson 56–0. No. 5 Texas A&M beat SMU 21–10. No. 7 Notre Dame beat No. 6 Navy 20–13 in Baltimore and moved into fifth place behind Minnesota, Texas, Duke, and Texas A&M.

November 15 No. 1 Minnesota won at Iowa 34–13. No. 2 Texas lost to Texas Christian (TCU) 14–7. No. 3 Duke beat North Carolina 20–0. In Houston, No. 4 Texas A&M beat Rice 19–6. No. 5 Notre Dame won at No. 8 Northwestern 7–6. No. 7 Michigan, which beat Columbia 28–0, moved up to No. 5 behind Minnesota, Texas A&M, Duke, and Notre Dame.

November 22 No. 1 Minnesota closed its season with a 41–6 win over Wisconsin in Minneapolis. No. 2 Texas A&M was idle as it prepared for its Thanksgiving game. No. 3 Duke won its season closer at N.C. State 55–6 to get a bid to Pasadena’s Rose Bowl. No. 4 Notre Dame beat USC 20–18. No. 5 Michigan closed its season with a 20–20 tie against No. 14 Ohio State. The top four remained the same, but No. 6 Duquesne (which had finished its season at 8–0–0) replaced Michigan at No. 5.

On Thanksgiving Day No. 2 Texas A&M lost to No. 10 Texas 23–0. The top five in the final AP Poll were No. 1 Minnesota, No. 2 Duke, No. 3 Notre Dame, No. 4 Texas, and No. 5 Michigan.

December 2 the Houlgate System published its "final selections" ranking Minnesota first, Navy second, and Alabama No. 3.

The bombing of Pearl Harbor on December 7 called into question whether Southern California would be safe from a Japanese attack on New Year's Day. On December 15, bowl officials and U.S. Army officers met in San Francisco and decided to hold the game at Duke's stadium in Durham, North Carolina.

== Conference standings ==
=== Major conference standings ===
1941 Big Six Conference football standings
	Conf.					Overall
Team	W		L		T	W		L		T
No. 7 Missouri $	5	–	0	–	0	8	–	2	–	0
Nebraska	3	–	2	–	0	4	–	5	–	0
Oklahoma	3	–	2	–	0	6	–	3	–	0
Kansas	2	–	3	–	0	3	–	6	–	0
Kansas State	1	–	3	–	1	2	–	5	–	2
Iowa State	0	–	4	–	1	2	–	6	–	1
$ – Conference champion; Rankings from AP Poll

1941 Big Ten Conference football standings
	Conf.					Overall
Team	W		L		T	W		L		T
No. 1 Minnesota $	5	–	0	–	0	8	–	0	–	0
No. 5 Michigan	3	–	1	–	1	6	–	1	–	1
No. 13 Ohio State	3	–	1	–	1	6	–	1	–	1
No. 11 Northwestern	4	–	2	–	0	5	–	3	–	0
Wisconsin	3	–	3	–	0	3	–	5	–	0
Iowa	2	–	4	–	0	3	–	5	–	0
Purdue	1	–	3	–	0	2	–	5	–	1
Indiana	1	–	3	–	0	2	–	6	–	0
Illinois	0	–	5	–	0	2	–	6	–	0
$ – Conference champion; Rankings from AP Poll

1941 Border Conference football standings
	Conf.					Overall
Team	W		L		T	W		L		T
Arizona $	5	–	0	–	0	7	–	3	–	0
Texas Tech	2	–	0	–	0	9	–	2	–	0
West Texas State	4	–	1	–	0	8	–	2	–	0
Hardin–Simmons	3	–	1	–	0	7	–	3	–	1
New Mexico	3	–	2	–	1	5	–	4	–	1
Texas Mines	3	–	4	–	0	4	–	5	–	1
Arizona State	2	–	4	–	1	5	–	1	–	1
Arizona State–Flagstaff	1	–	5	–	0	3	–	5	–	0
New Mexico A&M	0	–	6	–	0	2	–	7	–	0
$ – Conference champion

1941 Mountain States Conference football standings
	Conf.					Overall
Team	W		L		T	W		L		T
Utah $	4	–	0	–	2	6	–	0	–	2
BYU	3	–	1	–	2	4	–	3	–	2
Denver	3	–	1	–	2	4	–	3	–	2
Colorado A&M	3	–	2	–	1	4	–	2	–	1
Colorado	3	–	2	–	1	3	–	4	–	1
Wyoming	1	–	5	–	0	2	–	7	–	1
Utah State	0	–	6	–	0	0	–	8	–	0
$ – Conference champion

1941 Pacific Coast Conference football standings
	Conf.					Overall
Team	W		L		T	W		L		T
No. 12 Oregon State $	7	–	2	–	0	8	–	2	–	0
Washington	5	–	3	–	0	5	–	4	–	0
No. 19 Washington State	5	–	3	–	0	6	–	4	–	0
Stanford	4	–	3	–	0	6	–	3	–	0
Oregon	4	–	4	–	0	5	–	5	–	0
UCLA	3	–	4	–	1	5	–	5	–	1
California	3	–	4	–	0	4	–	5	–	0
USC	2	–	4	–	1	2	–	6	–	1
Montana	1	–	3	–	0	6	–	3	–	0
Idaho	0	–	4	–	0	4	–	5	–	0
$ – Conference champion; Rankings from AP Poll

1941 Southeastern Conference football standings
	Conf.					Overall
Team		W		L			W		L
No. 16 Mississippi State $	4	–	0	–	1	8	–	1	–	1
No. 18 Tennessee	3	–	1	–	0	8	–	2	–	0
No. 20 Alabama	5	–	2	–	0	9	–	2	–	0
No. 14 Georgia	3	–	1	–	1	9	–	1	–	1
No. 17 Ole Miss	2	–	1	–	1	6	–	2	–	1
Vanderbilt	3	–	2	–	0	8	–	2	–	0
LSU	2	–	2	–	2	4	–	4	–	2
Tulane	2	–	3	–	0	5	–	4	–	0
Georgia Tech	2	–	4	–	0	3	–	6	–	0
Florida	1	–	3	–	0	4	–	6	–	0
Kentucky	0	–	4	–	0	5	–	4	–	0
Auburn	0	–	4	–	1	4	–	5	–	1
$ – Conference champion; Rankings from AP Poll

1941 Southern Conference football standings
	Conf.					Overall
Team	W		L		T	W		L		T
No. 2 Duke +	5	–	0	–	0	9	–	1	–	0
South Carolina +	4	–	0	–	1	4	–	4	–	1
Clemson	5	–	1	–	0	7	–	2	–	0
William & Mary	4	–	1	–	0	8	–	2	–	0
VMI	4	–	2	–	0	4	–	6	–	0
VPI	4	–	2	–	0	6	–	4	–	0
Wake Forest	4	–	2	–	1	5	–	5	–	1
NC State	3	–	4	–	2	4	–	5	–	2
Furman	2	–	3	–	2	3	–	4	–	2
Washington and Lee	1	–	2	–	2	1	–	6	–	2
North Carolina	2	–	4	–	0	3	–	7	–	0
Maryland	1	–	2	–	0	3	–	5	–	1
Davidson	1	–	5	–	2	1	–	6	–	3
The Citadel	0	–	2	–	1	4	–	3	–	1
George Washington	0	–	4	–	1	1	–	7	–	1
Richmond	0	–	6	–	0	2	–	7	–	0
+ – Conference co-champions; Rankings from AP Poll

1941 Southwest Conference football standings
	Conf.					Overall
Team	W		L		T	W		L		T
No. 9 Texas A&M $	5	–	1	–	0	9	–	2	–	0
No. 4 Texas	4	–	1	–	1	8	–	1	–	1
TCU	4	–	1	–	1	7	–	3	–	1
Rice	3	–	2	–	1	6	–	3	–	1
SMU	2	–	4	–	0	5	–	5	–	0
Baylor	1	–	4	–	1	3	–	6	–	1
Arkansas	0	–	6	–	0	3	–	7	–	0
$ – Conference champion; Rankings from AP Poll

=== Independents ===
1941 Eastern college football independents records
	Conf.			Overall
Team	W	L	T	W		L		T
No. 8 Duquesne		–		8	–	0	–	0
Thiel		–		7	–	0	–	0
Saint Francis (PA)		–		6	–	0	–	1
No. 6 Fordham		–		8	–	1	–	0
Rochester		–		6	–	1	–	0
Trinity (CT)		–		6	–	1	–	0
Wagner		–		5	–	1	–	0
Franklin & Marshall		–		5	–	1	–	1
Penn State		–		7	–	2	–	0
Temple		–		7	–	2	–	0
Coast Guard		–		6	–	2	–	0
Norwich		–		6	–	2	–	0
Hofstra		–		5	–	2	–	0
Boston College		–		7	–	3	–	0
Syracuse		–		5	–	2	–	1
Bucknell		–		6	–	3	–	0
Drexel		–		4	–	2	–	1
Boston University		–		5	–	3	–	0
La Salle		–		5	–	3	–	0
Tufts		–		5	–	3	–	0
Army		–		5	–	3	–	1
CCNY		–		4	–	4	–	0
Villanova		–		4	–	4	–	0
Manhattan		–		4	–	4	–	1
Holy Cross		–		4	–	4	–	2
Colgate		–		3	–	3	–	2
Providence		–		3	–	3	–	2
Buffalo		–		3	–	4	–	1
Massachusetts State		–		3	–	4	–	1
Pittsburgh		–		3	–	6	–	0
Vermont		–		2	–	6	–	0
NYU		–		2	–	7	–	0
Carnegie Tech		–		1	–	7	–	0
Rankings from AP Poll

1941 Midwestern college football independents records
	Conf.			Overall
Team	W	L	T	W		L		T
Western Michigan		–		8	–	0	–	0
No. 3 Notre Dame		–		8	–	0	–	1
Youngstown		–		7	–	0	–	1
Xavier		–		9	–	1	–	0
Detroit		–		7	–	2	–	0
Ohio		–		5	–	2	–	1
Dayton		–		7	–	3	–	0
Cincinnati		–		6	–	3	–	0
Akron		–		5	–	3	–	1
Michigan State		–		5	–	3	–	1
Central Michigan		–		4	–	3	–	0
Ohio Wesleyan		–		5	–	4	–	0
Michigan Tech		–		3	–	3	–	0
Marquette		–		4	–	5	–	0
Carthage		–		1	–	5	–	2
Wayne		–		2	–	6	–	0
Miami (OH)		–		2	–	7	–	0
Western Ontario		–		1	–	4	–	0
Wichita		–		1	–	6	–	1
Michigan State Normal		–		0	–	5	–	2
Detroit Tech		–		0	–	7	–	1
Rankings from AP Poll

1941 Southern college football independents records
	Conf.			Overall
Team	W	L	T	W		L		T
East Carolina		–		7	–	0	–	0
Delaware		–		7	–	0	–	1
Virginia		–		8	–	1	–	0
Marshall		–		7	–	1	–	0
No. 10 Navy		–		7	–	1	–	1
Georgetown		–		5	–	4	–	0
Western Maryland		–		3	–	4	–	1
West Virginia		–		4	–	6	–	0
Roanoke		–		3	–	5	–	0
Sewanee		–		2	–	5	–	0
Delaware State		–		1	–	4	–	0
Georgia Teachers		–		2	–	8	–	0
Rankings from AP Poll

1941 Western college football independents records
	Conf.			Overall
Team	W	L	T	W		L		T
Hawaii		–		8	–	1	–	0
Santa Clara		–		6	–	3	–	0
San Francisco		–		6	–	4	–	0
Idaho Southern Branch		–		5	–	1	–	2
Cal Poly		–		5	–	3	–	1
Saint Mary's		–		5	–	4	–	0
Loyola (CA)		–		5	–	5	–	0
Nevada		–		3	–	5	–	1
Portland		–		3	–	5	–	0
Gonzaga		–		3	–	7	–	0
San Francisco State		–		2	–	4	–	1
Humboldt State		–		2	–	5	–	1
La Verne		–		0	–	6	–	0

=== Minor conferences ===
Conference	Champion(s)	Record
California Collegiate Athletic Association	Fresno State; San Jose State	2–0–1
Central Intercollegiate Athletics Association	Morgan State College	6–1
Central Intercollegiate Athletic Conference	Pittsburg State	3–1
Far Western Conference	Pacific (CA)	3–0
Iowa Intercollegiate Athletic Conference	Luther	4–0–1
Kansas Collegiate Athletic Conference	Baker	5–1
Lone Star Conference	North Texas State Teachers	4–0
Michigan Intercollegiate Athletic Association	Alma	4–0–1
Michigan-Ontario Collegiate Conference	Lawrence Technological University	3–0
Midwest Collegiate Athletic Conference	Ripon	5–0–1
Minnesota Intercollegiate Athletic Conference	Saint Thomas (MN)	5–0
Missouri Intercollegiate Athletic Association	Missouri School of Mines; Northwest Missouri State Teachers	3–1–1
Nebraska College Athletic Conference	Midland Lutheran	4–0
Nebraska Intercollegiate Athletic Association	Nebraska State Teachers (UN–Kearney)	3–0
New Mexico Intercollegiate Conference	New Mexico Military Institute	4–0
North Central Intercollegiate Athletic Conference	Iowa State Teachers (Northern Iowa)	5–0
North Dakota College Athletic Conference	Jamestown College	5–0
Northern Teachers Athletic Conference	St. Cloud State Teachers	4–0
Ohio Athletic Conference	Case	4–0
Oklahoma Collegiate Athletic Conference	Central State College (OK)	6–0
Pennsylvania State Athletic Conference	Millersville State Teachers; West Chester State Teachers	3–0
Pacific Northwest Conference	Willamette	5–0
Rocky Mountain Athletic Conference	Colorado College	4–0
South Dakota Intercollegiate Conference	Augustana (SD); Northern State Teachers	3–0; 4–0
Southern California Intercollegiate Athletic Conference	Whittier	3–0–1
Southern Intercollegiate Athletic Conference	Morris Brown	5–0
Texas Collegiate Athletic Conference	Howard Payne	6–0
Washington Intercollegiate Conference	Pacific Lutheran	4–0–1
Southwestern Athletic Conference	No champion	—
Wisconsin State Teachers College Conference	Co-North: La Crosse Teachers; Co-North: Stout State Teachers; Co-South: Milwaukee State Teachers; Co-South: Platteville State Teachers	3–1–0; 3–1–0; 3–0–1; 3–0–1

=== Minor conference standings ===
1941 Alamo Conference football standings
	Conf.					Overall
Team	W		L		T	W		L		T
Texas A&I $	1	–	0	–	0	8	–	2	–	0
St. Mary's (TX)	0	–	1	–	0	7	–	4	–	1
$ – Conference champion

1941 California Collegiate Athletic Association football standings
	Conf.					Overall
Team	W		L		T	W		L		T
San Jose State +	2	–	0	–	1	5	–	3	–	3
Fresno State +	2	–	0	–	1	4	–	3	–	2
Santa Barbara State	1	–	2	–	0	3	–	5	–	1
San Diego State	0	–	3	–	0	6	–	4	–	0
+ – Conference co-champions

1941 Central Intercollegiate Conference football standings
	Conf.					Overall
Team	W		L		T	W		L		T
Pittsburg State $	3	–	1	–	0	5	–	2	–	3
St. Benedict's	2	–	1	–	1	5	–	2	–	1
Emporia State	2	–	1	–	1	4	–	3	–	2
Southwestern (KS)	2	–	2	–	0	9	–	3	–	1
Fort Hays State	0	–	4	–	0	1	–	6	–	2
$ – Conference champion

1941 Colored Intercollegiate Athletic Association football standings
	Conf.					Overall
Team	W		L		T	W		L		T
Morgan State $	6	–	1	–	0	6	–	1	–	0
Johnson C. Smith	4	–	1	–	1	7	–	1	–	2
Virginia State	4	–	2	–	1	4	–	2	–	2
Bluefield State	4	–	3	–	0	5	–	3	–	0
Hampton	6	–	2	–	0	6	–	2	–	0
Shaw	5	–	2	–	1	5	–	2	–	1
Virginia Union	2	–	4	–	0	4	–	4	–	0
North Carolina College	1	–	5	–	1	2	–	6	–	1
North Carolina A&T	2	–	5	–	0	3	–	6	–	0
Saint Paul's (VA)	1	–	7	–	0	1	–	7	–	0
St. Augustine's *	1	–	1	–	0	2	–	3	–	1
Lincoln (PA) *	2	–	3	–	0	4	–	3	–	0
Howard *	1	–	3	–	0	3	–	3	–	0
$ – Conference champion; * – Did not play a sufficient number of conference games to qualify for the championship. Conference standings were based on the Dickinson System. North Carolina College forfeited five conference wins, over Johnson C. Smith, Bluefield State, Shaw, Saint Paul's, and Lincoln, due to an ineligible player.

1941 Dixie Conference football standings
	Conf.					Overall
Team	W		L		T	W		L		T
Chattanooga $	4	–	0	–	1	7	–	1	–	1
Howard (AL)	2	–	0	–	1	4	–	5	–	1
Mississippi College	3	–	1	–	0	5	–	3	–	0
Millsaps	1	–	1	–	0	4	–	5	–	0
Southwestern (TN)	0	–	1	–	0	4	–	4	–	1
Mercer	0	–	3	–	0	3	–	6	–	0
Spring Hill	0	–	4	–	0	2	–	6	–	0
$ – Conference champion

1941 Eastern Intercollegiate Athletic Conference football standings
	Conf.					Overall
Team	W		L		T	W		L		T
Norfolk State $	3	–	0	–	1	6	–	0	–	1
Winston-Salem	2	–	0	–	2	5	–	0	–	3
Miner Teachers	2	–	2	–	0	2	–	3	–	0
Fayetteville State	2	–	3	–	0	2	–	6	–	0
Elizabeth City State	1	–	2	–	1	4	–	2	–	1
Swift	0	–	3	–	0	0	–	6	–	0
$ – Conference champion

1941 Far Western Conference football standings
	Conf.					Overall
Team	W		L		T	W		L		T
Pacific (CA) $	3	–	0	–	0	4	–	7	–	0
Cal Aggies	2	–	1	–	0	2	–	2	–	4
Chico State	1	–	2	–	0	1	–	5	–	2
Humboldt State	0	–	3	–	0	2	–	5	–	1
$ – Conference champion

1941 Illinois College Conference football standings
	Conf.					Overall
Team	W		L		T	W		L		T
Millikin $	6	–	0	–	0	8	–	0	–	0
Bradley Tech *	1	–	0	–	0	8	–	1	–	0
North Central (IL)	3	–	1	–	1	5	–	1	–	1
Lake Forest	2	–	1	–	1	5	–	1	–	2
Monmouth (IL)	2	–	1	–	0	5	–	2	–	1
Knox (IL)	1	–	2	–	0	3	–	4	–	1
Augustana (IL)	1	–	4	–	0	2	–	6	–	0
Wheaton (IL)	0	–	2	–	1	3	–	5	–	2
Illinois Wesleyan	0	–	2	–	1	2	–	5	–	2
Illinois College	0	–	3	–	2	3	–	4	–	2
$ – Conference champion; * ineligible for league title

1941 Illinois Intercollegiate Athletic Conference football standings
	Conf.					Overall
Team	W		L		T	W		L		T
Northern Illinois State +	3	–	1	–	0	7	–	1	–	1
Illinois State Normal +	3	–	1	–	0	3	–	4	–	2
Southern Illinois	2	–	1	–	1	5	–	2	–	1
Western Illinois	1	–	2	–	1	3	–	4	–	1
Eastern Illinois	0	–	4	–	0	0	–	7	–	0
Eureka	0	–	0	–	0	3	–	3	–	1
+ – Conference co-champions

1941 Indiana Intercollegiate Conference football standings
	Conf.					Overall
Team	W		L		T	W		L		T
Rose Poly +	4	–	0	–	0	7	–	0	–	0
Saint Joseph's (IN) +	3	–	0	–	0	8	–	0	–	1
Ball State	3	–	1	–	1	3	–	2	–	2
Butler	3	–	1	–	0	5	–	4	–	0
Wabash	4	–	2	–	0	5	–	3	–	1
DePauw	3	–	2	–	0	6	–	2	–	0
Indiana State	2	–	1	–	1	5	–	2	–	1
Evansville	2	–	1	–	1	3	–	5	–	1
Manchester	2	–	1	–	1	2	–	2	–	2
Franklin (IN)	2	–	4	–	1	2	–	5	–	1
Hanover	1	–	3	–	0	1	–	7	–	0
Central Normal	1	–	4	–	0	2	–	5	–	0
Earlham	0	–	5	–	0	2	–	5	–	0
Valparaiso	0	–	5	–	0	0	–	8	–	0
+ – Conference co-champions

1941 Iowa Conference football standings
	Conf.					Overall
Team	W		L		T	W		L		T
St. Ambrose *	2	–	0	–	0	6	–	2	–	0
Luther $	4	–	0	–	1	6	–	1	–	1
Dubuque	6	–	1	–	1	6	–	1	–	1
Central (IA)	6	–	2	–	0	6	–	3	–	0
Parsons	4	–	3	–	0	5	–	4	–	0
Iowa Wesleyan	3	–	3	–	0	3	–	5	–	0
Upper Iowa	3	–	3	–	0	3	–	5	–	0
Loras	2	–	3	–	0	3	–	6	–	0
Western Union	1	–	2	–	1	3	–	4	–	1
Simpson (IA)	2	–	4	–	0	3	–	5	–	1
Wartburg	1	–	4	–	0	2	–	5	–	0
Penn (IA)	1	–	6	–	0	1	–	6	–	0
Buena Vista	0	–	4	–	1	0	–	7	–	1
$ – Conference champion; * – did not play enough conference games to be eligible for title

1941 Kansas Collegiate Athletic Conference football standings
	Conf.					Overall
Team	W		L		T	W		L		T
Baker $	5	–	1	–	0	7	–	2	–	0
Bethel (KS)	4	–	1	–	1	6	–	1	–	1
Ottawa	4	–	1	–	1	6	–	1	–	1
Kansas Wesleyan	4	–	2	–	0	4	–	3	–	0
Bethany (KS)	1	–	5	–	0	1	–	7	–	0
College of Emporia	1	–	5	–	0	1	–	8	–	0
McPherson	1	–	5	–	0	1	–	8	–	0
$ – Conference champion

1941 Lone Star Conference football standings
	Conf.					Overall
Team	W		L		T	W		L		T
North Texas State $	4	–	0	–	0	7	–	1	–	0
Southwest Texas State	3	–	1	–	0	4	–	4	–	0
East Texas State	2	–	2	–	0	6	–	2	–	1
Sam Houston State	1	–	3	–	0	2	–	7	–	1
Stephen F. Austin	0	–	4	–	0	1	–	6	–	1
$ – Conference champion

1941 Louisiana Intercollegiate Conference football standings
	Conf.					Overall
Team	W		L		T	W		L		T
Louisiana Tech $	5	–	0	–	0	5	–	4	–	1
Southwestern Louisiana	3	–	1	–	0	6	–	2	–	1
Louisiana Normal	2	–	2	–	1	4	–	3	–	1
Southeastern Louisiana	1	–	3	–	0	4	–	5	–	0
Centenary	0	–	1	–	1	0	–	8	–	2
Louisiana College	0	–	4	–	0	4	–	7	–	0
$ – Conference champion

1941 Maine Intercollegiate Athletic Conference football standings
	Conf.					Overall
Team	W		L		T	W		L		T
Bates $	2	–	0	–	0	3	–	4	–	0
Colby	1	–	0	–	1	4	–	2	–	1
Maine	1	–	1	–	1	3	–	2	–	2
Bowdoin	0	–	3	–	0	1	–	6	–	0
+ – Conference co-champions

1941 Minnesota Intercollegiate Athletic Conference football standings
	Conf.					Overall
Team	W		L		T	W		L		T
St. Thomas (MN) $	5	–	0	–	0	7	–	1	–	0
Macalester	4	–	2	–	0	5	–	3	–	0
Concordia (MN)	3	–	2	–	0	5	–	2	–	0
Saint Mary's (MN)	3	–	2	–	0	4	–	3	–	0
Hamline	2	–	3	–	0	4	–	3	–	0
St. Olaf	2	–	3	–	0	2	–	4	–	1
Saint John's (MN)	1	–	3	–	0	3	–	4	–	0
Augsburg	0	–	5	–	0	1	–	6	–	0
$ – Conference champion

1941 Michigan Intercollegiate Athletic Association football standings
	Conf.					Overall
Team	W		L		T	W		L		T
Alma $	4	–	0	–	1	6	–	0	–	1
Albion	3	–	1	–	1	3	–	4	–	1
Hope	2	–	1	–	2	3	–	2	–	3
Kalamazoo	2	–	2	–	1	5	–	2	–	1
Hillsdale	1	–	3	–	1	3	–	4	–	1
Adrian	0	–	5	–	0	2	–	6	–	0
$ – Conference champion

1941 Middle Three Conference football standings
	Conf.					Overall
Team	W		L		T	W		L		T
Lafayette $	2	–	0	–	0	5	–	4	–	0
Rutgers	1	–	1	–	0	7	–	2	–	0
Lehigh	0	–	2	–	0	0	–	6	–	3
$ – Conference champion

1941 Midwest Athletic Association football standings
	Conf.					Overall
Team	W		L		T	W		L		T
Kentucky State $	3	–	0	–	0	6	–	2	–	0
West Virginia State	1	–	1	–	0	3	–	4	–	1
Wilberforce	2	–	2	–	0	3	–	4	–	0
Lincoln (MO)	1	–	2	–	0	3	–	4	–	0
Philander Smith	0	–	2	–	0	1	–	4	–	0
$ – Conference champion

1941 Midwest Conference football standings
	Conf.					Overall
Team	W		L		T	W		L		T
Ripon $	5	–	0	–	1	6	–	2	–	1
Monmouth (IL)	4	–	1	–	1	5	–	2	–	1
Grinnell	4	–	2	–	0	5	–	4	–	0
Lawrence	3	–	2	–	1	4	–	2	–	1
Knox	2	–	3	–	1	3	–	4	–	1
Coe	2	–	5	–	0	2	–	6	–	0
Beloit	2	–	5	–	0	2	–	5	–	0
Cornell (IA)	1	–	5	–	0	1	–	7	–	0
$ – Conference champion

1941 Missouri College Athletic Union football standings
	Conf.					Overall
Team	W		L		T	W		L		T
Missouri Valley $	3	–	0	–	0	7	–	2	–	0
William Jewell	3	–	1	–	0	4	–	4	–	0
Culver–Stockton	2	–	2	–	0	3	–	5	–	0
Central (MO)	1	–	2	–	0	1	–	5	–	2
Tarkio	0	–	4	–	0	0	–	6	–	1
$ – Conference champion

1941 Missouri Intercollegiate Athletic Association football standings
	Conf.					Overall
Team	W		L		T	W		L		T
Maryville (MO) +	3	–	1	–	1	6	–	2	–	1
Missouri Mines +	3	–	1	–	1	4	–	3	–	2
Warrensburg	2	–	1	–	2	3	–	2	–	3
Springfield (MO)	3	–	2	–	0	8	–	3	–	0
Kirksville State	1	–	3	–	1	4	–	4	–	1
Cape Girardeau	0	–	4	–	1	4	–	4	–	1
+ – Conference co-champions; Tie games did not count in standings.

1941 Missouri Valley Conference football standings
	Conf.					Overall
Team	W		L		T	W		L		T
Tulsa $	4	–	0	–	0	8	–	2	–	0
Oklahoma A&M	3	–	1	–	0	5	–	4	–	0
Creighton	3	–	2	–	0	5	–	5	–	0
Saint Louis	1	–	3	–	1	4	–	5	–	1
Washington University	1	–	3	–	0	4	–	5	–	0
Drake	0	–	3	–	1	4	–	5	–	1
$ – Conference champion

1941 Nebraska College Athletic Conference football standings
	Conf.					Overall
Team	W		L		T	W		L		T
Midland $	4	–	0	–	0	9	–	0	–	0
Doane	2	–	1	–	1	5	–	2	–	1
Nebraska Wesleyan	2	–	2	–	0	2	–	6	–	1
Hastings	1	–	2	–	1	1	–	6	–	1
York (NE)	0	–	4	–	0	1	–	7	–	0
$ – Conference champion

1941 Nebraska Intercollegiate Athletic Association football standings
	Conf.					Overall
Team	W		L		T	W		L		T
Kearney State $	3	–	0	–	0	8	–	0	–	0
Wayne State (NE)	1	–	1	–	1	4	–	2	–	2
Peru State	1	–	1	–	1	4	–	3	–	1
Chadron State	0	–	3	–	0	3	–	4	–	0
$ – Conference champion

1941 New England Conference football standings
	Conf.					Overall
Team	W		L		T	W		L		T
Rhode Island State $	2	–	0	–	0	5	–	2	–	1
Maine	2	–	1	–	1	3	–	2	–	2
New Hampshire	0	–	0	–	1	4	–	3	–	1
Northeastern	0	–	1	–	0	4	–	3	–	0
Connecticut	0	–	2	–	0	2	–	6	–	0
$ – Conference champion

1941 North Central Conference football standings
	Conf.					Overall
Team	W		L		T	W		L		T
Iowa State Teachers $	5	–	0	–	0	5	–	3	–	0
South Dakota	4	–	1	–	0	6	–	2	–	0
North Dakota	3	–	1	–	0	4	–	5	–	0
Omaha	2	–	3	–	0	3	–	4	–	1
North Dakota Agricultural	2	–	4	–	0	2	–	7	–	0
Morningside	1	–	4	–	0	3	–	5	–	0
South Dakota State	1	–	5	–	0	2	–	5	–	0
$ – Conference champion

1941 North Dakota Intercollegiate Conference football standings
	Conf.					Overall
Team	W		L		T	W		L		T
Jamestown $	5	–	0	–	0	6	–	2	–	0
Mayville State	3	–	2	–	0	4	–	3	–	0
Ellendale	3	–	2	–	0	3	–	3	–	0
Valley City State	3	–	3	–	0	4	–	3	–	0
Wahpeton	2	–	2	–	0	3	–	3	–	0
Dickinson State	2	–	2	–	0	2	–	3	–	0
Minot State	1	–	4	–	0	1	–	5	–	0
Bottineau	0	–	4	–	0	0	–	4	–	0
$ – Conference champion

1941 North State Conference football standings
	Conf.					Overall
Team	W		L		T	W		L		T
Elon $	6	–	0	–	0	8	–	1	–	0
Catawba	4	–	1	–	0	8	–	3	–	0
Lenoir Rhyne	3	–	3	–	0	4	–	6	–	0
Western Carolina	2	–	2	–	0	3	–	5	–	0
Appalachian State	2	–	3	–	0	4	–	5	–	0
High Point	1	–	5	–	0	2	–	7	–	0
Guilford	0	–	4	–	0	0	–	7	–	0
$ – Conference champion

1941 Northern Teachers College Conference football standings
	Conf.					Overall
Team	W		L		T	W		L		T
St. Cloud State $	4	–	0	–	0	7	–	0	–	0
Mankato State	3	–	1	–	1	3	–	4	–	1
Bemidji State	3	–	2	–	0	6	–	2	–	0
Winona State	1	–	2	–	1	1	–	4	–	1
Duluth State	1	–	4	–	0	1	–	6	–	1
Moorhead State	0	–	3	–	0	0	–	7	–	0
$ – Conference champion

1941 Northwest Conference football standings
	Conf.					Overall
Team	W		L		T	W		L		T
Willamette $	5	–	0	–	0	8	–	2	–	0
Whitman	4	–	1	–	0	5	–	1	–	0
Pacific (OR)	2	–	3	–	0	4	–	4	–	0
Puget Sound	2	–	3	–	0	2	–	6	–	0
College of Idaho	1	–	3	–	0	5	–	5	–	0
Linfield	0	–	4	–	0	1	–	6	–	1
$ – Conference champion

1941 Ohio Athletic Conference football standings
	Conf.					Overall
Team	W		L		T	W		L		T
Case $	4	–	0	–	0	7	–	1	–	0
Toledo	2	–	0	–	0	7	–	4	–	0
Ohio Northern	5	–	0	–	1	6	–	1	–	1
Bowling Green	4	–	0	–	1	5	–	2	–	0
Denison	5	–	1	–	1	7	–	1	–	1
Wooster	5	–	1	–	1	5	–	1	–	1
Kenyon	4	–	1	–	0	5	–	2	–	0
Heidelberg	5	–	2	–	0	6	–	2	–	0
Otterbein	4	–	2	–	0	5	–	3	–	0
Wittenberg	3	–	4	–	0	4	–	4	–	0
Muskingum	2	–	4	–	0	3	–	5	–	0
John Carroll	1	–	2	–	1	2	–	5	–	1
Kent State	1	–	3	–	0	2	–	5	–	1
Marietta	1	–	3	–	0	1	–	6	–	0
Capital	1	–	4	–	0	2	–	4	–	1
Baldwin–Wallace	0	–	2	–	1	3	–	4	–	1
Ashland	0	–	3	–	0	0	–	5	–	0
Findlay	0	–	4	–	0	3	–	5	–	0
Oberlin	0	–	4	–	0	0	–	7	–	0
Mount Union	0	–	6	–	0	1	–	7	–	0
$ – Conference champion

1941 Oklahoma Collegiate Conference football standings
	Conf.					Overall
Team	W		L		T	W		L		T
Central State (OK) $	6	–	0	–	0	6	–	2	–	0
SW Oklahoma State	5	–	1	–	0	9	–	2	–	0
Northeastern State	3	–	3	–	0	5	–	3	–	1
Oklahoma City	2	–	3	–	0	5	–	7	–	0
East Central	2	–	3	–	0	4	–	6	–	0
NW Oklahoma State	0	–	3	–	0	5	–	5	–	1
SE Oklahoma State	0	–	5	–	0	1	–	8	–	0
$ – Conference champion

1941 Pennsylvania State Teachers College Conference football standings
	Conf.					Overall
Team	W		L		T	W		L		T
West Chester +	3	–	0	–	0	5	–	1	–	2
Millersville +	3	–	0	–	0	4	–	2	–	0
Shippensburg	6	–	1	–	0	6	–	2	–	0
Indiana (PA)	4	–	2	–	0	4	–	2	–	0
Clarion	2	–	1	–	1	3	–	2	–	1
East Stroudsburg	3	–	2	–	0	5	–	2	–	0
Lock Haven	2	–	2	–	1	2	–	3	–	2
Edinboro	1	–	2	–	1	2	–	2	–	1
Mansfield	1	–	3	–	1	2	–	4	–	1
Slippery Rock	1	–	3	–	0	2	–	4	–	1
Bloomsburg	1	–	4	–	0	1	–	4	–	0
California (PA)	0	–	2	–	0	0	–	4	–	0
Kutztown	0	–	5	–	0	0	–	6	–	0
+ – Conference co-champions

1941 Rocky Mountain Conference football standings
	Conf.					Overall
Team	W		L		T	W		L		T
Colorado College $	4	–	0	–	0	6	–	2	–	0
Colorado State–Greeley	3	–	1	–	0	3	–	5	–	0
Colorado Mines	1	–	2	–	1	2	–	4	–	2
Montana State	1	–	2	–	1	1	–	4	–	2
Western State (CO)	0	–	4	–	0	0	–	7	–	0
$ – Conference champion

1941 Smoky Mountain Conference football standings
	Conf.					Overall
Team	W		L		T	W		L		T
King $	1	–	0	–	1	5	–	3	–	1
Milligan	2	–	1	–	0	5	–	2	–	0
Carson–Newman	2	–	1	–	1	3	–	5	–	1
East Tennessee State Teachers	0	–	3	–	0	2	–	5	–	0
$ – Conference champion

1941 South Dakota Intercollegiate Conference football standings
	Conf.					Overall
Team	W		L		T	W		L		T
Black Hills	2	–	1	–	0	6	–	2	–	0
South Dakota Mines	2	–	1	–	0	4	–	2	–	1
Southern Normal	1	–	2	–	0	2	–	4	–	0
Eastern Normal	1	–	2	–	0	1	–	4	–	0

1941 Southern California Conference football standings
	Conf.					Overall
Team	W		L		T	W		L		T
Whittier $	3	–	0	–	1	4	–	3	–	1
Occidental	3	–	1	–	0	5	–	2	–	1
Redlands	2	–	1	–	1	3	–	4	–	1
Caltech	1	–	3	–	0	2	–	5	–	0
Pomona	0	–	4	–	0	2	–	5	–	0
$ – Conference champion

1941 Southern Intercollegiate Athletic Association football standings
	Conf.					Overall
Team	W		L		T	W		L		T
Presbyterian $	5	–	0	–	0	6	–	3	–	0
Miami (FL)	2	–	0	–	0	8	–	2	–	0
Centre	2	–	0	–	0	3	–	4	–	0
Mississippi Southern	6	–	0	–	1	9	–	0	–	1
Louisiana Tech	5	–	1	–	0	5	–	4	–	1
Eastern Kentucky	3	–	1	–	0	7	–	1	–	0
SW Louisiana	3	–	1	–	1	6	–	2	–	1
Union (TN)	3	–	1	–	1	5	–	3	–	1
Tennessee Tech	3	–	1	–	0	5	–	4	–	0
Western Kentucky State Teachers	3	–	1	–	1	4	–	5	–	1
Georgetown (KY)	2	–	1	–	0	7	–	2	–	0
Wofford	2	–	1	–	0	4	–	6	–	0
Memphis State	3	–	2	–	0	6	–	3	–	0
Rollins	2	–	2	–	0	5	–	2	–	1
Louisiana Normal	3	–	3	–	1	4	–	3	–	1
Murray State	3	–	3	–	2	4	–	3	–	2
Tampa	2	–	2	–	0	5	–	4	–	0
Louisville	1	–	1	–	0	4	–	4	–	0
Middle Tennessee State Teachers	2	–	3	–	1	4	–	3	–	1
Newberry	2	–	3	–	0	5	–	6	–	0
Mississippi College	1	–	2	–	0	5	–	3	–	0
SE Louisiana	2	–	4	–	0	3	–	6	–	0
Oglethorpe	1	–	3	–	0	3	–	3	–	0
Transylvania	1	–	3	–	0	3	–	5	–	0
Troy State	1	–	4	–	0	5	–	4	–	0
Southeastern Louisiana	0	–	3	–	0	3	–	6	–	1
Louisiana College	1	–	5	–	0	4	–	7	–	0
Delta State	1	–	7	–	1	1	–	8	–	1
Centenary	0	–	1	–	1	0	–	8	–	2
Union (KY)	0	–	1	–	0	0	–	5	–	0
Morehead State	0	–	3	–	0	3	–	4	–	0
Erskine	0	–	4	–	0	2	–	5	–	0
$ – Conference champion

1941 Southwestern Athletic Conference football standings
	Conf.					Overall
Team	W		L		T	W		L		T
Prairie View	4	–	0	–	2	7	–	1	–	2
Langston	4	–	1	–	1	9	–	1	–	1
Southern	4	–	2	–	0	5	–	3	–	1
Texas College	3	–	2	–	1	4	–	2	–	1
Bishop	3	–	3	–	0	3	–	4	–	0
Wiley	0	–	5	–	1	1	–	6	–	1
Arkansas AM&N	0	–	5	–	1	1	–	7	–	1
Prairie View's conference title was forfeited after the SWAC ruled at its winter meeting, on December 13, that the Panthers had used an ineligible player, Whiteside.

1941 Texas Conference football standings
	Conf.					Overall
Team	W		L		T	W		L		T
Howard Payne $	6	–	0	–	0	8	–	1	–	1
Abilene Christian	5	–	1	–	0	6	–	3	–	0
Texas Wesleyan	5	–	1	–	0	5	–	3	–	0
Southwestern (TX)	3	–	3	–	1	4	–	3	–	1
McMurry	2	–	4	–	1	4	–	4	–	1
Austin	2	–	4	–	0	2	–	6	–	0
Trinity (TX)	1	–	5	–	0	1	–	7	–	0
Daniel Baker	0	–	6	–	0	0	–	7	–	0
$ – Conference champion

1941 Washington Intercollegiate Conference football standings
	Conf.					Overall
Team	W		L		T	W		L		T
Pacific Lutheran $	4	–	0	–	0	8	–	1	–	0
Eastern Washington	2	–	1	–	1	5	–	2	–	1
Western Washington	2	–	2	–	0	5	–	2	–	1
Saint Martin's	0	–	2	–	2	1	–	4	–	2
Central Washington	0	–	3	–	1	1	–	5	–	1
$ – Conference champion

1941 West Virginia Intercollegiate Athletic Conference football standings
	Conf.					Overall
Team	W		L		T	W		L		T
West Liberty State $	6	–	1	–	0	7	–	1	–	1
Morris Harvey	3	–	0	–	1	5	–	3	–	1
Fairmont State	4	–	2	–	0	5	–	2	–	0
Glenville State	5	–	3	–	0	5	–	3	–	0
Concord	3	–	2	–	0	4	–	4	–	0
West Virginia Tech	3	–	2	–	0	0	–	4	–	2
Potomac State	2	–	3	–	0	3	–	5	–	0
Salem	0	–	5	–	1	0	–	5	–	1
Shepherd	0	–	5	–	0	0	–	5	–	0
West Virginia Wesleyan *	2	–	0	–	1	3	–	4	–	1
Bethany (WV) *	0	–	2	–	1	0	–	6	–	1
Davis & Elkins *	0	–	3	–	0	1	–	10	–	0
$ – Conference champion; * – Did not qualify for conference standings Ties did not count in conference standings.

1941 Wisconsin State Teachers College Conference football standings
	Conf.					Overall
Team	W		L		T	W		L		T
Northern Division
La Crosse State x	3	–	1	–	0	5	–	1	–	0
Stout Institute x	3	–	1	–	0	5	–	2	–	0
Superior State	2	–	2	–	0	4	–	3	–	0
River Falls State	1	–	2	–	1	2	–	3	–	2
Eau Claire State	0	–	3	–	1	0	–	5	–	2
Southern Division
Platteville State x	3	–	0	–	1	3	–	0	–	2
Whitewater State x	3	–	0	–	1	3	–	2	–	1
Stevens Point State	2	–	2	–	0	3	–	4	–	0
Milwaukee State	1	–	3	–	0	1	–	6	–	0
Oshkosh State	0	–	4	–	0	0	–	6	–	0
x – Division champion/co-champions

== Heisman Trophy voting ==
The Heisman Trophy is given to the year's most outstanding player

Player	School	Position	Total
Bruce Smith	Minnesota	HB	554
Angelo Bertelli	Notre Dame	QB	345
Frankie Albert	Stanford	QB	336
Frank Sinkwich	Georgia	HB	249
Bill Dudley	Virginia	HB	237
Endicott Peabody	Harvard	G	153
Edgar Jones	Pittsburgh	RB	151
Bob Westfall	Michigan	FB	147
Steve Lach	Duke	HB	126
Jack Crain	Texas	HB	102

== Bowl games ==
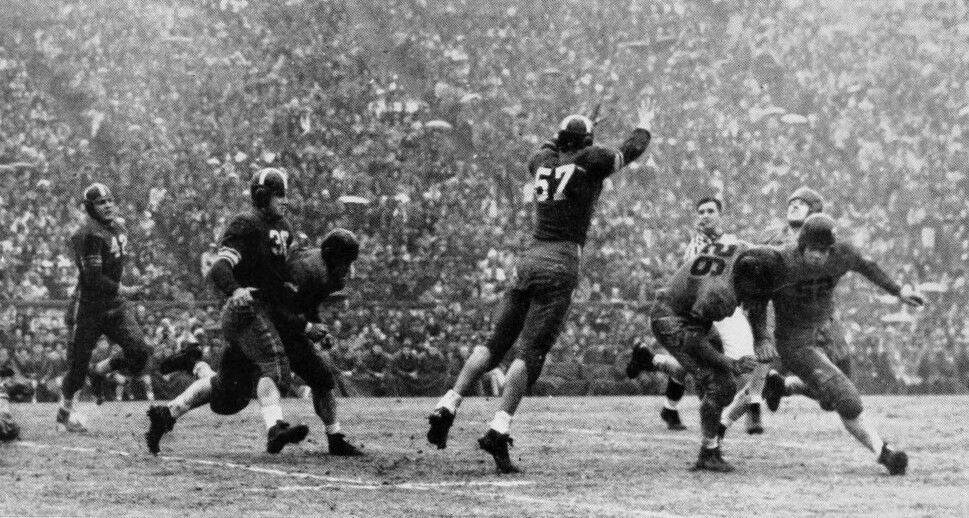
Rose Bowl

Bowl game	Winning team		Losing team	
Rose Bowl	No. 12 Oregon State	20	No. 2 Duke	16
Sugar Bowl	No. 6 Fordham	2	No. 7 Missouri	0
Orange Bowl	No. 14 Georgia	40	TCU	26
Cotton Bowl Classic	No. 20 Alabama	29	No. 9 Texas A&M	21
Sun Bowl	Tulsa	6	Texas Tech	0

== Statistical leaders ==
=== Team leaders ===
==== Total offense ====
Rank	Team	Games played	Net yards gained	Avg. gain per game	First downs
1	Duke	9	3350	372.2	147
2	Arizona	10	3573	357.3	152
3	Georgia	10	3504	350.4	156
4	Utah	8	2803	350.4	112
5	Texas	10	3500	350.0	130
6	Missouri	9	3102	344.7	128
7	Tulane	9	2951	327.9	146
8	Fordham	8	2616	327.0	106
9	Detroit	9	2881	320.1	130
10	Clemson	9	2879	319.9	111

==== Total defense ====
Rank	Team	Games played	Net Ops. Gained	Opps. Av. per Game	Oppon. 1st Downs
1	Duquesne	9	885	110.6	50
2	Navy	10	1258	139.8	67
3	Detroit	8	1282	142.4	76
4	Notre Dame	10	1283	142.6	79
5	Georgia	10	1429	142.9	85
6	Texas Tech	9	1432	143.2	82
7	Duke	10	537	145.7	74
8	San Jose	10	1465	146.5	62
9	Virginia	9	1362	151.3	59
10	Rutgers	10	1211	151.4	56

==== Rushing offense ====
Rank	Team	Games	Rushes	Yards gained	Yards per game
1	Missouri	9	488	2769	307.7
2	Duke	9	498	2392	265.8
3	Minnesota	8	476	2062	257.8
4	Utah	8	398	2054	256.8
5	Syracuse	8	395	2007	250.9
6	Navy	9	494	2249	249.9
7	Georgia	10	511	2397	239.7
8	Texas	10	460	2372	237.2
9	Clemson	9	437	2132	236.9
10	Michigan	8	420	1871	233.9

==== Rushing defense ====
Rank	Team	Games	Rushes	Net yards gained	Yards per game
1	Duquesne	10	235	448	56.0
2	Georgia	10	323	596	59.6
3	Texas Tech	9	328	617	61.7
4	Navy	8	311	560	62.2
5	Texas	9	323	659	65.9
6	Tulane	10	311	597	66.3
7	Santa Clara	10	302	598	66.4
8	Notre Dame	9	340	611	67.9
9	Utah	8	268	602	75.3
10	Rice	9	357	812	81.2

==== Passing offense ====
Rank	Team	Games	Att.	Compl.	Int.	Pct. Compl.	Yards	Yds/Game	Yds/Attempt
1	Arizona	10	231	106	18	.459	1777	177.7	7.69
2	Texas A&M	10	294	126	30	.429	1657	165.7	5.64
3	Washington University (MO)	9	238	116	20	.487	1472	163.6	6.18
4	Detroit	9	185	94	11	.508	1307	145.2	7.06
5	Notre Dame	9	148	81	14	.547	1223	135.9	8.26
6	Texas Mines	9	261	112	27	.429	1219	135.4	4.67
7	Wake Forest	10	197	88	24	.447	1335	133.5	6.78
8	San Francisco	6	102	41	10	.402	756	126.0	7.41
9	Saint Mary's	9	165	69	23	.418	1116	124.0	6.76
10	SMU	10	200	68	17	.340	1201	120.1	6.01

==== Passing defense ====
Rank	Team	Games	Att.	Compl.	Pct. Compl.	Yards	Yds/Game
1	Purdue	8	74	21	.284	217	27.1
2	Boston University	8	85	23	.271	280	35.0
3	Denver	9	98	34	.347	357	39.7
4	Idaho	9	105	30	.286	371	41.2
5	Lafayette	9	104	39	.471	418	46.4
6	Harvard	8	97	27	.278	376	47.0
7	Florida	8	98	23	.235	381	47.6
8	Mississippi State	7	95	28	.295	336	48.0
9	San Jose	10	122	48	.328	490	49.0
10	Villanova	7	89	30	.337	343	49.0
11	Iowa	8	84	24	.286	403	50.4

=== Individual leaders ===
==== Total offense ====
Rank	Player	Team	Games	Plays	Rush Yds	Pass Yds	Total Yds	Avg Gain per Play
1	Bud Schwenk	Washington University (MO)	9	354	471	1457	1928	5.45
2	Bill Dudley	Virginia	9	262	968		1824	6.96
3	Frank Sinkwich	Georgia	10	324	1103	856	1816	5.60
4	Elmer Madarik	Detroit	9	302	667	713	1541	5.10
5	Owen Price	Texas Mines	9	347	475	874	1472	4.24
6	Red Cochran	Wake Forest	10	248	162	1125	1287	5.19
7	Paul Governali	Columbia	8	305	477	810	1287	4.23
8	Derace Moser	Texas A&M	10	273	338	912	1250	4.58
9	Steve Filipowicz	Fordham	8	218	495	724	1219	5.59
10	Johnny Podesto	Saint Mary's	9	220	136	1000	1136	5.16

==== Rushing ====
Rank	Player	Team	Games	Rushes	Yds Gained	Yds Lost	Net Yds	Avg Gain per Play
1	Frank Sinkwich	Georgia	10	209	1159	56	1103	5.28
2	Bill Dudley	Virginia	9	155	1069	101	968	6.25
3	Bob Steuber	Missouri	9	113	941	86	855	7.57
4	John Grigas	Holy Cross	10	179	872	46	826	4.61
5	Pat Harder	Wisconsin	8	142	755	24	731	5.15
6	Bob Westfall	Michigan	8	156	718	30	688	4.41
7	Bill Daley	Minnesota	9	158	707	22	685	4.34
8	Maurice "Red" Wade	Missouri	9	105	681	13	855	6.49
9	Andy Tomasic	Temple	9	173	818	141	677	3.91
10	Dick Fisher	Ohio State	8	134	711	37	674	5.03

==== Passing ====
Rank	Player	Team	Games	Att.	Compl.	Int.	Pct. Compl.	Yds.	TDs
1	Bud Schwenk	Washington University (MO)	9	234	114	19	.487	1457	6.23
2	Owen Price	Texas Mines	9	208	94	19	.452	997	4.79
3	Angelo Bertelli	Notre Dame	9	124	70	11	.565	1037	8.36
4	Paul Governali	Columbia	8	167	70	10	.419	810	4.85
5	Derace Moser	Texas A&M	19	166	67	19	.404	912	5.49
6	Elmer Madarik	Detroit	9	128	64	7	.500	874	6.83
7	Johnny Podesto	Saint Mary's	9	142	61	20	.430	1000	7.04
8	Red Cochran	Wake Forest	10	139	59	20	.424	1125	8.09
9	Jimmy Richardson	Marquette	9	91	58	7	.637	536	5.89
10	Bill Dudley	Virginia	9	107	57	8	.533	856	8,00

==== Receiving ====
Rank	Player	Team	Games	Receptions	Receiving Yards	Avg. Gain per Pass
1	Hank Stanton	Arizona	10	50	820	16.40
2	Red Lindow	Washington University	9	39	472	12.10
3	Len Krause	Penn State	9	32	536	16.75
4	Pufalt	Washington University	9	29	405	3.97
5	Walt McDonald	Tulane	9	27	437	16.19
6	Crain	Baylor	10	26	152	5.85
7	Marshall Spivey	Texas A&M	10	25	363	14.52
8	Turley	Washington University	9	25	363	14.52
9	Henderson	Texas A&M	10	25	229	9.16

==== Scoring ====
The following were the scoring leaders for 1941.

Rank	Player	Team	TD	PAT	FG	Pts
1	Bill Dudley	Virginia	18	23	1	134
2	Ben Collins	West Texas State	18	24	0	132
3	Curt Sandig	St. Mary's (TX)	18	10	0	118
4	Toshio "Tosh" Asano	Citrus J.C.	16	14	0	110
5	Johnny Thompson	Coast Guard	14	22	1	109
6	Ed McGovern	Rose Poly	16	7	0	103
7	Andrew Victor	The Citadel	13	21	0	99
8	Chet Mutryn	Xavier				93
9	Jack Crain	Texas	11	23	1	92
10 (tie)	Jack Jenkins	Vanderbilt	12	15	1	90
10 (tie)	Waddel	Visalia J.C.	15	0	0	90
12	Gant	Florida A&M	14	5	0	89
13	Jones	Union (TN)	14	2	0	86
14	Winston Siegfried	Duke	13	2	0	80
15	Randel	Newberry	13	1	0	79

== Rules Committee ==
- Walter R. Okeson, chairman
- Earl Krieger, secretary
- Amos Alonzo Stagg (Pacific), life member
- W. J. Bingham (Harvard), 1st District
- Wilmer G. Crowell, 2nd District
- William Alexander (Georgia Tech), 3rd District]
- Fritz Crisler (Michigan), 4th District (substituting for Bernie Bierman)
- George F. Veenker (Iowa State), 5th District
- Dana X. Bible (Texas), 6th District
- C. W. Hubbard, 7th District (substituting for Lou H. Mahony)
- Willis O. Hunter (USC), 8th District

== See also ==
- 1941 College Football All-America Team
- Plainfield Teachers College, a fictitious college football team created as a hoax during the 1941 season
