= 1941 Portland Pilots football team =

American college football season

1941 Portland Pilots football
- Conference: Independent
- Record: 3–5
- Head coach: Robert L. Mathews (5th season)
- Home stadium: Multnomah Stadium

1941 Western college football independents records
	Conf.			Overall
Team	W	L	T	W		L		T
Hawaii		–		8	–	1	–	0
Santa Clara		–		6	–	3	–	0
San Francisco		–		6	–	4	–	0
Idaho Southern Branch		–		5	–	1	–	2
Cal Poly		–		5	–	3	–	1
Saint Mary's		–		5	–	4	–	0
Loyola (CA)		–		5	–	5	–	0
Nevada		–		3	–	5	–	1
Portland		–		3	–	5	–	0
Gonzaga		–		3	–	7	–	0
San Francisco State		–		2	–	4	–	1
Humboldt State		–		2	–	5	–	1
La Verne		–		0	–	6	–	0

The 1941 Portland Pilots football team was an American football team that represented the University of Portland as an independent during the 1941 college football season. In its fifth year under head coach Robert L. Mathews, the team compiled a 3–5 record.

Portland was ranked at No. 218 (out of 681 teams) in the final rankings under the Litkenhous Difference by Score System.

The team played its home games at Multnomah Stadium in Portland, Oregon.

== Schedule ==
Date	Opponent	Site	Result	Attendance	Source
September 20	Hawaii	Multnomah Stadium; Portland, OR	L 6–33	9,000	
September 25	Pacific (OR)	Multnomah Stadium; Portland, OR	W 30–7		
October 2	Willamette	Multnomah Stadium; Portland, OR	L 0–26		
October 19	at Saint Mary's	Kezar Stadium; San Francisco, CA	L 0–31	< 5,000	
October 26	at Gonzaga	Gonzaga Stadium; Spokane, WA	L 13–19	2,500	
November 2	Fort Ord	Multnomah Stadium; Portland, OR	L 25–28		
November 16	Gonzaga	Multnomah Stadium; Portland, OR	W 37–0		
November 21	at Pacific Lutheran	Tacoma, WA	W 20–6		
