= 1941 Colorado College Tigers football team =

American college football season

1941 Colorado College Tigers football

RMC champion
- Conference: Rocky Mountain Conference
- Record: 6–2 (4–0 RMC)
- Head coach: Juan Reid (1st season)
- Home stadium: Washburn Field

1941 Rocky Mountain Conference football standings
	Conf.					Overall
Team	W		L		T	W		L		T
Colorado College $	4	–	0	–	0	6	–	2	–	0
Colorado State–Greeley	3	–	1	–	0	3	–	5	–	0
Colorado Mines	1	–	2	–	1	2	–	4	–	2
Montana State	1	–	2	–	1	1	–	4	–	2
Western State (CO)	0	–	4	–	0	0	–	7	–	0
$ – Conference champion

The 1941 Colorado College Tigers football team was an American football team represented Colorado College as a member of the Rocky Mountain Conference during the 1941 college football season. In their first and only season under head coach Juan Reid, the team compiled an overall record of 6–2 record with a mark of 4–0 against conference opponents, winning the RMC title for the second consecutive year.

Colorado College players were selected by the Associated Press for five of eleven first-team slots on the 1941 All-Rocky Mountain Conference football team. The five players to receive first-team honors were: senior end Al Ritchie; senior guard Lou Miller; senior center Sog Pantor; junior quarterback Junie Schuler; and junior fullback Bill Singen. Four other Colorado College players were selected for the second team: end Dale Peterson; guard Bernard Wiener; quarterback John Clark; and halfback Tom Pelican. Tackle Henry Elkins was named to the third team.

Colorado College was ranked at No. 211 (out of 681 teams) in the final rankings under the Litkenhous Difference by Score System.

In May 1942, coach Reid stepped down as the school's head football and basketball coach for military service with the U.S. Army Air Force technical training command.

== Schedule ==
Date	Opponent	Site	Result	Attendance	Source
September 27	Regis*	Washburn Field; Colorado Springs, CO	W 42–0	1,676	
October 4	Western State (CO)	Washburn Field; Colorado Springs, CO	W 19–0		
October 11	Montana State	Washburn Field; Colorado Springs, CO	W 28–7		
October 18	at Colorado Mines	Brooks Field; Golden, CO	W 20–19	4,500	
November 1	Wyoming*^{†}	Washburn Field; Colorado Springs, CO	W 16–0		
November 11	Colorado State–Greeley	Washburn Field; Colorado Springs, CO	W 19–6	5,371	
November 22	Grinnell*	Washburn Field; Colorado Springs, CO	L 0–12		
November 29	at Occidental*	Patterson Field; Los Angeles, CA	L 20–34	7,000	
*Non-conference game; ^{†}Homecoming
