= 1941 Saint Mary's Gaels football team =

American college football season

1941 Saint Mary's Gaels football
- Conference: Independent
- Record: 5–4
- Head coach: Red Strader (2nd season)
- Home stadium: Kezar Stadium

1941 Western college football independents records
	Conf.			Overall
Team	W	L	T	W		L		T
Hawaii		–		8	–	1	–	0
Santa Clara		–		6	–	3	–	0
San Francisco		–		6	–	4	–	0
Idaho Southern Branch		–		5	–	1	–	2
Cal Poly		–		5	–	3	–	1
Saint Mary's		–		5	–	4	–	0
Loyola (CA)		–		5	–	5	–	0
Nevada		–		3	–	5	–	1
Portland		–		3	–	5	–	0
Gonzaga		–		3	–	7	–	0
San Francisco State		–		2	–	4	–	1
Humboldt State		–		2	–	5	–	1
La Verne		–		0	–	6	–	0

The 1941 Saint Mary's Gaels football team was an American football team that represented Saint Mary's College of California during the 1941 college football season. They played their home games off campus at Kezar Stadium in San Francisco. In their second and final season under head coach Red Strader, the Gaels compiled a 5–4 record and outscored their opponents by a combined total of 133 to 123.

Saint Mary's was ranked at No. 81 (out of 681 teams) in the final rankings under the Litkenhous Difference by Score System for 1941.

== Schedule ==
Date	Opponent	Site	Result	Attendance	Source
September 27	at California	California Memorial Stadium; Berkeley, CA	L 0–31	60,000	
October 4	Moffett Field	Kezar Stadium; San Francisco, CA	W 6–0		
October 12	vs. San Francisco	Kezar Stadium; San Francisco, CA	W 30–0	15,000	
October 19	Portland	Kezar Stadium; San Francisco, CA	W 31–0	< 5,000	
October 26	at Loyola (CA)	Gilmore Stadium; Los Angeles, CA	W 20–13	18,000	
November 2	Gonzaga	Kezar Stadium; San Francisco, CA	W 26–0	300	
November 9	No. 12 Duquesne	Kezar Stadium; San Francisco, CA	L 0–9	25,000	
November 16	vs. Santa Clara	Kezar Stadium; San Francisco, CA	L 13–35	40,000	
November 22	at No. 11 Fordham	Polo Grounds; New York, NY	L 7–35	40,000	
Rankings from AP Poll released prior to the game
