= 1941 San Francisco State Gators football team =

American college football season

1941 San Francisco State Gaters football
- Conference: Independent
- Record: 2–4–1
- Head coach: Dick Boyle (3rd season)
- Home stadium: Seals Stadium

1941 Western college football independents records
	Conf.			Overall
Team	W	L	T	W		L		T
Hawaii		–		8	–	1	–	0
Santa Clara		–		6	–	3	–	0
San Francisco		–		6	–	4	–	0
Idaho Southern Branch		–		5	–	1	–	2
Cal Poly		–		5	–	3	–	1
Saint Mary's		–		5	–	4	–	0
Loyola (CA)		–		5	–	5	–	0
Nevada		–		3	–	5	–	1
Portland		–		3	–	5	–	0
Gonzaga		–		3	–	7	–	0
San Francisco State		–		2	–	4	–	1
Humboldt State		–		2	–	5	–	1
La Verne		–		0	–	6	–	0

The 1941 San Francisco State States football team represented San Francisco State College—now known as San Francisco State University—as an independent during the 1941 college football season. Led by third-year head coach Dick Boyle, San Francisco State compiled a record of 2–4–1 and was outscored by its opponents 75 to 33. The team played home games at Seals Stadium in San Francisco.

== Schedule ==
Date	Time	Opponent	Site	Result	Source
September 20		at San Francisco Junior College	Seals Stadium; San Francisco, CA	L 6–7	
September 27		at Humboldt State	Albee Stadium; Eureka, CA	L 2–14	
October 4	8:00 p.m.	vs. Mather Field Air Corps (Note: Mather Air Force Base was a United States Air Force Base from 1918 to 1993)	Seals Stadium; San Francisco, CA	T 0–0	
October 10		San Mateo	Seals Stadium; San Francisco, CA	L 0–26	
October 18		Moffett Field Air Corps (Note: Naval Air Station Moffett Field was a Naval Air Station from 1933 to 1994.)*	Seals Stadium; San Francisco, CA	Cancelled	
October 25		at La Verne	La Verne, CA	W 13–7	
October 31		at Cal Poly	Mustang Stadium; San Luis Obispo, CA	L 0–14	
November 7		Chico State*	Seals Stadium; San Francisco, CA	W 12–7	
*Non-conference game; All times are in Pacific time
