= Spec Keene =

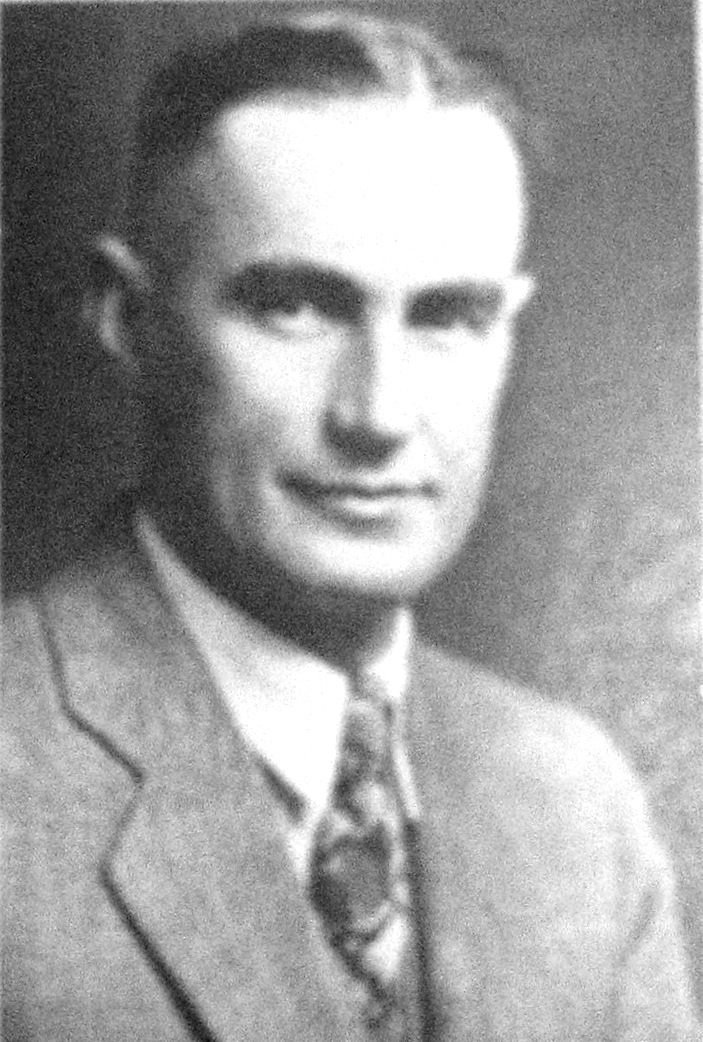
- Keene in 1928

Biographical details
- Born: July 1, 1894; Hopewell, Oregon, U.S.
- Died: August 24, 1977 (aged 83); Corvallis, Oregon, U.S.

Playing career

Baseball
- c. 1920: Oregon State
- Position: Pitcher

Coaching career (HC unless noted)

Football
- 1926–1942: Willamette

Basketball
- 1926–1937: Willamette
- 1942–1943: Willamette

Administrative career (AD unless noted)
- 1947–1964: Oregon State

Head coaching record
- Overall: 84–51–6 (football); 159–100 (basketball)

Accomplishments and honors

Championships
- Football; 9 NWC (1929, 1934–1938, 1940–1942) Basketball; 7 NWC (1927, 1929–1931, 1933, 1937, 1943)

Roy Servais "Spec" Keene (July 1, 1894 – August 24, 1977) was an American football, baseball, and basketball coach at Willamette University and an athletic director at Oregon State University.

== Playing career ==
Keene graduated from Oregon State University in 1921, where he was a pitcher on the baseball team, and was chosen as team captain in his junior year.

== Coaching career ==
After graduating from Oregon State, Keene signed on with Willamette University's athletic department, where he coached three sports: football for 17 years, baseball for 16 years, and basketball for 11 years. Combined, Keene's teams won or shared 19 Northwest Conference championships, and in the 1929–30 academic year, each of his three teams were undefeated and won conference championships. Keene is considered the "father of Willamette athletics" and was a charter member of the University's Athletic Hall of Fame in 1991.

=== Attack on Pearl Harbor ===
On December 6, 1941, Keene's Willamette football team was in Honolulu, Hawaii, where they lost a game to Hawaii, 20–6. The following day, the players and fans had intended to do some sightseeing around Hawaii, but instead, were witness to Japan's attack on Pearl Harbor. The players, now stranded in Hawaii, were enlisted to string barbed wire on Waikiki Beach and were given rifles and assigned to protect the beach and later the hills above Honolulu. Keene, along with future Oregon governor Douglas McKay, who had traveled with the football team, finally arranged passage home for the players on December 19 on an overloaded luxury liner, the SS President Coolidge. The team arrived in San Francisco on Christmas Day after taking a circuitous route to avoid Japanese submarines. In 1997, the entire team was inducted into Willamette's Athletic Hall of Fame.

== Return to Oregon State ==
Keene as he appeared shortly after he assumed the position of athletic director at Oregon State.

Following World War II, in 1947, Keene returned to Oregon State to serve as athletic director. He served in that post for 26 years, the longest tenure of any Oregon State athletic director. During his term, he oversaw construction of the University's two major sports facilities: Gill Coliseum in 1949 and Parker Stadium (later renamed Reser Stadium) in 1953. Keene was President of the Pacific Coast Conference Athletics Directors Association and served on the executive committee of the NCAA.

== Legacy ==
In 1989, Willamette University built a new baseball stadium, which they named Roy S. "Spec" Keene Stadium. In addition to the Willamette University Athletic Hall of Fame, Keene was inducted into the Oregon Sports Hall of Fame in 1982 for his coaching, and the Oregon State University Sports Hall of Fame in 1991 for his service as athletic director. He died in Corvallis on August 24, 1977.

== Head coaching record ==
=== Football ===
Year	Team	Overall	Conference	Standing	Bowl/playoffs
Willamette Bearcats (Northwest Conference) (1926–1942)
1926	Willamette	2–4	1–2	5th	
1927	Willamette	3–3–2	2–2–1	3rd	
1928	Willamette	3–5	2–3	T–4th	
1929	Willamette	6–2	5–0	1st	
1930	Willamette	5–3	4–1	2nd	
1931	Willamette	5–4	3–2	T–2nd	
1932	Willamette	4–4–1	4–1–1	2nd	
1933	Willamette	6–3	4–1	2nd	
1934	Willamette	8–1	5–0	T–1st	
1935	Willamette	5–2	4–0	1st	
1936	Willamette	7–2–1	6–0	1st	
1937	Willamette	6–3	3–0	1st	
1938	Willamette	5–3	4–1	T–1st	
1939	Willamette	3–4–2	3–1–1	2nd	
1940	Willamette	4–5	4–0	1st	
1941	Willamette	8–2	5–0	1st	
1942	Willamette	4–1	4–0	1st	
Willamette:		84–51–6	63–14–3		
Total:		84–51–6			
National championship Conference title Conference division title or championship game berth

=== Basketball ===
Record table
Season	Team	Overall	Conference	Standing	Postseason
Willamette Bearcats (Northwest Conference) (1926–1937)
1926–27	Willamette	14–6	10–2	T–1st	
1927–28	Willamette	13–7	7–2	2nd	
1928–29	Willamette	10–4	7–1	T–1st	
1929–30	Willamette	14–4	8–0	1st	
1930–31	Willamette	15–3	10–1	1st	
1931–32	Willamette	16–12	7–3	3rd	
1932–33	Willamette	18–3	9–1	1st	
1933–34	Willamette	9–13	6–4	3rd	
1934–35	Willamette	7–17	4–5	5th	
1935–36	Willamette	10–16	3–5	5th	
1936–37	Willamette	22–6	10–0	1st	
Willamette Bearcats (Northwest Conference) (1942–1943)
1942–43	Willamette	11–9	5–1	T–1st	
Willamette:		159–100	86–25		
Total:		159–100			
National champion Postseason invitational champion Conference regular season champion Conference regular season and conference tournament champion Division regular season champion Division regular season and conference tournament champion Conference tournament champion
