= 1941 Santa Clara Broncos football team =

American college football season

1941 Santa Clara Broncos football
- Conference: Independent
- Record: 6–3
- Head coach: Buck Shaw (6th season)
- Home stadium: Kezar Stadium

1941 Western college football independents records
	Conf.			Overall
Team	W	L	T	W		L		T
Hawaii		–		8	–	1	–	0
Santa Clara		–		6	–	3	–	0
San Francisco		–		6	–	4	–	0
Idaho Southern Branch		–		5	–	1	–	2
Cal Poly		–		5	–	3	–	1
Saint Mary's		–		5	–	4	–	0
Loyola (CA)		–		5	–	5	–	0
Nevada		–		3	–	5	–	1
Portland		–		3	–	5	–	0
Gonzaga		–		3	–	7	–	0
San Francisco State		–		2	–	4	–	1
Humboldt State		–		2	–	5	–	1
La Verne		–		0	–	6	–	0

The 1941 Santa Clara Broncos football team represented Santa Clara University as an independent during the 1941 college football season. In its sixth season under head coach Buck Shaw, the team compiled a 6–3 record and outscored opponents by a total of 170 to 103.

After winning its first four games, including shutout victories over California and Michigan State, Santa Clara rose to No. 8 in the AP poll released on October 20. The team then fell from the rankings, losing three consecutive games against Oklahoma, Stanford, and Oregon. The team rebounded with victories over UCLA and rival Saint Mary's to conclude the season.

Santa Clara was ranked at No. 36 (out of 681 teams) in the final rankings under the Litkenhous Difference by Score System for 1941.

== Schedule ==
Date	Opponent	Rank	Site	Result	Attendance	Source
September 27	San Francisco		Kezar Stadium; San Francisco, CA	W 32–7	25,000	
October 5	Loyola (CA)		Kezar Stadium; San Francisco, CA	W 20–6	7,500	
October 11	at California		California Memorial Stadium; Berkeley, CA	W 13–0	56,000	
October 18	Michigan State	No. 9	Kezar Stadium; San Francisco, CA	W 7–0	18,000	
October 25	at Oklahoma	No. 8	Oklahoma Memorial Stadium; Norman, OK	L 6–16	22,000	
November 1	at No. 12 Stanford		Stanford Stadium; Stanford, CA	L 7–27	65,000	
November 11	at Oregon		Multnomah Stadium; Portland, OR	L 19–21	15,854	
November 16	Saint Mary's		Kezar Stadium; San Francisco, CA	W 35–13	40,000	
November 22	at UCLA		Los Angeles Memorial Coliseum; Los Angeles, CA	W 31–13	25,000	
Rankings from AP Poll released prior to the game

== Rankings ==
Ranking movements Legend: ██ Increase in ranking ██ Decrease in ranking — = Not ranked ( ) = First-place votes
	Week							
Poll	1	2	3	4	5	6	7	Final
AP	9 (1)	8	—	—	—	—	—	—
