= 1941 Loyola Lions football team =

American college football season

1941 Loyola Lions football
- Conference: Independent
- Record: 5–5
- Head coach: Marty Brill (2nd season)
- Home stadium: Gilmore Stadium

1941 Western college football independents records
	Conf.			Overall
Team	W	L	T	W		L		T
Hawaii		–		8	–	1	–	0
Santa Clara		–		6	–	3	–	0
San Francisco		–		6	–	4	–	0
Idaho Southern Branch		–		5	–	1	–	2
Cal Poly		–		5	–	3	–	1
Saint Mary's		–		5	–	4	–	0
Loyola (CA)		–		5	–	5	–	0
Nevada		–		3	–	5	–	1
Portland		–		3	–	5	–	0
Gonzaga		–		3	–	7	–	0
San Francisco State		–		2	–	4	–	1
Humboldt State		–		2	–	5	–	1
La Verne		–		0	–	6	–	0

The 1941 Loyola Lions football team was an American football team that represented Loyola University of Los Angeles (now known as Loyola Marymount University) as an independent during the 1941 college football season. In their second season under head coach Marty Brill, the Lions compiled a 5–5 record.

Loyola was ranked at No. 106 (out of 681 teams) in the final rankings under the Litkenhous Difference by Score System for 1941.

== Schedule ==
Date	Opponent	Site	Result	Attendance	Source
September 26	Redlands	Gilmore Stadium; Los Angeles, CA	W 20–0	7,000	
October 5	at Santa Clara	Kezar Stadium; San Francisco, CA	L 6–20	7,500	
October 10	Texas Tech	Gilmore Stadium; Los Angeles, CA	L 0–14	15,000	
October 17	Texas Mines	Gilmore Stadium; Los Angeles, CA	W 20–6	8,500	
October 26	Saint Mary's	Gilmore Stadium; Los Angeles, CA	L 13–20	18,000	
November 2	Saint Louis	Gilmore Stadium; Los Angeles, CA	L 13–21	8,500	
November 9	San Francisco	Gilmore Stadium; Los Angeles, CA	L 20–27	9,000	
November 16	Creighton	Gilmore Stadium; Los Angeles, CA	W 32–7		
November 22	at New Mexico	Hilltop Stadium; Albuquerque, NM	W 7–3	3,500	
November 30	Nevada	Gilmore Stadium; Los Angeles, CA	W 19–7	8,000	
