= 1941 Iowa State Teachers Panthers football team =

American college football season

1941 Iowa State Teachers Panthers football

NCC champion
- Conference: North Central Conference
- Record: 5–3 (5–0 NCC)
- Head coach: Clyde Starbeck (6th season)
- Home stadium: O. R. Latham Stadium

1941 North Central Conference football standings
	Conf.					Overall
Team	W		L		T	W		L		T
Iowa State Teachers $	5	–	0	–	0	5	–	3	–	0
South Dakota	4	–	1	–	0	6	–	2	–	0
North Dakota	3	–	1	–	0	4	–	5	–	0
Omaha	2	–	3	–	0	3	–	4	–	1
North Dakota Agricultural	2	–	4	–	0	2	–	7	–	0
Morningside	1	–	4	–	0	3	–	5	–	0
South Dakota State	1	–	5	–	0	2	–	5	–	0
$ – Conference champion

The 1941 Iowa State Teachers Panthers football team represented Iowa State Teachers College in the North Central Conference during the 1941 college football season. In their sixth season under head coach Clyde Starbeck, the team compiled a 5–3 record (5–0 against NCC opponents), won the conference championship, and outscored opponents by a total of 151 to 29.

Four Panthers players were selected by the college sports editors to the 1941 All-North Central Conference football team: tackle Don Barnhart, guard Aaron Linn, center Bob Hunt, and halfback Gene Goodwillie.

Iowa State Teachers was ranked at No. 221 (out of 681 teams) in the final rankings under the Litkenhous Difference by Score System.

== Schedule ==
Date	Opponent	Site	Result	Attendance	Source
September 27	at South Dakota State	Brookings, SD	W 21–0		
October 4	North Dakota	O. R. Latham Stadium; Cedar Falls, IA	W 32–10		
October 10	Morningside	O. R. Latham Stadium; Cedar Falls, IA	W 13–0		
October 18	Western Michigan*^{†}	O. R. Latham Stadium; Cedar Falls, IA	L 7–28	6,000	
October 25	at Pittsburg State*	Pittsburg, KS	L 6–12		
November 1	North Dakota Agricultural	O. R. Latham Stadium; Cedar Falls, IA	W 51–6	1,500	
November 8	at Drake*	Drake Stadium; Des Moines, IA	L 0–13	3,500	
November 15	Omaha	O. R. Latham Stadium; Cedar Falls, IA	W 34–13		
*Non-conference game; ^{†}Homecoming
