= 1941 San Francisco Dons football team =

American college football season

1941 San Francisco Dons football
- Conference: Independent
- Record: 6–4
- Head coach: Jeff Cravath (1st season)
- Home stadium: Kezar Stadium; Seals Stadium

1941 Western college football independents records
| | Conf. | | | Overall |
| Team | W | L | T | W | | L | | T |
|---|---|---|---|---|---|---|---|---|
| Hawaii | | – | | 8 | – | 1 | – | 0 |
| Santa Clara | | – | | 6 | – | 3 | – | 0 |
| San Francisco | | – | | 6 | – | 4 | – | 0 |
| Idaho Southern Branch | | – | | 5 | – | 1 | – | 2 |
| Cal Poly | | – | | 5 | – | 3 | – | 1 |
| Saint Mary's | | – | | 5 | – | 4 | – | 0 |
| Loyola (CA) | | – | | 5 | – | 5 | – | 0 |
| Nevada | | – | | 3 | – | 5 | – | 1 |
| Portland | | – | | 3 | – | 5 | – | 0 |
| Gonzaga | | – | | 3 | – | 7 | – | 0 |
| San Francisco State | | – | | 2 | – | 4 | – | 1 |
| Humboldt State | | – | | 2 | – | 5 | – | 1 |
| La Verne | | – | | 0 | – | 6 | – | 0 |

The 1941 San Francisco Dons football team was an American football team that represented the University of San Francisco as an independent during the 1941 college football season. In their first and only season under head coach Jeff Cravath, the Dons compiled a 6–4 record and were outscored by their opponents by a combined total of 206 to 193.

San Francisco was ranked at No. 82 (out of 681 teams) in the final rankings under the Litkenhous Difference by Score System for 1941.

== Schedule ==
| Date | Opponent | Site | Result | Attendance | Source |
|---|---|---|---|---|---|
| September 28 | Santa Clara | Kezar Stadium; San Francisco, CA | L 7–32 | 25,000 | |
| October 3 | Nevada | Seals Stadium; San Francisco, CA | W 7–3 | 6,000 | |
| October 12 | Saint Mary's | Kezar Stadium; San Francisco, CA | L 0–30 | 15,000 | |
| October 18 | at Stanford | Stanford Stadium; Stanford, CA | L 26–42 | 7,000 | |
| October 24 | BYU | Seals Stadium; San Francisco, CA | W 25–13 | | |
| November 1 | at Fresno State | Ratcliffe Stadium; Fresno, CA | W 47–27 | 12,000 | |
| November 9 | at Loyola (CA) | Gilmore Stadium; Los Angeles, CA | W 27–20 | 9,000 | |
| November 22 | San Jose State | Kezar Stadium; San Francisco, CA | W 20–0 | 8,000 | |
| November 30 | Fort Ord | Kezar Stadium; San Francisco, CA | W 21–13 | | |
| December 6 | Mississippi State | Kezar Stadium; San Francisco, CA | L 13–26 | 25,000 | |
