= 1941 Hawaii Rainbows football team =

American college football season

1941 Hawaii Rainbows football
- Conference: Independent
- Record: 8–1
- Head coach: Eugene Gill (2nd season); Tom Kaulukukui (1st season)
- Home stadium: Honolulu Stadium

1941 Western college football independents records
	Conf.			Overall
Team	W	L	T	W		L		T
Hawaii		–		8	–	1	–	0
Santa Clara		–		6	–	3	–	0
San Francisco		–		6	–	4	–	0
Idaho Southern Branch		–		5	–	1	–	2
Cal Poly		–		5	–	3	–	1
Saint Mary's		–		5	–	4	–	0
Loyola (CA)		–		5	–	5	–	0
Nevada		–		3	–	5	–	1
Portland		–		3	–	5	–	0
Gonzaga		–		3	–	7	–	0
San Francisco State		–		2	–	4	–	1
Humboldt State		–		2	–	5	–	1
La Verne		–		0	–	6	–	0

The 1941 Hawaii Rainbows football team was an American football team that represented the University of Hawaii as an independent during the 1941 college football season. The team compiled an 8–1 record and outscored opponents by a total of 280 to 83. The season was shortened by two games following the attack on Pearl Harbor.

Tom Kaulukukui and Eugene Gill were co-head coaches. It was Kaulukukui's first year as a head coach; Gill had been head coach of the team in 1940 as well.

During a September 24 game against Pacific (CA) in Stockton, California, a distressed army flying cadet tried to land his plane at the stadium, diving for 30 minutes "a few feet over the heads of terrified spectators and players and clipped the stadium power line, darkening the field." The cadet ultimately landed his plane safely in the stadium parking lot.

Hawaii was ranked at No. 69 (out of 681 teams) in the final rankings under the Litkenhous Difference by Score System for 1941.

== Schedule ==
Date	Opponent	Site	Result	Attendance	Source
September 24	at Pacific (CA)	Baxter Stadium; Stockton, CA	W 14–0	12,000	
September 20	at Portland	Multnomah Stadium; Portland, OR	W 33–6	9,000	
October 10	Hawaii Bears	Honolulu Stadium; Honolulu, Territory of Hawaii	W 20–6	20,000	
October 17	Na Alii	Honolulu Stadium; Honolulu, Territory of Hawaii	W 19–6	15,000	
October 27	Healani	Honolulu Stadium; Honolulu, Territory of Hawaii	L 6–26	19,000	
November 7	Na Alii	Honolulu Stadium; Honolulu, Territory of Hawaii	W 33–14	4,000	
November 19	Hawaii Bears	Honolulu Stadium; Honolulu, Territory of Hawaii	W 27–13	5,500	
November 26	Healani	Honolulu Stadium; Honolulu, Territory of Hawaii	W 21–6	11,000	
December 6	Willamette	Honolulu Stadium; Honolulu, Territory of Hawaii (Shrine Football Classic)	W 20–6	25,000	
December 13	San Jose State	Honolulu Stadium; Honolulu, Territory of Hawaii	No contest		
January 1, 1942	Nevada	Honolulu Stadium; Honolulu, Territory of Hawaii	No contest		

== Shrine Game and Pearl Harbor ==
On the afternoon of December 6, 1941, in the Shrine Football Classic, Hawaii defeated Willamette at Honolulu Stadium. The game drew a crowd of 25,000 persons, the largest paid attendance in Hawaii history to that point. The attendees included Territorial Governor Joseph Poindexter, Honolulu Mayor Lester Petrie, and Lt. Gen. Walter Short, the U.S. military commander responsible for the defense of U.S. military installations in Hawaii; the game was preceded by a "spectacle" of marching bands, including performances by the U.S. Marine band and bands from the University of Hawaii, Royal Hawaiian, McKinley High, St. Louis College, Kamehameha, Roosevelt High, Punahou Academy, Honolulu Plantation Co., and others.

Early the following morning, the Attack on Pearl Harbor occurred, beginning the Pacific War. The team's remaining game against San Jose State and Nevada were cancelled. The San Jose State team was already in Honolulu at the time of the attack. The San Jose State and Willamette players were stranded in Hawaii due to the emergency following the attack. The Hawaii, Willamette, and San Jose State football teams all volunteered to perform special police duties during the emergency.

The Hawaii football program was suspended for the duration of the war.
