= 1941 North Dakota Agricultural Bison football team =

American college football season

1941 North Dakota Agricultural Bison football
- Conference: North Central Conference
- Record: 2–7 (2–4 NCC)
- Head coach: Stan Kostka (1st season)
- Home stadium: Dacotah Field

1941 North Central Conference football standings
	Conf.					Overall
Team	W		L		T	W		L		T
Iowa State Teachers $	5	–	0	–	0	5	–	3	–	0
South Dakota	4	–	1	–	0	6	–	2	–	0
North Dakota	3	–	1	–	0	4	–	5	–	0
Omaha	2	–	3	–	0	3	–	4	–	1
North Dakota Agricultural	2	–	4	–	0	2	–	7	–	0
Morningside	1	–	4	–	0	3	–	5	–	0
South Dakota State	1	–	5	–	0	2	–	5	–	0
$ – Conference champion

The 1941 North Dakota Agricultural Bison football team was an American football team that represented North Dakota Agricultural College (now known as North Dakota State University) in the North Central Conference (NCC) during the 1941 college football season. In its first season under head coach Stan Kostka, the team compiled a 2–7 record (2–4 against NCC opponents) and finished fourth in the NCC. The team played its home games at Dacotah Field in Fargo, North Dakota.

Prior to the 1941 season, the Bison had not won a game against a NCC opponent since 1938. The team broke the streak with two conference victories in 1941.

== Schedule ==
Date	Opponent	Site	Result	Attendance	Source
September 19	Concordia (MN)*	Dacotah Field; Fargo, ND	L 7–13		
September 27	Morningside	Dacotah Field; Fargo, ND	L 6–25		
October 4	at Montana*	Dornblaser Field; Missoula, MT	L 0–27	> 3,000	
October 11	South Dakota State^{†}	Dacotah Field; Fargo, ND (rivalry)	W 25–0		
October 18	Omaha	Dacotah Field; Fargo, ND	W 13–6		
October 25	at North Dakota	Memorial Stadium; Grand Forks, ND (rivalry)	L 6–20		
November 1	at Iowa State Teachers	O. R. Latham Stadium; Cedar Falls, IA	L 6–51	1,500	
November 8	at Tulsa*	Skelly Field; Tulsa, OK	L 6–61	7,000	
November 15	at South Dakota	Inman Field; Vermillion, SD	L 0–18		
*Non-conference game; ^{†}Homecoming
