= 1941 Pacific Tigers football team =

American college football season

1941 Pacific Tigers football

FWC champion
- Conference: Far Western Conference
- Record: 4–7 (3–0 FWC)
- Head coach: Amos Alonzo Stagg (9th season)
- Home stadium: Baxter Stadium

1941 Far Western Conference football standings
	Conf.					Overall
Team	W		L		T	W		L		T
Pacific (CA) $	3	–	0	–	0	4	–	7	–	0
Cal Aggies	2	–	1	–	0	2	–	2	–	4
Chico State	1	–	2	–	0	1	–	5	–	2
Humboldt State	0	–	3	–	0	2	–	5	–	1
$ – Conference champion

The 1941 Pacific Tigers football team represented the College of the Pacific—now known as the University of the Pacific—in Stockton, California as a member of the Far Western Conference (FWC) during the 1941 college football season. Led by ninth-year head coach Amos Alonzo Stagg, Pacific compiled an overall record of 4–7 with a mark of 3–0 in conference play, winning the FWC title. The team was outscored by its opponents 100 to 72 for the season. The Tigers played home games at Baxter Stadium in Stockton.

During a September 24 game against Hawaii in Stockton, a distressed army flying cadet tried to land his plane at the stadium, diving for 30 minutes "a few feet over the heads of terrified spectators and players and clipped the stadium power line, darkening the field." The cadet ultimately landed his plane safely in the stadium parking lot.

Pacific was ranked at No. 199 (out of 681 teams) in the final rankings under the Litkenhous Difference by Score System.

== Schedule ==
Date	Opponent	Site	Result	Attendance	Source
September 24	Hawaii*	Baxter Stadium; Stockton, CA	L 0–14	12,000	
October 3	Chico State	Baxter Stadium; Stockton, CA	W 7–0		
October 11	vs. SMU*	Tyler, TX (Rose Festival game)	L 0–34	12,500	
October 17	Cal Aggies	Baxter Stadium; Stockton, CA	W 7–0		
October 24	San Jose State*^{†}	Baxter Stadium; Stockton, CA (rivalry)	L 0–7		
November 1	Humboldt State	Baxter Stadium; Stockton, CA	W 19–0		
November 11	at Fresno State*	Ratcliffe Stadium; Fresno, CA	L 0–13	13,000	
November 19	at Santa Barbara State*	La Playa Stadium; Santa Barbara, CA	L 6–7		
November 26	California JV*	Baxter Stadium; Stockton, CA	W 20–0		
November 29	at Pacific Lutheran*	Tacoma, WA	L 7–13		
December 5	at San Diego State*	Balboa Stadium; San Diego, CA	L 6–12	9,000	
*Non-conference game; ^{†}Homecoming
