= 1941 Gonzaga Bulldogs football team =

American college football season

1941 Gonzaga Bulldogs football
- Conference: Independent
- Record: 3–7
- Head coach: Puggy Hunton (3rd season)
- Home stadium: Gonzaga Stadium

1941 Western college football independents records
	Conf.			Overall
Team	W	L	T	W		L		T
Hawaii		–		8	–	1	–	0
Santa Clara		–		6	–	3	–	0
San Francisco		–		6	–	4	–	0
Idaho Southern Branch		–		5	–	1	–	2
Cal Poly		–		5	–	3	–	1
Saint Mary's		–		5	–	4	–	0
Loyola (CA)		–		5	–	5	–	0
Nevada		–		3	–	5	–	1
Portland		–		3	–	5	–	0
Gonzaga		–		3	–	7	–	0
San Francisco State		–		2	–	4	–	1
Humboldt State		–		2	–	5	–	1
La Verne		–		0	–	6	–	0

The 1941 Gonzaga Bulldogs football team was an American football team that represented Gonzaga University during the 1941 college football season. They played their home games on campus at Gonzaga Stadium in Spokane, Washington. In their third year under head coach Puggy Hunton, the Bulldogs compiled a 3–7 record and were outscored by their opponents by a total of 201 to 65.

The season ended with a blowout home loss to Washington State on November 22, two weeks before the Attack on Pearl Harbor. In April 1942, university president Father Leo J. Robinson announced that Gonzaga was suspending its intercollegiate football program for the duration of World War II. Robinson stated the loss of numerous football players and prospect to military service made further competition impossible. The program had been in financial difficulty, and varsity football was not resumed after the war.

Gonzaga's decision to cease competition in intercollegiate football began a trend among Catholic universities during the war and immediate post-war years to terminate their football programs. Gonzaga would be followed by Providence (1941); Creighton (1942); Manhattan (1942); Saint Louis (1949); Portland (1949); Saint Mary's (1950); (Note: Saint Mary's did make a comeback to football at "College Division" (ancestor of NCAA Division II and III) level between 1959 and 1992, and would play as an independent in NCAA division I-AA (ancestor of today's Football Championship Subdivision) between 1993 and 2003, before dropping football again after 2003.) Mount St. Mary's (1950); Niagara (1950); Loyola (1951); San Francisco (1951); (Note: San Francisco did make a comeback to football at "College Division" level between 1959 and 1982, but has not fielded a varsity football team since 1983.) St. Bonaventure (1951) and Santa Clara (1952). (Note: Santa Clara did make a comeback to football at "College Division" level between 1959 and 1992, but has not fielded a varsity football team since 1993.)

== Schedule ==
Date	Opponent	Site	Result	Attendance	Source
September 19 (Note: Friday night)	Arizona State	Gonzaga Stadium; Spokane, WA	L 0–6		
September 26	at Pacific Lutheran	Tacoma Stadium; Tacoma, WA	L 13–26	22,000	
October 3	at College of Idaho	Nampa, ID; Lettuce Bowl	W 14–0	5,000	
October 10	Idaho	Gonzaga Stadium; Spokane, WA (rivalry)	L 7–21	6,000	
October 18	at Montana	Dornblaser Field; Missoula, MT	L 6–13		
October 26 (Note: Sunday)	Portland	Gonzaga Stadium; Spokane, WA	W 19–13	2,500	
November 2	at Saint Mary's	Kezar Stadium; San Francisco, CA	L 0–26	875	
November 8	Eastern Washington	Gonzaga Stadium; Spokane, WA	W 6–0	2,000	
November 16	at Portland	Multnomah Stadium; Portland, OR	L 0–37		
November 22	Washington State	Gonzaga Stadium; Spokane, WA	L 0–59	6,000	
