= 1941 Cal Poly Mustangs football team =

American college football season

1941 Cal Poly Mustangs football
- Conference: Independent
- Record: 5–3–1
- Head coach: Howie O'Daniels (9th season)
- Home stadium: Mustang Stadium

1941 Western college football independents records
	Conf.			Overall
Team	W	L	T	W		L		T
Hawaii		–		8	–	1	–	0
Santa Clara		–		6	–	3	–	0
San Francisco		–		6	–	4	–	0
Idaho Southern Branch		–		5	–	1	–	2
Cal Poly		–		5	–	3	–	1
Saint Mary's		–		5	–	4	–	0
Loyola (CA)		–		5	–	5	–	0
Nevada		–		3	–	5	–	1
Portland		–		3	–	5	–	0
Gonzaga		–		3	–	7	–	0
San Francisco State		–		2	–	4	–	1
Humboldt State		–		2	–	5	–	1
La Verne		–		0	–	6	–	0

The 1941 Cal Poly Mustangs football team represented California Polytechnic School—now known as California Polytechnic State University, San Luis Obispo—as an independent during the 1941 college football season. Led by ninth-year head coach Howie O'Daniels, Cal Poly compiled a record of 5–3–1. The team outscored its opponents 84 to 72 for the season. The Mustangs played home games at Mustang Stadium in San Luis Obispo, California.

== Schedule ==
Date	Opponent	Site	Result	Source
September 20	at Whittier	Hadley Field; Whittier, CA	W 10–7	
September 27	at Nevada	Mackay Stadium (Note: This stadium is the predecessor to the current Mackay Stadium, which was opened for the 1966 season.); Reno, NV	L 0–32	
October 4	Caltech	Mustang Stadium; San Luis Obispo, CA	W 18–0	
October 11	at Chico State	University Stadium; Chico, CA	T 0–0	
October 17	La Verne	Mustang Stadium; San Luis Obispo, CA	W 14–0	
October 24	California JV (Note: The University of California JV team was commonly known as the "Cal Ramblers")	Mustang Stadium; San Luis Obispo, CA	L 14–26	
October 31	San Francisco State	Mustang Stadium; San Luis Obispo, CA	W 14–0	
November 8	Humboldt State	Mustang Stadium; San Luis Obispo, CA	L 0–7	
November 11	160th Infantry (Camp SLO)	Mustang Stadium; San Luis Obispo, CA	W 14–0	
