= 1941 St. Cloud State Huskies football team =

American college football season

1941 St. Cloud State Huskies football
- St. Cloud's all-conference stars: Filippi, Shew, Teas, Bierhaus, Zakariasen

NTCC champion
- Conference: Northern Teachers College Conference
- Record: 7–0 (4–0 NTCC)
- Head coach: Warren Kasch (7th season)
- Captains: Don Klein; Earl Teas

1941 Northern Teachers College Conference football standings
	Conf.					Overall
Team	W		L		T	W		L		T
St. Cloud State $	4	–	0	–	0	7	–	0	–	0
Mankato State	3	–	1	–	1	3	–	4	–	1
Bemidji State	3	–	2	–	0	6	–	2	–	0
Winona State	1	–	2	–	1	1	–	4	–	1
Duluth State	1	–	4	–	0	1	–	6	–	1
Moorhead State	0	–	3	–	0	0	–	7	–	0
$ – Conference champion

The 1941 St. Cloud State Huskies football team was an American football team that represented St. Cloud State Teachers College (later renamed St. Cloud State University) as a member of the Northern Teachers College Conference (NTCC) during the 1941 college football season. In their seventh year under head coach Warren Kasch, the Huskies compiled a perfect 7–0 record (4–0 in NTCC games), won the NTCC championship, shut out five of seven opponents, and outscored opponents by a total of 108 to 21.

Left halfback Louis Filippi was selected as the most valuable player in the NTCC. Five St. Cloud players received all-conference honors: Filippi; quarterback Fritz Bierhaus; guards Earl Teas and Harvey Shew; and tackle Ken Zakariasen. Teas and Don Klein were the team captains.

== Schedule ==
Date	Opponent	Site	Result	Source
September 20	Saint John's (MN)*	St. Cloud, MN	W 6–0	
September 26	at Eau Claire State*	Eau Claire, WI	W 22–0	
October 4	Duluth State	St. Cloud, MN	W 13–0	
October 11	at Mankato State	Mankato, MN	W 12–7	
October 18	Winona State^{†}	St. Cloud, MN	W 14–0	
October 25	Stevens Point*	St. Cloud, MN	W 20–14	
October 31	at Bemidji State	Bemidji, MN	W 21–0	
*Non-conference game; ^{†}Homecoming

== Game summaries ==
=== Stevens Point ===
On October 25, St. Cloud won its sixth game, defeating Stevens Point, 20–14, in a non-conference game in St. Cloud. The St. Cloud Times wrote that halfback Louis Filippi played like a jackrabbit who "danced circles around the big but slow Pointers as he galloped for gain after gain". St. Cloud out-gained Stevens Point by 242 rushing yards to 45 and had 16 first downs to five for Stevens Point. St. Cloud attempted only five pases, completing two. Both of Stevens Point's touchdowns resulted from fumbles on St. Cloud's 11-yard line.

=== Bemidji State ===
On October 31, St. Cloud concluded its season with a 21–0 road victory against Bemidji State at Bemidji, Minnesota. Co-captain Don Klein scored St. Cloud's first touchdown in the second quarter. Co-captain Earl Teas kicked the estra point. in the fourth quarter, St. Cloud recovered a Bemidji fumble at the Bemidji 35-yard line and drove to the three-yard line where Fritz Bierhause scored on a quarterback sneak. Teas again kicked the extra point. With the victory, St. Cloud won its second consecutive conference championship and its fourth in seven years.

== Personnel ==
=== Players ===
- Fritz Bierhaus, Brainerd
- Lester Blume, Osakis
- Edward Eggers, New Ulm
- Louis Filippi, Keewatin
- Bob Gray, Stacy
- Henry Hambrecht, New Ulm
- Henry Hammer, Granite Falls
- Jim Hills, Clarissa
- Wilbur Kessler, Minneapolis
- Don Klein, St. Cloud, co-captain
- Ambrose Kramer, Osakis
- Ted Kruger, Redwood Falls
- Ken Lindholm, Princeton
- Jerome Marsolek, Royalton
- Marv Mathre, Glenwood
- Jerome McCarthy, St Cloud
- Bob Miller, St. Cloud
- Ralph Pearson, Minneapolis
- Don Renn, St. Cloud
- Jim Roes, Wadena
- Harvey Shew, Brainerd
- Earl Teas, Watertown, co-captain
- Bud Whelan, Minneapolis
- Stanton Williams, Clear Lake
- Ken Zakariasen, Excelsior

=== Staff ===
- Warren Kasch, head coach
- Edward Coletti, assistant coach
- Winfield Pehrson, trainer
- A.S. Mathiasen, bus driver
