= 1941 South Dakota State Jackrabbits football team =

American college football season

1941 South Dakota State Jackrabbits football
- Conference: North Central Conference
- Record: 2–5 (1–5 NCC)
- Head coach: Thurlo McCrady (1st season)

1941 North Central Conference football standings
	Conf.					Overall
Team	W		L		T	W		L		T
Iowa State Teachers $	5	–	0	–	0	5	–	3	–	0
South Dakota	4	–	1	–	0	6	–	2	–	0
North Dakota	3	–	1	–	0	4	–	5	–	0
Omaha	2	–	3	–	0	3	–	4	–	1
North Dakota Agricultural	2	–	4	–	0	2	–	7	–	0
Morningside	1	–	4	–	0	3	–	5	–	0
South Dakota State	1	–	5	–	0	2	–	5	–	0
$ – Conference champion

The 1941 South Dakota State Jackrabbits football team was an American football team that represented South Dakota State University in the North Central Conference during the 1941 college football season. In its first season under head coach Thurlo McCrady, the team compiled a 2–5 record and was outscored by a total of 131 to 32.

Guard Leon Anderson was the team captain. He was also selected by the college sports editors to the 1941 All-North Central Conference football team.

== Schedule ==
Date	Opponent	Site	Result	Source
September 20	Northern Normal*	Brookings, SD	W 14–0	
September 27	Iowa State Teachers	Brookings, SD	L 0–21	
October 4	at Omaha	Omaha, NE	L 0–12	
October 11	at North Dakota Agricultural	Dacotah Field; Fargo, ND (rivalry)	L 0–25	
October 18	North Dakota^{†}	Brookings, SD	L 15–33	
October 25	at South Dakota	Inman Field; Vermillion, SD (rivalry)	L 0–40	
November 8	Morningside	Brookings, SD	W 3–0	
*Non-conference game; ^{†}Homecoming
