= 1941 Cal Aggies football team =

American college football season

1941 Cal Aggies football
- Conference: Far Western Conference
- Record: 2–2–4 (2–1 FWC)
- Head coach: Vern Hickey (5th season)
- Captain: Mitsuo Nitta
- Home stadium: A Street field

1941 Far Western Conference football standings
	Conf.					Overall
Team	W		L		T	W		L		T
Pacific (CA) $	3	–	0	–	0	4	–	7	–	0
Cal Aggies	2	–	1	–	0	2	–	2	–	4
Chico State	1	–	2	–	0	1	–	5	–	2
Humboldt State	0	–	3	–	0	2	–	5	–	1
$ – Conference champion

The 1941 Cal Aggies football team represented the College of Agriculture at Davis—now known as the University of California, Davis—as a member of the Far Western Conference (FWC) during the 1941 college football season. Led by foifth-year head coach Vern Hickey, the Aggies compiled an overall record of 2–2–4 with a mark of 2–1 in conference play, placing second in the FWC. The team outscored its opponents 61 to 47 for the season. They scored more than ten points just twice and allowed double digits only once.

The Cal Aggies were ranked at No. 227 (out of 681 teams) in the final rankings under the Litkenhous Difference by Score System.

The Cal Aggies played home games at A Street field on campus in Davis, California.

== Schedule ==
Date	Opponent	Site	Result
September 27	California JV (Note: The University of California JV team was commonly known as the "Cal Ramblers".)*	A Street field; Davis, CA	T 7–7
October 3	at Whittier*	Hadley Field; Whittier, CA	L 0–7
October 11	Humboldt State	A Street field; Davis, CA	W 21–0
October 17	at Pacific (CA)	Baxter Stadium; Stockton, CA	L 0–7
October 25	Chico State	A Street field; Davis, CA	W 7–0
November 1	Occidental*	A Street field; Davis, CA	T 6–6
November 8	at Santa Barbara State*	La Playa Stadium; Santa Barbara, CA	T 6–6
November 15	Nevada*	A Street field; Davis, CA	T 14–14
*Non-conference game
