= 1941 Idaho Southern Branch Bengals football team =

American college football season

1941 Idaho Southern Branch Bengals football
- Conference: Independent
- Record: 3–5
- Head coach: John Vesser (1st season)
- Captain: Dale Dykman (Note: Dykman was inducted to Idaho State's athletic hall of fame in 1994; he is listed on the school's website as "A. Dale Dykeman".)
- Home stadium: Spud Bowl

1941 Western college football independents records
	Conf.			Overall
Team	W	L	T	W		L		T
Hawaii		–		8	–	1	–	0
Santa Clara		–		6	–	3	–	0
San Francisco		–		6	–	4	–	0
Idaho Southern Branch		–		5	–	1	–	2
Cal Poly		–		5	–	3	–	1
Saint Mary's		–		5	–	4	–	0
Loyola (CA)		–		5	–	5	–	0
Nevada		–		3	–	5	–	1
Portland		–		3	–	5	–	0
Gonzaga		–		3	–	7	–	0
San Francisco State		–		2	–	4	–	1
Humboldt State		–		2	–	5	–	1
La Verne		–		0	–	6	–	0

The 1941 Idaho Southern Branch Bengals football team was an American football team that represented the University of Idaho, Southern Branch (later renamed Idaho State University) as an independent during the 1941 college football season. In their first season under head coach John Vesser, the team compiled a 5–1–2 record and outscored their opponents by a total of 138 to 53.

== Schedule ==
Date	Opponent	Site	Result	Attendance	Source
September 27 (Note: The September 27 game was played in rain; some sources give a September 26 date for this game.)	at Omaha	Omaha, NE	T 0–0		
October 11	at Western State (CO)	Gunnison, CO	W 13–6		
October 17 (Note: Some sources give an October 18 date for this game.)	College of Idaho	Spud Bowl; Pocatello, ID	L 6–14		
October 24	at Boise	College Field; Boise, ID	W 34–0		
November 1	Albion Normal (Note: Albion Normal is listed in some sources as Southern Idaho, a name adopted in 1947.)	Spud Bowl; Pocatello, ID	W 20–13		
November 7	Weber	Spud Bowl; Pocatello, ID	W 39–7		
November 11	Montana State^{†}	Spud Bowl; Pocatello, ID	T 13–13		
November 20 (Note: The November 20 game was played in snow.)	Chaffey	Spud Bowl; Pocatello, ID	W 13–0		
^{†}Homecoming
