= Dick Weisgerber =

American football player (1915–1984)

No. 33
- Position: Back

Personal information
- Born: February 19, 1915; Kearny, New Jersey, U.S.
- Died: June 1, 1984 (aged 69); Sturgeon Bay, Wisconsin, U.S.
- Listed height: 5 ft 10 in (1.78 m)
- Listed weight: 200 lb (91 kg)

Career information
- College: Willamette

Career history
- Green Bay Packers (1938–1940, 1942)

Awards and highlights
- NFL champion (1939)

Career statistics
- Rushing attempts: 11
- Rushing yards: 34
- Receptions: 1
- Receiving yards: 37
- Stats at Pro Football Reference

Richard Arthur Weisgerber (February 19, 1915 – June 1, 1984) was a player in the National Football League (NFL). He played four seasons with the Green Bay Packers.

Born in Kearny, New Jersey, Weisgerber was raised in Newark and played high school football at Saint Benedict's Prep School, earning grades sufficient to be admitted to Oregon's Willamette College (now known as Willamette University).

Willamette coach Spec Keene used Weisgerber as a defensive back, fullback and kicker, leading the nation in extras points as a freshman in 1934. With 13 touchdowns (including two touchdowns scored in the final game of the season on Thanksgiving Day against Whitman College), 14 extra points and two field goals, Weisgerber scored a total of 98 points in his 10 games played during the 1936 collegiate football season for Willamette, the second-most of any player in the nation behind Norman Schoen of Baldwin Wallace University, who scored 117 points—primarily on 19 touchdowns—in an eight-game schedule on a team that led the nation with 330 points scored.

Weisgerber joined the Packers for the 1938 season and played on the team that won the 1939 NFL Championship Game against the New York Giants, avenging a loss in the previous year's title game. In his four seasons with the Packers, Weisgerber played 27 games (seven of them as a starter) and had a career record of 34 rushing yards on 11 carries, a single reception for 27 yards, four interceptions and made both of the extra points he attempted.

During the 1941 season, Weisgerber return to Willamette, where he became an assistant coach to Spec Keene. The team finished the season with an 8–2 record, including five wins against the teams in the Northwestern Conference, where Willamette outscored their opponents by a 218–7 margin. At the conclusion of the season the team sailed to Hawaii, where they lost to the Hawaii team by a score of 20–6 in a game played on December 6 in front of a crowd of 24,000 spectators. While waiting in front of their hotel the next morning waiting to do some sightseeing, the team found themselves in the middle of the Japanese Attack on Pearl Harbor. They spent the subsequent 10 days after the attack laying barbed wire and were given rifles to guard against a Japanese invasion, before being first able to leave the island on December 19 to return to the mainland.

He played for the Packers in the 1942 season and then enlisted in the military, where a service-related injury prevented him from resuming his football career when he returned to civilian life after World War II.

Weisgerber died at the age of 69 on June 1, 1984, in Sturgeon Bay, Wisconsin.
