= 1941 Humboldt State Lumberjacks football team =

American college football season

1941 Humboldt State Lumberjacks football
- Conference: Independent
- Record: 2–5–1
- Head coach: Earl Hoos (1st season)
- Home stadium: Albee Stadium

1941 Western college football independents records
	Conf.			Overall
Team	W	L	T	W		L		T
Hawaii		–		8	–	1	–	0
Santa Clara		–		6	–	3	–	0
San Francisco		–		6	–	4	–	0
Idaho Southern Branch		–		5	–	1	–	2
Cal Poly		–		5	–	3	–	1
Saint Mary's		–		5	–	4	–	0
Loyola (CA)		–		5	–	5	–	0
Nevada		–		3	–	5	–	1
Portland		–		3	–	5	–	0
Gonzaga		–		3	–	7	–	0
San Francisco State		–		2	–	4	–	1
Humboldt State		–		2	–	5	–	1
La Verne		–		0	–	6	–	0

The 1941 Humboldt State Lumberjacks football team represented Humboldt State College—now known as California State Polytechnic University, Humboldt—as an independent during the 1941 college football season. Led by Earl Hoos in his first and only season as head coach, the Lumberjacks compiled a record of 2–5–1 and were outscored by their opponents 115 to 46 for the season. The team played home games at Albee Stadium in Eureka, California.

This was the last team Humboldt State fielded until 1946 when the Lumberjacks became a member of the Far Western Conference (FWC) as of the 1946 season.

== Schedule ==
Date	Opponent	Site	Result	Source
September 27	San Francisco State	Albee Stadium; Eureka, CA	W 14–2	
October 5	Saint Mary's freshmen	Albee Stadium; Eureka, CA	L 6–35	
October 10	at Cal Aggies	A Street Field; Davis, CA	L 0–21	
October 18	Chico State	Albee Stadium; Eureka, CA	L 6–13	
October 26	Santa Clara freshmen	Albee Stadium; Eureka, CA	L 6–18	
November 1	at Pacific (CA)	Baxter Stadium; Stockton, CA	L 0–19	
November 8	at Cal Poly	Mustang Stadium; San Luis Obispo, CA	W 7–0	
November 14	Compton	Albee Stadium; Eureka, CA	T 7–7	
