= 1941 Nevada Wolf Pack football team =

American college football season

1941 Nevada Wolf Pack football
- Conference: Independent
- Record: 3–5–1
- Head coach: Jim Aiken (3rd season)
- Home stadium: Mackay Field

1941 Western college football independents records
	Conf.			Overall
Team	W	L	T	W		L		T
Hawaii		–		8	–	1	–	0
Santa Clara		–		6	–	3	–	0
San Francisco		–		6	–	4	–	0
Idaho Southern Branch		–		5	–	1	–	2
Cal Poly		–		5	–	3	–	1
Saint Mary's		–		5	–	4	–	0
Loyola (CA)		–		5	–	5	–	0
Nevada		–		3	–	5	–	1
Portland		–		3	–	5	–	0
Gonzaga		–		3	–	7	–	0
San Francisco State		–		2	–	4	–	1
Humboldt State		–		2	–	5	–	1
La Verne		–		0	–	6	–	0

The 1941 Nevada Wolf Pack football team was an American football team that represented the University of Nevada as an independent during the 1941 college football season. In their third season under head coach Jim Aiken, the team compiled a 3–5–1 record. The team was invited to play in a post-season game in Honolulu on New Year's Day, but athletic events in the Territory of Hawaii were cancelled after the Attack on Pearl Harbor.

Marion Motley, who was later inducted into the Pro Football Hall of Fame, played for the Wolf Pack from 1941 to 1943.

Nevada was ranked at No. 159 (out of 681 teams) in the final rankings under the Litkenhous Difference by Score System.

== Schedule ==
Date	Opponent	Site	Result	Attendance	Source
September 27	Cal Poly	Mackay Field; Reno, NV	W 32–0		
October 3	at San Francisco	Seals Stadium; San Francisco, CA	L 3–7	6,000	
October 11	at Arizona	Arizona Stadium; Tucson, AZ	L 7–26	9,000	
October 18	Fresno State^{†}	Mackay Field; Reno, NV	L 3–6		
October 25	Santa Barbara State	Mackay Field; Reno, NV	W 7–0		
November 1	at New Mexico	Albuquerque, NM	L 7–26		
November 8	San Jose State	Mackay Field; Reno, NV	W 21–19	3,000	
November 15	at Cal Aggies	A Street Field; Davis, CA	T 14–14	1,200	
November 30	Loyola (CA)	Gilmore Stadium; Los Angeles, CA	L 7–19	8,000	
January 1, 1942	Hawaii	Honolulu Stadium; Honolulu, Territory of Hawaii	No contest		
^{†}Homecoming
