= 1941 North Dakota Fighting Sioux football team =

American college football season

1941 North Dakota Fighting Sioux football
- Conference: North Central Conference
- Record: 4–5 (3–1 NCC)
- Head coach: Charles A. West (14th season)
- Captains: Rob Ballinger; Walt Dobler; Gene Freeze; Wallace Olson; Al Simpson; Jack Whillans
- Home stadium: Memorial Stadium

1941 North Central Conference football standings
	Conf.					Overall
Team	W		L		T	W		L		T
Iowa State Teachers $	5	–	0	–	0	5	–	3	–	0
South Dakota	4	–	1	–	0	6	–	2	–	0
North Dakota	3	–	1	–	0	4	–	5	–	0
Omaha	2	–	3	–	0	3	–	4	–	1
North Dakota Agricultural	2	–	4	–	0	2	–	7	–	0
Morningside	1	–	4	–	0	3	–	5	–	0
South Dakota State	1	–	5	–	0	2	–	5	–	0
$ – Conference champion

The 1941 North Dakota Fighting Sioux football team was an American football team that represented University of North Dakota in North Central Conference (NCC) during the 1941 college football season. In its 14th season under head coach Charles A. West, the team compiled a 4–5 record (3–1 against NCC opponents), tied for fourth place in the NCC, and was outscored by a total of 145 to 110. The team played its home games at Memorial Stadium in Grand Forks, North Dakota.

End Al Simmons was selected by the college sports editors to the 1941 All-North Central Conference football team.

North Dakota was ranked at No. 234 (out of 681 teams) in the final rankings under the Litkenhous Difference by Score System.

== Schedule ==
Date	Opponent	Site	Result	Attendance	Source
September 19	at St. Thomas (MN)*	Saint Paul, MN	L 0–6		
September 26	Luther*	Memorial Stadium; Grand Forks, ND	W 20–7		
October 4	at Iowa State Teachers	O. R. Latham Stadium; Cedar Falls, IA	L 10–32		
October 11	South Dakota	Memorial Stadium; Grand Forks, ND (rivalry)	W 14–7		
October 18	at South Dakota State	Brookings, SD	W 33–15		
October 25	North Dakota Agricultural^{†}	Memorial Stadium; Grand Forks, ND (Nickel Trophy)	W 20–6		
November 1	Bradley*	Memorial Stadium; Grand Forks, ND	L 7–19		
November 8	at Montana*	Dornblaser Field; Missoula, MT	L 6–13		
November 13	at Dayton*	Dayton Stadium; Dayton, OH	L 0–40	5,000	
*Non-conference game; ^{†}Homecoming
