= 1941 South Dakota Coyotes football team =

American college football season

1941 South Dakota Coyotes football
- Conference: North Central Conference
- Record: 6–2 (4–1 NCC)
- Head coach: Harry Gamage (8th season)
- Home stadium: Inman Field

1941 North Central Conference football standings
	Conf.					Overall
Team	W		L		T	W		L		T
Iowa State Teachers $	5	–	0	–	0	5	–	3	–	0
South Dakota	4	–	1	–	0	6	–	2	–	0
North Dakota	3	–	1	–	0	4	–	5	–	0
Omaha	2	–	3	–	0	3	–	4	–	1
North Dakota Agricultural	2	–	4	–	0	2	–	7	–	0
Morningside	1	–	4	–	0	3	–	5	–	0
South Dakota State	1	–	5	–	0	2	–	5	–	0
$ – Conference champion

The 1941 South Dakota Coyotes football team was an American football team that represented the University of South Dakota in the North Central Conference (NCC) during the 1941 college football season. In its eighth season under head coach Harry Gamage, the team compiled a 6–2 record (4–1 against NCC opponents), finished second in the conference, and outscored opponents by a total of 159 to 66.

The team played its home games at Inman Field in Vermillion, South Dakota.

Four South Dakota players were selected by the college sports editors to the 1941 All-North Central Conference football team: end Ole Solberg, tackle Ed Petranek, quarterback Bob Burns, and fullback Don Forney.

== Schedule ==
Date	Opponent	Site	Result	Attendance	Source
September 27	Wayne Normal (NE)*	Inman Field; Vermillion, SD	W 13–0		
October 3	at Augustana (SD)*	Augustana College Stadium; Sioux Falls, SD	W 26–6	4,500	
October 11	at North Dakota	Memorial Stadium; Grand Forks, ND (rivalry)	L 7–14		
October 18	at Morningside	Yards Park; Sioux City, IA	W 26–12		
October 25	South Dakota State	Inman Field; Vermillion, SD	W 40–0		
November 1	at Iowa State*	Clyde Williams Field; Ames, IA	L 0–27		
November 8	Omaha	Inman Field; Vermillion, SD	W 28–7		
November 15	North Dakota Agricultural	Inman Field; Vermillion, SD	W 19–0		
*Non-conference game
