= Elmer Madarik =

American football player (1922–1974)

No. 29, 40, 30, 23
- Position: Back

Personal information
- Born: July 15, 1922; Joliet, Illinois, U.S.
- Died: February 3, 1974 (aged 51)
- Listed height: 5 ft 11 in (1.80 m)
- Listed weight: 200 lb (91 kg)

Career information
- High school: Joliet Catholic Academy
- College: Detroit Mercy (1940-1942)
- NFL draft: 1944: 18th round, 178th overall pick

Career history
- Detroit Lions (1945–1948); Washington Redskins (1948)

Career NFL statistics
- Rushing yards: 48
- Rushing average: 1.5
- Receptions: 10
- Receiving yards: 113
- Total touchdowns: 1
- Stats at Pro Football Reference

Elmer Laurence Madarik (July 15, 1922 – February 3, 1974) was an American professional football running back in the National Football League (NFL) for the Detroit Lions and Washington Redskins. He played college football at the University of Detroit Mercy and was drafted in the 18th round of the 1944 NFL draft.
