= Winston Siegfried =

American football coach (1916–2006)

Biographical details
- Born: December 2, 1916; Richmond, Virginia, U.S.
- Died: January 26, 2006 (aged 89); Lake Wales, Florida, U.S.

Coaching career (HC unless noted)
- 1969–1970: Apprentice

Head coaching record
- Overall: 5–10

Winston Thomas Siegfried (December 2, 1916 – January 26, 2006) was an American football coach. He was the 24th head football coach at The Apprentice School in Newport News, Virginia and he held that position for two seasons, from 1969 until 1970. His coaching record at Apprentice was 5–10.
