= 1941 West Texas State Buffaloes football team =

American college football season

1941 West Texas State Buffaloes football
- Conference: Border Conference
- Record: 8–2 (4–1 Border)
- Head coach: Jack Curtice (2nd season)
- Home stadium: Buffalo Stadium

1941 Border Conference football standings
	Conf.					Overall
Team	W		L		T	W		L		T
Arizona $	5	–	0	–	0	7	–	3	–	0
Texas Tech	2	–	0	–	0	9	–	2	–	0
West Texas State	4	–	1	–	0	8	–	2	–	0
Hardin–Simmons	3	–	1	–	0	7	–	3	–	1
New Mexico	3	–	2	–	1	5	–	4	–	1
Texas Mines	3	–	4	–	0	4	–	5	–	1
Arizona State	2	–	4	–	1	5	–	1	–	1
Arizona State–Flagstaff	1	–	5	–	0	3	–	5	–	0
New Mexico A&M	0	–	6	–	0	2	–	7	–	0
$ – Conference champion

The 1941 West Texas State Buffaloes football team was an American football team that represented West Texas State College (now known as West Texas A&M University) in the Border Conference during the 1941 college football season. In its second season under head coach Jack Curtice, the team compiled an 8–2 record (4–1 against conference opponents), finished in third place in the conference, and outscored all opponents by a total of 298 to 100. The 1941 season was the first for West Texas as a member of the Border Conference. The team played its home games at Buffalo Stadium in Canyon, Texas.

The team averaged 29.8 points per game. The team was led by halfback Ben Collins who was one of the nation's leading scorers. Collins and fullback Larry Sanders were selected by the conference coaches as first-team players on the 1941 All-Border Conference football team. Tackle Cletus Kuehler and guard Jold Farbus were named to the second team.

West Texas was ranked at No. 91 (out of 681 teams) in the final rankings under the Litkenhous Difference by Score System for 1941.

== Schedule ==
Date	Opponent	Site	Result	Attendance	Source
September 18	Oklahoma City*	Buffalo Stadium; Canyon, TX	W 34–0		
September 27	at Fresno State*	Ratcliffe Stadium; Fresno, CA	W 7–6	11,000	
October 4	at Arizona State	Goodwin Stadium; Tempe, AZ	W 13–7	4,500	
October 11	New Mexico A&M	Buffalo Stadium; Canyon, TX	W 51–0		
October 18	Western State (CO)*	Buffalo Stadium; Canyon, TX	W 66–0		
October 25	at Arizona State–Flagstaff	Buffalo Stadium; Flagstaff, AZ	W 27–0		
November 1	at Hardin–Simmons	Abilene, TX	L 13–20	4,000	
November 8	St. Mary's (TX)*^{†}	Buffalo Stadium; Canyon, TX	W 40–21	6,000	
November 15	at Texas Mines	Kidd Field; El Paso, TX	W 40–7	4,000	
November 22	at Texas A&I*	Kingsville, TX	L 7–39		
*Non-conference game; ^{†}Homecoming
