= Frank Bridges =

American sports coach (1890–1970)

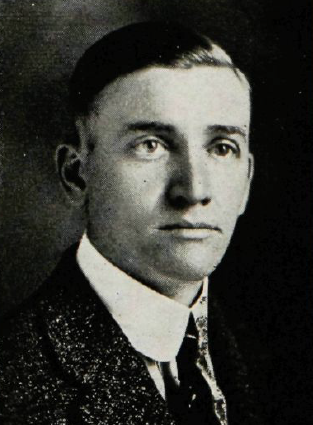
- Bridges pictured in The Round-Up 1921, Baylor yearbook

Biographical details
- Born: July 4, 1890; Savannah, Georgia, U.S.
- Died: June 10, 1970 (aged 79); San Antonio, Texas, U.S.

Coaching career (HC unless noted)

Football
- 1919: Fort Smith HS (AK)
- 1920–1925: Baylor
- 1927–1929: Simmons (TX)
- 1933–1934: Texas Military College
- 1935–1939: St. Mary's (TX)
- 1943: Brooklyn Dodgers (assistant)
- 1944: Brooklyn Tigers

Basketball
- 1911–1916: Columbus YMCA
- 1920–1926: Baylor
- 1927–1929: Simmons (TX)
- ?–1935: Texas Military College
- 1935–1939: St. Mary's (TX)

Baseball
- 1920–1927: Baylor
- 1938: St. Mary's (TX)

Administrative career (AD unless noted)
- 1920–1926: Baylor
- 1932–1935: Texas Military College

Head coaching record
- Overall: 82–53–17 (college football); 102–137 (college basketball); 95–73 (college baseball, excluding St. Mary's); 0–5 (NFL); 12–6–2 (junior college football)

Accomplishments and honors

Championships
- Football; 2 SWC (1922, 1924); 1 CTC (1933) Basketball; 1 Alamo regular season (1938) Baseball; 1 SWC (1923)

Frank Bogart Bridges Sr. (July 4, 1890 – June 10, 1970) was an American football, basketball, and baseball coach. He served as the head football coach at Baylor University from 1920 to 1925, Simmons University—now known as Hardin–Simmons University—from 1927 to 1929, and St. Mary's University in San Antonio, Texas from 1935 to 1939. Bridges was also the head basketball coach at Baylor from 1920 to 1926, at Simmons from 1927 to 1929, and at St. Mary's from 1935 to 1939, tallying a career college basketball mark of 102–137. In addition, he was Baylor's head baseball coach from 1920 to 1927, amassing a record of 95–73, and the head baseball coach at St. Mary's in 1938. 1944, Bridges served as the co-head coach with Pete Cawthon and Ed Kubale for the Brooklyn Tigers of the National Football League (NFL). He graduated from Harvard University.

== Coaching career ==
From 1911 to 1916, Bridges coached the YMCA basketball team in Columbus, Georgia, then "the cradle of basketball in Georgia." In 1919, he coached high school football in Fort Smith, Arkansas.

During his tenure as head football coach at Baylor University, Bridges compiled a 35–18–6 record. His winning percentage of .644 ranks third in school history, behind R. H. Hamilton (.786) and Bob Woodruff (.645). In 1921 and 1922, he led the Bears to consecutive eight-win seasons. Bridges won the school's first two Southwest Conference (SWC) championships, in 1922 and 1924. Baylor did not win another until 1974. From 1927 to 1929, he coached at Hardin–Simmons University where he posted a 16–13–4 record.

Bridges referred basketball games in the Southwest Conference during the 1931–32 season. In the spring of 1932, he was hired as the athletic director at Texas Military College in Terrell, Texas. Bridges also coached football and basketball at Texas Military College, lead the football team to a Central Texas Conference (CTC) championship in 1933.

== Death ==
Bridges died on June 10, 1970, at a nursing home in San Antonio.

== Head coaching record ==
=== College football ===
Year	Team	Overall	Conference	Standing	Bowl/playoffs
Baylor Bears (Southwest Conference) (1920–1925)
1920	Baylor	4–4–1	1–2–1	5th	
1921	Baylor	8–3	2–2	4th	
1922	Baylor	8–3	5–0	1st	
1923	Baylor	5–1–2	1–1–2	T–4th	
1924	Baylor	7–2–1	4–0–1	1st	
1925	Baylor	3–5–2	0–3–2	7th	
Baylor:		35–18–6	13–8–6		
Simmons Cowboys (Texas Conference) (1927–1929)
1927	Simmons	5–3–2	2–1–2	2nd	
1928	Simmons	6–6–1	2–3	T–4th	
1929	Simmons	5–4–1	1–3–1	T–4th	
Simmons:		16–13–4	5–7–3		
St. Mary's Rattlers (Independent) (1935)
1935	St. Mary's	6–4–1			
St. Mary's Rattlers (Alamo Conference) (1936–1939)
1936	St. Mary's	7–3–2	1–1	T–1st	
1937	St. Mary's	7–2–2	1–0–1	T–1st	
1938	St. Mary's	6–9	0–2	3rd	
1939	St. Mary's	5–4–2	1–2	3rd	
St. Mary's:		31–22–7	3–5–1		
Total:		82–53–17			
National championship Conference title Conference division title or championship game berth

=== College basketball ===
Record table
Season	Team	Overall	Conference	Standing	Postseason
Baylor Bears (Southwest Conference) (1920–1926)
1920–21	Baylor	13–11	8–4	2nd	
1921–22	Baylor	10–8	8–8	3rd	
1922–23	Baylor	7–16	7–13	3rd	
1923–24	Baylor	11–23	7–17	6th	
1924–25	Baylor	3–12	2–12	T–7th	
1925–26	Baylor	8–7	5–7	5th	
Baylor:		52–77	37–61		
Simmons Cowboys (Texas Conference) (1927–1929)
1927–28	Simmons	7–12			
1928–29	Simmons	16–3			
Simmons:		23–15			
St. Mary's Rattlers (Alamo Conference) (1935–1939)
1935–26	St. Mary's	5–10	2–6		
1936–37	St. Mary's	4–14	0–6		
1937–38	St. Mary's	3–10	0–4		
1938–39	St. Mary's	15–11	5–3	T–1st	
St. Mary's:		27–45	8–19		
Total:		102–137			
National champion Postseason invitational champion Conference regular season champion Conference regular season and conference tournament champion Division regular season champion Division regular season and conference tournament champion Conference tournament champion

=== College baseball ===
Record table
Season	Team	Overall	Conference	Standing	Postseason
Baylor Bears (Southwest Conference) (1920–1927)
1920	Baylor	13–7	8–5	3rd	
1921	Baylor	3–11	3–9	5th	
1922	Baylor	13–7	11–5	2nd	
1923	Baylor	15–6	14–5	1st	
1924	Baylor	16–9	11–8	4th	
1925	Baylor	13–10	9–5	3rd	
1926	Baylor	12–9	6–5	4th	
1927	Baylor	10–4	5–11	5th	
Baylor:		95–73 (.565)	67–53 (.558)		
Total:		95–73 (.565)			
National champion Postseason invitational champion Conference regular season champion Conference regular season and conference tournament champion Division regular season champion Division regular season and conference tournament champion Conference tournament champion

=== Junior college football ===
Year	Team	Overall	Conference	Standing	Bowl/playoffs
Texas Military College Bulldogs (Central Texas Conference) (1933–1934)
1933	Texas Military College	6–3–2	4–0–1	1st	
1934	Texas Military College	6–3	1–2	4th	
Texas Military College:		12–6–2	5–2–1		
Total:		12–6–2			
National championship Conference title Conference division title or championship game berth
