= 1939 West Texas State Buffaloes football team =

American college football season

1939 West Texas State Buffaloes football

Alamo champion
- Conference: Alamo Conference
- Record: 5–3–1 (2–0–1 Alamo)
- Head coach: Al Baggett (7th season)
- Home stadium: Buffalo Stadium

1939 Alamo Conference football standings
	Conf.					Overall
Team	W		L		T	W		L		T
Texas A&I +	2	–	0	–	1	6	–	1	–	3
West Texas State +	2	–	0	–	1	5	–	3	–	1
St. Mary's (TX)	1	–	2	–	0	5	–	4	–	2
Sul Ross	0	–	3	–	0	0	–	7	–	1
+ – Conference co-champions

The 1939 West Texas State Buffaloes football team represented West Texas State Teachers College—now known as West Texas A&M University—as a member of the Alamo Conference during the 1939 college football season. Led by Al Baggett in his seventh and final season as head coach, the Buffaloes compiled an overall record of 5–3–1 with a mark of 2–0–1 in conference play, sharing the Alamo Conference title with Texas A&I. West Texas State played home games at Buffalo Stadium in Canyon, Texas.

== Schedule ==
Date	Time	Opponent	Site	Result	Attendance	Source
September 30		at Arizona State*	Goodwin Stadium; Tempe, AZ	L 0–19	5,000	
October 6	8:00 p.m.	Western State (CO)*	Buffalo Stadium; Canyon, TX	W 35–0		
October 20	8:00 p.m.	at Oklahoma City*	Goldbug Field; Oklahoma City, OK	L 14–19		
October 28	2:30 p.m.	St. Mary's (TX)^{†}	Buffalo Stadium; Canyon, TX	W 34–13	6,000	
November 4		at Pittsburg State*	Pittsburg, KS	W 7–0		
November 11		at Hardin–Simmons*	Parramore Field; Abilene, TX	L 13–18		
November 18		at Sul Ross	Alpine, TX	W 26–6		
November 25	2:30 p.m.	South Dakota State*	Buffalo Stadium; Canyon, TX	W 35–7		
November 30	2:30 p.m.	at Texas A&I	A&I Field; Kingsville, TX	T 0–0		
*Non-conference game; ^{†}Homecoming; All times are in Central time
