= List of Creighton Bluejays football seasons =

This is a list of seasons completed by the Creighton Bluejays football team. Creighton fielded their first team in 1900 under Herbert Whipple.

== Seasons ==
Legend

^{‡} Conference champions

Season	Coach	Conference	Season results			
Season	Coach	Conference	Conference finish	Wins	Losses	Ties
1900	Herbert Whipple	Independent		3	3	1
1901	Herbert Whipple	Independent		6	1	1
1902	Alfred G. Ellick	Independent		8	2	0
1903	Charles G. McDonald	Independent		6	3	0
1904	Fred A. Williams	Independent		4	2	0
1905	Dan B. Butler	Independent		1	5	0
1906	George H. Cavanaugh	Independent		7	2	0
1907	A. K. Bell	Independent		6	2	0
1908	Clarence Kenney	Independent		3	3	2
1909	Jack Schneider	Independent		3	3	0
1910	Harry Miller	Independent		5	4	1
1911	Harry Miller	Independent		3	4	2
1912	Harry Miller	Independent		5	3	0
1913	Harry Miller	Independent		3	3	1
1914	Harry Miller	Independent		5	4	0
1915	Tommy Mills	Independent		3	3	1
1916	Tommy Mills	Independent		4	1	2
1917	Tommy Mills	Independent		6	2	1
1918	Tommy Mills	Independent		3	0	0
1919	Tommy Mills	Independent		4	0	2
1920	Eddie Mulholland	Independent		1	6	1
1921	Howard M. Baldrige	Independent		8	1	0
1922	Howard M. Baldrige	NCC	T–2nd	7	2	1
1923	Chet A. Wynne	NCC	T–5th	5	5	0
1924	Chet A. Wynne	NCC	3rd	6	1	2
1925^{‡}	Chet A. Wynne	NCC	T–1st	6	3	1
1926	Chet A. Wynne	NCC	4th	4	4	1
1927^{‡}	Chet A. Wynne	NCC	T–1st	6	1	1
1928	Chet A. Wynne	MVC	2nd	3	5	1
1929	Chet A. Wynne	MVC	5th	2	6	0
1930	Arthur R. Stark	MVC	5th	1	7	0
1931	Arthur R. Stark	MVC	3rd	5	5	0
1932	Arthur R. Stark	MVC	2nd	5	2	1
1933	Arthur R. Stark	MVC	3rd	3	4	1
1934	Eddie Hickey	MVC	2nd	2	7	0
1935	Marchmont Schwartz	MVC	3rd	3	5	1
1936^{‡}	Marchmont Schwartz	MVC	T–1st	4	4	0
1937	Marchmont Schwartz	MVC	T–6th	2	7	0
1938	Marchmont Schwartz	MVC	NA (Note: Creighton went 1–0–1 in conference play, but was ineligible for the conference title because they lacked the required minimum four conference games.)	6	1	1
1939	Marchmont Schwartz	MVC	T–5th	4	5	0
1940	Maurice H. Palrang	MVC	T–3rd	6	2	2
1941	Maurice H. Palrang	MVC	3rd	5	5	0
1942	Maurice H. Palrang	MVC	T–5th	5	4	0
Total				187	143	28
