= Lloyd Russell =

American baseball, football, track and basketball player (1913–1968)

- Russell pictured in The Yucca 1943, North Texas State Teachers yearbook

Biographical details
- Born: April 10, 1913; Atoka, Oklahoma, U.S.
- Died: May 24, 1968 (aged 55); Waco, Texas, U.S.

Playing career

Football
- 1935–1936: Baylor

Track
- 1935–1937: Baylor

Basketball
- 1935–1936: Baylor

Baseball
- 1935–1936: Baylor
- 1938: Cleveland Indians
- Positions: Quarterback (football); Shortstop (baseball)

Coaching career (HC unless noted)

Football
- 1938–1940: Baylor (backfield)
- 1941: St. Mary's (TX)
- 1942: North Texas State Teachers

Basketball
- 1941–1942: St. Mary's (TX)

Baseball
- 1940–1941: Baylor
- 1958–1961: Baylor

Head coaching record
- Overall: 10–9–1 (football); 5–4 (basketball); 72–58–1 (baseball)

Accomplishments and honors

Awards
- First-team All-SWC (1936)

Lloyd Opal Russell (April 10, 1913 – May 24, 1968) was an American football and baseball player and coach of football, basketball, and baseball. He served as the head football coach at North Texas State Teachers College, now the University of North Texas, in 1942, tallying a mark of 3–5. Russell was also the head baseball coach at Baylor University from 1940 to 1941 and again from 1958 to 1961, compiling a record of 72–58–1.

Russell played baseball for the Cleveland Indians in 1938 before starting his coaching career. He served in both the Atlantic and Pacific for the United States Navy during World War II.

== Head coaching record ==
=== Basketball ===
Record table
Season	Team	Overall	Conference	Standing	Postseason
St. Mary’s (TX) (Independent) (1927)
1941–42	St. Mary’s	5–4			
Total:		5-4			

=== Football ===
Year	Team	Overall	Conference	Standing	Bowl/playoffs
St. Mary's Rattlers (Alamo Conference) (1941)
1941	St. Mary's	7–4–1	0–1	2nd	
St. Mary's:		7–4–1	0–1		
North Texas State Teachers Eagles (Lone Star Conference) (1942)
1942	North Texas State Teachers	3–5	1–2	3rd	
North Texas State Teachers:		3–5	1–2		
Total:		10–9–1			
