= 1941 New Mexico A&M Aggies football team =

American college football season

1941 New Mexico A&M Aggies football
- Conference: Border Conference
- Record: 2–7 (0–6 Border)
- Head coach: Julius H. Johnston (2nd season)
- Home stadium: Quesenberry Field

1941 Border Conference football standings
	Conf.					Overall
Team	W		L		T	W		L		T
Arizona $	5	–	0	–	0	7	–	3	–	0
Texas Tech	2	–	0	–	0	9	–	2	–	0
West Texas State	4	–	1	–	0	8	–	2	–	0
Hardin–Simmons	3	–	1	–	0	7	–	3	–	1
New Mexico	3	–	2	–	1	5	–	4	–	1
Texas Mines	3	–	4	–	0	4	–	5	–	1
Arizona State	2	–	4	–	1	5	–	1	–	1
Arizona State–Flagstaff	1	–	5	–	0	3	–	5	–	0
New Mexico A&M	0	–	6	–	0	2	–	7	–	0
$ – Conference champion

The 1941 New Mexico A&M Aggies football team was an American football team that represented New Mexico College of Agriculture and Mechanical Arts (now known as New Mexico State University) as a member of the Border Conference during the 1941 college football season. In its second year under head coach Julius H. Johnston, the team compiled a 2–7 record (0–6 against conference opponents), finished in last place in the conference, and was outscored by a total of 228 to 93. The team played its home games at Quesenberry Field in Las Cruces, New Mexico.

End Rex Dempsey was selected by the conference coaches as a second-team player on the 1941 All-Border Conference football team.

== Schedule ==
Date	Opponent	Site	Result	Attendance	Source
September 19	New Mexico Highlands*	Quesenberry Field; Las Cruces, NM	W 52–0		
September 26	Silver City Teachers*	Quesenberry Field; Las Cruces, NM	W 7–6		
October 4	at Arizona	Arizona Stadium; Tucson, AZ	L 0–47	7,500	
October 11	at West Texas State	Buffalo Stadium; Canyon, TX	L 0–51		
October 18	Arizona State	Quesenberry Field; Las Cruces, NM	L 14–19		
October 25	at Bradley*	Peoria, IL	L 0–26	5,000	
November 1	at Arizona State–Flagstaff	Skidmore Field; Flagstaff, AZ	L 7–27		
November 8	New Mexico	Quesenberry Field; Las Cruces, NM (rivalry)	L 0–28	5,000	
November 22	at Texas Mines	Kidd Field; El Paso, TX (rivalry)	L 13–24	3,000	
*Non-conference game
