= 1941 Tulsa Golden Hurricane football team =

American college football season

1941 Tulsa Golden Hurricane football

MVC champion

Sun Bowl, W 6–0 vs. Texas Tech
- Conference: Missouri Valley Conference
- Record: 8–2 (5–0 MVC)
- Head coach: Henry Frnka (1st season)
- Home stadium: Skelly Field

1941 Missouri Valley Conference football standings
	Conf.					Overall
Team	W		L		T	W		L		T
Tulsa $	4	–	0	–	0	8	–	2	–	0
Oklahoma A&M	3	–	1	–	0	5	–	4	–	0
Creighton	3	–	2	–	0	5	–	5	–	0
Saint Louis	1	–	3	–	1	4	–	5	–	1
Washington University	1	–	3	–	0	4	–	5	–	0
Drake	0	–	3	–	1	4	–	5	–	1
$ – Conference champion

The 1941 Tulsa Golden Hurricane team represented the University of Tulsa during the 1941 college football season. In their first year under head coach Henry Frnka, the Golden Hurricane compiled an 8–2 record (4–0 against conference opponents), won the Missouri Valley Conference championship, and defeated Texas Tech, 6–0, in the 1942 Sun Bowl.

The team was led by brothers Glenn Dobbs and Bobby Dobbs. Glenn was later inducted into the College Football Hall of Fame; Bobby served as Tulsa's head coach from 1955 to 1960.

Six Tulsa players were selected by the conference coaches as first-team players on the 1941 All-Missouri Valley Conference football team: halfbacks Glenn Dobbs and N.A. Keithley; end Elston Campbell and Saxon Judd; center Richard Morgan; and tackle Charles Greene. Four others were named to the second team: quarterback Joe Gibson; guard Roy Stuart and Wayne Holt; and tackle Jim Worthington.

Tulsa was ranked at No. 66 (out of 681 teams) in the final rankings under the Litkenhous Difference by Score System for 1941.

== Schedule ==
Date	Opponent	Site	Result	Attendance	Source
September 27	at TCU*	Amon G. Carter Stadium; Fort Worth, TX	L 0–6	7,500	
October 11	Creighton	Skelly Field; Tulsa, OK	W 19–7	10,000	
October 18	Saint Louis	Skelly Field; Tulsa, OK	W 33–7	8,500	
October 25	at Oklahoma A&M	Lewis Field; Stillwater, OK (rivalry)	W 16–0	12,000	
November 1	at Wichita*	Wichita, KS	W 13–7		
November 8	North Dakota Agricultural*	Skelly Field; Tulsa, OK	W 61–6	7,000	
November 15	Baylor*^{†}	Skelly Field; Tulsa, OK	W 20–13	14,000	
November 22	Drake	Skelly Field; Tulsa, OK	W 20–6	2,500	
November 27	Arkansas*	Skelly Field; Tulsa, OK	L 6–13	16,000–17,000	
January 1, 1942	vs. Texas Tech*	Kidd Field; El Paso, TX (Sun Bowl)	W 6–0	12,000–14,000	
*Non-conference game; ^{†}Homecoming

== 1942 NFL draft ==
The following Golden Hurricane players were selected in the 1942 NFL draft following the season.

Round	Pick	Player	Position	NFL club
6	41	Charley Greene	Tackle	Pittsburgh Steelers
13	111	Wayne Holt	Guard	Pittsburgh Steelers
16	142	Glenn Henicle	Guard	Cleveland Rams
