= 1941 Hardin–Simmons Cowboys football team =

American college football season

1941 Hardin–Simmons Cowboys football
- Conference: Border Conference
- Record: 7–3–1 (3–1 Border)
- Head coach: Warren B. Woodson (1st season)

1941 Border Conference football standings
	Conf.					Overall
Team	W		L		T	W		L		T
Arizona $	5	–	0	–	0	7	–	3	–	0
Texas Tech	2	–	0	–	0	9	–	2	–	0
West Texas State	4	–	1	–	0	8	–	2	–	0
Hardin–Simmons	3	–	1	–	0	7	–	3	–	1
New Mexico	3	–	2	–	1	5	–	4	–	1
Texas Mines	3	–	4	–	0	4	–	5	–	1
Arizona State	2	–	4	–	1	5	–	1	–	1
Arizona State–Flagstaff	1	–	5	–	0	3	–	5	–	0
New Mexico A&M	0	–	6	–	0	2	–	7	–	0
$ – Conference champion

The 1941 Hardin–Simmons Cowboys football team was an American football team that represented Hardin–Simmons University as a member of the Border Conference during the 1942 college football season. The team compiled a 7–3–1 record (3–1 against conference opponents), tied for third place in the conference, and outscored all opponents by a total of 178 to 88.

Three Hardin-Simmons players were selected by the conference coaches as first-team players on the 1941 All-Border Conference football team: quarterback Murray Evans; end H.C. Burrus; and tackle Truett Rattan.

Hardin-Simmons was ranked at No. 93 (out of 681 teams) in the final rankings under the Litkenhous Difference by Score System for 1941.

Warren B. Woodson was in his first season as the team's head coach. Woodson was later inducted into the College Football Hall of Fame.

== Schedule ==
Date	Opponent	Site	Result	Attendance	Source
September 20	at Texas Wesleyan*	Farrington Stadium; Fort Worth, TX	W 31–7	16,000	
September 27	at Baylor*	Waco, TX	L 0–20		
October 4	North Texas State*	Parramore Field; Abilene, TX	L 3–7		
October 11	at Centenary*	Centenary Field; Shreveport, LA	W 27–6	4,500	
October 17	at San Jose State*	Spartan Stadium; San Jose, CA	T 7–7	9,000	
October 24	at Texas Mines	Kidd Field; El Paso, TX	W 44–14	6,000	
November 1	West Texas State	Abilene, TX	W 20–13	4,000	
November 15	at Louisiana Tech*	Tech Stadium; Ruston, LA	W 13–0		
November 21	at Texas Tech	Tech Field; Lubbock, TX	L 0–7	16,000	
November 29	Howard Payne*^{†}	Abilene, TX	W 13–7	5,000	
December 6	Arizona State	Abilene, TX	W 20–0		
*Non-conference game; ^{†}Homecoming
