= 1941 Texas A&I Javelinas football team =

American college football season

1941 Texas A&I Javelinas football

Alamo champion
- Conference: Alamo Conference
- Record: 8–2 (1–0 Alamo)
- Head coach: Bud McCallum (13th season)
- Captains: Maurice Taylor; Johnny Vargo

1941 Alamo Conference football standings
| | Conf. | | | | | Overall |
| Team | W | | L | | T | W | | L | | T |
|---|---|---|---|---|---|---|---|---|---|---|
| Texas A&I $ | 1 | – | 0 | – | 0 | 8 | – | 2 | – | 0 |
| St. Mary's (TX) | 0 | – | 1 | – | 0 | 7 | – | 4 | – | 1 |
$ – Conference champion

The 1941 Texas A&I Javelinas football team was an American football team that represented the Texas College of Arts and Industries (now known as Texas A&M University–Kingsville) as a member of the Alamo Conference during the 1941 college football season. In their 13th and final season under head coach Bud McCallum, the Javelinas compiled an 8–2 record and outscored opponents by a total of 335 to 123. They were the highest scoring football team in the nation in 1941.

Key players for the Javelinas included backs Leon Price, Gilbert Steinke and Johnny Vargo, end Warren "Bubba Arnold", and center Stuart Clarkson.

Texas A&I was ranked at No. 61 (out of 681 teams) in the final rankings under the Litkenhous Difference by Score System for 1941.

The team played its home games in Kingsville, Texas.

== Schedule ==
| Date | Opponent | Site | Result | Attendance | Source |
|---|---|---|---|---|---|
| September 19 | at San Jose State* | Spartan Stadium; San Jose, CA | L 7–14 | 9.000 | |
| September 25 | at Arizona State* | Goodwin Stadium; Tempe, AZ | W 35–7 | 8,000 | |
| October 4 | vs. Texas A&M* | Alamo Stadium; San Antonio, TX | L 0–41 | 16,955 | |
| October 11 | Sam Houston State* | Kingsville, TX | W 46–7 | 9,000 | |
| October 17 | at Southwest Texas State* | Evans Field; San Marcos, TX | W 13–7 | | |
| October 25 | East Central (OK)* | Kingsville, TX | W 68–0 | | |
| November 1 | at Stephen F. Austin* | Nacogdoches, TX | W 55–7 | | |
| November 15 | at St. Mary's (TX) | Alamo Stadium; San Antonio, TX | W 33–7 | | |
| November 22 | West Texas State* | Kingsville, TX | W 39–7 | | |
| November 29 | vs. Texas Wesleyan* | Buccaneer Stadium; Corpus Christi, TX | W 39–13 | 4,000 | |
*Non-conference game
