= Bud McCallum =

Biographical details
- Born: February 19, 1900; Texas, U.S.
- Died: May 26, 1977 (aged 77); Travis County, Texas, U.S.
- Education: The University of Texas at Austin

Playing career

Football
- 1916–1920: Texas
- Position: End

Coaching career (HC unless noted)

Football
- 1923–1928: Wichita Falls HS (TX)
- 1929–1941: Texas A&I
- 1944–1959: Roy Miller HS (TX)

Basketball
- 1929–1940: Texas A&I

Administrative career (AD unless noted)
- 1929–1941: Texas A&I

Head coaching record
- Overall: 71–34–9 (college football); 92–119 (college basketball)

Accomplishments and honors

Championships
- Football; 1 TIAA (1932); 5 Alamo (1936–1939, 1941)

Awards
- All-Southwest Conference - 1910; SWC Champion - 1916, 1918, 1920; TIAA Champion - 1918

Alvaro Yelvington "Bud" McCallum (February 19, 1900 – March 26, 1977) was an American football player, coach of football and basketball, and college athletics administrator. He served as the head football coach at Texas College of Arts and Industries—now known as Texas A&M University–Kingsville–from 1929 to 1941, compiling a record of 71–34–9. McCallum was also the head basketball coach at Texas A&I from 1929 to 1940, tallying a mark of 92–119, and the school's athletic director from 1929 to 1941.

As a college football player, McCallum was an All-Southwest Conference end for the University of Texas–Austin in 1920 and he helped the Longhorns to win the Southwest Conference Championship in 1916, 1918 and 1920 and the TIAA Championship in 1918.

He was coach at Wichita Falls High School from 1923 to 1928.

He was the son of women's suffrage activist Jane Y. McCallum and Arthur Newell "A. N." McCallum, the first superintendent of the Austin Independent School District for whom McCallum High School is named. His son, 2LT Arthur Kercheville McCallum, died in 1961 in a carrier landing accident 25 miles off Corpus Christi in the Gulf of Mexico.

== Head coaching record ==
=== College football ===
Year	Team	Overall	Conference	Standing	Bowl/playoffs
Texas A&I Javelinas (Independent) (1929)
1929	Texas A&I	3–4–1			
Texas A&I Javelinas (Texas Intercollegiate Athletic Association) (1930–1932)
1930	Texas A&I	3–3–3	1–2–1	7th	
1931	Texas A&I	8–1	4–0	2nd (Eastern)	
1932	Texas A&I	6–2	3–0	1st	
Texas A&I Javelinas (Independent) (1933–1935)
1933	Texas A&I	6–2			
1934	Texas A&I	5–1–1			
1935	Texas A&I	3–5			
Texas A&I Javelinas (Alamo Conference) (1936–1941)
1936	Texas A&I	6–4	1–1	T–1st	
1937	Texas A&I	4–3–1	1–0–1	T–1st	
1938	Texas A&I	7–3	2–0	1st	
1939	Texas A&I	6–1–3	1–0–1	T–1st	
1940	Texas A&I	6–3	1–1	2nd	
1941	Texas A&I	8–2	1–0	1st	
Texas A&I:		71–34–9	15–4–3		
Total:		71–34–9			
National championship Conference title Conference division title or championship game berth
