= 1941 Arizona State–Flagstaff Lumberjacks football team =

American college football season

1941 Arizona State–Flagstaff Lumberjacks football
- Conference: Border Conference
- Record: 3–5 (1–5 Border)
- Head coach: Maurice Moulder (2nd season)
- Home stadium: Skidmore Field

1941 Border Conference football standings
	Conf.					Overall
Team	W		L		T	W		L		T
Arizona $	5	–	0	–	0	7	–	3	–	0
Texas Tech	2	–	0	–	0	9	–	2	–	0
West Texas State	4	–	1	–	0	8	–	2	–	0
Hardin–Simmons	3	–	1	–	0	7	–	3	–	1
New Mexico	3	–	2	–	1	5	–	4	–	1
Texas Mines	3	–	4	–	0	4	–	5	–	1
Arizona State	2	–	4	–	1	5	–	1	–	1
Arizona State–Flagstaff	1	–	5	–	0	3	–	5	–	0
New Mexico A&M	0	–	6	–	0	2	–	7	–	0
$ – Conference champion

The 1941 Arizona State–Flagstaff Lumberjacks football team was an American football team that represented Arizona State Teachers College at Flagstaff (now known as Northern Arizona University) in the Border Conference during the 1941 college football season. In its second year under head coach Maurice Moulder, the team compiled a 3–5 record (1–5 against conference opponents) and was outscored by a total of 143 to 119. The team played its home games at Skidmore Field in Flagstaff, Arizona.

End Don Snyder was selected by the conference coaches as a second-team player on the 1941 All-Border Conference football team.

Arizona State–Flagstaff was ranked at No. 261 (out of 681 teams) in the final rankings under the Litkenhous Difference by Score System.

== Schedule ==
Date	Opponent	Site	Result	Attendance	Source
September 20	Eastern New Mexico*	Skidmore Field; Flagstaff, AZ	W 32–0		
September 26	at New Mexico	Hilltop Stadium; Albuquerque, NM	L 6–12	5,000	
October 11	New Mexico State Teachers*	Skidmore Field; Flagstaff, AZ	W 34–0		
October 25	West Texas State	Skidmore Field; Flagstaff, AZ	L 0–27		
November 1	New Mexico A&M^{†}	Skidmore Field; Flagstaff, AZ	W 27–7		
November 8	at Arizona	Arizona Stadium; Tucson, AZ	L 0–41	5,500	
November 15	at Arizona State	Goodwin Stadium; Tempe, AZ	L 0–33	5,000	
November 29	at Texas Mines	Kidd Field; El Paso, TX	L 20–23	3,000	
*Non-conference game; ^{†}Homecoming
