= 1942 Sun Bowl =

American college football game

Tulsa Golden Hurricane	Texas Tech Red Raiders
(7–2)	(9–1)
Missouri Valley	Border Conference
6	0
Head coach: Henry Frnka	Head coach: Dell Morgan
	1	2	3	4	Total
Tulsa	0	0	0	6	6
Texas Tech	0	0	0	0	0
- Date: January 1, 1942
- Season: 1941
- Stadium: Kidd Field
- Location: El Paso, Texas
- Attendance: 14,000

The 1942 Sun Bowl was a college football postseason bowl game between the Texas Tech Red Raiders and the Tulsa Golden Hurricane.

== Background ==
Tulsa was champion of the Missouri Valley Conference, leading to their invitation to the Sun Bowl. This was their first ever bowl game appearance. The Red Raiders were 2nd in the Border Intercollegiate Athletic Association. This was their first bowl game under new head coach Dell Morgan, and first bowl game since 1939.

== Game summary ==
The game was scoreless until the last two minutes of the game. Tulsa was at the 25 yard line of the Red Raiders. Glenn Dobbs threw a pass to Saxon Judd, who ran into the end zone to give the Golden Hurricane a 6-0 lead, which turned out to be the winning score. Glen Dobbs went 20-of-31 passes for 201 yards, setting a Sun Bowl record. Tulsa had 15 first downs and 335 yards compared to Texas Tech's four first downs and 104 yards.

== Statistics ==
Statistics	Texas Tech	Tulsa
First downs	4	15
Rushing yards	62	96
Passing yards	42	0239
Total offense	104	335
Passing	2–10–1	24–39–2
Fumbles–lost	5–2	0–0
Penalties–yards	8–90	6–60
Punts–average	12–43.0	13–37.0

== Aftermath ==
Tulsa appeared in four straight bowl games before Frnka left for Tulane, winning two more conference titles. Texas Tech did not return to a bowl game until 1948, with their third Sun Bowl appearance. Tulsa has not returned to a Sun Bowl since this game.
