= 1941 Texas Mines Miners football team =

American college football season

1941 Texas Mines Miners football
- Conference: Border Conference
- Record: 4–5–1 (3–4 Border)
- Head coach: Mack Saxon (13th season)
- Home stadium: Kidd Field

1941 Border Conference football standings
	Conf.					Overall
Team	W		L		T	W		L		T
Arizona $	5	–	0	–	0	7	–	3	–	0
Texas Tech	2	–	0	–	0	9	–	2	–	0
West Texas State	4	–	1	–	0	8	–	2	–	0
Hardin–Simmons	3	–	1	–	0	7	–	3	–	1
New Mexico	3	–	2	–	1	5	–	4	–	1
Texas Mines	3	–	4	–	0	4	–	5	–	1
Arizona State	2	–	4	–	1	5	–	1	–	1
Arizona State–Flagstaff	1	–	5	–	0	3	–	5	–	0
New Mexico A&M	0	–	6	–	0	2	–	7	–	0
$ – Conference champion

The 1941 Texas Mines Miners football team was an American football team that represented Texas School of Mines (now known as University of Texas at El Paso) as a member of the Border Conference during the 1941 college football season. In its 13th and final season under head coach Mack Saxon, the team compiled a 4–5–1 record (3–4 against Border Conference opponents), finished sixth in the conference, and was outscored by a total of 192 to 184.

Halfback Owen Price and guard William Caver were selected by the conference coaches as first-team players on the 1941 All-Border Conference football team. Tackle William Shoopman was named to the second team.

Texas Mines was ranked at No. 202 (out of 681 teams) in the final rankings under the Litkenhous Difference by Score System.

== Schedule ==
Date	Opponent	Site	Result	Attendance	Source
September 27	Louisiana Tech*	El Paso High School Stadium; El Paso, TX	T 0–0	7,000	
October 4	at New Mexico	Hilltop Stadium; Albuquerque, NM	L 14–16	6,000	
October 11	260th Coast Artillery*	Austin High School Stadium; El Paso, TX	W 54–6	5,000	
October 17	Loyola (CA)*	Kidd Field; El Paso, TX	L 6–20	8,500	
October 25	Hardin–Simmons	Kidd Field; El Paso, TX	L 14–44	6,000	
November 1	at Arizona	Arizona Stadium; Tucson, AZ	L 14–33	9,000	
November 8	at Arizona State	Goodwin Stadium; Tempe, AZ	W 28–0		
November 15	West Texas State	Kidd Field; El Paso, TX	L 7–40	4,000	
November 22	New Mexico A&M	Kidd Field; El Paso, TX (rivalry)	W 40–13	3,000	
November 29	Arizona State–Flagstaff^{†}	Kidd Field; El Paso, TX	W 23–20	3,000	
*Non-conference game; ^{†}Homecoming
