= 1938 St. Mary's Rattlers football team =

American college football season

1938 St. Mary's Rattlers football
- Conference: Alamo Conference
- Record: 6–9 (0–2 Alamo)
- Head coach: Frank Bridges (4th season)
- Home stadium: Eagle Field

1938 Alamo Conference football standings
	Conf.					Overall
Team	W		L		T	W		L		T
Texas A&I $	2	–	0	–	0	6	–	3	–	0
Sul Ross	1	–	1	–	0	4	–	3	–	1
St. Mary's (TX)	0	–	2	–	0	6	–	9	–	0
$ – Conference champion

The 1938 St. Mary's Rattlers football team was an American football team that represented St. Mary's University, located in San Antonio, Texas, as a member of the Alamo Conference during 1938 college football season. Led by Frank Bridges in his fourth season as head coach, the team compiled a record of 6–9 overall with a mark of 0–2 in conference play, placing last out of three teams.

== Schedule ==
Date	Time	Opponent	Site	Result	Attendance	Source
September 18		at San Francisco*	Kezar Stadium; San Francisco, CA	L 0–31		
September 21		at Cal Poly*	Mustang Stadium; San Luis Obispo, CA	L 0–6		
September 25		at San Diego Marines*	San Diego, CA	L 0–27	5,000	
October 1		Daniel Baker*	Eagle Field; San Antonio, TX	W 27–0		
October 7		at Loyola (LA)*	New Orleans, LA	L 12–14		
October 15		Ouachita Baptist*	Eagle Field; San Antonio, TX	W 29–14		
October 22		at Sul Ross	Alpine, TX	L 7–9		
October 27		McKendree*	Eagle Field; San Antonio, TX	W 44–0		
October 29	2:30 p.m.	at Texas Mines*	Kidd Field; El Paso, TX	W 13–6		
November 5		Texas A&I	Eagle Field; San Antonio, TX	L 7–13		
November 11		Trinity (TX)*^{†}	Eagle Field; San Antonio, TX	W 21–0		
November 19		Louisiana College*	Eagle Field; San Antonio, TX	L 7–13		
November 24		at Washburn*	Moore Bowl; Topeka, KS	L 20–33		
December 2		Toledo*	Eagle Field; San Antonio, TX	L 7–13		
December 18		vs. St. Edward's*	Houston, TX	W 27–7		
*Non-conference game; ^{†}Homecoming; All times are in Central time
