= Al Baggett =

American football and basketball coach

Biographical details
- Born: March 6, 1903; Arkansas, U.S.
- Died: May 12, 1976 (aged 73); Morehead City, North Carolina, U.S.

Coaching career (HC unless noted)

Football
- 1924–1927: Vernon HS (TX)
- 1928–1930: Wichita Falls
- 1931–1932: Amarillo
- 1933–1939: West Texas State

Basketball
- 1934–1942: West Texas State
- 1947–1950: Brooklyn

Administrative career (AD unless noted)
- 1933–1946: West Texas State

Head coaching record
- Overall: 36–28–5 (college football); 216–93 (college basketball); 32–9–1 (high school football)

Accomplishments and honors

Championships
- Football; 1 Alamo (1939)

Eustace Albert Baggett (March 6, 1903 – May 12, 1976) was an American football and basketball coach. He served as head football coach at West Texas State Teachers College—now known as West Texas A&M University—in Canyon, Texas from 1933 to 1939. Baggett compiled a 36–28–5 record in seven seasons and currently ranks third on the schools all-time winning list behind Joe Kerbel (68–42–1) and Frank Kimbrough (54–52–2).

He was also the head basketball coach at West Texas State from 1934 to 1942. He was then the head coach at Brooklyn College from 1947 to 1950, compiling a career college basketball coaching record of 216–93; he was followed as a coach at Brooklyn by Tubby Raskin.

Baggett was a graduate of Ouachita Baptist University in Arkadelphia, Arkansas and pursued a master's degree at Columbia University. Prior to being hired at West Texas State in 1933, he coached at Vernon High School in Vernon, Texas, Wichita Falls Junior College (now known as Midwestern State University), and Amarillo Junior College (now known as Amarillo College).

He is the great-uncle of model, Alley Baggett.

== Head coaching record ==
=== College football ===
Year	Team	Overall	Conference	Standing	Bowl/playoffs
West Texas State Buffaloes (Independent) (1933–1938)
1933	West Texas State	2–9			
1934	West Texas State	4–6			
1935	West Texas State	5–4–1			
1936	West Texas State	7–1–2			
1937	West Texas State	6–3			
1938	West Texas State	7–2–1			
West Texas State Buffaloes (Alamo Conference) (1939)
1939	West Texas State	5–3–1	2–0–1	T–1st	
West Texas State:		36–28–5	2–0–1		
Total:		36–28–5			
National championship Conference title Conference division title or championship game berth

=== High school football ===
Year	Team	Overall	Conference	Standing	Bowl/playoffs
Vernon Lions () (1924–1927)
1924	Vernon	8–1–1			
1925	Vernon	10–1			
1926	Vernon	7–3			
1927	Vernon	7–4			
Vernon:		32–9–1			
Total:		32–9–1			
National championship Conference title Conference division title or championship game berth
