= 1941 Texas Tech Red Raiders football team =

American college football season

1941 Texas Tech Red Raiders football
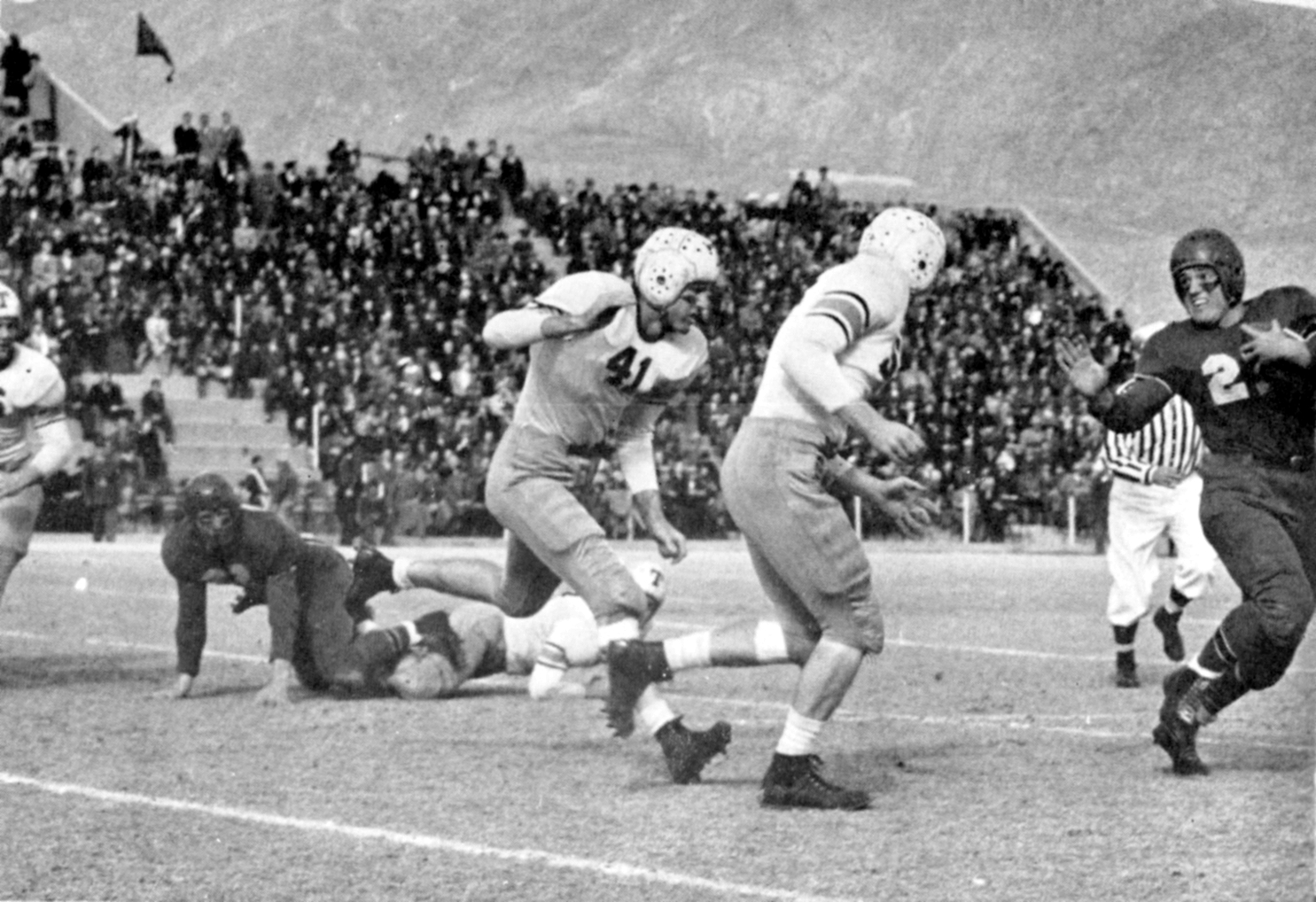
- 1941 Texas Tech football team in action against the Miami Hurricanes

Sun Bowl, L 0–6 vs. Tulsa
- Conference: Border Conference
- Record: 9–2 (2–0 Border)
- Head coach: Dell Morgan (1st season)
- Offensive scheme: Single-wing
- Base defense: 6–2
- Home stadium: Tech Field

1941 Border Conference football standings
	Conf.					Overall
Team	W		L		T	W		L		T
Arizona $	5	–	0	–	0	7	–	3	–	0
Texas Tech	2	–	0	–	0	9	–	2	–	0
West Texas State	4	–	1	–	0	8	–	2	–	0
Hardin–Simmons	3	–	1	–	0	7	–	3	–	1
New Mexico	3	–	2	–	1	5	–	4	–	1
Texas Mines	3	–	4	–	0	4	–	5	–	1
Arizona State	2	–	4	–	1	5	–	1	–	1
Arizona State–Flagstaff	1	–	5	–	0	3	–	5	–	0
New Mexico A&M	0	–	6	–	0	2	–	7	–	0
$ – Conference champion

The 1941 Texas Tech Red Raiders football team was an American football team that represented Texas Tech University as a member of the Border Conference during the 1941 college football season. In their first season under head coach Dell Morgan, the Red Raiders compiled a 9–2 record (2–0 against conference opponents), lost to Tulsa in the 1942 Sun Bowl, and outscored opponents by a total of 226 to 36. The team shut out six opponents, allowed only 3.3 points per game, and ranked second ranked in scoring defense among 119 major college teams during the 1941 season. The team did not play sufficient number of games against conference opponents to qualify for the conference championship.

Quarterback Tyrus Bain and fullback Charles Dvoracek were selected by the conference coaches as second-team players on the 1941 All-Border Conference football team.

Texas Tech was ranked at No. 46 (out of 681 teams) in the final rankings under the Litkenhous Difference by Score System for 1941.

Home games were played at Tech Field in Lubbock, Texas.

== Schedule ==
Date	Opponent	Site	Result	Attendance	Source
September 21	Abilene Christian*	Tech Field; Lubbock, TX	W 34–0	9,000	
October 3	vs. Oklahoma A&M*	Taft Stadium; Oklahoma City, OK	W 16–6	5,000	
October 10	at Loyola (CA)*	Gilmore Stadium; Los Angeles, CA	W 14–0	15,000	
October 18	Centenary*	Tech Field; Lubbock, TX	W 25–0	7,000	
October 24	New Mexico	Tech Field; Lubbock, TX	W 36–0	7,000	
October 31	at Miami (FL)*	Burdine Stadium; Miami, FL	L 0–6	25,000	
November 8	Creighton*^{†}	Tech Field; Lubbock, TX	W 13–6	6,000	
November 15	Saint Louis*	Tech Field; Lubbock, TX	W 46–6	4,000	
November 21	Hardin–Simmons	Tech Field; Lubbock, TX	W 7–0	16,000	
November 29	vs. Wake Forest*	American Legion Memorial Stadium; Charlotte, NC	W 35–6	7,000	
January 1	vs. Tulsa*	Kidd Field; El Paso, TX (Sun Bowl)	L 0–6	12,000–14,000	
*Non-conference game; ^{†}Homecoming
