= 1938 Sul Ross Lobos football team =

American college football season

1938 Sul Ross Lobos football
- Conference: Alamo Conference
- Record: 4–3–1 (1–1 Alamo)
- Head coach: B. C. Graves (12th season)
- Home stadium: Jackson Field

1938 Alamo Conference football standings
	Conf.					Overall
Team	W		L		T	W		L		T
Texas A&I $	2	–	0	–	0	6	–	3	–	0
Sul Ross	1	–	1	–	0	4	–	3	–	1
St. Mary's (TX)	0	–	2	–	0	6	–	9	–	0
$ – Conference champion

The 1938 Sul Ross Lobos football team was an American football team that represented The Sul Ross State Teachers College, at Alpine (now known as Sul Ross State University) as a member of the Alamo Conference during the 1938 college football season. Led by B. C. Graves in his 12th season as head coach, the Lobos compiled an overall record of 4–3–1, with a mark of 1–1 in conference play, and finished second in the Alamo.

== Schedule ==
Date	Opponent	Site	Result	Source
September 24	vs. Weatherford*	Pecos, TX	W 33–9	
October 1	at Abilene Christian*	Abilene, TX	L 0–14	
October 8	vs. Tarleton Agricultural College*	Fairgrounds; Marfa, TX	W 19–7	
October 22	St. Mary's (TX)	Jackson Field; Alpine, TX	W 9–7	
October 29	at Texas A&I	Kingsville, TX	L 6–20	
November 5	at West Texas State*	Buffalo Stadium; Canyon, TX	L 7–16	
November 11	Schreiner*	Jackson Field; Alpine, TX	W 27–6	
November 19	Texas Wesleyan*	Jackson Field; Alpine, TX	T 7–7	
*Non-conference game
