= 1941 New Mexico Lobos football team =

American college football season

1941 New Mexico Lobos football
- Conference: Border Conference
- Record: 5–4–1 (3–2–1 Border)
- Head coach: Ted Shipkey (5th season)
- Home stadium: Hilltop Stadium

1941 Border Conference football standings
	Conf.					Overall
Team	W		L		T	W		L		T
Arizona $	5	–	0	–	0	7	–	3	–	0
Texas Tech	2	–	0	–	0	9	–	2	–	0
West Texas State	4	–	1	–	0	8	–	2	–	0
Hardin–Simmons	3	–	1	–	0	7	–	3	–	1
New Mexico	3	–	2	–	1	5	–	4	–	1
Texas Mines	3	–	4	–	0	4	–	5	–	1
Arizona State	2	–	4	–	1	5	–	1	–	1
Arizona State–Flagstaff	1	–	5	–	0	3	–	5	–	0
New Mexico A&M	0	–	6	–	0	2	–	7	–	0
$ – Conference champion

The 1941 New Mexico Lobos football team represented the University of New Mexico in the Border Conference during the 1941 college football season. In their fifth and final season under head coach Ted Shipkey, the Lobos compiled a 5–4–1 record (3–2–1 against Border opponents), finished fifth in the conference, and were outscored by opponents by a total of 135 to 116.

Guard William Thompson was selected by the conference coaches as a second-team player on the 1941 All-Border Conference football team.

New Mexico was ranked at No. 165 (out of 681 teams) in the final rankings under the Litkenhous Difference by Score System.

One week after the season ended, the United States entered World War II following the Attack on Pearl Harbor. In May 1942, New Mexico's head football coach, Ted Shipkey, was commissioned as a captain in the Army Air Corps and ordered to report to Albuquerque Air Base for assignment. In his five seasons at New Mexico, Shipkey compiled a 26–17–2 record.

== Schedule ==
Date	Opponent	Site	Result	Attendance	Source
September 26	Arizona State–Flagstaff	Hilltop Stadium; Albuquerque, NM	W 12–6	5,000	
October 4	Texas Mines	Hilltop Stadium; Albuquerque, NM	W 16–14	6,000	
October 11	at Arizona State	Goodwin Stadium; Tempe, AZ	T 0–0	4,000	
October 18	Arizona^{†}	Hilltop Stadium; Albuquerque, NM (rivalry)	L 6–31	10,000	
October 24	at Texas Tech	Tech Field; Lubbock, TX	L 0–36	7,000	
November 1	Nevada*	Hilltop Stadium; Albuquerque, NM	W 23–7		
November 8	at New Mexico A&M	Quesenberry Field; Las Cruces, NM (rivalry)	W 28–0	5,000	
November 15	at Marquette*	Marquette Stadium; Milwaukee, WI	L 0–34	12,000	
November 22	Loyola (CA)*	Hilltop Stadium; Albuquerque, NM	L 3–7	3,500	
November 29	Wyoming*	Hilltop Stadium; Albuquerque, NM	W 28–0		
*Non-conference game; ^{†}Homecoming
