= 1941 Creighton Bluejays football team =

American college football season

1941 Creighton Bluejays football
- Conference: Missouri Valley Conference
- Record: 5–5 (3–1 MVC)
- Head coach: Maurice H. Palrang (2nd season)
- Home stadium: Creighton Stadium

1941 Missouri Valley Conference football standings
	Conf.					Overall
Team	W		L		T	W		L		T
Tulsa $	4	–	0	–	0	8	–	2	–	0
Oklahoma A&M	3	–	1	–	0	5	–	4	–	0
Creighton	3	–	2	–	0	5	–	5	–	0
Saint Louis	1	–	3	–	1	4	–	5	–	1
Washington University	1	–	3	–	0	4	–	5	–	0
Drake	0	–	3	–	1	4	–	5	–	1
$ – Conference champion

The 1941 Creighton Bluejays football team was an American football team that represented Creighton University as a member of the Missouri Valley Conference (MVC) during the 1941 college football season. In its second season under head coach Maurice H. Palrang, the team compiled a 5–5 record (3–1 against MVC opponents) and was outscored by a total of 160 to 115.

Four Creighton players were selected by the conference coaches as second-team players on the 1941 All-Missouri Valley Conference football team: halfback Tony Porto; end Joe Boyle; center Fred Dondelinger; and tackle John Powers.

Creighton was ranked at No. 140 (out of 681 teams) in the final rankings under the Litkenhous Difference by Score System for 1941.

The team played its home games at Creighton Stadium in Omaha, Nebraska.

== Schedule ==
Date	Time	Opponent	Site	Result	Attendance	Source
September 21		St. Benedict's*	Creighton Stadium; Omaha, NE	W 13–7		
September 26		Centenary*	Creighton Stadium; Omaha, NE	W 32–20	7,000	
October 3		Saint Louis	Creighton Stadium; Omaha, NE	W 18–8	10,000	
October 11		at Tulsa	Skelly Field; Tulsa, OK	L 7–19	10,000	
October 18	2:30 p.m.	at Washington University	Francis Field; St. Louis, MO	W 14–13	3,500	
October 25		Drake^{†}	Creighton Stadium; Omaha, NE	W 12–7		
November 1		at Oklahoma A&M	Lewis Field; Stillwater, OK	L 6–13	4,000	
November 8		at Texas Tech*	Tech Field; Lubbock, TX	L 6–13	6,000	
November 16		at Loyola (CA)*	Gilmore Stadium; Los Angeles, CA	L 7–32		
November 23		Detroit*	Creighton Stadium; Omaha, NE	L 0–28	10,000	
*Non-conference game; ^{†}Homecoming; All times are in Central time
