= 1938 Texas A&I Javelinas football team =

American college football season

1938 Texas A&I Javelinas football

Alamo champion
- Conference: Alamo Conference
- Record: 7–3 (2–0 Alamo)
- Head coach: Bud McCallum (10th season)
- Captains: Kenneth Grimes; Don Hightower

1938 Alamo Conference football standings
	Conf.					Overall
Team	W		L		T	W		L		T
Texas A&I $	2	–	0	–	0	6	–	3	–	0
Sul Ross	1	–	1	–	0	4	–	3	–	1
St. Mary's (TX)	0	–	2	–	0	6	–	9	–	0
$ – Conference champion

The 1938 Texas A&I Javelinas football team was an American football team that represented Texas College of Arts and Industries (now known as Texas A&M University–Kingsville) as a member of the Alamo Conference during the 1938 college football season. Led by Bud McCallum in his 10th season as head coach, the Javelinas compiled an overall record of 7–3, with a mark of 2–0 in conference play, and finished as Alamo champion.

== Schedule ==
Date	Opponent	Site	Result	Attendance	Source
September 24	at Texas A&M*	Kyle Field; College Station, TX	L 0–52	11,000	
October 1	Randolph Field*	Kingsville, TX	W 30–0		
October 14	at Sam Houston State*	Pritchett Field; Huntsville, TX	L 6–19		
October 22	vs. Schreiner*	Clark Field; Corpus Christi, TX	W 20–13		
October 29	Sul Ross	Kingsville, TX	W 20–6		
November 5	at St. Mary's (TX)	Eagle Field; San Antonio, TX	W 13–7		
November 18	Trinity (TX)*	Kingsville, TX	W 26–19		
November 22	vs. UNAM*	Fairgrounds; Harlingen, TX	W 53–7	4,000–5,000	
November 29	St. Edward's*	Kingsville, TX	L 7–14		
*Non-conference game
