= 1941 San Diego State Aztecs football team =

American college football season

1941 San Diego State Aztecs football
- Conference: California Collegiate Athletic Association
- Record: 6–4 (0–3 CCAA)
- Head coach: Leo Calland (7th season)
- Home stadium: Aztec Bowl

1941 California Collegiate Athletic Association football standings
	Conf.					Overall
Team	W		L		T	W		L		T
San Jose State +	2	–	0	–	1	5	–	3	–	3
Fresno State +	2	–	0	–	1	4	–	3	–	2
Santa Barbara State	1	–	2	–	0	3	–	5	–	1
San Diego State	0	–	3	–	0	6	–	4	–	0
+ – Conference co-champions

The 1941 San Diego State Aztecs football team represented San Diego State College (Note: San Diego State University was known as San Diego State College from 1935 to 1971.) during the 1941 college football season.

San Diego State competed in the California Collegiate Athletic Association (CCAA). The 1941 team was led by head coach Leo B. Calland in his seventh season with the Aztecs. They played home games at two sites, Aztec Bowl and Balboa Stadium in San Diego, California. The Aztecs finished the season with six wins and four losses (6–4, 0–3 CCAA). Overall, the team outscored its opponents 105 to 87 for the season.

San Diego State was ranked at No. 210 (out of 681 teams) in the final rankings under the Litkenhous Difference by Score System.

== Schedule ==
Date	Opponent	Site	Result	Attendance	Source
September 26	Pomona*	Aztec Bowl; San Diego, CA	W 6–0	5,000	
October 4	Occidental*	Aztec Bowl; San Diego, CA	W 7–6	5,000	
October 10	San Jose State	Balboa Stadium; San Diego, CA	L 0–20	6,500	
October 18	Redlands*	Aztec Bowl; San Diego, CA	W 12–3		
October 25	at Fresno State	Ratcliffe Stadium; Fresno, CA (rivalry)	L 0–26	6,720	
November 7	at Camp Haan (CA) (Note: Camp Haan was a Coast Artillery Antiaircraft Replacement Training Center located on property adjacent to March Air Reserve Base near Riverside, California. It opened in 1941 and closed in 1947.)*	Balboa Stadium; San Diego, CA	L 0–6	4,000	
November 14	Caltech*	Aztec Bowl; San Diego, CA	W 44–6	3,000	
November 21	at Whittier*	Hadley Field; Whittier, CA	W 18–7		
November 28	Santa Barbara State	Aztec Bowl; San Diego, CA	L 6–7	5,000	
December 5	Pacific (CA)*	Balboa Stadium; San Diego, CA	W 12–6	9,000	
*Non-conference game
