= 1941 Santa Barbara State Gauchos football team =

American college football season

1941 Santa Barbara State Gauchos football
- Conference: California Collegiate Athletic Association
- Record: 3–5–1 (1–2 CCAA)
- Head coach: Stan Williamson (1st season)
- Home stadium: La Playa Stadium

1941 California Collegiate Athletic Association football standings
	Conf.					Overall
Team	W		L		T	W		L		T
San Jose State +	2	–	0	–	1	5	–	3	–	3
Fresno State +	2	–	0	–	1	4	–	3	–	2
Santa Barbara State	1	–	2	–	0	3	–	5	–	1
San Diego State	0	–	3	–	0	6	–	4	–	0
+ – Conference co-champions

The 1941 UC Santa Barbara Gauchos football team was an American football team that represented Santa Barbara State College (now known as the University of California, Santa Barbara) as a member of the California Collegiate Athletic Association (CCAA) during the 1941 college football season. In their first year under head coach Stan Williamson, the Gauchos compiled a 3–5–1 record (1–2 against CCAA opponents). The team played home games at La Playa Stadium in Santa Barbara, California.

Halfback/fullback Ernie Saenz was the team captain. Other key players included halfbacks Owen Van Buskirk and Hovis Bess, quarterback George James, fullback/guard Paul Siano, and centers Walt Ahlgren and Frankie Jones.

A tenth game, scheduled for October 18 against the University of California Ramblers, was cancelled after the team physician found that nine of Santa Barbara's 24 players were unfit to play.

Santa Barabara was ranked at No. 273 (out of 681 teams) in the final rankings under the Litkenhous Difference by Score System.

Due to World War II, this was the last year of competition for Santa Barbara until 1946.

== Schedule ==
Date	Opponent	Site	Result	Attendance	Source
September 19	Pomona*	La Playa Stadium; Santa Barbara, CA	L 6–7		
September 26	Occidental*	La Playa Stadium; Santa Barbara, CA	L 0–25		
October 4	Redlands*	La Playa Stadium; Santa Barbara, CA	W 19–7		
October 11	Fresno State	La Playa Stadium; Santa Barbara, CA	L 0–26	5,000	
October 25	at Nevada*	Mackay Stadium (Note: This stadium is the predecessor to the current Mackay Stadium, which was opened for the 1966 season."University of Nevada, Reno; Mackay Stadium".); Reno, NV	L 0–7		
October 31	at San Jose State	Spartan Stadium; San Jose, CA	L 14–33	4,500	
November 8	Cal Aggies*	La Playa Stadium; Santa Barbara, CA	T 6–6	3,000	
November 19	Pacific (CA)*	La Playa Stadium; Santa Barbara, CA	W 7–6		
November 28	at San Diego State	Aztec Bowl; San Diego, CA	W 7–6	5,000	
*Non-conference game
