= 1941 Fresno State Bulldogs football team =

American college football season

1941 Fresno State Bulldogs football

CCAA co-champion
- Conference: California Collegiate Athletic Association
- Record: 4–3–2 (2–0–1 CCAA)
- Head coach: James Bradshaw (6th season)
- Home stadium: Ratcliffe Stadium

1941 California Collegiate Athletic Association football standings
	Conf.					Overall
Team	W		L		T	W		L		T
San Jose State +	2	–	0	–	1	5	–	3	–	3
Fresno State +	2	–	0	–	1	4	–	3	–	2
Santa Barbara State	1	–	2	–	0	3	–	5	–	1
San Diego State	0	–	3	–	0	6	–	4	–	0
+ – Conference co-champions

The 1941 Fresno State Bulldogs football team represented Fresno State Normal School—now known as California State University, Fresno—during the 1941 college football season.

Fresno State competed in the California Collegiate Athletic Association (CCAA). The team was led by sixth-year head coach James Bradshaw and played home games at Ratcliffe Stadium on the campus of Fresno City College in Fresno, California. They finished the season as co-champions of the CCAA, with a record of four wins, three losses and two ties (4–3–2, 2–0–1 CCAA). The Bulldogs outscored their opponents 118–90 for the season, including shutting out their opponents four times.

Fresno State was ranked at No. 123 (out of 681 teams) in the final rankings under the Litkenhous Difference by Score System for 1941.

== Schedule ==
Date	Opponent	Site	Result	Attendance	Source
September 27	West Texas State*	Ratcliffe Stadium; Fresno, CA	L 6–7	11,000	
October 4	Camp Haan (CA)*	Ratcliffe Stadium; Fresno, CA	T 7–7		
October 11	at Santa Barbara State	La Playa Stadium; Santa Barbara, CA	W 26–0	5,000	
October 18	at Nevada*	Mackay Stadium (Note: This stadium is the predecessor to the current Mackay Stadium, which was opened for the 1966 season.); Reno, NV	W 6–3	4,000	
October 25	San Diego State	Ratcliffe Stadium; Fresno, CA (rivalry)	W 26–0	6,720	
November 1	San Francisco*	Ratcliffe Stadium; Fresno, CA	L 27–47	12,000	
November 11	Pacific (CA)*	Ratcliffe Stadium; Fresno, CA	W 13–0	13,000	
November 15	at San Jose State	Spartan Stadium; San Jose, CA (rivalry)	T 0–0	10,000	
November 20	Arizona State*^{†}	Ratcliffe Stadium; Fresno, CA	L 7–26	8,000	
*Non-conference game; ^{†}Homecoming

== Team players in the NFL ==
No Fresno State Bulldog players were selected in the 1942 NFL draft.

The following Fresno State Bulldog players finished their college career in 1941, were not drafted, but played in the NFL.

Player	Position	First NFL team
Len Masini	Blocking Back – Fullback – Linebacker	1947 San Francisco 49ers
