= Ben Winkelman =

American football player and coach (1899–1981)

Biographical details
- Born: February 28, 1899; Fayetteville, Arkansas, U.S.
- Died: December 18, 1981 (aged 82); Sacramento, California, U.S.
- Height: 6 ft 1 in (185 cm)
- Weight: 190 lb (86 kg; 13 st 8 lb)
- Education: University of Arkansas

Playing career
- 1917–1921: Arkansas
- 1922–1924: Milwaukee Badgers
- Position: Back / End

Coaching career (HC unless noted)
- 1925–1926: Little Rock
- (c. 1930): Central HS (TX)
- 1936–1938: Stanford (backfield)
- 1940–1941: San Jose State

Ben Hartwell Winkelman (February 28, 1899 – December 18, 1981) was an American football player and coach. He played three seasons with the Milwaukee Badgers of the National Football League (NFL). Winkelman served as the head football coach at San Jose State University from 1940 to 1941, compiling a record of 16–4–3.

== Early life ==
Winkelman was born in Fayetteville, Arkansas to father Charles Winkelman and mother Pearl O. Winkelman.

== Head coaching record ==
Year	Team	Overall	Conference	Standing	Bowl/playoffs
San Jose State Spartans (California Collegiate Athletic Association) (1940–1941)
1940	San Jose State	11–1	3–0	1st	
1941	San Jose State	5–3–3	2–0–1	T–1st	
San Jose State:		16–4–3	5–0–1		
Total:		16–4–3			
National championship Conference title Conference division title or championship game berth
