= 1941 Saint Louis Billikens football team =

American college football season

1941 Saint Louis Billikens football
- Conference: Missouri Valley Conference
- Record: 4–5–1 (1–3–1 MVC)
- Head coach: Dukes Duford (2nd season)
- Home stadium: Walsh Stadium

1941 Missouri Valley Conference football standings
| | Conf. | | | | | Overall |
| Team | W | | L | | T | W | | L | | T |
|---|---|---|---|---|---|---|---|---|---|---|
| Tulsa $ | 4 | – | 0 | – | 0 | 8 | – | 2 | – | 0 |
| Oklahoma A&M | 3 | – | 1 | – | 0 | 5 | – | 4 | – | 0 |
| Creighton | 3 | – | 2 | – | 0 | 5 | – | 5 | – | 0 |
| Saint Louis | 1 | – | 3 | – | 1 | 4 | – | 5 | – | 1 |
| Washington University | 1 | – | 3 | – | 0 | 4 | – | 5 | – | 0 |
| Drake | 0 | – | 3 | – | 1 | 4 | – | 5 | – | 1 |
$ – Conference champion

The 1941 Saint Louis Billikens football team was an American football team that represented Saint Louis University as a member of the Missouri Valley Conference (MVC) during the 1941 college football season. In its second season under head coach Dukes Duford, the team compiled a 4–5–1 record (1–3–1 against MVC opponents), finished fourth in the conference, and was outscored by a total of 150 to 100. The team played its home games at Walsh Stadium in St. Louis.

Quarterback Dick Weber was selected by the conference coaches as a first-team player on the 1941 All-Missouri Valley Conference football team.

Saint Louis was ranked at No. 143 (out of 681 teams) in the final rankings under the Litkenhous Difference by Score System for 1941.

== Schedule ==
| Date | Opponent | Site | Result | Attendance | Source |
|---|---|---|---|---|---|
| September 26 | Missouri Mines* | Walsh Stadium; St. Louis, MO | W 13–7 | 7,451 | |
| October 3 | at Creighton | Creighton Stadium; Omaha, NE | L 8–18 | 10,000 | |
| October 11 | Drake | Walsh Stadium; St. Louis, MO | T 6–6 | 5,819 | |
| October 18 | at Tulsa | Skelly Field; Tulsa, OK | L 7–33 | | |
| October 24 | at Xavier* | Walsh Stadium; St. Louis, MO | L 0–8 | 7,450 | |
| November 2 | at Loyola (CA)* | Gilmore Stadium; Los Angeles, CA | W 21–13 | 8,500 | |
| November 8 | Oklahoma A&M | Walsh Stadium; St. Louis, MO | L 7–13 | | |
| November 15 | at Texas Tech* | Tech Field; Lubbock, TX | L 6–46 | 4,000 | |
| November 22 | Wichita* | Walsh Stadium; St. Louis, MO | W 7–6 | 1,129 | |
| November 29 | Washington University | Walsh Stadium; St. Louis, MO | W 25–0 | 12,000 | |
*Non-conference game
