= 1941 Arizona State Bulldogs football team =

American college football season

1941 Arizona State Bulldogs football
- Conference: Border Conference
- Record: 5–5–1 (2–4–1 Border)
- Head coach: Dixie Howell (4th season)
- Home stadium: Goodwin Stadium

1941 Border Conference football standings
	Conf.					Overall
Team	W		L		T	W		L		T
Arizona $	5	–	0	–	0	7	–	3	–	0
Texas Tech	2	–	0	–	0	9	–	2	–	0
West Texas State	4	–	1	–	0	8	–	2	–	0
Hardin–Simmons	3	–	1	–	0	7	–	3	–	1
New Mexico	3	–	2	–	1	5	–	4	–	1
Texas Mines	3	–	4	–	0	4	–	5	–	1
Arizona State	2	–	4	–	1	5	–	1	–	1
Arizona State–Flagstaff	1	–	5	–	0	3	–	5	–	0
New Mexico A&M	0	–	6	–	0	2	–	7	–	0
$ – Conference champion

The 1941 Arizona State Bulldogs football team was an American football team that represented Arizona State Teachers College (later renamed Arizona State University) in the Border Conference during the 1941 college football season. In their fourth and final season under head coach Dixie Howell, the Bulldogs compiled a 5–5–1 record (2–4–1 against Border opponents) and were outscored by their opponents by a combined total of 137 to 111.

Center Ray Green was selected by the conference coaches as a first-team player on the 1941 All-Border Conference football team.

Arizona State was ranked at No. 179 (out of 681 teams) in the final rankings under the Litkenhous Difference by Score System.

== Schedule ==
Date	Opponent	Site	Result	Attendance	Source
September 20	at Gonzaga*	Gonzaga Stadium; Spokane, WA	W 6–0		
September 25	Texas A&I*	Goodwin Stadium; Tempe, AZ	L 7–35	8,000	
October 4	West Texas State	Goodwin Stadium; Tempe, AZ	L 7–13	4,500	
October 11	New Mexico	Goodwin Stadium; Tempe, AZ	T 0–0	4,000	
October 18	at New Mexico A&M	Quesenberry Field; Las Cruces, NM	W 19–14		
October 25	Arizona	Goodwin Stadium; Tempe, AZ (rivalry)	L 7–20	12,000	
November 1	at Colorado State–Greeley*	Greeley, CO	W 6–0	> 3,000	
November 8	Texas Mines	Goodwin Stadium; Tempe, AZ	L 0–28		
November 15	Arizona State–Flagstaff	Goodwin Stadium; Tempe, AZ	W 33–0	5,000	
November 20	at Fresno State*	Ratcliffe Stadium; Fresno, CA	W 26–7	8,000	
December 6	Hardin–Simmons	Goodwin Stadium; Tempe, AZ	L 0–20		
*Non-conference game
