= Central Texas Conference =

Junior college athletic conference in Texas

The Central Texas Conference (CTC), also called the Central Texas Junior College Conference, was a junior college athletic conference with member schools located in Texas that operated from 1933 to 1939. The conference was formed on in April 1933 with seven charter members: Decatur Baptist College (known as Dallas Baptist University), Hillsboro Junior College (now known as Hill College), John Tarleton Agricultural College (now known as Tarleton State University), North Texas Agricultural College (now known as the University of Texas at Arlington), Ranger Junior College (now known as Ranger College), Texas Military College, and Weatherford Junior College (now known as Weatherford College). Hillsboro, John Tarleton, North Texas Agricultural, Ranger, And Texas Military College withdrew from the Texas Junior College Athletic Association to form the Central Texas Conference.

The Central Texas Conference was merged into the Texas Junior College Conference in 1939.

== Yearly football standings ==
1933 Central Texas Conference football standings
	Conf.					Overall
Team	W		L		T	W		L		T
Texas Military College $	4	–	0	–	1	6	–	3	–	2
Decatur Baptist	3	–	2	–	0	6	–	3	–	0
Weatherford	2	–	2	–	1	6	–	4	–	1
North Texas Aggies	1	–	2	–	2	4	–	2	–	4
Ranger	1	–	2	–	2	3	–	3	–	4
John Tarleton	0	–	3	–	2	1	–	6	–	3
$ – Conference champion

1936 Central Texas Conference football standings
	Conf.					Overall
Team	W		L		T	W		L		T
North Texas Aggies $	4	–	0	–	0	7	–	3	–	1
Weatherford	3	–	1	–	0	5	–	4	–	0
John Tarleton	3	–	2	–	0	4	–	5	–	0
Texas Military College	1	–	1	–	0	4	–	1	–	1
Decatur Baptist	1	–	3	–	0	2	–	5	–	0
Hillsboro	0	–	5	–	0	3	–	8	–	0
$ – Conference champion; Hillsboro forfeited all of its conference games because of ineligble players.

1934 Central Texas Conference football standings
	Conf.					Overall
Team	W		L		T	W		L		T
North Texas Aggies $	3	–	0	–	1	8	–	2	–	1
Weatherford	4	–	1	–	0	7	–	3	–	0
John Tarleton	3	–	1	–	1	5	–	1	–	4
Texas Military College	1	–	2	–	0	6	–	3	–	0
Ranger	1	–	4	–	0	2	–	5	–	0
Decatur Baptist	0	–	4	–	0	2	–	5	–	0
$ – Conference champion

1937 Central Texas Conference football standings
	Conf.					Overall
Team	W		L		T	W		L		T
Weatherford $	3	–	0	–	1	5	–	5	–	1
John Tarleton	3	–	0	–	1	6	–	2	–	2
North Texas Aggies	3	–	2	–	0	6	–	4	–	0
Hillsboro	2	–	3	–	0	2	–	7	–	0
Decatur Baptist	1	–	4	–	0	2	–	6	–	2
Westminster (TX)	0	–	3	–	0	0	–	7	–	1
Championship: Weatherford 7, John Tarleton 2
+ – Conference co-champions

1935 Central Texas Conference football standings
	Conf.					Overall
Team	W		L		T	W		L		T
North Texas Aggies $	7	–	0	–	0	9	–	2	–	0
John Tarleton	6	–	1	–	0	9	–	1	–	0
Weatherford	4	–	3	–	0	5	–	3	–	0
Hillsboro	3	–	3	–	1	3	–	7	–	1
Decatur Baptist	2	–	3	–	1	2	–	5	–	1
Texas Military College	1	–	3	–	0	2	–	6	–	0
Clifton *	1	–	5	–	0	1	–	5	–	0
Ranger	0	–	6	–	0	0	–	7	–	0
$ – Conference champion; * – Did not complete for championship

1938 Central Texas Conference football standings
	Conf.					Overall
Team	W		L		T	W		L		T
North Texas Aggies $	5	–	0	–	0	10	–	1	–	0
John Tarleton	3	–	1	–	0	4	–	4	–	1
Decatur Baptist	2	–	2	–	1	3	–	4	–	2
Weatherford	1	–	2	–	1	1	–	7	–	1
Hillsboro	1	–	4	–	0	3	–	7	–	0
Westminster (TX)	0	–	3	–	0	2	–	4	–	0
$ – Conference champion
