= 1941 San Jose State Spartans football team =

American college football season

1941 San Jose State Spartans football

CCAA co-champion
- Conference: California Collegiate Athletic Association
- Record: 5–3–3 (2–0–1 CCAA)
- Head coach: Ben Winkelman (2nd season)
- Home stadium: Spartan Stadium

1941 California Collegiate Athletic Association football standings
	Conf.					Overall
Team	W		L		T	W		L		T
San Jose State +	2	–	0	–	1	5	–	3	–	3
Fresno State +	2	–	0	–	1	4	–	3	–	2
Santa Barbara State	1	–	2	–	0	3	–	5	–	1
San Diego State	0	–	3	–	0	6	–	4	–	0
+ – Conference co-champions

The 1941 San Jose State Spartans football team represented San Jose State College (Note: San Jose State University was known as San Jose State College from 1935 to 1971.) during the 1941 college football season.

San Jose State competed in the California Collegiate Athletic Association. The team was led by head coach Ben Winkelman, in his second year, and played home games at Spartan Stadium in San Jose, California. They finished the season as co-champion of the CCAA, with a record of five wins, three losses and three ties (5–3–3, 2–0–1 CCAA).

San Jose State was ranked at No. 107 (out of 681 teams) in the final rankings under the Litkenhous Difference by Score System for 1941.

The team was due to play a benefit game against Hawaii in Honolulu on December 13, 1941, which was canceled following the attack on Pearl Harbor. The team had already arrived in Hawaii, and players were assigned to police duty following the attack.

== Schedule ==
Date	Opponent	Site	Result	Attendance	Source
September 19	Texas A&I*	Spartan Stadium; San Jose, CA	W 14–7	9,000	
September 26	Utah State*	Spartan Stadium; San Jose, CA	W 30–0	9,000	
October 3	Fort Ord (Note: Fort Ord was an Army post on Monterey Bay, California from 1917 to 1994.)*	Spartan Stadium; San Jose, CA	T 6–6	12,000	
October 10	at San Diego State	Balboa Stadium; San Diego, CA	W 20–0	6,500	
October 17	Hardin–Simmons*	Spartan Stadium; San Jose, CA	T 7–7	9,000	
October 24	at Pacific (CA)*	Baxter Stadium; Stockton, CA (rivalry)	W 7–0		
October 31	Santa Barbara State	Spartan Stadium; San Jose, CA	W 33–14	4,500	
November 8	at Nevada*	Mackay Stadium (Note: This stadium is the predecessor to the current Mackay Stadium, which was opened for the 1966 season."University of Nevada, Reno; Mackay Stadium".); Reno, NV	L 19–20		
November 14	Fresno State	Spartan Stadium; San Jose, CA (rivary)	T 0–0	10,000	
November 22	at San Francisco*	Kezar Stadium; San Francisco, CA	L 0–20	8,000	
November 26	Moffett Field Air Corps (Note: Naval Air Station Moffett Field was a Naval Air Station from 1933 to 1994.)*	Spartan Stadium; San Jose, California	L 13–22		
*Non-conference game

== Team players in the NFL ==
No San Jose State players were selected in the 1942 NFL draft.
