= 1941 Oklahoma A&M Cowboys football team =

American college football season

1941 Oklahoma A&M Cowboys football
- Conference: Missouri Valley Conference
- Record: 5–4 (3–1 MVC)
- Head coach: Jim Lookabaugh (3rd season)
- Home stadium: Lewis Field

1941 Missouri Valley Conference football standings
	Conf.					Overall
Team	W		L		T	W		L		T
Tulsa $	4	–	0	–	0	8	–	2	–	0
Oklahoma A&M	3	–	1	–	0	5	–	4	–	0
Creighton	3	–	2	–	0	5	–	5	–	0
Saint Louis	1	–	3	–	1	4	–	5	–	1
Washington University	1	–	3	–	0	4	–	5	–	0
Drake	0	–	3	–	1	4	–	5	–	1
$ – Conference champion

The 1941 Oklahoma A&M Cowboys football team represented Oklahoma A&M College in the 1941 college football season. This was the 41st year of football at A&M and the third under Jim Lookabaugh. The Cowboys played their home games at Lewis Field in Stillwater, Oklahoma. They finished the season 5–4, 3–1 in the Missouri Valley Conference.

Tackle Hugh Swink and guard Sonny Liles were selected by the conference coaches as first-team players on the 1941 All-Missouri Valley Conference football team. Three other Oklahoma A&M player were named to the second team: halfback Lonnie Jones; fullback Jack Faubion; and end George Darrow.

== Schedule ==
Date	Opponent	Site	Result	Attendance	Source
September 27	at Oklahoma*	Memorial Stadium; Norman, OK (Bedlam)	L 0–19	28,000	
October 3	vs. Texas Tech*	Taft Stadium; Oklahoma City, OK	L 6–16	5,000	
October 11	at Washington University	Francis Field; St. Louis, MO	W 25–0	5,000	
October 18	Detroit*	Lewis Field; Stillwater, OK	L 14–20	6,000	
October 25	Tulsa^{†}	Lewis Field; Stillwater, OK (rivalry)	L 0–16	12,000	
November 1	Creighton	Lewis Field; Stillwater, OK	W 13–6	4,000	
November 8	at Saint Louis	Walsh Stadium; St. Louis, MO	W 13–6		
November 15	Arizona*	Lewis Field; Stillwater, OK	W 41–14	4,000	
November 27	at Wichita*	Wichita, KS	W 33–13		
*Non-conference game; ^{†}Homecoming

== After the season ==
The 1942 NFL draft was held on December 22, 1942. The following Cowboy was selected.

Round	Pick	Player	Position	NFL team
14	124	Hugh Swink	Tackle	Chicago Cardinals
