= Heartland Conference men's basketball tournament =

Heartland Conference men's basketball tournament (defunct)
- Conference basketball championship
- Sport: Basketball
- Conference: Heartland Conference
- Number of teams: 8
- Format: Single-elimination tournament
- Current stadium: Union Multipurpose Activities Center
- Current location: Tulsa, OK
- Played: 2003–2019
- Final champion: St. Edward's (3)
- Most championships: St. Mary's (TX) (6)
- Official website: Heartland men's basketball

The Heartland Conference men's basketball tournament was the annual event that concluded the men's basketball season of the Heartland Conference, an NCAA Division II league that began play in 1999 and disbanded after the 2018–19 school year. The tournament, first held in 2003 and continuing through the conference's final basketball season of 2018–19, was a single-elimination tournament, with seeding based on regular-season records.

The winner, declared conference champion, received the Heartland's automatic bid to the NCAA Division II men's basketball tournament.

Following the 2018–19 school year, seven of the nine Heartland members joined the Lone Star Conference, with the other two joining the Mid-America Intercollegiate Athletics Association.

== Tournament format ==
From its establishment in 2003, the Heartland Conference tournament typically featured a simple four-team single-elimination tournament featuring the top four teams from the conference regular season standings. An additional opening round game, featuring the fourth and fifth best teams, was played only in 2006 and 2012. In 2010, two opening round games were played, with the third-seed playing the sixth-seed and the fourth-seed playing the fifth-seed.

In most years, the tournament was held in a gymnasium on the campus of one of the Heartland Conference member schools. The only exceptions were the 2007 and 2008 tournaments, played in the home arena of North Texas from Division I.

== Results ==
Year	Champions	Score	Runner-up	Venue
2003	St. Mary's (TX)	57–47	Incarnate Word	Bill Greehey Arena (San Antonio, TX)
2004	Drury	62–58	St. Mary's (TX)	Weiser Gym (Springfield, MO)
2005	St. Mary's (TX)	59–52	Rockhurst	Bill Greehey Arena (San Antonio, TX)
2006	St. Edward's	83–77	Montana State–Billings	Recreation and Convocation Center (Austin, TX)
2007	St. Edward's	85–73	Incarnate Word	UNT Coliseum (Denton, TX)
2008	St. Mary's (TX)	79–70 ^{OT}	St. Edward's	UNT Coliseum (Denton, TX)
2009	Incarnate Word	67–55	Dallas Baptist	Bill Greehey Arena (San Antonio, TX)
2010	Incarnate Word	65–63	St. Mary's (TX)	Bill Greehey Arena (San Antonio, TX)
2011	Texas A&M International	86–67	UT Permian Basin	Bill Greehey Arena (San Antonio, TX)
2012	St. Mary's (TX)	84–70	Arkansas–Fort Smith	Kinesiology and Convocation Building (Laredo, TX)
2013	St. Mary's (TX)	85–76	Arkansas–Fort Smith	Stubblefield Center (Fort Smith, AR)
2014	Texas A&M International	76–72	Texas–Permian Basin	Stubblefield Center (Fort Smith, AR)
2015	St. Mary's (TX)	63–60	St. Edward's	Bill Greehey Arena (San Antonio, TX)
2016	Dallas Baptist	95–87 (OT)	Arkansas–Fort Smith	Union Multipurpose Activities Center (Tulsa, OK)
2017	Arkansas–Fort Smith	68–59	Dallas Baptist	Union Multipurpose Activities Center (Tulsa, OK)
2018	Dallas Baptist	77–57	Oklahoma Christian	Union Multipurpose Activities Center (Tulsa, OK)
2019	St. Edward's	69–59	Dallas Baptist	Union Multipurpose Activities Center (Tulsa, OK)

== Championship appearances by school ==
School	Finals Record	Finals Appearances	Years
St. Mary's (TX)	6–2	8	2003, 2005, 2008, 2012, 2013, 2015
Texas A&M International	2–0	2	2011, 2014
St. Edward's	3–2	5	2006, 2007, 2019
Incarnate Word	2–2	4	2009, 2010
Dallas Baptist	2–3	5	2016, 2018
Arkansas–Fort Smith	1–3	4	2017
Drury	1–0	1	2004
UT Permian Basin	0–2	2	
Oklahoma Christian	0–1	1	
Montana State–Billings	0–1	1	
Rockhurst	0–1	1	

- Among the nine final members of the Heartland Conference, Lubbock Christian, Newman, and Rogers State never reached the tournament final.
- Among teams that left before the league's final 2018–19 season, Lincoln (MO), McMurry, Oklahoma Panhandle State, and Western New Mexico never reached the finals of the Heartland Conference tournament before departing the league.
- Schools highlighted in red left the Heartland Conference prior to its final 2018–19 season.
