= Maurice H. Palrang =

American baseball player and football coach (1906–1978)

Biographical details
- Born: November 30, 1906; Boston, Massachusetts, U.S.
- Died: February 8, 1978 (aged 71); Omaha, Nebraska, U.S.
- Education: Regis College

Playing career

Baseball
- 1929: Des Moines Demons
- 1930: Norton Jayhawks

Coaching career (HC unless noted)

Football
- 1934–1939: Creighton Prep (NE)
- 1940–1942: Creighton
- 1945–1973: Boys Town (NE)

Head coaching record
- Overall: 16–11–2 (college)

Maurice Henry "Skip" Palrang (November 30, 1906 – February 8, 1978) was an American minor league baseball player and football coach. He served as the head football coach at Creighton University in Omaha, Nebraska from 1940 to 1942, compiling a record of 16–11–2. He was Creighton's final head football coach before the program folded after the 1942 season. After World War II, Palrang served as the head football and basketball coach at Boys Town, Nebraska.

== Head coaching record ==
=== College ===
| Year | Team | Overall | Conference | Standing |
|---|---|---|---|---|
Creighton Bluejays (Missouri Valley Conference) (1940–1942)
| 1940 | Creighton | 6–2–2 | 2–2 | T–3rd |
| 1941 | Creighton | 5–5 | 3–2 | 3rd |
| 1942 | Creighton | 5–4 | 1–4 | T–5th |
| Creighton: | | 16–11–2 | 6–8 | |
| Total: | | 16–11–2 | | |
