= 1941 Drake Bulldogs football team =

American college football season

1941 Drake Bulldogs football
- Conference: Missouri Valley Conference
- Record: 4–5–1 (0–3–1 MVC)
- Head coach: Vee Green (9th season)
- Home stadium: Drake Stadium

1941 Missouri Valley Conference football standings
	Conf.					Overall
Team	W		L		T	W		L		T
Tulsa $	4	–	0	–	0	8	–	2	–	0
Oklahoma A&M	3	–	1	–	0	5	–	4	–	0
Creighton	3	–	2	–	0	5	–	5	–	0
Saint Louis	1	–	3	–	1	4	–	5	–	1
Washington University	1	–	3	–	0	4	–	5	–	0
Drake	0	–	3	–	1	4	–	5	–	1
$ – Conference champion

The 1941 Drake Bulldogs football team represented Drake University in the Missouri Valley Conference (MVC) during the 1941 college football season. In its ninth season under head coach Vee Green, the team compiled a 4–5–1 record (0–3–1 against MVC opponents), finished in last place in the MVC, and was outscored by a total of 134 to 83. The team played its home games at Drake Stadium in Des Moines, Iowa.

Guard Leonard Adams was selected by the conference coaches as first-team player on the 1941 All-Missouri Valley Conference football team.

Drake was ranked at No. 166 (out of 681 teams) in the final rankings under the Litkenhous Difference by Score System.

== Schedule ==
Date	Opponent	Site	Result	Attendance	Source
September 20	St. Ambrose*	Drake Stadium; Des Moines, IA	W 21–6		
September 27	at Iowa*	Iowa Stadium; Iowa City, IA	L 8–25	20,000	
October 4	Grinnell*	Drake Stadium; Des Moines, IA	W 8–0		
October 11	at Saint Louis	Walsh Stadium; St. Louis, MO	T 6–6	5,819	
October 18	at Illinois*	Memorial Stadium; Champaign, IL	L 0–40	12,000–12,193	
October 25	at Creighton	Creighton Stadium; Omaha, NE	L 7–12		
November 1	Washington University	Drake Stadium; Des Moines, IA	L 0–12		
November 8	Iowa State Teachers*	Drake Stadium; Des Moines, IA (rivalry)	W 13–0	3,500	
November 15	Iowa State*^{†}	Drake Stadium; Des Moines, IA	W 14–13	7,500	
November 22	at Tulsa	Skelly Field; Tulsa, OK	L 6–20	2,500	
*Non-conference game; ^{†}Homecoming
