= 1941 Washington University Bears football team =

American college football season

1941 Washington University Bears football
- Conference: Missouri Valley Conference
- Record: 4–5 (1–3 MVC)
- Head coach: Frank Loebs (2nd season)
- Home stadium: Francis Field

1941 Missouri Valley Conference football standings
	Conf.					Overall
Team	W		L		T	W		L		T
Tulsa $	4	–	0	–	0	8	–	2	–	0
Oklahoma A&M	3	–	1	–	0	5	–	4	–	0
Creighton	3	–	2	–	0	5	–	5	–	0
Saint Louis	1	–	3	–	1	4	–	5	–	1
Washington University	1	–	3	–	0	4	–	5	–	0
Drake	0	–	3	–	1	4	–	5	–	1
$ – Conference champion

The 1941 Washington University Bears football team represented Washington University in St. Louis as a member of the Missouri Valley Conference (MVC) during the 1941 college football season. In their second and final season under head coach Frank Loebs, the Bears compiled a 4–5 record (1–3 against MVC opponents), finished fifth in the MVC, and were outscored by a total of 165 to 150. The team played its home games at Francis Field in St. Louis.

The team was led by senior halfback Bud Schwenk. During the 1941 season, Schwenk broke the national collegiate single-season records for completed passes (114) and yards of total offense (1,928). Schwenk also led the nation in 1941 with 1,457 passing yards.

Washington University was ranked at No. 198 (out of 681 teams) in the final rankings under the Litkenhous Difference by Score System.

== Schedule ==
Date	Time	Opponent	Site	Result	Attendance	Source
October 4		at Kansas*	Memorial Stadium; Lawrence, KS	L 6–19		
October 11		Oklahoma A&M	Francis Field; St. Louis, MO	L 12–41	5,000	
October 18	2:30 p.m.	Creighton^{†}	Francis Field; St. Louis, MO	L 13–14	3,500	
October 25		at Centenary*	Louisiana State Fair; Shreveport, LA	W 13–7	1,500	
October 31		at Drake	Drake Stadium; Des Moines, IA	W 12–0		
November 8		Illinois College*	Francis Field; St. Louis, MO	W 53–12	1,500	
November 15		at Butler*	Butler Bowl; Indianapolis, IN	L 13–40	9,000	
November 20		Missouri Mines*	Francis Field; St. Louis, MO	W 28–7	6,000	
November 29		at Saint Louis	Walsh Stadium; St. Louis, MO	L 0–25	12,000	
*Non-conference game; ^{†}Homecoming; All times are in Central time
