= 1941 Arizona Wildcats football team =

American college football season

1941 Arizona Wildcats football

Border champion
- Conference: Border Conference
- Record: 7–3 (5–0 Border)
- Head coach: Mike Casteel (3rd season)
- Captain: Emil Banjavicic
- Home stadium: Arizona Stadium

1941 Border Conference football standings
	Conf.					Overall
Team	W		L		T	W		L		T
Arizona $	5	–	0	–	0	7	–	3	–	0
Texas Tech	2	–	0	–	0	9	–	2	–	0
West Texas State	4	–	1	–	0	8	–	2	–	0
Hardin–Simmons	3	–	1	–	0	7	–	3	–	1
New Mexico	3	–	2	–	1	5	–	4	–	1
Texas Mines	3	–	4	–	0	4	–	5	–	1
Arizona State	2	–	4	–	1	5	–	1	–	1
Arizona State–Flagstaff	1	–	5	–	0	3	–	5	–	0
New Mexico A&M	0	–	6	–	0	2	–	7	–	0
$ – Conference champion

The 1941 Arizona Wildcats football team was an American football team that represented the University of Arizona in the Border Conference during the 1941 college football season. In their third season under head coach Mike Casteel, the Wildcats compiled a 7–3 record (5–0 against Border opponents), finished in a tie for the conference championship, and outscored opponents, 253 to 146.

Halfback Emil Banjavicic was the team captain. Three Arizona players were selected by the conference coaches as first-team players on the 1941 All-Border Conference football team: end Henry Stanton; tackle Jock Irish; and guard Stanley Petropolis. Halfbacks Banjavicic and William Smetana and center Murl McCain were selected to the second team.

Arizona was ranked at No. 87 (out of 681 teams) in the final rankings under the Litkenhous Difference by Score System for 1941.

The team played its home games at Arizona Stadium in Tucson, Arizona.

== Schedule ==
Date	Opponent	Site	Result	Attendance	Source
September 27	at Notre Dame*	Notre Dame Stadium; South Bend, IN	L 7–38	30,000	
October 4	New Mexico A&M	Arizona Stadium; Tucson, AZ	W 47–0	7,500	
October 11	Nevada*	Arizona Stadium; Tucson, AZ	W 26–7	9,000	
October 18	at New Mexico	Hilltop Stadium; Albuquerque, NM (rivalry)	W 31–6	4,000	
October 25	at Arizona State	Goodwin Stadium; Tempe, AZ (rivalry)	W 20–7	12,000	
November 1	Texas Mines	Arizona Stadium; Tucson, AZ	W 33–14	9,000	
November 8	Arizona State–Flagstaff	Arizona Stadium; Tucson, AZ	W 41–0	5,500	
November 15	at Oklahoma A&M*	Lewis Field; Stillwater, OK	L 14–41	4,000	
November 29	Kansas State*	Arizona Stadium; Tucson, AZ	W 28–21	9,000	
December 6	Utah*	Arizona Stadium; Tucson, AZ	L 6–12	8,500	
*Non-conference game
