= Morris Stone =

American football coach

Playing career
- 1981: Angelo State
- Position: Linebacker

Coaching career (HC unless noted)
- 1987–1988: Midwestern State (LB/ST)
- 1989–1990: Texas Tech (GA/DE)
- 1991: Ball HS (TX) (OL)
- 1992–1993: West Texas A&M (AHC)
- 1994–1996: West Texas A&M
- 1997–1998: Lake Dallas HS (TX)

Head coaching record
- Overall: 15–17 (college)

Morris Stone is an American former football coach. He served as the head football coach at West Texas A&M University from 1994 to 1996, compiling a record of 15–17.

Stone lettered in five sports at Seymour High School in Seymour, Texas. He played college football as a linebacker at Angelo State University in San Angelo, Texas in 1981 and the University of Oklahoma in 1982 before his playing career ended due to injury. Stone graduated from Midwestern State University in Wichita Falls, Texas in 1986.

Stone was named head coach in April 1994, after serving as interim head coach for about a month. He guided the Buffaloes to a 9–2 season in 1994 and was named Panhandle Sports Hall of Fame Coach of the Year. After West Texas A&M went 5–6 and 1–9, respectively, in 1995 and 1996, Stone resigned.

== Head coaching record ==
=== College ===
Year	Team	Overall	Conference	Standing	Bowl/playoffs
West Texas A&M Buffaloes (NCAA Division II independent) (1994)
1994	West Texas A&M	9–2			
West Texas A&M Buffaloes (Lone Star Conference) (1995–1996)
1995	West Texas A&M	5–6	1–6	7th	
1996	West Texas A&M	1–9	0–7	8th	
West Texas A&M:		15–17	1–13		
Total:		15–17			
