= Texas Military College =

Private college and school in Terrell, Texas, U.S.

Texas Military College (TMC) was a private junior college, high school, and primary school located in Terrell, Texas, that operated from 1915 to 1949. The college was founded and owned by Louis Clausiel Perry, who served as president until 1926. Perry retired in the fall of 1926 due to failing health was succeeded as president by Odie Minatra, who previously served as superintendent of the State Orphans Home in Corsicana, Texas. Perry died of cancer, on November 2, 1926, at the college. His widow, Minnie E. Perry, ran the school until 1949, when she sold the school's property to the Southern Bible Institute, which established Southwestern Christian College.

== Student activities ==
The college had a chapter of Theta Kappa Omega.

== Notable alumni ==
- Jack Lummus, professional football player, United States Marine Corps officer
