= West Texas A&M Buffaloes football =

Intercollegiate American football team

- First season: 1910; 116 years ago
- Head coach: Josh Lynn; 2nd season, 8–13 (.381)
- Location: Canyon, Texas
- Stadium: Bain–Schaeffer Buffalo Stadium (capacity: 8,500–12,000)
- NCAA division: Division II
- Conference: Lone Star Conference
- Colors: Maroon and white
- Bowl record: 6–0 (1.000)

Conference championships
- 11 (5 Lone Star Conference 3 Missouri Valley Conference, 2 Alamo Conference, 1 Border)

Division championships
- 4
- Website: gobuffsgo.com/football

The West Texas A&M Buffaloes football program is the intercollegiate American football team for the West Texas A&M University located in the U.S. state of Texas. The team competes in Division II and are members of the Lone Star Conference. The school's first football team was fielded in 1910. Since 2019, the Buffaloes have played their home games at the 8,500 seat on-campus Bain–Schaeffer Buffalo Stadium. The team formerly played at the 20,000 seat Kimbrough Memorial Stadium. They are coached by Josh Lynn.

== Notable former players ==
Notable alumni include:

- Ralph Anderson
- Anthony Armstrong
- John Ayres
- Grady Benton
- Carl Birdsong
- Tully Blanchard
- Cloyce Box
- Bryan Braman
- Stephen Burton
- Eric Collins
- Ted DiBiase
- Bobby Duncum Sr.
- Dory Funk Jr.
- Terry Funk
- Frank Goodish
- Stan Hansen
- Kareem Larrimore
- Jerry Logan
- Ron Mayo
- Reggie McElroy
- Mercury Morris
- Jesse Powell
- Bo Robinson
- Khiry Robinson
- Virgil Runnels
- Eugene Sims
- Merced Solis
- Duane Thomas
- Chaun Thompson
- Rocky Thompson
- J'Marcus Webb
- Ethan Westbrooks

== Conference championships ==
Season	Coach	Conference	Record
1939	Alfred Baggett	Alamo Conference (co-champions)	5–3–1
1940	Jack Curtice	Alamo Conference	7–3
1950	Frank Kimbrough	Border Conference	10–1
1977	Bill Yung	Missouri Valley Conference	6–4–1
1979	Bill Yung	Missouri Valley Conference	5–5–1
1986	Bill Kelly	Lone Star Conference	7–4
2005	Don Carthel	Lone Star Conference	10–2
2006	Don Carthel	Lone Star Conference	11–2
2007	Don Carthel	Lone Star Conference	12–1
2012	Don Carthel	Lone Star Conference	12–3

== Classification history ==
- 1910–1955 – NCAA
- 1956–1972 – NCAA University Division (Major College)
- 1973–1977 – NCAA Division I
- 1978–1981 – NCAA Division I-A
- 1982–1985 – NCAA Division I-AA
- 1986–1990 – NCAA Division II
- 1991 – No team
- 1992–present – NCAA Division II

== Conference history ==
- 1910–1924 – Independent
- 1925–1930 – Texas Intercollegiate Athletic Association
- 1931–1938 – Independent
- 1939–1940 – Alamo Conference
- 1941–1961 – Border Conference
- 1962–1971 – Independent
- 1972–1985 – Missouri Valley Conference
- 1986–1990 – Lone Star Conference
- 1992–1994 – Division II Independent
- 1995–present – Lone Star Conference

== Postseason ==
=== Bowl appearances ===
West Texas A&M participated in four bowl games, all while during known as West Texas State. They went 4–0.

Season	Coach	Bowl	Opponent	Result
1950	Frank Kimbrough	Sun Bowl	Cincinnati	W 14–13
1956	Frank Kimbrough	Tangerine Bowl	Mississippi Southern	W 20–13
1962	Joe Kerbel	Sun Bowl	Ohio	W 15–14
1967	Joe Kerbel	Pasadena Bowl	Valley State	W 35–13

They have also competed in three Division II bowls. The Kanza Bowl was a bowl game between the Lone Star Conference and the Mid-America Intercollegiate Athletics Association from 2009–2012, with the Buffs going 2–0. The Buffs have also played in the Heritage Bowl against the Great American Conference.

Season	Coach	Bowl	Opponent	Result
2009	Don Carthel	Kanza Bowl	Nebraska–Omaha	W 31–25
2011	Don Carthel	Kanza Bowl	Central Missouri	W 26–7
2025	Josh Lynn	Heritage Bowl (Corsicana)	Arkansas Tech	W 28–27

=== NCAA Division II playoffs ===
Semifinals
2012
Quarterfinals
2012, 2013
Second Round
2006, 2007, 2008, 2012, 2013
First Round
2006, 2007, 2008, 2010, 2012, 2013

== Rivalries ==
=== Eastern New Mexico: Wagon Wheel ===
The Wagon Wheel is a traveling trophy that is given to the winner of the Eastern New Mexico–West Texas A&M football game. The trophy was introduced in 1986 by Dallan Sanders, the Housing Director at ENMU. The wheel is placed on the stadium hill of the host team with the winning team running up the hill to take possession of the wheel. Following the 2023 meeting, ENMU leads the overall series 23–19 and the trophy series 18–17.

=== East Texas A&M University: East Texas vs. West Texas ===
East Texas vs. West Texas is the name given to the East Texas A&M–West Texas A&M football rivalry game. The intensity of the rivalry grew during 2013 through 2018 as the head coach for ETAMU at the time was Colby Carthel, who previously served as the defensive coordinator at WT under head coach Don Carthel, Colby's father. East Texas A&M leads the all-time series 21–14. The rivalry has become largely defunct as East Texas A&M moved to the Southland Conference, which competes at the NCAA Division I Football Championship Subdivision level, beginning with the 2022 season.

== Head coaches ==
Don Carthel has the most all-time wins for the Buffaloes, who have gone 541–536–21 through the 2023 season.

Coach	Record	Tenure
Josh Lynn	8–13	2023–present
Hunter Hughes	32–28	2017–2022
Mike Nesbitt	25–17	2013–2016
Don Carthel	79–22	2005–2012
Ronnie Jones	5–27	2002–2004
Stan McGarvey	25–30	1997–2001
Morris Stone	15–17	1994–1996
Ron Steele	4–15	1992–1993
Football Not Fielded	N/A	1991
Steve Graf	6–26	1988–1990
Bill Kelly	18–13–1	1985–1987
Don Davis	6–26–1	1982–1984
Bill Yung	26–27–2	1977–1981
Gene Mayfield	24–39–2	1971–1976
Joe Kerbel	68–42–1	1960–1970
Clark Jarnagin	2–18	1958–1959
Frank Kimbrough	54–52–2	1947–1957
Windy Nicklaus	2–1	1946
Gus Miller	9–13	1944–1946
World War II	N/A	1943
Gus Miller	7–2	1942
Jack Curtice	15–5	1940–1941
Alfred Baggett	36–28–4	1933–1939
Samuel D. Burton	10–5–2	1931–1932
Claude Reeds	12–6–1	1929–1930
W. Mitchell Jones	3–6	1928
Ox Eckhardt	12–13–1	1925–1927
Samuel D. Burton	13–21–2	1921–1924
Wayne McCorkle	1–5–1	1920
Walter Willy	4–2	1919
Lt. Alonzo P. George	3–0	1918
Douglas A. Shirley	14–16–1	1913–1917
Jim G. Miller	8–6	1910–1911
