= Creighton Bluejays football =

- First season: 1900; 126 years ago
- Last season: 1942; 84 years ago
- Location: Omaha, Nebraska
- Stadium: Creighton Stadium
- Colors: Blue, white, and navy blue
- All-time record: 187–143–28 (.561)

Conference championships
- 3
- Fight song: The White and the Blue

Although the first team photo is from 1893, the actual first season of Creighton Bluejays football was in 1900. The university fielded a varsity football team every season from 1900 to 1942.

== Nickname ==
Creighton adopted a Bluejay as its mascot in 1924, when the university's athletic board selected the name from submissions for a contest run by the Omaha Bee.

== Conference championships ==
Creighton won three conference titles. The Bluejays won two North Central Conference championships and one Missouri Valley Conference championship.

Conference	Years
North Central Conference	1925, 1927
Missouri Valley Conference	1936
Total	3 conference championships

== Record against Missouri Valley Conference opponents ==
Rival	Name	Record (W–L–T)
Drake	Bulldogs	8–8–2
Oklahoma A&M	Cowboys	6–11–1
Saint Louis	Billikens	6–9–0
Tulsa	Golden Hurricane	0–5–0
Washburn	Ichabods	2–1–0
Washington University in St. Louis	Bears	4–4–0

== See also ==
- List of Creighton Bluejays football seasons
