= St. Mary's Rattlers =

Intercollegiate sports teams of St. Mary's University, Texas

- University: St. Mary's University
- Nickname: Rattlers
- NCAA: Division II
- Conference: LSC (primary)
- Athletic director: Robert Coleman
- Location: San Antonio, Texas
- Varsity teams: 13 (5 men's, 7 women's, 1 co-ed)
- Basketball arena: Bill Greehey Arena
- Baseball stadium: Dickson Stadium
- Softball stadium: St. Mary's Softball Stadium
- Soccer stadium: Sigma Beta Chi Field
- Tennis venue: Rohrbach Stadium Tennis Complex
- Colors: Blue and gold
- Website: rattlerathletics.com
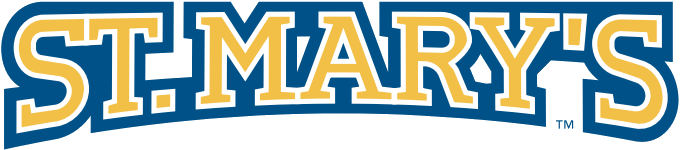

The St. Mary's Rattlers are the athletic teams that represent St. Mary's University, Texas, located in San Antonio, Texas, United States in NCAA Division II intercollegiate sporting competitions. The Rattlers compete as members of the Lone Star Conference for all 11 varsity sports. St. Mary's was a member of the Heartland Conference from 1999 to 2019.

== Sports sponsored ==
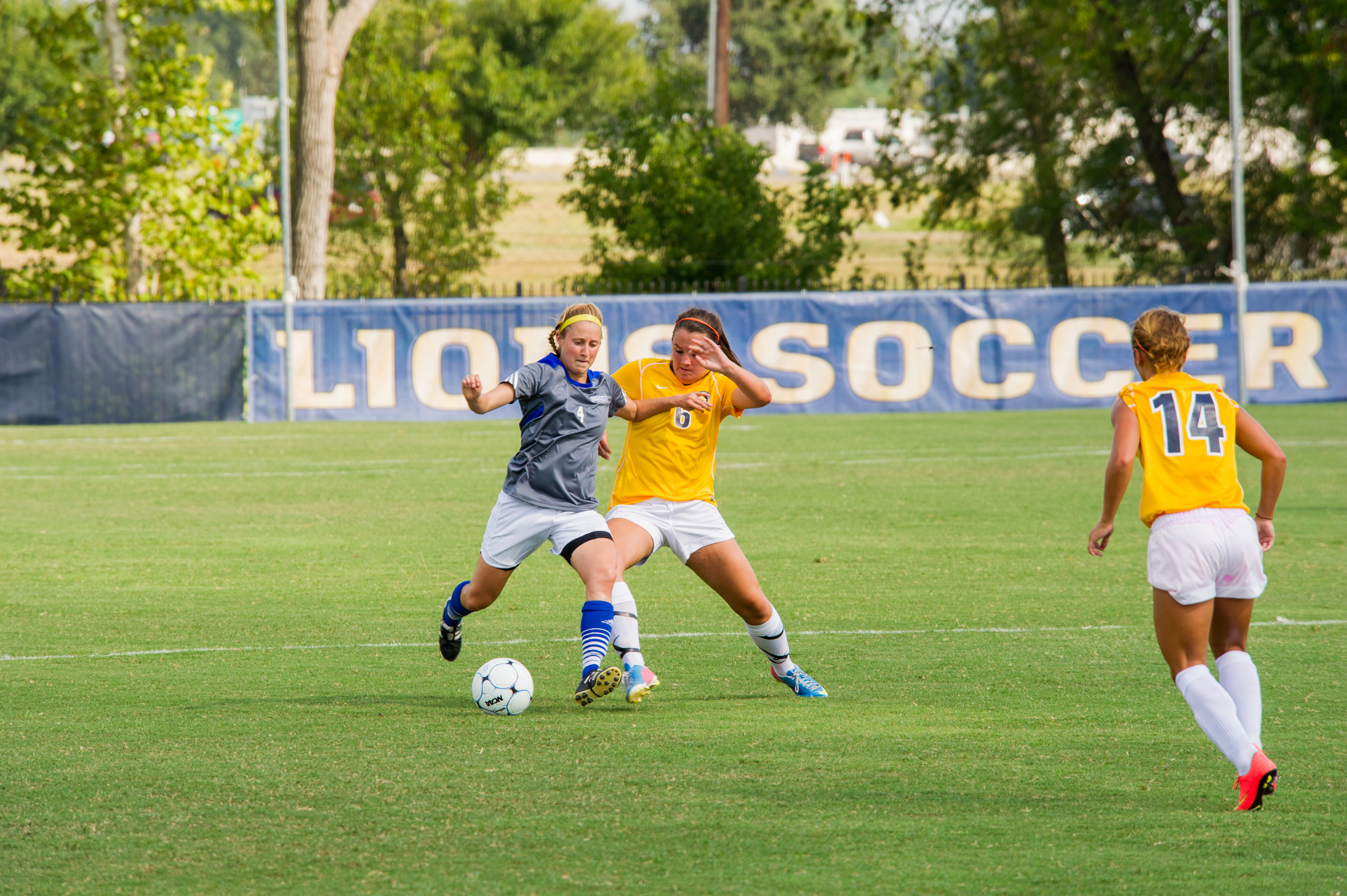
The Rattlers women's soccer team in action against the Texas A&M–Commerce Lions in 2014

Men's sports	Women's sports
Basketball	Basketball
Baseball	Softball
Golf	Golf
Soccer	Soccer
Tennis	Tennis
	Volleyball

== History ==
Before St. Mary's was recognized as a senior college in 1925, there was no formal conference competition, so the rivalry between the downtown and Woodlawn campuses was fierce. St. Mary's was an all-male school for more than a century. Women's intercollegiate athletics, begun in 1968, have enjoyed many triumphs.

=== Conference affiliations ===
Conference	Years
Alamo Conference	1936–1942
Big State Conference	1952–1987
Heart of Texas Conference	1988–1999
NCAA Division II independent	2000
Heartland Conference	2001–2019
Lone Star Conference	2020–present

== Baseball ==
Interscholastic athletics competition began with baseball in 1902. The colorful history of St. Mary's athletics includes a stellar 1910 baseball team, which lost only to Ty Cobb's Detroit Tigers in an exhibition game, Records show the 1902 baseball team went 6–0, and the 1910 squad also went undefeated except for the aforementioned game against the Tigers. With the onset of the Depression, intercollegiate baseball disappeared only to be resurrected in 1947 by then-athletics director Brother Bill Siemer, S.M. Over the years, St. Mary's baseball has won local, regional and national fame. Accomplishments include 24 conference championships, four NAIA College World Series appearances and, most recently, the 2001 NCAA Division II conference, regional and national championships.

=== Coaches ===
- Bill Siemer 1947-1953
- Eugene Gittinger 1954
- Jim Heiser 1955-1956
- Elmer Kosub 1957-1960, 1964-1986
- Mel Barborak 1961-1963
- Charlie Migl 1987-2021
- Chris Ermis 2022-2023
- Frank Kellner 2023-Present

== Basketball ==
=== Men's basketball ===
St. Mary's men's basketball program also has enjoyed success over many years. In 1926, the school's first intercollegiate basketball team posted a 12–7 record. NAIA held district tournaments between 1951-1992. Conference championship tournaments supplanted them in 1993.

Heartland Conference Regular Season Champions 2001, 2003, 2005, 2008, 2012, 2013, 2015

=== Record ===
Record table
Season	Coach	Overall	Conference	Standing	Postseason
Independent (1925–1928)
1924-25	James Clifford; Edward Barrett	7-4^{[Note A]}			
1925-26	Tom O’Donnell	13-6			
1926-27	Tom O’Donnell	11-9			
1927-28	Tim Griesenbeck	9-10			
No Team (1928–29)
Independent (1929–1931)
1929-30	Barlow Irvin	9-2			
1930-31	Barlow Irvin	8-6			
No Team (1932–1935)
Alamo Conference (1935–1942)
1935-36	Frank Bridges	5-10	2-6		
1936-37	Frank Bridges	4-14	0-6		
1937-38	Frank Bridges	3-10	0-4		
1938-39	Frank Bridges	15-11	5-3	T-1st	
1939-40	J.C. “Mose” Simms	11-10	2-4		
1940-41	Sam Harshany	14-7	5-3		
1941-42	Lloyd Russell	5-4			
No Team (1943–1946)
Independent (1946–1951)
1946-47	Br. Bill Siemer	8-10			
1947-48	Br. Bill Siemer	10-8			
1948-49	Br. Bill Siemer	8+12			
1949-50	Br. Bill Siemer	11-15			
1950-51	Br. Bill Siemer	7-18			
Big State Conference (1951–1978)
1951-52	Br. Bill Siemer	14-13	6-6		
1952-53	Br. Bill Siemer	7-17	2-8		
1953-54	Br. Bill Siemer; Br. Gene Gittinger	12-15^{[Note B]}	3-7		
1954-55	Jim Heiser	15-11	4-6		
1955-56	Jim Heiser	10-14	3-7		
1956-57	Jim Heiser	11-14	4-6		
1957-58	Jim Heiser	18-8	7-3		
1958-59	Jim Heiser	19-7	6-2	1st	District IV finals
1959-60	Jim Heiser	14-11	4-4		
1960-61	Mel Barborak	11-15	2-6		
1961-62	Mel Barborak	17-7	8-2		
1962-63	Mel Barborak	7-16	4-4		
1963-64	Ed Messbarger	22-9	8-2	1st	NAIA Tournament Elite Eight
1964-65	Ed Messbarger	10-11	5-3		
1965-66	Ed Messbarger	14-11	7-3		
1966-67	Ed Messbarger	22-9	8-2	1st	NAIA Tournament Elite Eight
1967-68	Ed Messbarger	18-11	10-0	1st	District IV finals
1968-69	Ed Messbarger	12-13	8-2	1st	District IV finals
1969-70	Ed Messbarger	20-5	10-0	1st	District IV finals
1970-71	Ed Messbarger	17-9	8-2	1st	District IV finals
1971-72	Ed Messbarger	17-12	10-2	1st	District IV finals
1972-73	Ed Messbarger	23-7	12-0	1st	District IV finals
1973-74	Ed Messbarger	24-9	11-1	1st	NAIA Tournament Final Four
1974-75	Ed Messbarger	26-7	12-0	1st	NAIA Tournament Final Four
1975-76	Ed Messbarger	22-6	10-2	1st	District IV finals
1976-77	Ed Messbarger	23-6	11-1	1st	District IV finals
1977-78	Ed Messbarger	16-10	8-2	1st	District IV semifinals
1978-79	Buddy Meyer	19-8	9-1	1st	District IV finals
1979-80	Buddy Meyer	11-13	6-5		
1980-81	Buddy Meyer	19-9	12-0	1st	NAIA tournament first round
1981-82	Buddy Meyer	19-10	8-4	1st	NAIA Tournament Second Round
1982-83	Buddy Meyer	26-7	10-0	1st	NAIA Tournament Second Round
1983-84	Buddy Meyer	25-8	10-0	1st	NAIA Tournament Second Round
1984-85	Buddy Meyer	22-7	9-1	1st	district IV finals
1985-86	Buddy Meyer	16-12	8-2	1st	district IV finals
1986-87	Buddy Meyer	27-5	9-1	1st	NAIA Tournament Second Round
1987-88	Buddy Meyer	19-7	9-1	1st	District IV finals
1988-89	Buddy Meyer	28-5	9-1	1st	NAIA Tournament Champions
1989-90	Buddy Meyer	21-9	9-1	1st	District IV finals
1990-91	Buddy Meyer	21-9	8-2	1st	NAIA Tournament Second Round
1991-92	Buddy Meyer	18-11	8-2	1st	District IV semifinals
1992-93	Buddy Meyer	12-15	4-6		
1993-94	Buddy Meyer	21-10	6-4		
1994-95	Buddy Meyer	24-6	12-2		
1995-96	Buddy Meyer	18-11	9-5	1st	NAIA Tournament First Round
1996-97	Buddy Meyer	22-7	15-1	1st	NAIA Tournament First Round
1997-98	Buddy Meyer	20-7	10-4	1st	NAIA Tournament First Round
1998-99	Buddy Meyer	13-14	5-5		
Heartland Conference (1999–2015)
1999-2000	Buddy Meyer	16-11	7-3		
2000-01	Buddy Meyer	20-8	9-3	T-1	NCAA Div II Tournament First Round
2001-02	Buddy Meyer	11-15	2-8		
2002-03	Buddy Meyer	17-13	10-2		NCAA Div II Tournament First Round
2003-04	Buddy Meyer	19-10	9-3		NCAA Div II Tournament First Round
2004-05	Buddy Meyer	23-7	11-1		NCAA Div II Tournament First Round
2005-06	Jim Zeleznak	14-14	7-5		
2006-07	Jim Zeleznak	19-9	8-4		
2007-08	Jim Zeleznak	17-13	6-4	T-2nd	NCAA Div II Tournament First Round
2008-09	Jim Zeleznak	17-11	12-4		
2009-10	Jim Zeleznak	17-13	10-6	T-3rd	Heartland Conference tourney runner-up
2010-11	Jim Zeleznak	15-12	7-5	T-3rd	
2011-12	Jim Zeleznak	19–9	11-4	T-2nd	NCAA Div II Tournament First Round
2012-13	Jim Zeleznak	23-8	9-5	T-2nd	NCAA Div II Tournament Sweet 16
2013-14	Jim Zeleznak	19–9	12-6	T-3rd	NCAA Div II Tournament First Round
2014-15	Jim Zeleznak	20–10	15-5	1st	NCAA Div II Tournament First Round
2015-16	Jim Zeleznak	10-19	6-14	9th	
2016-17	Jim Zeleznak	12-18	8-10	7th	
2017-18	Jim Zeleznak	7-21	3-13	9th	
2018-19	Jim Zeleznak	12-17	4-12	T-7th	
Lone Star Conference (2019–present)
2019-20	Jim Zeleznak	12-16	8-14	4th South div	
2020-21	Jim Zeleznak	4-8	1-4	5th South div	
2021-22	Jim Zeleznak	12-13	9-5	T-4th	
Total:					
National champion Postseason invitational champion Conference regular season champion Conference regular season and conference tournament champion Division regular season champion Division regular season and conference tournament champion Conference tournament champion

^A. James Clifford went 1–2 and Edward Barret went 6-2 as head coaches, respectively.
^B. Br. Bill Siemer went 3-5 and Br. Gene Gittinger went 9-10 as head coaches, respectively.

=== Women's basketball ===
The school hosted the NCAA Women's Division II Basketball Championship at the Bill Greehey Arena in 2009, 2012 and 2013.

=== Record ===
Record table
Season	Team	Overall	Conference	Standing	Postseason
Heartland Conference (1999–2019)
1999–2000	Jeff Van Auken	18-8			
2000–01	Jeff Van Auken	19-7	8-3		
2001–02	Paige Clawson	26-3	10-0	1st	NCAA Div II sweet sixteen
2002–03	Paige Clawson	22-7	8-2		NCAA Div II first round
2003–04	Paige Clawson	17-11	9-3		
2004–05	Paige Clawson	12-15	5-7		
2005–06	Paige Clawson	17-13	8-4		
2006–07	Jason Martens	12-16	5-5		
2007–08	Jason Martens	25-5	14-0	1st	NCAA Div II first round
2008–09	Jason Martens	24-6	12-2	1st	NCAA Div II first round
2009–10	Jason Martens	22-8	11-3	2nd	NCAA Div II first round
2010–11	Jason Martens	15-12	7-3	3rd	
2011–12	Jason Martens	13-16	8-4	4th	
2012–13	Jason Martens	22-7	10-2	2nd	NCAA Div II first round
2013–14	Jason Martens	20-10	13-7	T-3rd	NCAA Div II second round
2014–15	Jason Martens	16-11	10-8	3rd	
2015–16	Jason Martens	18-10	11-7	5th	
2016–17	Jason Martens	21-7	12-4	T-2nd	
2017–18	Jason Martens	16-13	9-5	3rd	
2018–19	Jason Martens	18-10	7-7	T-3rd	
Lone Star Conference (2019–Present)
2019–20	Jason Martens	14-14	12-10	2nd South div	Lone Star Tournament quarterfinals
2020–21	Jason Martens	6-9	6-8	2nd South div	
2021–22	Jason Martens	3-25	2-14	17th	
Total:					
National champion Postseason invitational champion Conference regular season champion Conference regular season and conference tournament champion Division regular season champion Division regular season and conference tournament champion Conference tournament champion

== Golf ==
St. Mary's first individual national championship came in 2006, when Jamie Amoretti won the NCAA Division II Men's Golf title. The Men's Golf team would be named the Golf Coaches Association of America 2008–2009 Academic National Champions, a title which St. Mary's treats as a fifth team national championship.

== Football ==
In 1916, the football team was coached by future U.S. president Dwight Eisenhower. In 1939, both Collier's and Life magazines feature full-page spreads on the St. Mary's football team and their cross country trips in a ragged bus, the "Blue Goose". The team was disbanded due to World War II. Following the end of intercollegiate football at the start of World War II, there have been at least three attempts to revive full-contact sports on campus: a club football team in the early 1970s, a club rugby team in the early 1990s, and a Texas Rugby Union Collegiate Division III team formed in Fall 2010.

=== Record ===
Year	Coach	Overall	Conference	Standing	Bowl/playoffs
No coach (Independent) (1909–1914)
Unknown (Independent) (1914–1915)
Dwight Eisenhower (Independent) (1916)
1916	Dwight Eisenhower				
Tom O'Donnell (Independent) (1925)
1925	Tom O'Donnell				
Paul Daily (Independent) (1926)
1926	Paul Daily	2-4-1			
Tim Griesenbeck (Independent) (1927)
1927	Tim Griesenbeck				
Jim Kendrick (Independent) (1928)
1928	Jim Kendrick				
Barlow Irvin (Independent) (1929–1930)
1929	Barlow Irvin	8-1			
1930	Barlow Irvin				
No school team (club level) (1931–1934)
Frank Bridges (Independent) (1935)
1935	Frank Bridges	6–4–1			
Frank Bridges (Alamo Conference) (1936–1939)
1936	Frank Bridges	7–3–2	1–1	T–1st	
1937	Frank Bridges	7–2–2	1–0–1	T–1st	
1938	Frank Bridges	6–9	0–2	3rd	
1939	Frank Bridges	5–4–2	1–2	3rd	
Frank Bridges:		31–22–7	3–5–1		
Mose Simms (Alamo Conference) (1940)
1940	Mose Simms	4-6-1	0-2	3rd	
Lloyd Russell (Alamo Conference) (1941)
1941	Lloyd Russell	7-4-1	0-1	2nd	
Total:					
National championship Conference title Conference division title or championship game berth

== Softball ==
The softball team has led the way, winning several conference titles, playing in the NAIA and NCAA Division II national tournaments, and winning the 1986 NAIA National Championship and the 2002 Division II National Championship.

== Athletics honors ==
Basketball head coach and athletics director Herman A “Buddy” Meyer has also been inducted into the Heartland Conference Hall of Fame.

== National championships ==
St. Mary's has won four team national championships in men's basketball (1989), baseball (2001), softball (1986 and 2002), and one individual national title in men's golf (2006).

=== Team (4) ===
Association	Division	Sport	Year	Opponent	Score
NAIA	Division I	Softball	1986	Oklahoma City	2-1
NAIA	Division I	Basketball	1989	East Central	61-58
NCAA	Division II	Baseball	2001	Central Missouri State	11–3
NCAA	Division II	Softball	2002	Grand Valley State (Mich.)	4-0

=== Individual (1) ===
Association	Division	Sport	Year	Individual(s)	Event
NCAA	Division II	Men's Golf	2006	Jamie Amoretti	Individual Title

== Facilities ==
Facility	Sport(s)	Capacity
Bill Greehey Arena	Basketball, Volleyball	3,800
Dickson Stadium	Baseball	2,260 (plus berm seating)
Sigma Beta Chi Field	Soccer	550 (plus portable seating)
Rohrbach Stadium Tennis Complex	Tennis	435 (plus portable seating)
Softball stadium	Softball	900 (plus berm seating)

== Mascot ==
The Rattler mascot has its own stories of how it came to be. Legend holds that the football practice field had to be cleared of diamondback rattlesnakes on a regular basis, thus leading to the designation. The truth is that Brother Kinsky thought “Rattlers” would be fitting because there was already on campus Rattler Club whose members had recently begun The Rattler newspaper. There was debate as to whether the name was being run into the ground, but the students quickly said they wanted the Rattler nickname.

Alton Seekatz (B.S.C. ’32), a member of the Rattler Club, described the organization as a spirit and social organization. “It was called the Rattler Club when I got here in 1926, and I’m not sure how it got its nickname,” he said, although his stories of the club members' antics and efforts to raise school spirit would certainly “rattle” some and “shake” up others.
