= Alamo Conference =

- Conference: NCAA
- Founded: 1935; 90 years ago
- Ceased: 1941; 84 years ago
- No. of teams: 4 (Football)
- Region: Southwest

Locations
- Schools of the Alamo Conference

The Alamo Conference was a short-lived intercollegiate athletic conference composed of member schools located in the state of Texas. The league was established in 1935 with St. Mary's, Sul Ross State, and Texas A&I as charter members. Competition began in 1936 continuing to 1941. Most of the conference's members eventually joined the Lone Star Conference.

== Member schools ==
=== Final members ===
Institution	Location (Note: All cities were located in the State of Texas.)	Founded	Affiliation	Enrollment	Nickname	Joined (Note: Represents the calendar year when fall sports competition begins.)	Left (Note: Represents the calendar year when spring sports competition ends.)	Colors	Current conference
St. Mary's University	San Antonio	1852	Catholic (Marianists)	3,253	Rattlers	1935	1942	Gold & Blue	Lone Star (LSC) (Note: Currently an NCAA Division II athletic conference.)
Texas College of Arts and Industries (Note: Currently known as Texas A&M University–Kingsville.)	Kingsville	1925	Public	6,092	Javelinas	1935	1942	Blue & Gold	Lone Star (LSC)
West Texas State Teachers College (Note: Currently known as West Texas A&M University.)	Canyon	1910	Public	9,241	Buffaloes	1939	1942	Maroon & White	Lone Star (LSC)

=== Other members ===
Institution	Location (Note: All cities were located in the State of Texas.)	Founded	Affiliation	Enrollment	Nickname	Joined (Note: Represents the calendar year when fall sports competition begins.)	Left (Note: Represents the calendar year when spring sports competition ends.)	Colors	Current conference
Sul Ross State Teachers College (Note: Currently known as Sul Ross State University.)	Alpine	1917	Public	1,987	Lobos	1935	1940	Scarlet & Grey	Lone Star (LSC) (Note: Currently an NCAA Division II athletic conference.)

=== Membership timeline ===
Alamo members

== Football championships ==
Alamo Conference football championships
Season	Champion	Conference record	Overall record
1936 (co-champions)	St. Mary's (TX)	1–1	7–3–2
1936 (co-champions)	Sul Ross	1–1	4–3–1
1936 (co-champions)	Texas A&I	1–1	6–4
1937 (co-champions)	St. Mary's (TX)	1–0–1	7–2–2
1937 (co-champions)	Texas A&I	1–0–1	4–3–1
1938	Texas A&I	2–0	6–3
1939 (co-champions)	Texas A&I	2–0–1	6–1–3
1939 (co-champions)	West Texas State	2–0–1	5–3–1
1940	West Texas State	2–0	7–3
1941	Texas A&I	1–0	8–2

== Yearly football standings ==
1936 Alamo Conference football standings
	Conf.					Overall
Team	W		L		T	W		L		T
St. Mary's (TX) +	1	–	1	–	0	7	–	3	–	2
Texas A&I +	1	–	1	–	0	6	–	4	–	0
Sul Ross +	1	–	1	–	0	4	–	3	–	1
+ – Conference co-champions

1939 Alamo Conference football standings
	Conf.					Overall
Team	W		L		T	W		L		T
Texas A&I +	2	–	0	–	1	6	–	1	–	3
West Texas State +	2	–	0	–	1	5	–	3	–	1
St. Mary's (TX)	1	–	2	–	0	5	–	4	–	2
Sul Ross	0	–	3	–	0	0	–	7	–	1
+ – Conference co-champions

1937 Alamo Conference football standings
	Conf.					Overall
Team	W		L		T	W		L		T
St. Mary's (TX) +	1	–	0	–	1	7	–	2	–	2
Texas A&I +	1	–	0	–	1	4	–	3	–	1
Sul Ross	0	–	2	–	0	2	–	4	–	0
+ – Conference co-champions

1940 Alamo Conference football standings
	Conf.					Overall
Team	W		L		T	W		L		T
West Texas State $	2	–	0	–	0	7	–	3	–	0
Texas A&I	1	–	1	–	0	6	–	3	–	0
St. Mary's (TX)	0	–	2	–	0	4	–	6	–	1
$ – Conference champion

1938 Alamo Conference football standings
	Conf.					Overall
Team	W		L		T	W		L		T
Texas A&I $	2	–	0	–	0	6	–	3	–	0
Sul Ross	1	–	1	–	0	4	–	3	–	1
St. Mary's (TX)	0	–	2	–	0	6	–	9	–	0
$ – Conference champion

1941 Alamo Conference football standings
	Conf.					Overall
Team	W		L		T	W		L		T
Texas A&I $	1	–	0	–	0	8	–	2	–	0
St. Mary's (TX)	0	–	1	–	0	7	–	4	–	1
$ – Conference champion
