= Kidd Field =

Athletics facility in El Paso, Texas

Coordinates: 31°46′28″N 106°30′21″W

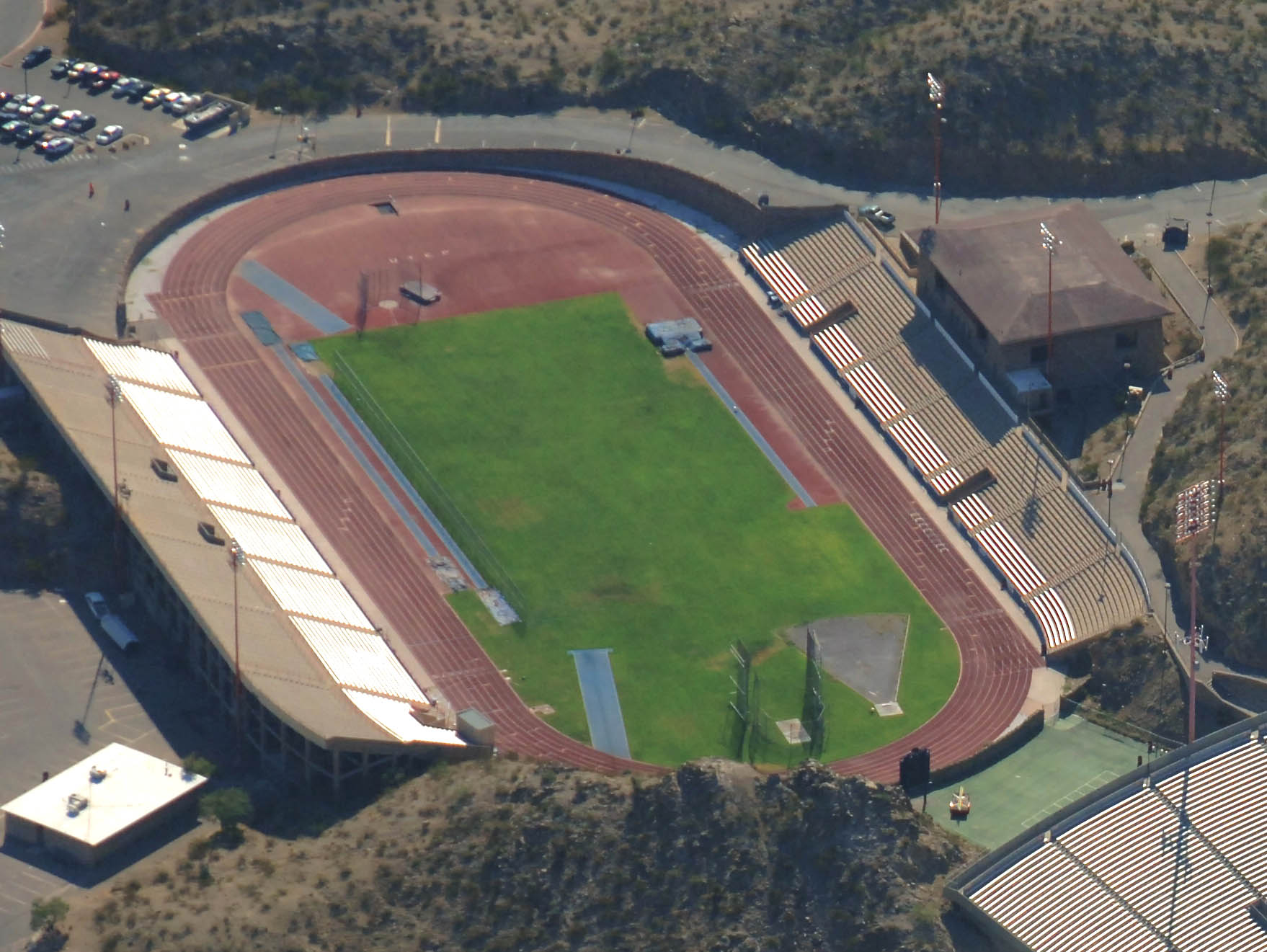
- Aerial view of the stadium in 2009
- Interactive map of Kidd Field
- Full name: Larry K. Durham Track at Kidd Field
- Address: El Paso, TX; United States
- Owner: University of Texas at El Paso
- Capacity: 15,000
- Type: Stadium
- Current use: Track and field

Construction
- Opened: 1938; 88 years ago

Tenants
- UTEP Miners (NCAA) teams: football (1938–1962); track and field (1962–present)

Website
- utepminers.com/kidd-field

Kidd Field (complete name, "Larry K. Durham Track at Kidd Field") is an athletic facility used primarily by the University of Texas at El Paso (UTEP) in El Paso, Texas. Constructed for its then-primary use as an American football field in 1938, it was the site of the Sun Bowl until 1963 when Sun Bowl Stadium opened. Kidd Field is used for track and field meets today. Built in the early 1930s for $2,000, Kidd Field has been home to numerous All-Americans, national champions, national record-holders and Olympians.

== Overview ==
Named after UTEP (then Texas College of Mines and Metallurgy) professor and athletic booster John W. Kidd, the facility was shared with the UTEP football team until 1962, when the facility became sole home to the track and field team. The track features an eight-lane Beynon track. The track was made possible by generous donations from Wayne and Russ Vandenburg of EPT Management and Mark Fry.

The track is named after former UTEP football player Larry K. Durham. His contribution gave Kidd Field a makeover in 2011, and it was dedicated in his name in April 2012. A state-of-the-art Daktronics video board was added in January 2008.
