= 1941 Millikin Big Blue football team =

American college football season

1941 Millikin Big Blue football
- 1941 Millikin players including Virgil Wagner (left), Jean Mason, Bill Murray, and Roger Merker (right)

ICC champion
- Conference: Illinois College Conference
- Record: 8–0 (6–0 ICC)
- Head coach: Marshall Wells (2nd season)
- Captain: Roger Merker
- Home stadium: J.M.U. Field

1941 Illinois College Conference football standings
	Conf.					Overall
Team	W		L		T	W		L		T
Millikin $	6	–	0	–	0	8	–	0	–	0
Bradley Tech *	1	–	0	–	0	8	–	1	–	0
North Central (IL)	3	–	1	–	1	5	–	1	–	1
Lake Forest	2	–	1	–	1	5	–	1	–	2
Monmouth (IL)	2	–	1	–	0	5	–	2	–	1
Knox (IL)	1	–	2	–	0	3	–	4	–	1
Augustana (IL)	1	–	4	–	0	2	–	6	–	0
Wheaton (IL)	0	–	2	–	1	3	–	5	–	2
Illinois Wesleyan	0	–	2	–	1	2	–	5	–	2
Illinois College	0	–	3	–	2	3	–	4	–	2
$ – Conference champion; * ineligible for league title

The 1941 Millikin Big Blue football team was an American football team that represented James Millikin University as a member of the Illinois College Conference (ICC) during the 1941 college football season. In their second year under head coach Marshall Wells, the Big Blue compiled a perfect 8–0 record (6–0 in conference games), won the ICC championship, shut out six of eight opponents, and outscored all opponents by a total of 257 to 9. They out-gained opponents by 2,400 yards to 140 yards. The 1941 campaign was one of only five undefeated seasons in Millikin football history, the others being 1919, 1920, 1942, and 1961.

Junior left halfback Virgil Wagner gained 1,081 yards on 170 carries (6.5 yards per carry), scored 12 touchdowns, and completed 27 of 54 passes. A triple-threat man, Wagner also handled punting duties, averaging 40.5 yards per punt. He also returned 23 punts for 292 yards (12.7-yard average) and averaged 28.3 yards on kickoff returns. Wagner received second-team honors on the Associated Press 1941 Little All-America college football team. Wagner later played for the Montreal Alouettes from 1946 to 1954 and was inducted into the Canadian Football Hall of Fame in 1980.

Roger Merker, a native of Belleville, Illinois, who played at end, served as team captain. Six Millikin players received spots on the United Press all-conference team: Merker at end; Buse and Murray at tackle; Wilson at guard; Wagner at quarterback; and Zachry at halfback.

The team played its five home games at James Millikin University Field (J.M.U. Field) in Decatur, Illinois.

== Schedule ==
Date	Opponent	Site	Result	Attendance	Source
September 27	at Cornell (IA)*	Mount Vernon, IA	W 21–0		
October 4	Monmouth (IL)	J.M.U. Field; Decatur, IL	W 13–0		
October 11	Illinois College	J.M.U. Field; Decatur, IL	W 33–0		
October 18	Knox (IL)	J.M.U. Field; Decatur, IL	W 45–6		
October 25	Illinois Wesleyan^{†}	J.M.U. Field; Decatur, IL	W 27–0		
November 1	at Eastern Illinois*	Charleston, IL	W 61–0		
November 8	at North Central (IL)	Naperville, IL	W 6–0		
November 16	Lake Forest	J.M.U. Field; Decatur, IL	W 51–3	3,000	
*Non-conference game; ^{†}Homecoming
