= 1942 Millikin Big Blue football team =

American college football season

1942 Millikin Big Blue football
- 1942 Millikin football team

ICC champion
- Conference: Illinois College Conference
- Record: 7–0 (5–0 ICC)
- Head coach: Fuzzy Sutherd (1st season)
- Captain: Virgil Wagner
- Home stadium: J.M.U. Field

1942 Illinois College Conference football standings
	Conf.					Overall
Team	W		L		T	W		L		T
Millikin $	5	–	0	–	0	7	–	0	–	0
Augustana (IL)	4	–	1	–	0	7	–	1	–	0
Knox (IL)	2	–	1	–	0	6	–	2	–	0
Illinois Wesleyan	2	–	1	–	0	4	–	5	–	0
North Central (IL)	1	–	1	–	0	5	–	2	–	0
Bradley	0	–	1	–	0	4	–	4	–	0
Illinois College	0	–	3	–	0	3	–	4	–	1
Lake Forest	0	–	3	–	0	2	–	4	–	1
Monmouth (IL)	0	–	3	–	0	2	–	6	–	0
$ – Conference champion

The 1942 Millikin Big Blue football team was an American football team that represented James Millikin University as a member of the Illinois College Conference (ICC) during the 1942 college football season. In their first and only year under head coach Fuzzy Sutherd, the Big Blue compiled a perfect 7–0 record (5–0 in conference games), won the ICC championship, and outscored opponents by a total of 174 to 37. Having gone undefeated in 1941 as well, Millikin extended its winning streak to 16 games (dating to the final game of the 1940 season). The 1942 campaign was one of only five undefeated seasons in Millikin football history, the others being 1919, 1920, 1941, and 1961.

Sutherd was Millikin's athletic director prior to the 1942 season. He added coaching to his duties when head football coach Marshall Wells and assistant coach Don Lindeberg both entered the military following the country's entry into World War II.

Senior halfback Virgil Wagner was the team captain. He was also selected as a first-team player on the Associated Press 1942 Little All-America college football team. Wagner later played for the Montreal Alouettes from 1946 to 1954 and was inducted into the Canadian Football Hall of Fame in 1980.

Four Millikin players received first-team honors on the all-conference team: Wagner; Ed Dahm at halfback; Perry MacIntosh at guard; and Bill Travis at tackle. Two others, Glenn Lauher at guard and Jack Miller at end, were named to the second team.

The team played its home games at Decatur High School field (two games) and James Millikin University Field (one game) in Decatur, Illinois.

== Schedule ==
Date	Opponent	Site	Result	Attendance	Source
September 25	Carroll (WI)*	Decatur High School field; Decatur, IL	W 7–0		
October 3	at Monmouth (IL)	Monmouth, IL	W 14–6		
October 17	Knox (IL)^{†}	J.M.U. Field; Decatur, IL	W 28–6		
October 24	at Illinois Wesleyan	Bloomington, IL	W 49–12		
October 31	Eastern Illinois*	Decatur High School Field; Decatur, IL	W 56–6	1,000	
November 14	at Lake Forest	Lake Forest, IL	W 13–7	1,500	
November 21	at Illinois College	Jacksonville, IL	W 7–0		
*Non-conference game; ^{†}Homecoming

== Starters ==
The following players started every game for the 1942 Millikin team:

- Jerry Brewer, fullback
- Ed Dahm, right halfback
- Glenn Lauher, right guard
- Perry McIntosh, left guard
- Jack Miller, right end (1921–1999)
- Frank Poneta, center
- Len Scott, right tackle
- Bill Travis, left tackle
- Bob Vaughn, left end
- Virgil Wagner, left halfback and captain
- Don Wilt, quarterback
