= Bob Reade =

American football player and coach (1932–2020)

Biographical details
- Born: July 22, 1932; Monticello, Iowa, U.S.
- Died: July 5, 2020 (aged 87); Geneseo, Illinois, U.S.

Playing career
- 1950s: Cornell (IA)
- Position: Linebacker

Coaching career (HC unless noted)
- 1962–1978: Darnall HS (IL)
- 1979–1994: Augustana (IL)

Head coaching record
- Overall: 146–23–1 (college); 146–21–4 (high school)
- Tournaments: 19–7 (NCAA D-III playoffs)

Accomplishments and honors

Championships
- 4 NCAA Division III (1983–1986); 12 CCIW (1981–1988, 1990–1991, 1993–1994)

Awards
- 4× AFCA Division III Coach of the Year (1983–1986); Amos Alonzo Stagg Award (1998); 9× CCIW Coach of the Year (1981, 1983–1987, 1990, 1993–1994)
- College Football Hall of Fame; Inducted in 1998 (profile)

Bob Reade (July 22, 1932 – July 5, 2020) was an American football coach. He served as the head coach at Augustana College in Rock Island, Illinois from 1979 to 1994, compiling a record of 146–23–1. His Augustana Vikings won four consecutive NCAA Division III Football Championships from 1983 and 1986 and were runners-up in 1982. Reade's teams went unbeaten for 60 straight games (59 wins, one tie) between the start of the 1983 season and the second round of the 1987 NCAA Division III playoffs, when Augustana lost to Dayton, 38–36. This remains the record for the longest unbeaten streak in NCAA Division III football history. Reade's teams won or shared 12 College Conference of Illinois and Wisconsin championships and he was named conference Coach of the Year nine times (1981, 1983–1987, 1990, 1993–1994). This award is now named in his honor. Reade was inducted into the College Football Hall of Fame as a coach in 1998.

== Playing career ==
Reade played football as a linebacker at Cornell College in Mount Vernon, Iowa, from which he graduated in 1954.

== Coaching career ==
Reade was the head football coach at J. D. Darnall High School in Geneseo, Illinois from 1962 to 1978, compiling a record of 146–21–4. Reade won three consecutive Illinois 3A state championships in 1976, 1977, and 1978. In 1979, Reade was hired at Augustana College, an NCAA Division III school in Rock Island, Illinois. He retired in 1994 with 146 wins and 11 playoff appearances at Augustana, in addition to 12 conference titles and 4 national championships.

== Honors ==
Reade was a recipient of the Amos Alonzo Stagg Award and was inducted into the College Football Hall of Fame in 1998. Additionally, he was inducted into the Tribe of Vikings HOF, the Geneseo High School HOF, the Quad City Times HOF, and the Illinois Football Coaches Association HOF. In 1993, Reade authored a booked titled Coaching Football Successfully (ISBN 087322518X), for which Penn State's Joe Paterno wrote the foreword.

== Death ==
Reade died on July 5, 2020. He was buried at Oakwood Cemetery in Geneseo, Illinois.

== Head coaching record ==
=== College ===
Year	Team	Overall	Conference	Standing	Bowl/playoffs
Augustana (Illinois) Vikings (College Conference of Illinois and Wisconsin) (1979–1994)
1979	Augustana	6–3	5–3	T–4th	
1980	Augustana	6–3	5–3	T–3rd	
1981	Augustana	9–1	8–0	1st	L NCAA Division III First Round
1982	Augustana	11–1	8–0	1st	L NCAA Division III Championship
1983	Augustana	12–0	8–0	1st	W NCAA Division III Championship
1984	Augustana	12–0	8–0	1st	W NCAA Division III Championship
1985	Augustana	13–0	8–0	1st	W NCAA Division III Championship
1986	Augustana	12–0–1	7–0–1	1st	W NCAA Division III Championship
1987	Augustana	10–1	8–0	1st	L NCAA Division III Quarterfinal
1988	Augustana	10–2	7–1	T–1st	L NCAA Division III Semifinal
1989	Augustana	8–2	7–1	2nd	L NCAA Division III First Round
1990	Augustana	8–2	7–1	T–1st	L NCAA Division III First Round
1991	Augustana	8–1	7–1	1st	
1992	Augustana	6–3	6–1	2nd	
1993	Augustana	7–2	7–0	1st	
1994	Augustana	8–2	6–1	T–1st	L NCAA Division III First Round
Augustana:		146–23–1	112–12–1		
Total:		146–23–1			
National championship Conference title Conference division title or championship game berth

== See also ==
- List of college football career coaching winning percentage leaders
