= 1941 Bradley Tech Braves football team =

American college football season

1941 Bradley Tech Braves football
- Conference: Illinois College Conference
- Record: 8–1 (1–0 ICC)
- Head coach: Alfred J. Robertson (21st season)
- Captain: Harold Klesath
- Home stadium: Peoria Stadium

1941 Illinois College Conference football standings
	Conf.					Overall
Team	W		L		T	W		L		T
Millikin $	6	–	0	–	0	8	–	0	–	0
Bradley Tech *	1	–	0	–	0	8	–	1	–	0
North Central (IL)	3	–	1	–	1	5	–	1	–	1
Lake Forest	2	–	1	–	1	5	–	1	–	2
Monmouth (IL)	2	–	1	–	0	5	–	2	–	1
Knox (IL)	1	–	2	–	0	3	–	4	–	1
Augustana (IL)	1	–	4	–	0	2	–	6	–	0
Wheaton (IL)	0	–	2	–	1	3	–	5	–	2
Illinois Wesleyan	0	–	2	–	1	2	–	5	–	2
Illinois College	0	–	3	–	2	3	–	4	–	2
$ – Conference champion; * ineligible for league title

The 1941 Bradley Tech Braves football team was an American football team that represented Bradley Polytechnic Institute (now known as Bradley University) as a member of the Illinois College Conference during the 1941 college football season. In their 21st season under head coach Alfred J. Robertson, the Braves compiled an 8–1 record (1–0 against ICC opponents), shut out five of nine opponents, and outscored all opponents by a total of 209 to 33. Having played only one game against an ICC opponent, Bradely was ineligible for the conference championship.

Key players included Russ Ormsbee and Ray Ramsey. Prior to the season, three Bradley players (Johnny Sheridan, Larry Sovansky and Bill Whiteside) were drafted into the armed services.

Bradley was ranked at No. 97 (out of 681 teams) in the final rankings under the Litkenhous Difference by Score System for 1941.

== Schedule ==
Date	Opponent	Site	Result	Attendance	Source
September 27	Carleton*	Northfield, MN	W 19–6		
October 11	Ripon*	Peoria, IL	W 27–6		
October 18	Louisiana College*	Peoria, IL	W 33–0		
October 25	New Mexico A&M*	Peoria, IL	W 26–0	5,000	
October 27	Arkansas A&M*	Peoria, IL	W 67–0	3,000	
November 1	at North Dakota*	Memorial Stadium; Grand Forks, ND	W 19–7		
November 8	at Illinois Wesleyan	Bloomington, IL	W 6–0	500	
November 15	Jefferson Barracks*	Peoria, IL	W 6–0		
November 22	Toledo*	Peoria, IL	L 6–14		
*Non-conference game
