= John Briley (coach) =

American football player and coach (1907–1998)

Biographical details
- Born: June 26, 1907; Lone Rock, Iowa, U.S.
- Died: November 19, 1998 (aged 91); Marietta, Ohio, U.S.

Playing career

Football
- 1929–1931: Drake

Coaching career (HC unless noted)

Football
- 1941–1942: Augustana (IL)
- 1946: Augustana (IL)

Basketball
- 1941–1943: Augustana (IL)
- 1945–1947: Augustana (IL)

Baseball
- 1947: Augustana (IL)

Head coaching record
- Overall: 12–12 (football); 35–44 (basketball); 6–5(baseball)

John L. Briley (June 26, 1907 – November 19, 1998) was an American college football player and coach. He served as the head football coach and head basketball coach at Augustana College in Rock Island, Illinois. Briley was a three-time lettermen at Drake University in Des Moines, Iowa.

== Head coaching record ==
=== Football ===
Year	Team	Overall	Conference	Standing	Bowl/playoffs
Augustana (Illinois) Vikings (Illinois College Conference) (1941–1942)
1941	Augustana	2–6	1–4	7th	
1942	Augustana	7–1	4–1	2nd	
Augustana (Illinois) Vikings (College Conference of Illinois) (1946)
1946	Augustana	3–5	2–2	5th	
Augustana:		12–12	7–7		
Total:		12–12			
