= 1983 NCAA Division III football season =

American college football season

- Regular season: August – November 1983
- Playoffs: November – December 1983
- National championship: Galbreath Field; Kings Island, Mason, Ohio
- Champion: Augustana (IL)

The 1983 NCAA Division III football season, part of college football in the United States organized by the National Collegiate Athletic Association at the Division III level, began in August 1983, and concluded with the NCAA Division III Football Championship, also known as the Stagg Bowl, in December 1983 at Galbreath Field in Kings Island, Mason, Ohio. The Augustana (IL) Vikings won their first of four consecutive Division III championships by defeating the Union Dutchmen by a final score of 21−17.

== Conference and program changes ==
- The Centennial Conference began football play in 1983. 8 schools left the Middle Atlantic Conference to join the new conference. Two schools from the MAC also became independents.
- Fisk reclassified from Division II for this season only, their final one.
- St. Norbert provisionally joined the Midwest Conference this year, becoming full members in 1984.

School	1982 conference	1983 conference
Carleton	Midwest	MIAC
Dickinson	MAC	Centennial
Fairleigh Dickinson- Florham	MAC	Independent
Fisk	SIAC	CAC
Franklin & Marshall	MAC	Centennial
Gettysburg	MAC	Centennial
Illinois College	CAC	Midwest
Johns Hopkins	MAC	Centennial
Kentucky Wesleyan	Revived Program	Independent
Lebanon Valley	MAC	Independent
Muhlenberg	MAC	Centennial
St. Norbert	Independent	Midwest
Swarthmore	MAC	Centennial
Ursinus	MAC	Centennial
Western Maryland	MAC	Centennial

== Conference standings ==
1983 Centennial Conference football standings
	Conf.					Overall
Team	W		L		T	W		L		T
Gettysburg +	5	–	2	–	0	8	–	2	–	0
Swarthmore +	5	–	2	–	0	7	–	2	–	0
Muhlenberg +	5	–	2	–	0	6	–	3	–	0
Franklin & Marshall	4	–	3	–	0	5	–	4	–	0
Johns Hopkins	3	–	4	–	0	5	–	4	–	0
Western Maryland	3	–	4	–	0	4	–	4	–	1
Ursinus	2	–	5	–	0	4	–	5	–	0
Dickinson	1	–	6	–	0	2	–	7	–	0
+ – Conference co-champions

1983 College Athletic Conference football standings
	Conf.					Overall
Team	W		L		T	W		L		T
Centre +	4	–	1	–	0	5	–	3	–	1
Rose–Hulman +	4	–	1	–	0	6	–	5	–	0
Sewanee	3	–	2	–	0	5	–	4	–	0
Southwestern (TN)	3	–	2	–	0	4	–	6	–	0
Principia	1	–	4	–	0	3	–	5	–	1
Fisk	0	–	5	–	0	0	–	8	–	0
+ – Conference co-champions

1983 College Conference of Illinois and Wisconsin football standings
	Conf.					Overall
Team	W		L		T	W		L		T
Augustana (IL) $^	8	–	0	–	0	12	–	0	–	0
Elmhurst	6	–	2	–	0	7	–	2	–	0
Wheaton (IL)	5	–	3	–	0	6	–	3	–	0
Illinois Wesleyan	5	–	3	–	0	5	–	4	–	0
Millikin	4	–	4	–	0	4	–	5	–	0
Carthage	3	–	5	–	0	4	–	5	–	0
North Central (IL)	3	–	5	–	0	4	–	5	–	0
North Park	2	–	6	–	0	3	–	6	–	0
Carroll (WI)	0	–	8	–	0	0	–	8	–	0
$ – Conference champion; ^ – NCAA Division III playoff participant

1983 Independent College Athletic Conference football standings
	Conf.					Overall
Team	W		L		T	W		L		T
St. Lawrence $	3	–	0	–	1	5	–	3	–	1
Hobart	2	–	1	–	1	5	–	3	–	1
Ithaca	1	–	2	–	0	7	–	3	–	0
RPI	0	–	1	–	1	2	–	6	–	1
Alfred	0	–	2	–	1	4	–	5	–	1
$ – Conference champion

1983 Iowa Conference football standings
	Conf.					Overall
Team	W		L		T	W		L		T
Wartburg +	6	–	1	–	0	8	–	1	–	0
Central (IA) +	6	–	1	–	0	7	–	2	–	0
Buena Vista	5	–	2	–	0	6	–	4	–	0
Luther	3	–	4	–	0	5	–	4	–	0
Dubuque	3	–	4	–	0	4	–	6	–	0
Simpson (IA)	2	–	5	–	0	3	–	6	–	0
William Penn	2	–	5	–	0	2	–	8	–	0
Upper Iowa	1	–	6	–	0	2	–	8	–	0
+ – Conference co-champions

1983 Metropolitan Intercollegiate Conference football standings
	Conf.					Overall
Team	W		L		T	W		L		T
St. John's $	4	–	0	–	0	9	–	1	–	0
Marist	3	–	1	–	0	3	–	6	–	0
Pace	2	–	2	–	0	5	–	4	–	0
Saint Peter's	1	–	3	–	0	1	–	7	–	0
Brooklyn	0	–	4	–	0	0	–	9	–	0
$ – Conference champion

1983 Michigan Intercollegiate Athletic Association football standings
	Conf.					Overall
Team	W		L		T	W		L		T
Adrian $^	5	–	0	–	0	8	–	2	–	0
Hope	3	–	2	–	0	6	–	3	–	0
Alma	3	–	2	–	0	4	–	5	–	0
Albion	2	–	3	–	0	5	–	4	–	0
Kalamazoo	2	–	3	–	0	5	–	4	–	0
Olivet	0	–	5	–	0	3	–	6	–	0
$ – Conference champion; ^ – NCAA Division III playoff participant

1983 Middle Atlantic Conference football standings
	Conf.					Overall
Team	W		L		T	W		L		T
Susquehanna $	7	–	0	–	1	8	–	0	–	1
Lycoming	6	–	1	–	1	7	–	2	–	1
Widener	6	–	2	–	0	7	–	3	–	0
Moravian	5	–	3	–	0	6	–	3	–	0
Delaware Valley	4	–	4	–	0	6	–	4	–	0
Albright	4	–	4	–	0	5	–	4	–	0
Wilkes	1	–	7	–	0	2	–	7	–	0
Juniata	1	–	7	–	0	2	–	8	–	0
Upsala	1	–	7	–	0	2	–	9	–	0
$ – Conference champion

1983 Midwest Conference football standings
	Conf.					Overall
Team	W		L		T	W		L		T
North Division
Lake Forest xy$	4	–	0	–	0	7	–	2	–	0
Lawrence	3	–	1	–	0	7	–	2	–	0
Ripon	2	–	2	–	0	4	–	5	–	0
Beloit	1	–	3	–	0	2	–	7	–	0
Chicago	0	–	4	–	0	2	–	7	–	0
St. Norbert			–			3	–	7	–	0
South Division
Cornell (IA) xy	5	–	0	–	0	5	–	5	–	0
Coe	4	–	1	–	0	6	–	2	–	1
Illinois College	2	–	3	–	0	3	–	6	–	0
Knox	1	–	3	–	1	3	–	4	–	1
Monmouth (IL)	1	–	3	–	1	2	–	6	–	1
Grinnell	1	–	4	–	0	2	–	7	–	0
Championship: Lake Forest 13, Cornell 10
$ – Conference champion; x – Division champion/co-champions; y – Championship game participant

1983 Minnesota Intercollegiate Athletic Conference football standings
	Conf.					Overall
Team	W		L		T	W		L		T
No. 4 St. Thomas (MN) $^	9	–	0	–	0	9	–	2	–	0
Saint John's (MN)	7	–	2	–	0	7	–	4	–	0
Hamline	6	–	3	–	0	6	–	4	–	0
Gustavus Adolphus	5	–	4	–	0	6	–	4	–	0
Macalester	5	–	4	–	0	6	–	4	–	0
Concordia–Moorhead	4	–	5	–	0	5	–	6	–	0
Augsburg	3	–	6	–	0	4	–	7	–	0
St. Olaf	3	–	6	–	0	3	–	7	–	0
Bethel (MN)	2	–	7	–	0	2	–	8	–	0
Carleton	1	–	8	–	0	2	–	8	–	0
$ – Conference champion; ^ – NAIA Division II playoff participant; Rankings from NAIA Division II poll

1983 New England Football Conference standings
	Conf.					Overall
Team	W		L		T	W		L		T
Plymouth State +	8	–	1	–	0	9	–	2	–	0
Massachusetts Maritime +	8	–	1	–	0	8	–	2	–	0
Nichols	7	–	2	–	0	7	–	2	–	0
Western Connecticut State	6	–	3	–	0	7	–	3	–	0
Bridgewater State	4	–	5	–	0	4	–	5	–	0
Western New England	4	–	5	–	0	4	–	5	–	0
Framingham State	3	–	6	–	0	3	–	6	–	0
Maine Maritime	3	–	6	–	0	3	–	6	–	0
Westfield State	2	–	7	–	0	2	–	7	–	0
Curry	0	–	9	–	0	0	–	9	–	0
+ – Conference co-champions

1983 New England Small College Athletic Conference football standings
	Conf.					Overall
Team	W		L		T	W		L		T
Trinity (CT)	5	–	1	–	0	6	–	2	–	0
Amherst	5	–	2	–	1	5	–	2	–	1
Middlebury	4	–	2	–	0	6	–	2	–	0
Wesleyan	4	–	3	–	0	4	–	4	–	0
Tufts	4	–	3	–	1	4	–	3	–	1
Colby	3	–	3	–	0	3	–	5	–	0
Williams	2	–	3	–	1	2	–	5	–	1
Hamilton	2	–	4	–	0	2	–	6	–	0
Bates	1	–	5	–	1	1	–	6	–	1
Bowdoin	1	–	6	–	0	1	–	7	–	0
The NESCAC did not recognize an official conference champion until 2000

1983 New Jersey State Athletic Conference football standings
	Conf.					Overall
Team	W		L		T	W		L		T
Trenton State +	5	–	1	–	0	8	–	2	–	0
Montclair State +	5	–	1	–	0	7	–	2	–	1
Glassboro State +	5	–	1	–	0	5	–	5	–	0
Ramapo	2	–	4	–	0	5	–	4	–	0
Kean	2	–	4	–	0	4	–	5	–	1
William Paterson	2	–	4	–	0	3	–	7	–	0
Jersey City State	0	–	6	–	0	3	–	6	–	0
$ – Conference champion

1983 Northern Intercollegiate Conference football standings
	Conf.					Overall
Team	W		L		T	W		L		T
No. 20 Winona State $	5	–	1	–	0	7	–	4	–	0
Moorhead State	4	–	2	–	0	6	–	3	–	0
Minnesota Duluth	4	–	2	–	0	6	–	4	–	0
Minnesota Morris	2	–	3	–	1	4	–	4	–	2
Northern State	1	–	3	–	2	4	–	4	–	2
Southwest State (MN)	1	–	3	–	2	3	–	6	–	2
Bemidji State	1	–	4	–	1	4	–	6	–	1
$ – Conference champion; Rankings from NAIA Division I poll

1983 Ohio Athletic Conference football standings
	Conf.					Overall
Team	W		L		T	W		L		T
Blue Division
Baldwin–Wallace xy$	5	–	0	–	0	6	–	4	–	0
Muskingum	4	–	1	–	0	6	–	3	–	0
Mount Union	2	–	3	–	0	6	–	3	–	0
Capital	2	–	3	–	0	4	–	5	–	0
Wooster	2	–	3	–	0	3	–	6	–	0
Heidelberg	0	–	5	–	0	2	–	7	–	0
Red Division
Wittenberg xy	5	–	0	–	0	8	–	2	–	0
Denison	3	–	1	–	1	6	–	2	–	1
Ohio Northern	3	–	2	–	0	5	–	4	–	0
Otterbein	2	–	3	–	0	3	–	6	–	0
Ohio Wesleyan	1	–	3	–	1	1	–	6	–	2
Marietta	0	–	5	–	0	0	–	9	–	0
Not competing for championship
Kenyon			–			5	–	3	–	1
Oberlin			–			2	–	7	–	0
Championship: Baldwin–Wallace 17, Wittenberg 14
$ – Conference champion; x – Division champion/co-champions; y – Championship game participant

1983 Old Dominion Athletic Conference football standings
	Conf.					Overall
Team	W		L		T	W		L		T
Hampden–Sydney $	5	–	1	–	0	6	–	4	–	0
Washington and Lee	4	–	2	–	0	6	–	3	–	0
Emory & Henry	4	–	2	–	0	5	–	5	–	0
Randolph–Macon	4	–	2	–	0	5	–	5	–	0
Catholic University	3	–	3	–	0	5	–	5	–	0
Maryville (TN)	1	–	5	–	0	2	–	6	–	0
Bridgewater	0	–	6	–	0	0	–	9	–	0
$ – Conference champion

1983 Presidents' Athletic Conference football standings
	Conf.					Overall
Team	W		L		T	W		L		T
Carnegie Mellon $^	7	–	0	–	0	9	–	1	–	0
Case Western Reserve	6	–	1	–	0	8	–	1	–	0
John Carroll	4	–	3	–	0	4	–	5	–	0
Washington & Jefferson	3	–	3	–	1	3	–	5	–	1
Bethany (WV)	3	–	4	–	0	4	–	5	–	0
Hiram	2	–	4	–	1	3	–	5	–	1
Allegheny	2	–	5	–	0	4	–	5	–	0
Thiel	0	–	7	–	0	0	–	9	–	0
$ – Conference champion; ^ – NCAA Division III playoff participant

1983 Southern California Intercollegiate Athletic Conference football standings
	Conf.					Overall
Team	W		L		T	W		L		T
Occidental $^	5	–	0	–	0	8	–	2	–	0
Whittier	4	–	1	–	0	7	–	2	–	0
Redlands	2	–	3	–	0	4	–	6	–	0
La Verne	2	–	3	–	0	3	–	5	–	0
Claremont-Mudd	2	–	3	–	0	3	–	6	–	0
Pomona-Pitzer	0	–	5	–	0	0	–	8	–	0
$ – Conference champion; ^ – NCAA Division III playoff participant

1983 Southern Intercollegiate Athletic Conference football standings
	Conf.					Overall
Team	W		L		T	W		L		T
Division II
No. 9 Fort Valley State x	8	–	0	–	0	9	–	1	–	0
Alabama A&M	6	–	1	–	0	7	–	3	–	1
Tuskegee	5	–	3	–	0	5	–	6	–	0
Morris Brown	4	–	3	–	0	5	–	4	–	1
Morehouse	4	–	4	–	0	6	–	4	–	0
Albany State	3	–	5	–	0	4	–	6	–	0
Savannah State	1	–	6	–	0	2	–	9	–	0
Clark	0	–	7	–	0	2	–	7	–	0
Division III
Knoxville x	3	–	0	–	0	5	–	2	–	1
Lane	1	–	1	–	0	6	–	4	–	0
Miles	0	–	5	–	0	2	–	8	–	0
x – Division champion/co-champions; Rankings from 1983 NCAA Division II football rankings

1983 Wisconsin State University Conference football standings
	Conf.					Overall
Team	W		L		T	W		L		T
No. 11 Wisconsin–Eau Claire $	7	–	1	–	0	8	–	2	–	0
Wisconsin–La Crosse ^	6	–	1	–	1	9	–	3	–	1
Wisconsin–River Falls	6	–	2	–	0	8	–	2	–	0
Wisconsin–Whitewater	6	–	2	–	0	6	–	5	–	0
Wisconsin–Oshkosh	3	–	4	–	1	5	–	4	–	1
Wisconsin–Platteville	3	–	5	–	0	4	–	6	–	0
Wisconsin–Stevens Point	2	–	6	–	0	4	–	6	–	0
Wisconsin–Stout	2	–	6	–	0	2	–	9	–	0
Wisconsin–Superior	0	–	8	–	0	1	–	10	–	0
$ – Conference champion; ^ – NCAA Division III playoff participant; Rankings from NAIA Division I poll

1983 NCAA Division III independents football records
	Conf.			Overall
Team	W	L	T	W		L		T
WPI		–		8	–	0	–	0
Hofstra ^		–		10	–	1	–	0
Salisbury State ^		–		10	–	1	–	1
Union (NY) ^		–		10	–	2	–	0
Buffalo		–		8	–	2	–	0
Millsaps		–		7	–	2	–	0
Wagner		–		8	–	2	–	1
Dayton		–		7	–	3	–	0
DePauw		–		7	–	3	–	0
Bishop		–		7	–	4	–	0
Mercyhurst		–		5	–	3	–	1
Buffalo State		–		5	–	4	–	0
Canisius		–		5	–	4	–	0
Wabash		–		5	–	4	–	0
Duquesne		–		5	–	4	–	1
Trinity (TX)		–		4	–	3	–	0
Norwich		–		5	–	5	–	0
San Diego		–		5	–	5	–	0
Cortland		–		4	–	5	–	0
Rochester (NY)		–		4	–	5	–	0
Merchant Marine		–		4	–	5	–	0
Lowell		–		4	–	5	–	0
Kentucky Wesleyan		–		3	–	5	–	0
Grove City		–		3	–	6	–	0
Iona		–		3	–	6	–	0
Albany		–		3	–	7	–	0
Georgetown		–		2	–	6	–	0
Lebanon Valley		–		2	–	7	–	1
Colorado College		–		2	–	7	–	0
Washington (MO)		–		2	–	7	–	0
Frostburg State		–		2	–	8	–	0
Fordham		–		2	–	9	–	0
Saint Francis (PA)		–		1	–	7	–	0
Fairleigh Dickinson–Florham		–		1	–	8	–	0
Brockport		–		0	–	10	–	0
^ – NCAA Division III playoff participant

== Conference champions ==
Conference champions
- Centennial Conference – Gettysburg, Muhlenberg, and Swarthmore
- College Athletic Conference – Centre and Rose–Hulman
- College Conference of Illinois and Wisconsin – Augustana (IL)
- Independent College Athletic Conference – St. Lawrence
- Iowa Intercollegiate Athletic Conference – Central (IA) and Wartburg
- Michigan Intercollegiate Athletic Association – Adrian
- Middle Atlantic Conference – Susquehanna
- Midwest Collegiate Athletic Conference – Lake Forest
- Minnesota Intercollegiate Athletic Conference – St. Thomas (MN)
- New England Football Conference – Massachusetts Maritime and Plymouth State
- New Jersey State Athletic Conference – Glassboro State, Montclair State, and Trenton State
- Northwest Conference – Pacific Lutheran
- Ohio Athletic Conference – Baldwin Wallace (Red Division), Wittenberg (Blue Division)
- Old Dominion Athletic Conference – Hampden–Sydney
- Presidents' Athletic Conference – Carnegie Mellon
- Southern California Intercollegiate Athletic Conference – Occidental
- Texas Intercollegiate Athletic Association – McMurry and Sul Ross
- Upper Midwest Athletic Conference – Mount Senario and Northwestern (WI)
- Wisconsin Intercollegiate Athletic Conference – Wisconsin–Eau Claire

== Postseason ==
The 1983 NCAA Division III Football Championship playoffs were the 11th annual single-elimination tournament to determine the national champion of men's NCAA Division III college football. The championship Stagg Bowl game was held at Galbreath Field at the College Football Hall of Fame in Kings Island, Mason, Ohio for the first time. Like the previous eight championships, eight teams competed in this edition.

=== Playoff bracket ===
Quarterfinals; Campus Sites
Union (NY)	51
Hofstra	19
Salisbury State	16
Carnegie Mellon	14
Augustana (IL)	22
Adrian	21
Wisconsin–La Crosse	43
Occidental	42

Semifinals; Campus Sites
Union (NY)	23
Salisbury State	21
Augustana (IL)	21
Wisconsin–La Crosse	15

National Championship Game; Galbreath Field; Kings Island, Mason, OH
Union (NY)	17
Augustana (IL)	21

== See also ==
- 1983 NCAA Division I-A football season
- 1983 NCAA Division I-AA football season
- 1983 NCAA Division II football season
