= 1938 Bradley Tech Braves football team =

American college football season

1938 Bradley Tech Braves football

ICC co-champion
- Conference: Illinois College Conference
- Record: 7–0–1 (4–0 ICC)
- Head coach: Alfred J. Robertson (18th season)
- Home stadium: Peoria Stadium

1938 Illinois College Conference football standings
	Conf.					Overall
Team	W		L		T	W		L		T
Bradley Tech +	4	–	0	–	0	7	–	0	–	1
Lake Forest +	4	–	0	–	0	5	–	2	–	0
Illinois College	2	–	1	–	0	4	–	4	–	0
Wheaton (IL)	2	–	1	–	0	3	–	3	–	0
Illinois Wesleyan	2	–	1	–	0	3	–	4	–	1
Knox (IL)	1	–	2	–	1	3	–	4	–	1
Monmouth (IL)	1	–	2	–	0	5	–	5	–	0
North Central	1	–	3	–	0	3	–	4	–	0
Augustana (IL)	1	–	3	–	0	3	–	4	–	1
Millikin	0	–	5	–	1	2	–	5	–	1
+ – Conference co-champions

The 1938 Bradley Tech Braves football team was an American football team that represented Bradley Polytechnic Institute (now known as Bradley University) as a member of the Illinois College Conference during the 1938 college football season. In their 18th season under head coach Alfred J. Robertson, the Braves compiled a 7–0–1 record (4–0 against ICC opponents), tied with Lake Forest for the ICC championship, shut out five of eight opponents, and outscored all opponents by a total of 173 to 19.

Halfback Ted Panish was selected by the Associated Press as a first-team player on the 1938 Little All-America college football team. Four Bradley Tech players (Panish, end Virgil Van Cleave, guard Charley Gross, and back Jim Molnar) received first-team honors on the Illinois College Conference all-star team selected by the coaches for the Associated Press. Three others received second-team honors.

== Schedule ==
Date	Opponent	Site	Result	Attendance	Source
September 23	at Saint Louis*	Walsh Stadium; St. Louis, MO	W 6–0	6,224	
October 1	at Chicago*	Stagg Field; Chicago, IL	T 0–0	14,000	
October 15	Carleton*	Peoria Stadium; Peoria, IL	W 26–6		
October 22	Omaha*	Benson Field; Omaha, NE	W 21–0	2,000	
October 29	Illinois Wesleyan	Peoria Stadium; Peoria, IL	W 13–0		
November 5	Augustana (IL)	Peoria Stadium; Peoria, IL	W 34–7		
November 12	at Knox	Galesburg, IL	W 31–6		
November 19	at Millikin	J.M.U. Field; Decatur, IL	W 42–0		
*Non-conference game
