= 1984 Augustana (Illinois) Vikings football team =

American college football season

1984 Augustana (Illinois) Vikings football

NCAA Division III champion CCIW champion

Stagg Bowl, W 21–12 vs. Central (IA)
- Conference: College Conference of Illinois and Wisconsin
- Record: 12–0 (8–0 CCIW)
- Head coach: Bob Reade (6th season)
- Home stadium: Ericson Field

1984 College Conference of Illinois and Wisconsin football standings
	Conf.					Overall
Team	W		L		T	W		L		T
Augustana (IL) $^	8	–	0	–	0	12	–	0	–	0
Millikin	7	–	1	–	0	7	–	2	–	0
Elmhurst	5	–	3	–	0	6	–	3	–	0
Wheaton (IL)	5	–	3	–	0	6	–	3	–	0
Illinois Wesleyan	5	–	3	–	0	5	–	4	–	0
Carroll (WI)	2	–	6	–	0	3	–	6	–	0
Carthage	2	–	6	–	0	2	–	7	–	0
North Central (IL)	2	–	6	–	0	2	–	7	–	0
North Park	0	–	8	–	0	0	–	9	–	0
$ – Conference champion; ^ – NCAA Division III playoff participant

The 1984 Augustana (Illinois) Vikings football team was an American football team that represented Augustana College as a member of the College Conference of Illinois and Wisconsin (CCIW) during the 1984 NCAA Division III football season. In their sixth season under head coach Bob Reade, the Vikings compiled a perfect 12–0 record and won the CCIW championship. The team then advanced to the NCAA Division III playoffs where they defeated Dayton in the quarterfinal, Union (NY) in the semifinal, and Central (IA) in the national championship game. It was the second of four consecutive national championships.

The team's statistical leaders included Kirk Bednar with 602 passing yards, Brad Price with 1,034 rushing yards, Ron Nelson with 1,001 rushing yards, Norm Singbush with 475 receiving yards, and Ron Nelson with 96 points scored.

They played their home games at Ericson Field in Rock Island, Illinois.

== Schedule ==
Date	Opponent	Site	Result	Attendance	Source
September 15	North Park	Ericson Field; Rock Island, IL	W 47–6	3,000	
September 22	at Carroll (WI)	Waukesha, WI	W 31–22	1,000	
September 29	Wheaton (IL)	Ericson Field; Rock Island, IL	W 45–14	3,500	
October 6	at Illinois Wesleyan	Bloomington, IL	W 35–21	1,500	
October 13	Carthage	Ericson Field; Rock Island, IL	W 56–7	3,500	
October 20	at Millikin	Decatur, IL	W 19–16	1,200	
October 27	North Central (IL)	Ericson Field; Rock Island, IL	W 28–0	800	
November 3	at Illinois Benedictine*	Lisle, IL	W 28–7	1,000	
November 10	at Elmhurst	Elmhurst, IL	W 21–0	1,500	
November 17	at Dayton*	Dayton, OH (NCAA Division III quarterfinal))	W 14–13		
November 24	Union (NY)*	Rock Island Public Schools Stadium; Rock Island, IL (NCAA Division III semifinal)	W 23–6		
December 8	vs. Central (IA)*	Galbreath Field; Kings Mills, OH (Stagg Bowl—NCAA Division III championship game)	W 21–12		
*Non-conference game
