= Alfred Robertson =

Alfred Robertson may refer to:

- Alfred J. Robertson (1891–1948), American sportsman, coach, and college athletics administrator
- Alfred M. Robertson (1911–1975), horse racing jockey in American Thoroughbred
- Alfred W. Robertson (1891–1958), California state assemblyman
