= Augustana Vikings football =

Augustana Vikings football may refer to:

- Augustana (Illinois) Vikings football, the college football team of Augustana College in Rock Island, Illinois
- Augustana University Vikings football, the college football team of Augustana University in Sioux Falls, South Dakota
