= 1983 Augustana (Illinois) Vikings football team =

American college football season

1983 Augustana (Illinois) Vikings football

NCAA Division III champion CCIW champion

Stagg Bowl, W 21–17 vs. Union (NY)
- Conference: College Conference of Illinois and Wisconsin
- Record: 12–0 (8–0 CCIW)
- Head coach: Bob Reade (5th season)
- Captains: Jay Penney; Doug McCoy; Pete Kasap; Craig Allison
- Home stadium: Ericson Field

1983 College Conference of Illinois and Wisconsin football standings
| | Conf. | | | | | Overall |
| Team | W | | L | | T | W | | L | | T |
|---|---|---|---|---|---|---|---|---|---|---|
| Augustana (IL) $^ | 8 | – | 0 | – | 0 | 12 | – | 0 | – | 0 |
| Elmhurst | 6 | – | 2 | – | 0 | 7 | – | 2 | – | 0 |
| Wheaton (IL) | 5 | – | 3 | – | 0 | 6 | – | 3 | – | 0 |
| Illinois Wesleyan | 5 | – | 3 | – | 0 | 5 | – | 4 | – | 0 |
| Millikin | 4 | – | 4 | – | 0 | 4 | – | 5 | – | 0 |
| Carthage | 3 | – | 5 | – | 0 | 4 | – | 5 | – | 0 |
| North Central (IL) | 3 | – | 5 | – | 0 | 4 | – | 5 | – | 0 |
| North Park | 2 | – | 6 | – | 0 | 3 | – | 6 | – | 0 |
| Carroll (WI) | 0 | – | 8 | – | 0 | 0 | – | 8 | – | 0 |
$ – Conference champion; ^ – NCAA Division III playoff participant

The 1983 Augustana (Illinois) Vikings football team was an American football team that represented Augustana College as a member of the College Conference of Illinois and Wisconsin (CCIW) during the 1983 NCAA Division III football season. In their fifth season under head coach Bob Reade, the Vikings compiled a perfect 12–0 record and won the CCIW championship. The team then advanced to the NCAA Division III playoffs where they defeated Adrian in the quarterfinal, Wisconsin–La Crosse in the semifinal, and Union (NY) in the national championship game. It was the first of four consecutive national championships.

The team's statistical leaders included quarterback Jay Penney with 905 passing yards, halfback Craig Allison with 1,223 rushing yards and 102 points scored, wingback George Velasquez with 1,110 rushing yards, and Norm Singbush with 537 receiving yards.

They played their home games at Ericson Field in Rock Island, Illinois.

== Schedule ==
| Date | Opponent | Site | Result | Attendance | Source |
|---|---|---|---|---|---|
| September 17 | Carroll (WI) | Ericson Field; Rock Island, IL | W 42–14 | 2,000 | |
| September 24 | at Wheaton (IL) | Wheaton, IL | W 47–12 | 2,500–3,500 | |
| October 1 | Illinois Wesleyan | Ericson Field; Rock Island, IL | W 21–16 | 2,500–3,000 | |
| October 8 | at Carthage | Kenosha, WI | W 28–7 | 2,000–3,500 | |
| October 15 | Millikin^{†} | Ericson Field; Rock Island, IL | W 35–14 | 3,000–4,000 | |
| October 22 | at North Central (IL) | Naperville, IL | W 26–6 | 2,100 | |
| October 29 | Olivet Nazarene* | Ericson Field; Rock Island, IL | W 56–7 | 800–1,000 | |
| November 5 | Elmhurst | Ericson Field; Rock Island, IL | W 23–16 | 3,500 | |
| November 12 | at North Park | Chicago, IL | W 35–16 | 1,000–1,500 | |
| November 19 | Adrian* | Ericson Field; Rock Island, IL NCAA Division III quarterfinal | W 22–21 | 3,200 | |
| November 26 | Wisconsin–La Crosse* | Rock Island Public Schools Stadium; Rock Island, IL (NCAA Division III semifinal) | W 21–15 | 3,200 | |
| December 3 | vs. Union (NY)* | Galbreath Field; Kings Mills, OH (Stagg Bowl—NCAA Division III championship game) | W 21–17 | 3,800 | |
*Non-conference game; ^{†}Homecoming
