= Robertson Memorial Field House =

Demolished venue at Bradley University in Peoria, Illinois

Coordinates: 40°41′57″N 89°37′4″W

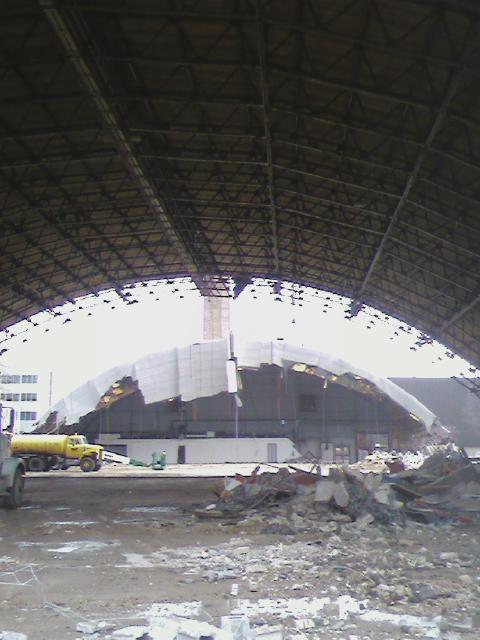
Demolition of the Field House, April 2008

Robertson Memorial Field House was a multi-purpose arena on the Bradley University campus in Peoria, Illinois. The arena, built inside two surplus World War II airplane hangars in 1949 for $400,000 ($5.4 million in present terms), had a 3-foot (1 meter) raised floor as its sports court and event stage.

The Field House was dedicated on December 17, 1949, and named in honor of Alfred J. Robertson, usually known as "Robbie" or "A.J.", who served as Bradley's coach and athletic director for 28 years. When it opened, it had a seating capacity of 8,300, but more aisles and wider seats soon reduced capacity to 7,800. Since a 2004 renovation, its capacity had been 5,000.

From 1949 to 1982, it was home to the Bradley University men's basketball team, whose winning record there was 400–100 before they moved to Carver Arena in 1982. From 1982 until 2008, the women's basketball and volleyball teams played their home games at the arena. It hosted the Missouri Valley Conference men's basketball tournament title game in 1980. The 2007–2008 season was the final year of use for Robertson Memorial Field House; it hosted NCAA women's basketball and volleyball.

In April 2008, Robertson Memorial Field House was demolished. Bradley's new women's basketball arena, the Renaissance Coliseum, opened in October 2011 on the same plot previously occupied by the Field House.
