= 1985 Augustana (Illinois) Vikings football team =

American college football season

1985 Augustana (Illinois) Vikings football

NCAA Division III champion CCIW champion

Stagg Bowl, W 20–7 vs. Ithaca
- Conference: College Conference of Illinois and Wisconsin
- Record: 13–0 (8–0 CCIW)
- Head coach: Bob Reade (7th season)
- Home stadium: Ericson Field

1985 College Conference of Illinois and Wisconsin football standings
	Conf.					Overall
Team	W		L		T	W		L		T
Augustana (IL) $^	8	–	0	–	0	13	–	0	–	0
Elmhurst	6	–	2	–	0	7	–	2	–	0
Millikin	6	–	2	–	0	7	–	2	–	0
Wheaton (IL)	6	–	2	–	0	6	–	3	–	0
Illinois Wesleyan	3	–	5	–	0	3	–	6	–	0
North Central (IL)	2	–	6	–	0	3	–	6	–	0
Carroll (WI)	2	–	6	–	0	2	–	7	–	0
North Park	2	–	6	–	0	2	–	7	–	0
Carthage	1	–	7	–	0	1	–	8	–	0
$ – Conference champion; ^ – NCAA Division III playoff participant

The 1985 Augustana (Illinois) Vikings football team was an American football team that represented Augustana College as a member of the College Conference of Illinois and Wisconsin (CCIW) during the 1985 NCAA Division III football season. In their seventh season under head coach Bob Reade, the Vikings compiled a perfect 13–0 record and won the CCIW championship. The team then advanced to the NCAA Division III playoffs where they defeated Mount Union in the quarterfinal, Central (IA) in the semifinal, and Ithaca in the national championship game. It was the third of four consecutive national championships.

The team's statistical leaders included Greg Wallace with 423 passing yards, Brad Price with 1,087 rushing yards, Eric Welgat with 268 receiving yards, and Shan McCormick with 84 points scored.

They played their home games at Ericson Field in Rock Island, Illinois.

== Schedule ==
Date	Opponent	Site	Result	Attendance	Source
September 14	at North Park	Chicago, IL	W 21–7	1,500	
September 21	Carroll (WI)	Ericson Field; Rock Island, IL	W 50–0	2,000	
September 28	at Wheaton (IL)	Wheaton, IL	W 26–14	2,800	
October 5	Illinois Wesleyan	Ericson Field; Rock Island, IL	W 30–7	1,200	
October 12	at Carthage	Kenosha, WI	W 38–8	800	
October 19	Millikin	Ericson Field; Rock Island, IL	W 9–3	4,000	
October 26	at North Central (IL)	Naperville, IL	W 28–0	1,000	
November 2	Illinois Benedictine*	Ericson Field; Rock Island, IL	W 41–3	1,800	
November 9	Elmhurst	Ericson Field; Rock Island, IL	W 35–0	700	
November 23	Albion	Rock Island Public Schools Stadium; Rock Island, IL (NCAA Division III first round)	W 26–10		
November 30	Mount Union	Rock Island Public Schools Stadium; Rock Island, IL (NCAA Division III quarterfinal)	W 21–14		
December 7	Central (IA)	Rock Island Public Schools Stadium; Rock Island, IL (NCAA Division III semifinal)	W 14–7		
December 14	vs. Ithaca	Garrett–Harrison Stadium; Phenix City, AL (Stagg Bowl—NCAA Division III championship game)	W 20–7		
*Non-conference game
