= Ben Newcomb =

American football and baseball coach

Biographical details
- Born: c. 1935

Playing career

Football
- 1956: Augustana (SD)

Coaching career (HC unless noted)

Football
- c. 1968: Eastern Illinois (assistant)
- 1969–1978: Augustana (IL)

Baseball
- 1966: Eastern Illinois

Head coaching record
- Overall: 55–34–1 (football); 9–17 (baseball)
- Tournaments: Football; 0–1 (NCAA D-III playoffs)

Accomplishments and honors

Championships
- Football; 1 CCIW (1975)

Ben Newcomb (born c. 1935) is an American former football and baseball coach. He served as the head football coach at Augustana College in Rock Island, Illinois from 1969 to 1978, compiling a record of 55–34–1. Newcomb was also the head baseball coach at Eastern Illinois University for one season, in 1966, tallying a mark of 9–17. Newcomb graduated from Augustana College—now known as Augustana University—in Sioux Falls, South Dakota. He coached in the public schools in Sioux Falls before moving to Eastern Illinois. Newcomb resigned as head football coach at Augustana following the 1978 season to become director of the school's College Center.

== Head coaching record ==
=== Football ===
Year	Team	Overall	Conference	Standing	Bowl/playoffs
Augustana (Illinois) Vikings (College Conference of Illinois and Wisconsin) (1969–1978)
1969	Augustana	7–2	6–1	2nd	
1970	Augustana	3–6	3–5	6th	
1971	Augustana	5–4	5–3	T–2nd	
1972	Augustana	6–3	5–3	T–3rd	
1973	Augustana	7–2	6–2	T–2nd	
1974	Augustana	5–3–1	4–3–1	T–4th	
1975	Augustana	7–2	6–2	1st	
1976	Augustana	7–2	6–2	2nd	L NCAA Division III Quarterfinal
1977	Augustana	4–5	4–4	T–4th	
1978	Augustana	4–5	3–5	6th	
Augustana:		55–34–1	48–30–1		
Total:		55–34–1			
National championship Conference title Conference division title or championship game berth
