= Ralph Starenko =

American football coach

Biographical details
- Born: May 12, 1932; Detroit, Michigan, U.S.
- Died: February 9, 2020 (aged 87); Evanston, Illinois, U.S.

Playing career
- c. 1953: Valparaiso
- c. 1955: Quantico Marines

Coaching career (HC unless noted)
- 1956–1958: Valparaiso (freshmen)
- 1959–1963: Concordia (NE)
- 1964–1968: Augustana (IL)
- 1969–1976: Augustana (SD)

Head coaching record
- Overall: 84–77–6

Accomplishments and honors

Championships
- 2 Tri-State (1960, 1962); 2 CCIW (1966, 1968)

Ralph Edward Starenko (May 15, 1932 – February 9, 2020) was an American college football coach. He served as the head football coach at Concordia Teachers College—know known as Concordia University Nebraska—from 1959 to 1963, Augustana College in Rock Island, Illinois from 1964 to 1968, and Augustana College—now known as Augustana University in Sioux Falls, South Dakota from 1969 to 1976, compiling a career college football coaching record of 84–77–6. He played college football at Valparaiso University, from which he graduated in 1954.

Starenko was born and raised in Detroit. He died on February 9, 2020, at his home in Evanston, Illinois.

== Head coaching record ==
Year	Team	Overall	Conference	Standing	Bowl/playoffs
Concordia Bulldogs (Nebraska College Conference) (1959)
1959	Concordia	3–6	2–6	8th	
Concordia Bulldogs (Tri-State Conference) (1960–1963)
1960	Concordia	7–1–1	5–0–1	1st	
1961	Concordia	3–6	2–4	T–5th	
1962	Concordia	7–2	5–1	T–1st	
1963	Concordia	6–3	5–1	2nd	
Concordia:		26–18–1	19–12–1		
Augustana (Illinois) Vikings (College Conference of Illinois and Wisconsin) (1964–1968)
1964	Augustana	7–1	5–1	2nd	
1965	Augustana	4–2–2	2–2–2	4th	
1966	Augustana	6–2–1	5–1	1st	
1967	Augustana	4–5	3–3	4th	
1968	Augustana	6–3	6–1	1st	
Augustana (IL):		27–13–3	21–8–2		
Augustana (South Dakota) Vikings (North Central Conference) (1969–1976)
1969	Augustana	3–6	1–5	7th	
1970	Augustana	4–6	3–3	4th	
1971	Augustana	1–8–1	0–6	7th	
1972	Augustana	2–8	1–6	T–7th	
1973	Augustana	6–3–1	3–3–1	5th	
1974	Augustana	4–6	2–5	7th	
1975	Augustana	7–3	5–2	3rd	
1976	Augustana	4–6	1–5	6th	
Augustana (SD):		31–46–2	16–35–1		
Total:		84–77–6			
National championship Conference title Conference division title or championship game berth
