= Ollie Olson =

American football, basketball, track, and cross country coach

Playing career

Football
- 1931–1933: Northwestern
- Position: kicker

Coaching career (HC unless noted)

Football
- 1935: Boston University (freshman)
- 1936–1938: Carleton (assistant)
- 1939–1942: Macalester
- 1946–1947: Black Hills State
- 1948–1949: Beloit
- 1950: Augustana (IL)
- 1957–1958: West Liberty State

Basketball
- 1950–1951: Augustana (IL)
- 1951–1953: Regis
- 1953–1957: West Liberty State
- 1959–1964: West Liberty State

Track
- 1935–1936: Boston University
- 1936–1939: Carleton

Head coaching record
- Overall: 34–46–8 (football); 155–106 (basketball)

Accomplishments and honors

Championships
- Football; 1 SDIC (1946) Basketball; 3 WVIAC Tournament (1952, 1957, 1960); 1 WVIAC regular season (1961)

Awards
- Second-team All-Big Ten (1931); Black Hills State Athletics Hall of Fame

Oliver M. Olson was an American football, basketball, track, and cross country coach. He served as the head football coach at Macalester College (1939–1942), Black Hills Teachers College—now known as Black Hills State University (1946–1947), Beloit College (1948–1949), Augustana College in Rock Island, Illinois (1950), and West Liberty University (1957–1958). Olson was also the head basketball coach Augustana during the 1950–51 season and at West Liberty, serving two stints (1953–1957) and (1959–1964), leading his team to one West Virginia Intercollegiate Athletic Conference (WVIAC) regular season championship (1961) and three conference tournament titles (1952, 1957, 1960).

Olson played college football at Northwestern University, lettering in 1931, 1932, and 1933. He also ran track at Northwestern. Olson was the head track coach and an assistant football coach for three seasons at Carlton College before he was hired at Macalester. He is a member of both the Black Hills State Hall of Fame (inducted in 1985) and the West Liberty State Hall of Fame (inducted in 1982).

== Head coaching record ==
=== Football ===
Year	Team	Overall	Conference	Standing	Bowl/playoffs
Macalester Scots (Minnesota Intercollegiate Athletic Conference) (1939–1942)
1939	Macalester	4–1–3	2–1–3	3rd	
1940	Macalester	5–1–1	4–1–1	3rd	
1941	Macalester	5–3	4–2	2nd	
1942	Macalester	4–4	2–3	T–6th	
Macalester:		18–9–4	12–7–3		
Black Hills Yellow Jackets (South Dakota Intercollegiate Conference) (1946–1947)
1946	Black Hills	5–2	3–0	1st	
1947	Black Hills	3–4–2	1–1–1	3rd	
Black Hills:		8–6–2	4–1–1		
Beloit Blue Devils (Midwest Conference) (1948–1949)
1948	Beloit	0–7–1	0–5–1	9th	
1949	Beloit	2–6	1–5	T–7th	
Beloit:		2–13–1	1–10–1		
Augustana (Illinois) Vikings (College Conference of Illinois) (1950)
1950	Augustana	2–6	1–4	6th	
Augustana (IL):		2–6	1–4		
West Liberty Hilltoppers (West Virginia Intercollegiate Athletic Conference) (1957–1958)
1957	West Liberty	2–6–1	2–3–1	7th	
1958	West Liberty	2–6	2–6	10th	
West Liberty:		4–12–1	4–9–1		
Total:		34–46–8			
National championship Conference title Conference division title or championship game berth
