= Steve Bell (American football) =

American football coach

Current position
- Title: Head coach
- Team: Augustana (IL)
- Conference: CCIW
- Record: 48–56

Biographical details
- Education: Bemidji State (1992)

Coaching career (HC unless noted)
- 1992–1994: Bemidji State (assistant)
- 1995–1999: MacMurray (OC)
- 2000–2014: Monmouth (IL)
- 2015–present: Augustana (IL)

Head coaching record
- Overall: 160–100
- Bowls: 0–1
- Tournaments: 2–4 (NCAA D-III playoffs)

Accomplishments and honors

Championships
- 4 MWC (2005, 2008–2009, 2011)

Steve Bell is an American college football coach. He is the head football coach for Augustana College in Rock Island, Illinois, a position he has held since 2015. Bell served as the head football coach at Monmouth College in Monmouth, Illinois from 2000 to 2014.

== Head coaching record ==
Year	Team	Overall	Conference	Standing	Bowl/playoffs
Monmouth Fighting Scots (Midwest Conference) (2000–2014)
2000	Monmouth	3–7	3–6	T–6th	
2001	Monmouth	8–2	6–2	3rd	
2002	Monmouth	5–5	5–4	T–4th	
2003	Monmouth	8–2	8–1	2nd	
2004	Monmouth	9–1	8–1	2nd	
2005	Monmouth	10–1	9–0	1st	L NCAA Division III First Round
2006	Monmouth	7–3	7–2	T–2nd	
2007	Monmouth	7–3	7–2	T–2nd	
2008	Monmouth	11–1	9–0	1st	L NCAA Division III Second Round
2009	Monmouth	10–1	9–0	1st	L NCAA Division III First Round
2010	Monmouth	6–4	6–3	T–2nd	
2011	Monmouth	10–2	9–0	1st	L NCAA Division III Second Round
2012	Monmouth	5–5	5–4	T–5th	
2013	Monmouth	5–5	5–4	T–6th	
2014	Monmouth	8–2	4–1	2nd (South)	
Monmouth:		112–44	100–30		
Augustana (Illinois) Vikings (College Conference of Illinois and Wisconsin) (2015–present)
2015	Augustana	4–6	3–4	5th	
2016	Augustana	3–7	2–6	7th	
2017	Augustana	1–9	1–7	T–8th	
2018	Augustana	4–6	3–6	7th	
2019	Augustana	6–4	5–4	6th	
2020–21	Augustana	1–2	1–2	4th	
2021	Augustana	5–5	4–5	5th	
2022	Augustana	5–5	4–5	6th	
2023	Augustana	8–3	7–2	3rd	L Isthmus
2024	Augustana	4–6	3–6	T–7th	
2025	Augustana	7–3	6–3	4th	
2026	Augustana	0–0	0–0		
Augustana:		48–56	39–50		
Total:		160–100			
National championship Conference title Conference division title or championship game berth
