= Carl Peterson (American football) =

American football player (1897–1964)

No. 6
- Position: Center

Personal information
- Born: March 26, 1897; Salt Lake City, Utah, U.S.
- Died: July 1, 1964 (aged 67); Kansas, U.S.
- Listed height: 5 ft 11 in (1.80 m)
- Listed weight: 175 lb (79 kg)

Career information
- High school: Bethany Academy
- College: Nebraska

Career history
- Kansas City Blues (1924)

Awards and highlights
- Third-team All-Pro (1924); Third-team All-American (1922)
- Stats at Pro Football Reference

Carl John "'Swede" Peterson (March 26, 1897 – July 1, 1964) was an American football player and coach. He played college football for Nebraska and professionally for one season in the National Football League (NFL) as a center for the Kansas City Blues in 1924. He was selected as a third-team center on the 1924 All-Pro Team.

Peterson later served for three seasons as the head coach of the Augustana (Illinois) Vikings football team.

== Head coaching record ==
=== Football ===
Year	Team	Overall	Conference	Standing	Bowl/playoffs
Augustana (Illinois) Vikings (Illinois Intercollegiate Athletic Conference) (1925–1927)
1925	Augustana	4–3–1	4–3–1	T–9th	
1926	Augustana	5–2–1	4–2–1	7th	
1927	Augustana	2–5	1–5	19th	
Augustana:		11–10–2	9–10–2		
Total:		11–10–2			
