= Garland Gregory =

American football player (1919–2011)

No. 32
- Positions: Guard, linebacker

Personal information
- Born: March 18, 1919; Vixen, Louisiana, U.S.
- Died: April 28, 2011 (aged 92); Ruston, Louisiana, U.S.
- Listed height: 5 ft 11 in (1.80 m)
- Listed weight: 185 lb (84 kg)

Career information
- High school: Columbia (Columbia, Louisiana)
- College: Louisiana Tech
- NFL draft: 1942: undrafted

Career history
- San Francisco 49ers (1946–1947)

Awards and highlights
- First-team Little All-American (1941)

Career NFL statistics
- Games played: 27
- Games started: 20
- Stats at Pro Football Reference

Garland D. Gregory (March 8, 1919 – April 28, 2011) was an All-America Football Conference (AAFC) guard who played two seasons with the San Francisco 49ers. He played college football at Louisiana Polytechnic Institute and attended Columbia High School in Columbia, Louisiana.

== College career ==
Gregory lettered for the Louisiana Tech Bulldogs from 1940 to 1941. He became the school's first Associated Press first-team All-American in 1941.

== Military career ==
Gregory volunteered to serve in the United States Army Air Forces on December 8, 1941 and was a first lieutenant with the 4th Air Force. Gregory was chosen to play football with the Fourth Air Force Flyers and Hollywood Bears.

== Professional career ==
Gregory played for the San Francisco 49ers of the AAFC from 1946 to 1947. He was named Second-team All-AAFC by the New York Daily News in 1947.

== Coaching career ==
He coached at various schools after his playing career, including Bastrop High School in Bastrop, Louisiana, the Virginia Military Institute and El Dorado High School in El Dorado, Arkansas. He helped the El Dorado High School Wildcats win back-to-back state championships in 1958 and 1959.
