= George Watts (American football) =

American football player (1914–1990)

No. 15
- Position: Offensive tackle

Personal information
- Born: July 12, 1914; McAdenville, North Carolina, U.S.
- Died: July 11, 1990 (aged 75); Johnson City, Tennessee, U.S.
- Listed height: 6 ft 1 in (1.85 m)
- Listed weight: 225 lb (102 kg)

Career information
- High school: Shelby (NC)
- College: Appalachian State (1938–1941)
- NFL draft: 1942: 17th round, 156th overall pick

Career history
- Washington Redskins (1942)

Awards and highlights
- NFL champion (1942); Pro Bowl (1942); Second-team Little All-American (1941)

Career NFL statistics
- Games played: 8
- Games started: 0
- Stats at Pro Football Reference

George S. Watts (July 12, 1914 – July 11, 1990) was an American professional football offensive tackle in the National Football League (NFL) for the Washington Redskins. He played college football at Appalachian State University and was selected in the 17th round of the 1942 NFL draft. He was the first player in Appalachian State school history to be drafted by the NFL.
