= Jim Barnes (American football, born 1959) =

American football player and coach

Biographical details
- Born: c. 1959
- Education: Augustana (IL) (1981); Illinois College of Law (1985)

Playing career
- 1977–1981: Augustana (IL)
- Position: Defensive back

Coaching career (HC unless noted)
- 1987: Marietta (assistant)
- 1988–1994: Ohio Wesleyan (assistant)
- 1995–1999: Wooster
- 2000–2010: Augustana (IL)

Head coaching record
- Overall: 116–47
- Tournaments: 2–2 (NCAA D-III playoffs)

Accomplishments and honors

Championships
- 1 NCAC (1997); 3 CCIW (2001, 2005–2006)

Awards
- NCAC Coach of the Year (1997); CCIW Coach of the Year (2005)

Jim Barnes (born c. 1959) is an American former football player and coach. He served as the head football coach at Wooster College in Wooster, Ohio from 1995 to 1999 and his alma mater, Augustana College in Rock Island, Illinois, from 2000 to 2010, compiling a career college football coaching record of 116–47.

== Head coaching record ==
=== College ===
| Year | Team | Overall | Conference | Standing | Bowl/playoffs |
|---|---|---|---|---|---|
Wooster Fighting Scots (North Coast Athletic Conference) (1995–1999)
| 1995 | Wooster | 5–5 | 5–3 | 4th | |
| 1996 | Wooster | 7–3 | 6–2 | 3rd | |
| 1997 | Wooster | 9–1 | 7–1 | T–1st | |
| 1998 | Wooster | 8–2 | 6–2 | 3rd | |
| 1999 | Wooster | 8–2 | 4–2 | T–2nd | |
| Wooster: | | 37–13 | 28–10 | | |
Augustana (Illinois) Vikings (College Conference of Illinois and Wisconsin) (2000–2010)
| 2000 | Augustana | 7–3 | 4–3 | 4th | |
| 2001 | Augustana | 10–2 | 6–1 | T–1st | L NCAA Division III Second Round |
| 2002 | Augustana | 7–2 | 6–1 | 2nd | |
| 2003 | Augustana | 7–3 | 6–1 | 2nd | |
| 2004 | Augustana | 7–3 | 5–2 | 3rd | |
| 2005 | Augustana | 10–2 | 7–0 | 1st | L NCAA Division III Second Round |
| 2006 | Augustana | 7–3 | 6–1 | T–1st | |
| 2007 | Augustana | 5–5 | 3–4 | T–5th | |
| 2008 | Augustana | 7–3 | 5–2 | T–2nd | |
| 2009 | Augustana | 6–4 | 4–3 | T–3rd | |
| 2010 | Augustana | 6–4 | 4–3 | T–3rd | |
| Augustana: | | 79–34 | 56–21 | | |
| Total: | | 116–47 | | | |
National championship Conference title Conference division title or championship game berth
