= Rob Cushman =

American football player and coach (born 1956)

Biographical details
- Born: 1956 (age 69–70)

Playing career
- 1974–1978: Puget Sound
- Position: Defensive back

Coaching career (HC unless noted)
- 1979–1980: Chico State (assistant)
- 1981–1983: Butte (DC)
- 1984–1985: Marysville HS (CA)
- 1986: St. Helena HS (CA)
- 1987–1996: Eastern Oregon (DC)
- 1997–2001: Eastern Oregon
- 2002–2006: Feather River
- 2007: Ithaca (ST/DB)
- 2008–2010: Augustana (IL) (DC)
- 2011–2014: Augustana
- 2015–2016: Minnesota–Morris
- 2017–2019: Occidental
- 2021–2022: Pasadena City (co-OC / QB / RB)

Head coaching record
- Overall: 46–83 (college); 34–21 (junior college)

Robert J. Cushman (born 1956) is an American football coach. He was the co-offensive coordinator, quarterbacks coach, and running backs coach at Pasadena City College in Pasadena, California, from 2021 to 2022. Cushman served as the head football coach at Eastern Oregon University from 1997 to 2001, Augustana College in Rock Island, Illinois from 2011 to 2014, the University of Minnesota Morris from 2015 to 2016, and Occidental College from 2017 until the football program's discontinuation in 2020. Cushman was also the head football coach at Feather River College, a community college in Quincy, California, from 2004 to 2006.

== Coaching career ==
=== Eastern Oregon ===
Cushman's college head coaching career started in 1997 at Eastern Oregon University after being promoted from defensive coordinator, a position that he had held for ten years. He resigned as the Mountaineers' head coach in 2001 with an 18-31 record.

=== Feather River ===
In 2002, Cushman landed his second head coaching job at Feather River College in Quincy, California. He led the Golden Eagles to five consecutive bowl games and a 34–21 overall record. After the 2006 season, Cushman resigned.

=== Augustana ===
Cushman went to Augustana College (Illinois) in 2008 to become their defensive coordinator. In 2008, the Vikings' defense under Cushman allowed only 13.4 points per game, ranked seventh in NCAA Division III and first in their conference (CCIW). The Vikings' defense allowed 16.7 points per game in 2009, and 18.8 points per game in 2010.

Cushman was named the Augustana Vikings head coach on November 24, 2010 after four years as defensive coordinator. He resigned on December 2, 2014 with a 17–23 record as the head coach. During his time as the head coach at Augustana, Cushman helped produce five Academic All-Americans, a National Football Foundation Scholar and an NCAA Division III All-American. In addition, 22 Vikings earned all-conference recognition under Cushman.

=== Minnesota–Morris ===
On April 1, 2015, Rob Cushman was named the 17th head coach at the University of Minnesota Morris for the Cougars football team. On October 3, 2015, Cushman lead the Cougars to their first homecoming victory since 2006, a 44–43 win over MacMurray. After a poor 0–10 finish in 2014, Cushman improved the Cougars football team to a 4–6 record in his first season as their head coach.

=== Occidental ===
Cushman was named head football coach at Occidental College on August 1, 2017. His first game came against his alma mater, the University of Puget Sound, on September 9, 2017.

== Head coaching record ==
=== College ===
Year	Team	Overall	Conference	Standing	Bowl/playoffs	NAIA^{#}
Eastern Oregon Mountaineers (NAIA independent) (1997–1998)
1997	Eastern Oregon	4–6				
1998	Eastern Oregon	6–4				25
Eastern Oregon Mountaineers (NCAA Division III independent) (1999–2001)
1999	Eastern Oregon	5–5				
2000	Eastern Oregon	2–8				
2001	Eastern Oregon	1–8				
Eastern Oregon:		18–31				
Augustana (Illinois) Vikings (College Conference of Illinois and Wisconsin) (2011–2014)
2011	Augustana	2–8	2–5	7th		
2012	Augustana	5–5	4–3	4th		
2013	Augustana	5–5	3–4	4th		
2014	Augustana	5–5	4–3	3rd		
Augustana:		17–23	13–15			
Minnesota–Morris Cougars (Upper Midwest Athletic Conference) (2015–2016)
2015	Minnesota–Morris	4–6	4–5	T–5th		
2016	Minnesota–Morris	6–4	5–4	5th		
Minnesota Morris:		10–10	9–9			
Occidental Tigers (Southern California Intercollegiate Athletic Conference) (2017–2019)
2017	Occidental	0–3	0–0	NA		
2018	Occidental	1–8	0–7	8th		
2019	Occidental	0–8	0–7	8th		
Occidental:		1–19	0–14			
Total:		46–83				
^{#}Rankings from final NAIA poll.

=== Junior college ===
Year	Team	Overall	Conference	Standing	Bowl/playoffs
Feather River Golden Eagles (Golden Valley Conference) (2002–2006)
2002	Feather River	6–5	2–3	4th	L CLO Bowl
2003	Feather River	9–2	4–1	2nd	L Tri-Counties Bank Holiday Bowl
2004	Feather River	6–5	3–2	2nd	W East County Bowl
2005	Feather River	7–4	4–1	2nd	L Silicon Valley Bowl
2006	Feather River	6–5	2–3	4th	L Capital Shrine Bowl
Feather River:		34–21	13–10		
Total:		34–21			
