= 1941 Little All-America college football team =

The 1941 Little All-America college football team is composed of college football players from small colleges and universities who were selected by the Associated Press (AP) as the best players at each position. For 1941, the AP selected first, second, and third teams.

== First-team ==
Position	Player	Team
B	Marv Tommervik	Pacific Lutheran
B	Noble Smith	Hawaii
B	James Jones	Union (TN)
B	Jack Hunt	Marshall
E	Henry Stanton	Arizona
E	Mike Yurcheshen	Case
T	Dick Moe	Colorado Mines
T	Ed Kromka	Missouri Mines
G	Nick George	Waynesburg
G	Garland Gregory	Louisiana Tech
C	Stuart Clarkson	Texas A&I

== Second-team ==
Position	Player	Team
B	Owen Price	Texas Mines
B	Milt Jannone	Hamilton
B	Virgil Wagner	Millikin
B	Jim Carrier	Wesleyan (CT)
E	Jim Fitzharris	St. Thomas (MN)
E	Charles Schuster	Eastern Kentucky State
T	Tom Barber	Chattanooga
T	George Watts	Appalachian State
G	Anthony Jo Fraiola	Willamette
G	Albert Will	Trinity (CT)
C	Ray Satterlee	Eastern Washington

== Third-team ==
Position	Player	Team
B	Ben Collins	West Texas State
B	Doug Rehor	Dickinson
B	Jim Tarrant	Howard (AL)
B	Tony Colella	Canisius
E	Roland Warren	Howard Payne
E	Bob Metzger	Western Michigan
T	Paul Newell	Nebraska State Teachers
T	Tony Macikas	Cincinnati
G	Steve Vucic	Saint Vincent
G	Louis Gonias	Grinnell
C	Ed Ellis	Catawba

== See also ==
- 1941 College Football All-America Team
