= Alfred J. Robertson =

American football, basketball, and baseball player (1892–1948)

Biographical details
- Born: May 19, 1891; South Haven, Minnesota, U.S.
- Died: October 30, 1948 (aged 57); Rochester, Minnesota, U.S.

Playing career

Football
- 1910–1912: Carleton
- 1913: Minnesota (freshmen)
- 1914–1915: Montana

Basketball
- 1910–1913: Carleton
- 1913–1914: Minnesota (freshmen)
- 1914–1916: Montana
- Positions: Quarterback (football); Forward (basketball); Third baseman (baseball)

Coaching career (HC unless noted)

Football
- 1919: Fort Hays State
- 1920–1947: Bradley / Bradley Tech

Basketball
- 1918–1919: Georgetown (KY)
- 1919–1920: Fort Hays State
- 1920–1948: Bradley / Bradley Tech

Baseball
- 1919: Georgetown (KY)
- 1921–1948: Bradley / Bradley Tech

Track
- 1919: Georgetown (KY)

Administrative career (AD unless noted)
- 1919–1920: Fort Hays State
- 1920–1948: Bradley / Bradley Tech

Head coaching record
- Overall: 147–70–10 (football); 330–198 (basketball); 244–157–6 (baseball, Bradley only)

Accomplishments and honors

Championships
- Football; 4 IIAC (1925–1927, 1937); 1 ICC (1938)

Alfred James "Robbie" Robertson (May 19, 1891 – October 30, 1948) was an American football, basketball, and baseball player, track athlete, coach, and college athletics administrator. He spent most of his coaching career at Bradley University in Peoria, Illinois, where he was the athletic director and head coach in football, basketball, and baseball from 1920 to 1948. Robertson Memorial Field House, the former home basketball venue at Bradley, was named in his honor.

== Playing career ==
A native of South Haven, Minnesota, Robertson lettered in football, basketball, and track at Carleton College. In 1912, he captained the football team and was named All-State quarterback. He played as a forward on Carleton's basketball team and as a third baseman in baseball. Robertson spent the 1913–14 academic year at the University of Minnesota, where he played on the freshman football and basketball squads. He transferred to the University of Montana in 1914, where he lettered in football, basketball, baseball, and track. At Montana, he again played quarterback before graduating in 1916.

== Coaching career ==
Robertson began his coaching career in 1917 at Kentucky Wesleyan College in Owensboro, Kentucky. From January to June 1919, he coached basketball, baseball, and track at Georgetown College in Georgetown, Kentucky. Robertson spent the 1919–20 academic year at Fort Hays Kansas State Normal School—now known as Fort Hays State University—as athletic director and coach of all sports. He led the 1919 Fort Hays football team to a record of 3–6.

== Illness and death ==
Robertson was hospitalized in October 1948, in Peoria, Illinois, and had surgery for a "rare liver aliment" at the Mayo Clinic in Rochester, Minnesota later that month. He died on October 30, at the Saint Mary's Hospital in Rochester, at the age of 57.

== Legacy ==
Robertson Memorial Field House was dedicated to Robertson's memory on December 17, 1949. In 2008, Robertson was named to the Missouri Valley Conference Hall of Fame. A bronze statue, sculted by Fisher Stolz, of Robertson on Bradley University's West Campus was unveiled in December 2012.

== Head coaching record ==
=== Football ===
Year	Team	Overall	Conference	Standing	Bowl/playoffs
Fort Hays State Tigers (Kansas Collegiate Athletic Conference) (1919)
1919	Fort Hays State	3–6	3–4	T–7th	
Fort Hays State:		3–6	3–4		
Bradley Indians/Braves (Independent) (1920–1922)
1920	Bradley	4–4			
1921	Bradley	8–2			
1922	Bradley	9–0–1			
Bradley Indians/Braves (Illinois Intercollegiate Athletic Conference) (1923–1936)
1923	Bradley	6–2	6–2	5th	
1924	Bradley	8–1	7–1	3rd	
1925	Bradley	9–0	5–0	T–1st	
1926	Bradley	9–0	5–0	T–1st	
1927	Bradley	6–3	6–1	1st	
1928	Bradley	7–2	6–1	T–3rd	
1929	Bradley	6–3	4–2	T–7th	
1930	Bradley	4–3–1	2–2–1	T–12th	
1931	Bradley	5–3	4–1	T–2nd	
1932	Bradley	3–3–2	3–1–1	T–4th	
1933	Bradley	3–5–2	3–2–1	12th	
1934	Bradley	5–3	3–2	T–8th	
1935	Bradley	1–6–1	1–5–1	16th	
1936	Bradley	6–3	6–2	T–2nd	
1937	Bradley	6–3	5–0	T–1st	
Bradley Tech Braves (Illinois College Conference) (1938–1945)
1938	Bradley Tech	7–0–1	4–0	T–1st	
1939	Bradley Tech	6–1–2	2–1	6th	
1940	Bradley Tech	4–4	0–2	9th	
1941	Bradley Tech	8–1	1–0	2nd	
1942	Bradley Tech	4–4	0–1	6th	
1943	No team—World War II				
1944	No team—World War II				
1945	No team—World War II				
Bradley Braves (Independent) (1946–1947)
1946	Bradley	7–2			
1947	Bradley	3–6			
Bradley:		144–64–10	72–26–4		
Total:		147–70–10			
National championship Conference title Conference division title or championship game berth
