= Marshall Wells =

American football and basketball coach (1912–1972)

Biographical details
- Born: February 20, 1912; Wisconsin, U.S.
- Died: June 16, 1972 (aged 60); Boulder, Colorado, U.S.

Playing career

Football
- 1930–1933: Minnesota
- Position: Tackle

Coaching career (HC unless noted)

Football
- 1933: Hamline (line)
- 1934: Sioux Falls
- 1935: Iowa State (line)
- 1936–1938: Yale (line)
- 1939: Minnesota (assistant)
- 1940–1941: Millikin
- 1946–1947: Millikin
- 1948–1958: Colorado (line)

Basketball
- 1934–1935: Sioux Falls
- 1940–1942: Millikin
- 1945–1946: Millikin

Administrative career (AD unless noted)
- 1945–1948: Millikin

Head coaching record
- Overall: 24–15–1 (football); 27–25 (basketball, Millikin only)

Accomplishments and honors

Championships
- Football; 1 ICC (1941)

Awards
- First-team All-Big Ten (1932)

Marshall Wells (February 20, 1912 – June 16, 1972) was an American college football and college basketball coach. He served as the head football coach at Millikin College in Decatur, Illinois from 1940 to 1941 and again from 1946 to 1957, compiling a record of 18–13–1. Wells was also a faculty member and head basketball coach at Millikin.

== Playing career ==
Wells played college football at the University of Minnesota for the Golden Gophers from 1930 to 1933. He played under the tutelage of two head coaches: Fritz Crisler, who had a 7–3 record his in 1931, his last year at Minnesota, and Bernie Bierman, who led the team to a share of the Big Ten Conference title in 1933.

== Head coaching record ==
=== Football ===
Year	Team	Overall	Conference	Standing	Bowl/playoffs
Sioux Falls Braves (South Dakota Intercollegiate Conference) (1934)
1934	Sioux Falls	6–2	5–2	3rd	
Sioux Falls:		6–2	5–2		
Millikin Big Blue (Illinois College Conference) (1940–1941)
1940	Millikin	5–3	4–2	T–3rd	
1941	Millikin	8–0	6–0	1st	
Millikin Big Blue (College Conference of Illinois) (1946–1947)
1946	Millikin	2–6	1–3	6th	
1947	Millikin	3–4–1	2–2–1	T–5th	
Millikin:		18–13–1	13–7–1		
Total:		24–15–1			
National championship Conference title Conference division title or championship game berth
