= Virgil Wagner =

American gridiron football player (1922–1997)

No. 78
- Position: Left halfback

Personal information
- Born: February 27, 1922; Belleville, Illinois, U.S.
- Died: August 22, 1997 (aged 75)

Career information
- College: Millikin
- NFL draft: 1943: 29 / Pick 271; Detroit Lionsth round

Career history
- 1946–1954: Montreal Alouettes

Awards and highlights
- Grey Cup champion (1949); Jeff Russel Memorial Trophy (1947); 4× CFL East All-Star (1946, 1947, 1948, 1949); First-team Little All-American (1942); Second-team Little All-American (1941)
- Canadian Football Hall of Fame (Class of 1980)

Virgil Wagner (February 27, 1922 – August 22, 1997) was an American all-star and Grey Cup champion Canadian football halfback for the Montreal Alouettes. He was inducted into the Canadian Football Hall of Fame in 1980.

Wagner was elected to the Millikin Athletic Hall of Fame at Millikin University in Illinois, his hometown Hall of Fame in Belleville, IL, and the Canadian Football Hall of Fame.
