= Galbreath Field =

Sports venue in Ohio, United States

Coordinates: 39°21′16″N 84°15′28″W

Galbreath Field was an American football and soccer field in Kings Mills, Ohio, that was associated with the former College Football Hall of Fame. Named after John Galbreath, the 7,000–10,000 seat stadium (sources differ) was the home of the Moeller High School Crusaders from 1980 to 2001 and the Kings High School Knights until Kings Stadium was built. It was also home to the Cincinnati Riverhawks.

The stadium was eventually demolished. In 2024, Mercy Health Kings Mills Hospital opened on the site.
