= Illinois College Conference =

The Illinois College Conference (ICC) was a college athletic conference that operated from 1938 to 1946 in the U.S. state of Illinois. The league was proposed in the spring of 1937 and formed later that year at a meeting in Peoria, Illinois. The ten charter members were Augustana College, Bradley University, Illinois College, Illinois Wesleyan University, Knox College, Lake Forest College, Millikin University, Monmouth College, North Central College, and Wheaton College, all of which had previously been members of the Illinois Intercollegiate Athletic Conference (IIAC), nicknamed the "Little Nineteen". The conference was disbanded in the spring of 1946 and replaced with a new league, the College Conference of Illinois, which was later renamed the College Conference of Illinois and Wisconsin (CCIW).

== Championships ==
=== Football ===
		Record		
Year	Champion	Conference	Overall	Head coach
1938	Bradley Tech; Lake Forest	4–0; 4–0	7–0; 5–2	Alfred J. Robertson; Ralph Jones
1939	Illinois Wesleyan	2–0	4–4	Don Heap
1940	Illinois Wesleyan; Lake Forest	3–0; 3–0	7–1; 6–0–1	Don Heap; Ralph Jones
1941	Millikin	6–0	8–0	Marshall Wells
1942	Millikin	5–0	7–0	Calvin E. Sutherd
