= Augustana College Vikings football =

College football team

Augustana (Illinois) Vikings football
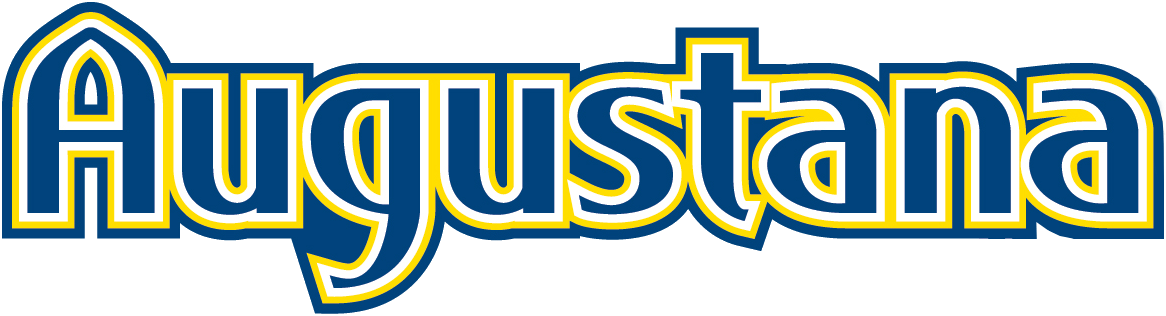
- First season: 1893; 133 years ago
- Athletic director: Mike Zapolski
- Head coach: Steve Bell; 11th season, 48–56 (.462)
- Location: Rock Island, Illinois
- Stadium: Charles D. Lindberg Stadium (capacity: 1,800)
- NCAA division: Division III
- Conference: CCIW
- Colors: Blue and gold
- All-time record: 592–362–26 (.617)

NCAA Division III championships
- 1983, 1984, 1985, 1986

Conference championships
- IIAC: 1934 ICC: 1949 CCIW: 1966, 1968, 1975, 1981, 1982, 1983, 1984, 1985, 1986, 1987, 1988, 1990, 1991, 1993, 1994, 1997, 1999, 2001, 2005, 2006
- Mascot: Vikings
- Website: athletics.augustana.edu

The Augustana Vikings football team represents Augustana College in college football at the NCAA Division III level. The Vikings are members of the College Conference of Illinois and Wisconsin (CCIW), fielding its team in the CCIW since 1946 when it was known as the College Conference of Illinois. The Vikings play their home games at Charles D. Lindberg Stadium in Rock Island, Illinois.

The team's head coach is Steve Bell, who took over the position for the 2015 season.

== Conference affiliation ==
- Independent (1893–1894, 1901–1904)
- Illinois Intercollegiate Athletic Conference (1917–1937)
- Illinois College Conference (1938–1945)
- College Conference of Illinois / College Conference of Illinois and Wisconsin (1946–present)

== List of head coaches ==
=== Key ===
Key to symbols in coaches list
General		Overall		Conference		Postseason (Note: Although the first Rose Bowl Game was played in 1902, it has been continuously played since the 1916 game, and is recognized as the oldest bowl game by the NCAA. "—" indicates any season prior to 1916 when postseason games were not played.)	
No.	Order of coaches (Note: A running total of the number of head coaches, with coaches who served separate tenures being counted only once. Interim head coaches are represented with "Int" and are not counted in the running total. "—" indicates the team played but either without a coach or no coach is on record. "X" indicates an interim year without play.)	GC	Games coached	CW	Conference wins	PW	Postseason wins
DC	Division championships	OW	Overall wins	CL	Conference losses	PL	Postseason losses
CC	Conference championships	OL	Overall losses	CT	Conference ties	PT	Postseason ties
NC	National championships	OT	Overall ties (Note: Overtime rules in college football were introduced in 1996, making ties impossible in the period since.)	C%	Conference winning percentage		
†	Elected to the College Football Hall of Fame	O%	Overall winning percentage (Note: When computing the win–loss percentage, a tie counts as half a win and half a loss.)				

=== Coaches ===
List of head football coaches showing season(s) coached, overall records, and conference records
No.	Coach	Season(s)	GC	OW	OL	OT	O%	CW	CL	CT	C%
1	J. W. Cook	1893	3	2	1	0	0.667	–	–	–	–
2	No coach	1894, 1901	4	1	3	0	0.250	–	–	–	–
3	Paul Coldren	1902–1904	16	8	6	2	0.563	–	–	–	–
4	Ted Davenport	1917	4	2	2	0	0.500	–	–	–	–
5	Leo Liitt	1918	4	3	1	0	0.750	–	–	–	–
6	Art Swedberg	1919–1922	28	14	13	1	0.518	–	–	–	–
7	Wally Swanson	1923–1924	16	5	11	0	0.313	–	–	–	–
8	Carl Peterson	1925–1927	23	11	10	2	0.522	9	10	2	0.476
9	Harold V. Almquist	1928–1940	106	65	31	10	0.660	47	20	7	0.682
10	John Briley	1941–1942, 1946	24	12	12	0	0.500	7	7	0	0.500
11	Lee. C Brissman	1945	4	1	3	0	0.250	–	–	–	–
12	Butch Stolfa	1947–1949	24	14	7	3	0.646	10	4	1	0.700
13	Ollie Olson	1950	8	2	6	0	0.250	1	4	0	0.200
14	Vincent Lundeen	1951–1958	65	23	41	1	0.362	17	31	0	0.354
15	Ray B. Leoschner	1959–1963	44	25	17	2	0.591	15	15	1	0.500
16	Ralph Starenko	1964–1968	43	27	13	3	0.663	21	8	2	0.710
17	Ben Newcomb	1969–1978	90	55	34	1	0.617	48	30	1	0.614
18	Bob Reade	1979–1994	169	146	23	1	0.862	112	12	0	0.903
19	Tom Schmulbach	1995–1999	47	34	13	0	0.723	26	9	0	0.743
20	Jim Barnes	2000–2010	113	79	34	0	0.699	56	21	0	0.727
21	Rob Cushman	2011–2014	40	17	23	0	0.425	13	15	0	0.464
22	Steve Bell	2015–present	104	48	56	0	0.462	39	50	0	0.438

== Year-by-year results ==
National champions	Conference champions	Bowl game berth	Playoff berth

Season	Year	Head coach	Association	Division	Conference	Record							Postseason	Final ranking
Season	Year	Head coach	Association	Division	Conference	Overall			Conference				Postseason	Final ranking
Season	Year	Head coach	Association	Division	Conference	Win	Loss	Tie	Finish	Win	Loss	Tie	Postseason	Final ranking
1893	1893	J. W. Cook	—	—	Independent	2	1	0					—	—
1894	1894	No coach	—	—	Independent	1	1	0					—	—
No team from 1895 to 1900
1901	1901	No coach	—	—	Independent	0	2	0					—	—
1902	1902	Paul Coldren	—	—	Independent	2	2	0					—	—
1903	1903	Paul Coldren	—	—	Independent	2	2	1					—	—
1904	1904	Paul Coldren	—	—	Independent	4	2	1					—	—
No team from 1905 to 1916
1917	1917	Ted Davenport	NCAA	—	IIAC	2	2	0					—	—
1918	1918	Leo Liitt	NCAA	—	IIAC	3	1	0					—	—
1919	1919	Art Swedberg	NCAA	—	IIAC	3	1	0					—	—
1920	1920	Art Swedberg	NCAA	—	IIAC	6	1	1					—	—
1921	1921	Art Swedberg	NCAA	—	IIAC	4	3	0					—	—
1922	1922	Art Swedberg	NCAA	—	IIAC	1	8	0					—	—
1923	1923	Wally Swanson	NCAA	—	IIAC	3	4	0					—	—
1924	1924	Wally Swanson	NCAA	—	IIAC	2	7	0					—	—
1925	1925	Carl Peterson	NCAA	—	IIAC	4	3	1	T–9th	4	3	1	—	—
1926	1926	Carl Peterson	NCAA	—	IIAC	5	2	1	7th	4	2	1	—	—
1927	1927	Carl Peterson	NCAA	—	IIAC	2	5	0	19th	1	5	0	—	—
1928	1928	Harold V. Almquist	NCAA	—	IIAC	7	1	0	T–3rd	6	1	0	—	—
1929	1929	Harold V. Almquist	NCAA	—	IIAC	3	4	1	T–13th	3	3	1	—	—
1930	1930	Harold V. Almquist	NCAA	—	IIAC	4	3	0	T–10th	3	2	0	—	—
1931	1931	Harold V. Almquist	NCAA	—	IIAC	5	2	2	4th	3	1	2	—	—
1932	1932	Harold V. Almquist	NCAA	—	IIAC	6	0	2	3rd	5	0	1	—	—
1933	1933	Harold V. Almquist	NCAA	—	IIAC	7	1	1	T–5th	4	1	1	—	—
1934	1934	Harold V. Almquist	NCAA	—	IIAC	9	0	0	T–1st	6	0	0	Conference champions	—
1935	1935	Harold V. Almquist	NCAA	—	IIAC	5	3	0	10th	3	2	0	—	—
1936	1936	Harold V. Almquist	NCAA	—	IIAC	3	5	0	T–10th	3	3	0	—	—
1937	1937	Harold V. Almquist	NCAA	—	IIAC	5	2	1	6th	4	1	1	—	—
1938	1938	Harold V. Almquist	NCAA	—	ICC	3	4	1	T–8th	1	3	0	—	—
1939	1939	Harold V. Almquist	NCAA	—	ICC	4	4	0	T–7th	2	2	0	—	—
1940	1940	Harold V. Almquist	NCAA	—	ICC	4	2	2	T–2nd	4	1	1	—	—
1941	1941	John Briley	NCAA	—	ICC	2	6	0	7th	1	4	0	—	—
1942	1942	John Briley	NCAA	—	ICC	7	1	0	2nd	4	1	0	—	—
No team from 1943 to 1944
1945	1945	Lee. C Brissman	NCAA	—	ICC	1	3	0					—	—
1946	1946	John Briley	NCAA	—	CCI	3	5	0	5th	2	2	0	—	—
1947	1947	Butch Stolfa	NCAA	—	CCI	4	2	2	3rd	3	1	1	—	—
1948	1948	Butch Stolfa	NCAA	—	CCI	4	3	1	5th	2	3	0	—	—
1949	1949	Butch Stolfa	NCAA	—	CCI	6	2	0	1st	5	0	0	Conference champions	—
1950	1950	Ollie Olson	NCAA	—	CCI	2	6	0	6th	1	4	0	—	—
1951	1951	Vincent Lundeen	NCAA	—	CCI	3	4	1	6th	2	3	0	—	—
1952	1952	Vincent Lundeen	NCAA	—	CCI	3	5	0	4th	3	2	0	—	—
1953	1953	Vincent Lundeen	NCAA	—	CCI	5	4	0	3rd	3	2	0	—	—
1954	1954	Vincent Lundeen	NCAA	—	CCI	3	5	0	5th	2	4	0	—	—
1955	1955	Vincent Lundeen	NCAA	—	CCI	2	6	0	5th	2	4	0	—	—
1956	1956	Vincent Lundeen	NCAA	College Division	CCI	1	7	0	6th	1	6	0	—	—
1957	1957	Vincent Lundeen	NCAA	College Division	CCI	4	4	0	5th	3	4	0	—	—
1958	1958	Vincent Lundeen	NCAA	College Division	CCI	2	6	0	7th	1	6	0	—	—
1959	1959	Ray B. Leoschner	NCAA	College Division	CCI	5	3	0	4th	4	3	0	—	—
1960	1960	Ray B. Leoschner	NCAA	College Division	CCI	3	4	2	5th	1	3	1	—	—
1961	1961	Ray B. Leoschner	NCAA	College Division	CCI	5	4	0	5th	2	4	0	—	—
1962	1962	Ray B. Leoschner	NCAA	College Division	CCI	5	4	0	3rd	4	3	0	—	—
1963	1963	Ray B. Leoschner	NCAA	College Division	CCI	7	2	0	2nd	4	2	0	—	—
1964	1964	Ralph Starenko	NCAA	College Division	CCI	7	1	0	2nd	5	1	0	—	—
1965	1965	Ralph Starenko	NCAA	College Division	CCI	4	2	2	4th	2	2	2	—	—
1966	1966	Ralph Starenko	NCAA	College Division	CCI	6	2	1	1st	5	1	0	Conference champions	—
1967	1967	Ralph Starenko	NCAA	College Division	CCIW	4	5	0	4th	3	3	0	—	—
1968	1968	Ralph Starenko	NCAA	College Division	CCIW	6	3	0	1st	6	1	0	Conference champions	—
1969	1969	Ben Newcomb	NCAA	College Division	CCIW	7	2	0	2nd	6	1	0	—	—
1970	1970	Ben Newcomb	NCAA	College Division	CCIW	3	6	0	6th	3	5	0	—	—
1971	1971	Ben Newcomb	NCAA	College Division	CCIW	5	4	0	T–2nd	5	3	0	—	—
1972	1972	Ben Newcomb	NCAA	College Division	CCIW	6	3	0	T–3rd	5	3	0	—	—
1973	1973	Ben Newcomb	NCAA	Division III	CCIW	7	2	0	T–2nd	6	2	0	—	—
1974	1974	Ben Newcomb	NCAA	Division III	CCIW	5	3	1	T–4th	4	3	1	—	—
1975	1975	Ben Newcomb	NCAA	Division III	CCIW	7	2	0	1st	6	2	0	Conference champions	—
1976	1976	Ben Newcomb	NCAA	Division III	CCIW	7	2	0	2nd	6	2	0	L NCAA Division III Quarterfinal	—
1977	1977	Ben Newcomb	NCAA	Division III	CCIW	4	5	0	T–4th	4	4	0	—	—
1978	1978	Ben Newcomb	NCAA	Division III	CCIW	4	5	0	6th	3	5	0	—	—
1979	1979	Bob Reade	NCAA	Division III	CCIW	6	3	0	T–4th	5	3	0	—	—
1980	1980	Bob Reade	NCAA	Division III	CCIW	6	3	0	T–3rd	5	3	0	—	—
1981	1981	Bob Reade	NCAA	Division III	CCIW	9	1	0	1st	8	0	0	L NCAA Division III First Round	—
1982	1982	Bob Reade	NCAA	Division III	CCIW	11	1	0	1st	8	0	0	L NCAA Division III Championship	—
1983	1983	Bob Reade	NCAA	Division III	CCIW	12	0	0	1st	8	0	0	W NCAA Division III Championship	—
1984	1984	Bob Reade	NCAA	Division III	CCIW	12	0	0	1st	8	0	0	W NCAA Division III Championship	—
1985	1985	Bob Reade	NCAA	Division III	CCIW	13	0	0	1st	8	0	0	W NCAA Division III Championship	—
1986	1986	Bob Reade	NCAA	Division III	CCIW	12	0	1	1st	7	0	1	W NCAA Division III Championship	—
1987	1987	Bob Reade	NCAA	Division III	CCIW	10	1	0	1st	8	0	0	L NCAA Division III Quarterfinal	—
1988	1988	Bob Reade	NCAA	Division III	CCIW	10	2	0	T–1st	7	1	0	L NCAA Division III Semifinal	—
1989	1989	Bob Reade	NCAA	Division III	CCIW	8	2	0	2nd	7	1	0	L NCAA Division III First Round	—
1990	1990	Bob Reade	NCAA	Division III	CCIW	8	2	0	T–1st	7	1	0	L NCAA Division III First Round	—
1991	1991	Bob Reade	NCAA	Division III	CCIW	8	1	0	1st	7	1	0	Conference champions	—
1992	1992	Bob Reade	NCAA	Division III	CCIW	6	3	0	2nd	6	1	0	—	—
1993	1993	Bob Reade	NCAA	Division III	CCIW	7	2	0	1st	7	0	0	Conference champions	—
1994	1994	Bob Reade	NCAA	Division III	CCIW	8	2	0	T–1st	6	1	0	L NCAA Division III First Round	—
1995	1995	Tom Schmulbach	NCAA	Division III	CCIW	6	3	0	3rd	5	2	0	—	—
1996	1996	Tom Schmulbach	NCAA	Division III	CCIW	5	4	0	T–3rd	4	3	0	—	—
1997	1997	Tom Schmulbach	NCAA	Division III	CCIW	7	2	0	1st	6	1	0	Conference champions	—
1998	1998	Tom Schmulbach	NCAA	Division III	CCIW	7	2	0	T–2nd	5	2	0	—	—
1999	1999	Tom Schmulbach	NCAA	Division III	CCIW	9	2	0	1st	6	1	0	L NCAA Division III Second Round	—
2000	2000	Jim Barnes	NCAA	Division III	CCIW	7	3	0	4th	4	3	0	—	—
2001	2001	Jim Barnes	NCAA	Division III	CCIW	10	2	0	T–1st	6	1	0	L NCAA Division III Second Round	—
2002	2002	Jim Barnes	NCAA	Division III	CCIW	7	2	0	2nd	6	1	0	—	—
2003	2003	Jim Barnes	NCAA	Division III	CCIW	7	3	0	2nd	6	1	0	—	—
2004	2004	Jim Barnes	NCAA	Division III	CCIW	7	3	0	3rd	5	2	0	—	—
2005	2005	Jim Barnes	NCAA	Division III	CCIW	10	2	0	1st	7	0	0	L NCAA Division III Second Round	—
2006	2006	Jim Barnes	NCAA	Division III	CCIW	7	3	0	T–1st	6	1	0	Conference champions	—
2007	2007	Jim Barnes	NCAA	Division III	CCIW	5	5	0	T–5th	3	4	0	—	—
2008	2008	Jim Barnes	NCAA	Division III	CCIW	7	3	0	T–2nd	5	2	0	—	—
2009	2009	Jim Barnes	NCAA	Division III	CCIW	6	4	0	T–3rd	4	3	0	—	—
2010	2010	Jim Barnes	NCAA	Division III	CCIW	6	4	0	T–3rd	4	3	0	—	—
2011	2011	Rob Cushman	NCAA	Division III	CCIW	2	8	0	7th	2	5	0	—	—
2012	2012	Rob Cushman	NCAA	Division III	CCIW	5	5	0	4th	4	3	0	—	—
2013	2013	Rob Cushman	NCAA	Division III	CCIW	5	5	0	4th	3	4	0	—	—
2014	2014	Rob Cushman	NCAA	Division III	CCIW	5	5	0	3rd	4	3	0	—	—
2015	2015	Steve Bell	NCAA	Division III	CCIW	4	6	0	5th	3	4	0	—	—
2016	2016	Steve Bell	NCAA	Division III	CCIW	3	7	0	7th	2	6	0	—	—
2017	2017	Steve Bell	NCAA	Division III	CCIW	1	9	0	T–8th	1	7	0	—	—
2018	2018	Steve Bell	NCAA	Division III	CCIW	4	6	0	7th	3	6	0	—	—
2019	2019	Steve Bell	NCAA	Division III	CCIW	6	4	0	6th	5	4	0	—	—
2020–21	2020	Steve Bell	NCAA	Division III	CCIW	1	2	0	4th	1	2	0	—	—
2021	2021	Steve Bell	NCAA	Division III	CCIW	5	5	0	5th	4	5	0	—	—
2022	2022	Steve Bell	NCAA	Division III	CCIW	5	5	0	6th	4	5	0	—	—
2023	2023	Steve Bell	NCAA	Division III	CCIW	8	3	0	3rd	7	2	0	L Isthmus Bowl	—
2024	2024	Steve Bell	NCAA	Division III	CCIW	4	6	0	T–7th	3	6	0	—	—
2025	2025	Steve Bell	NCAA	Division III	CCIW	7	3	0	4th	6	3	0	—	—
