= 1941 Oklahoma Sooners football team =

American college football season

1941 Oklahoma Sooners football
- Conference: Big Six Conference
- Record: 6–3 (3–2 Big 6)
- Head coach: Dewey Luster (1st season)
- Captains: Roger Eason; Orville Mathews
- Home stadium: Memorial Stadium

1941 Big Six Conference football standings
	Conf.					Overall
Team	W		L		T	W		L		T
No. 7 Missouri $	5	–	0	–	0	8	–	2	–	0
Nebraska	3	–	2	–	0	4	–	5	–	0
Oklahoma	3	–	2	–	0	6	–	3	–	0
Kansas	2	–	3	–	0	3	–	6	–	0
Kansas State	1	–	3	–	1	2	–	5	–	2
Iowa State	0	–	4	–	1	2	–	6	–	1
$ – Conference champion; Rankings from AP Poll

The 1941 Oklahoma Sooners football team represented the University of Oklahoma in the 1941 college football season. In their first year under head coach Dewey Luster, the Sooners compiled a 6–3 record (3–2 against conference opponents), finished in a tie for second place in the Big Six Conference, and outscored their opponents by a combined total of 218 to 95.

No Sooners received All-America honors in 1941, but two Oklahoma players were selected by the United Press as first-team players on the 1941 All-Big Six Conference football team: senior tackle Roger Eason and senior fullback Jack Jacobs. Two others (halfback Orville Mathews and guard Ralph Harris) were named to the second team.

Oklahoma was ranked at No. 20 (out of 681 teams) in the final rankings under the Litkenhous Difference by Score System for 1941.

== Schedule ==
Date	Opponent	Site	Result	Attendance	Source
September 27	Oklahoma A&M*	Memorial Stadium; Norman, OK (Bedlam)	W 19–0	28,000	
October 11	vs. Texas*	Fair Park; Dallas, TX (rivalry)	L 7–40	42,000	
October 18	at Kansas State	Memorial Stadium; Manhattan, KS	W 16–0	6,500	
October 25	No. 8 Santa Clara*	Memorial Stadium; Norman, OK	W 16–6	22,000	
November 1	Kansas	Memorial Stadium; Norman, OK	W 38–0	11,000	
November 8	Iowa State^{†}	Memorial Stadium; Norman, OK	W 55–0	15,000	
November 15	at No. 16 Missouri	Memorial Stadium; Columbia, MO (rivalry)	L 0–28	27,000	
November 22	Marquette*	Memorial Stadium; Norman, OK	W 61–14	8,000	
November 29	at Nebraska	Memorial Stadium; Lincoln, NE (rivalry)	L 6–7	22,000	
*Non-conference game; ^{†}Homecoming; Rankings from AP Poll released prior to the game

== NFL draft ==
The following players were drafted into the National Football League following the season.

Round	Pick	Player	Position	NFL team
2	12	Jack Jacobs	Back	Cleveland Rams
3	17	Roger Eason	Tackle	Cleveland Rams
5	32	Orville Matthews	Back	Cleveland Rams
15	136	Marvin Whited	Back	Washington Redskins
