= 1941 Missouri Tigers football team =

American college football season

1941 Missouri Tigers football

Big 6 champion

Sugar Bowl, L 0–2 vs. Fordham
- Conference: Big Six Conference

Ranking
- AP: No. 7
- Record: 8–2 (5–0 Big 6)
- Head coach: Don Faurot (7th season)
- Home stadium: Memorial Stadium

1941 Big Six Conference football standings
	Conf.					Overall
Team	W		L		T	W		L		T
No. 7 Missouri $	5	–	0	–	0	8	–	2	–	0
Nebraska	3	–	2	–	0	4	–	5	–	0
Oklahoma	3	–	2	–	0	6	–	3	–	0
Kansas	2	–	3	–	0	3	–	6	–	0
Kansas State	1	–	3	–	1	2	–	5	–	2
Iowa State	0	–	4	–	1	2	–	6	–	1
$ – Conference champion; Rankings from AP Poll

The 1941 Missouri Tigers football team was an American football team that represented the University of Missouri in the Big Six Conference (Big 6) during the 1941 college football season. The team compiled an 8–2 record (5–0 against Big 6 opponents), won the Big 6 championship, lost to Fordham in the 1942 Sugar Bowl, outscored all opponents by a combined total of 226 to 39, and was ranked No. 7 in the final AP Poll. Don Faurot was the head coach for the seventh of 19 seasons. The team played its home games at Memorial Stadium in Columbia, Missouri.

The team's leading scorer was junior halfback Bob Steuber with 67 points. Five Missouri players were selected by the United Press as first-team players on the 1941 All-Big Six Conference football team: Steuber; senior quarterback Harry Ice; senior center Darold Jenkins; senior guard Robert Jeffries; and senior tackle Norville Wallach. Three others (quarterback Maurice Wade, end Bert Ekern, and tackle Robert Brenton) were named to the second team.

== Schedule ==
Date	Opponent	Rank	Site	Result	Attendance	Source
September 27	at Ohio State*		Ohio Stadium; Columbus, OH	L 7–12	49,671	
October 4	Colorado*		Memorial Stadium; Columbia, MO	W 21–6	5,000	
October 11	Kansas State		Memorial Stadium; Columbia, MO	W 35–0		
October 18	at Iowa State		Clyde Williams Field; Ames, IA (rivalry)	W 39–13	15,000	
October 25	Nebraska		Memorial Stadium; Columbia, MO (rivalry)	W 6–0	29,000	
November 1	at Michigan State*	No. 19	Macklin Field; East Lansing, MI	W 19–0	15,750	
November 8	at NYU*	No. 17	Yankee Stadium; New York, NY	W 26–0	6,700	
November 15	Oklahoma^{†}	No. 16	Memorial Stadium; Columbia, MO (rivalry)	W 28–0	27,000	
November 22	at Kansas	No. 8	Memorial Stadium; Lawrence, KS (rivalry)	W 45–6	> 14,000	
January 1, 1942	vs. No. 6 Fordham*	No. 7	Tulane Stadium; New Orleans, LA (Sugar Bowl)	L 0–2	73,000	
*Non-conference game; ^{†}Homecoming; Rankings from AP Poll released prior to the game

== Rankings ==
Ranking movements Legend: ██ Increase in ranking ██ Decrease in ranking — = Not ranked ( ) = First-place votes
	Week							
Poll	1	2	3	4	5	6	7	Final
AP	—	—	19	17	16	8	7 (1)	7 (1)
