= 1941 Kansas Jayhawks football team =

American college football season

1941 Kansas Jayhawks football
- Conference: Big Six Conference
- Record: 3–6 (2–3 Big 6)
- Head coach: Gwinn Henry (3rd season)
- Captain: Hub Ulrich
- Home stadium: Memorial Stadium

1941 Big Six Conference football standings
	Conf.					Overall
Team	W		L		T	W		L		T
No. 7 Missouri $	5	–	0	–	0	8	–	2	–	0
Nebraska	3	–	2	–	0	4	–	5	–	0
Oklahoma	3	–	2	–	0	6	–	3	–	0
Kansas	2	–	3	–	0	3	–	6	–	0
Kansas State	1	–	3	–	1	2	–	5	–	2
Iowa State	0	–	4	–	1	2	–	6	–	1
$ – Conference champion; Rankings from AP Poll

The 1941 Kansas Jayhawks football team was an American football team that represented the University of Kansas in the Big Six Conference during the 1941 college football season. In their third season under head coach Gwinn Henry, the Jayhawks compiled a 3–6 record (2–3 against conference opponents), finished in fourth place in the conference, and were outscored by opponents by a combined total of 222 to 74.

The team's statistical leaders included Ray Niblo with 241 rushing yards and 657 passing yards, Ray Evans with 235 receiving yards, and Denzel Gibbens with 18 points scored (three touchdowns). The Jayhawks had two players on the team more well known for accomplishments off the football field, politician Bob Dole and Naismith Memorial Basketball Hall of Fame coach Ralph Miller.

End Hub Ulrich was the team captain; Ulrich was also selected by the United Press as a first-team player on the 1941 All-Big Six Conference football team. Two other Kansas players (quarterback Ralph Miller and end Fred Preston) were named to the second team.

Kansas was ranked at No. 158 (out of 681 teams) in the final rankings under the Litkenhous Difference by Score System for 1941.

The team played its home games at Memorial Stadium in Lawrence, Kansas.

== Schedule ==
Date	Opponent	Site	Result	Attendance	Source
September 26	at Temple*	Temple Stadium; Philadelphia, PA	L 9–31	23,000	
October 4	Washington University*	Memorial Stadium; Lawrence, KS	W 19–6		
October 11	at Nebraska	Memorial Stadium; Lincoln, NE (rivalry)	L 0–32	28,000	
October 18	at Marquette*	Marquette Stadium; Milwaukee, WI	L 7–33	10,000	
October 25	Iowa State	Memorial Stadium; Lawrence, KS	W 13–0	5,000	
November 1	at Oklahoma	Memorial Stadium; Norman, OK	L 0–38	11,000	
November 8	at West Virginia*	Mountaineer Field; Morgantown, WV	L 0–21	9,300	
November 15	Kansas State	Memorial Stadium; Lawrence, KS (Sunflower Showdown)	W 20–16	10,463	
November 22	No. 8 Missouri^{†}	Memorial Stadium; Lawrence, KS (Border War)	L 6–45	14,000	
*Non-conference game; ^{†}Homecoming; Rankings from AP Poll released prior to the game

== After the season ==
=== NFL draft ===
The following Jayhawks were selected in the 1942 NFL draft following the season.

Round	Pick	Player	Position	NFL club
9	72	Hub Ulrich	End	Cleveland Rams
16	147	Ralph Miller	Back	Brooklyn Dodgers
