= 1941 Kansas State Wildcats football team =

American college football season

1941 Kansas State Wildcats football
- Conference: Big Six Conference
- Record: 2–5–2 (1–3–1 Big 6)
- Head coach: Hobbs Adams (2nd season)
- Home stadium: Memorial Stadium

1941 Big Six Conference football standings
	Conf.					Overall
Team	W		L		T	W		L		T
No. 7 Missouri $	5	–	0	–	0	8	–	2	–	0
Nebraska	3	–	2	–	0	4	–	5	–	0
Oklahoma	3	–	2	–	0	6	–	3	–	0
Kansas	2	–	3	–	0	3	–	6	–	0
Kansas State	1	–	3	–	1	2	–	5	–	2
Iowa State	0	–	4	–	1	2	–	6	–	1
$ – Conference champion; Rankings from AP Poll

The 1941 Kansas State Wildcats football team was an American football team that represented Kansas State University as a member of the Big Six Conference during the 1941 college football season. The team's head football coach was Hobbs Adams, in his second and final year of his first tenure at the helm of the Wildcats. The Wildcats compiled a 2–5–2 record (1–3–1 record in conference play), finished fifth in the conference, and were outscored by a total of 168 to 67.

End Frank Barnhart was selected by the United Press as a first-team player on the 1941 All-Big Six Conference football team. Center John Hancock and fullback Lyle Wilkins were named to the second team.

Kansas State was ranked at No. 120 (out of 681 teams) in the final rankings under the Litkenhous Difference by Score System for 1941.

The team played its home games in Memorial Stadium in Manhattan, Kansas.

== Schedule ==
Date	Opponent	Site	Result	Attendance	Source
September 27	Fort Hays*	Memorial Stadium; Manhattan, KS	T 0–0	6,000	
October 4	at Northwestern*	Dyche Stadium; Evanston, IL	L 3–51	40,000	
October 11	at Missouri	Memorial Stadium; Columbia, MO	L 0–35		
October 18	Oklahoma	Memorial Stadium; Manhattan, KS	L 0–16	6,500	
November 1	Nebraska^{†}	Memorial Stadium; Manhattan, KS (rivalry)	W 12–6	7,000	
November 8	South Carolina*	Memorial Stadium; Manhattan, KS	W 3–0	8,000	
November 15	at Kansas	Memorial Stadium; Lawrence, KS (rivalry)	L 16–20	10,463	
November 22	at Iowa State	Clyde Williams Field; Ames, IA (rivalry)	T 12–12	6,000	
November 29	at Arizona*	Arizona Stadium; Tucson, AZ	L 21–28	9,000	
*Non-conference game; ^{†}Homecoming
