= List of Nebraska Cornhuskers in the College Football Hall of Fame =

This list of Nebraska Cornhuskers in the College Football Hall of Fame shows the twenty-one players and seven coaches of the Nebraska Cornhuskers football program who have been inducted into the College Football Hall of Fame. Three Cornhuskers – tackle Ed Weir and head coaches Dana X. Bible and Fielding H. Yost – were members of the Hall's inaugural class in 1951. Inductees Bob Brown, Guy Chamberlin, and Will Shields are also enshrined in the Pro Football Hall of Fame.

Five former Cornhuskers (players Barry Alvarez and Francis Schmidt and coaches Tony Blazine, Pete Elliott, and Gomer Jones) are enshrined for their contributions at other schools and are not claimed by Nebraska as representatives.

== List of inductees ==
=== Players ===
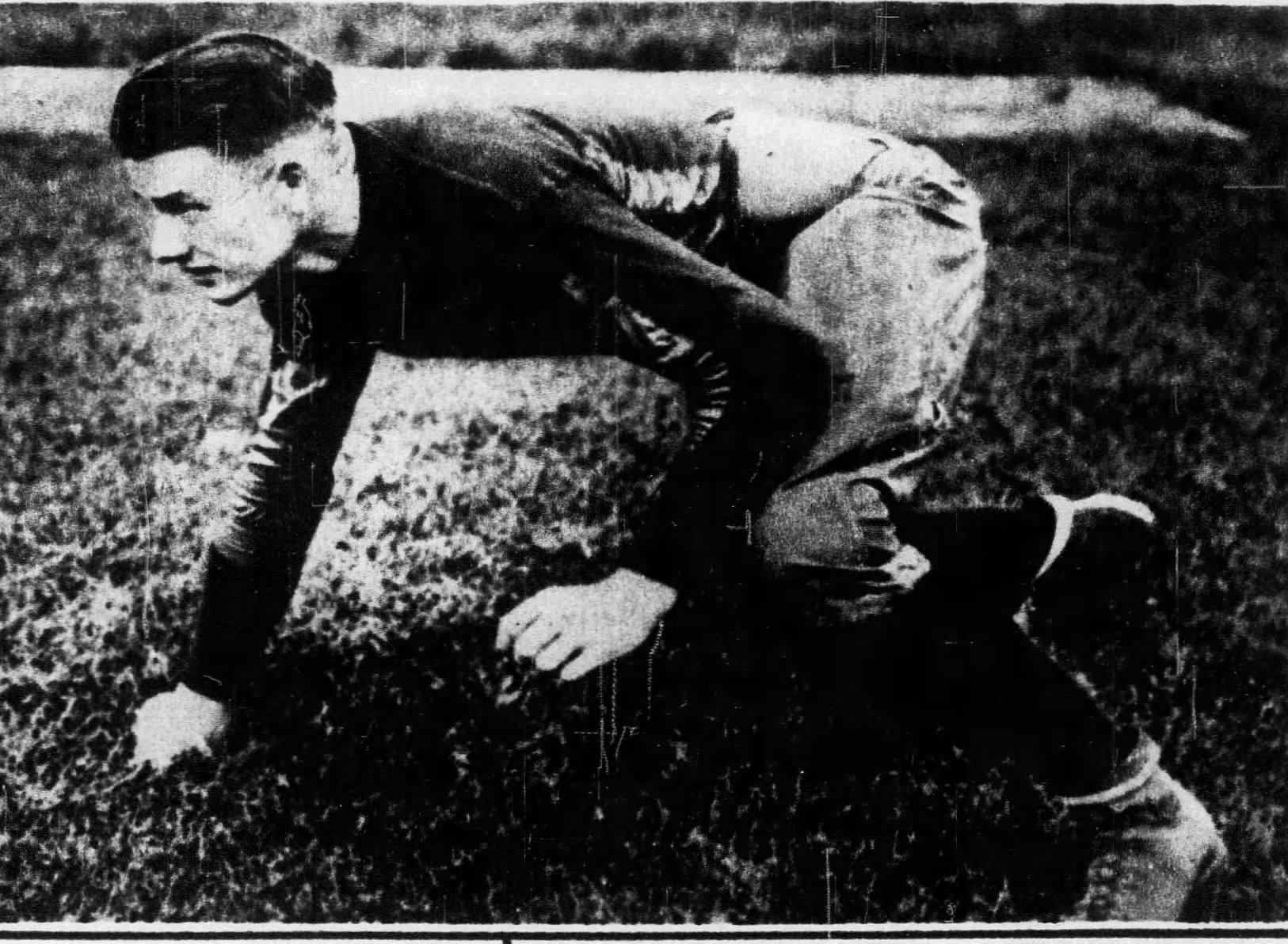
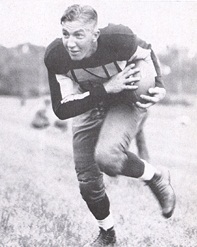
Ed Weir (left) and George Sauer were the first Nebraska players inducted into the College Football Hall of Fame

Player	Position	Career (Note: Only includes years in the role for which the individual was inducted into the College Football Hall of Fame. Several inductees also served at Nebraska in a separate capacity.)	Inducted
Ed Weir	OT	1923–1925	1951
George Sauer	FB	1931–1933	1954
Guy Chamberlin	E	1913–1915	1962
Clarence Swanson	E	1918–1920	1973
Sam Francis	FB	1934–1936	1977
Bobby Reynolds	HB	1950–1952	1984
Forrest Behm	OT	1938–1940	1988
Wayne Meylan	MG	1965–1967	1991
Bob Brown	OT	1961–1963	1993
Rich Glover	MG	1970–1972	1995
Dave Rimington	C	1979–1982	1997
Johnny Rodgers	WB	1970–1972	2000
Mike Rozier	IB	1981–1983	2006
Grant Wistrom	DE	1994–1997	2009
Will Shields	G	1989–1992	2011
Tommie Frazier	QB	1992–1995	2013
Trev Alberts	LB	1990–1993	2015
Aaron Taylor	G	1994–1997	2018
Eric Crouch	QB	1998–2001	2020
Zach Wiegert	OT	1991–1994	2022
Ndamukong Suh	DT	2005–2009	2026

=== Coaches ===
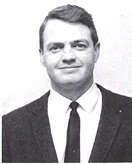
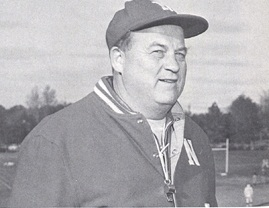
Tom Osborne (left) and Bob Devaney, Nebraska's two winningest head coaches, were each enshrined in the College Football Hall of Fame

Coach	Tenure	Inducted
Dana X. Bible	1926–1936	1951
Fielding H. Yost	1898	1951
Biff Jones	1937–1941	1954
Edward N. Robinson	1896–1897	1955
Bob Devaney	1962–1972	1981
Tom Osborne	1973–1997	1998
Frank Solich	1998–2003	2024
