= Earl Crowder =

American football player (1915–1984)

- Crowder in 1939

No. 13, 40
- Positions: End, Back

Personal information
- Born: January 21, 1915; Cherokee, Oklahoma, U.S.
- Died: February 6, 1984 (aged 69); Cherokee, Oklahoma, U.S.
- Listed height: 6 ft 0 in (1.83 m)
- Listed weight: 198 lb (90 kg)

Career information
- High school: Cherokee
- College: Oklahoma (1935-1938)
- NFL draft: 1939: 10th round, 82nd overall pick

Career history
- Chicago Cardinals (1939); Cleveland Rams (1940)

Awards and highlights
- Second-team All-Big Six (1938)

Career NFL statistics
- Receptions: 4
- Receiving yards: 92
- Stats at Pro Football Reference

Earl Franklin Crowder (January 21, 1915 – February 6, 1984) was an American football player.

A native of Cherokee, Oklahoma, he played college football for Oklahoma. He was a co-captain of the 1938 Oklahoma Sooners football team that was undefeated in the regular season before losing to Tennessee in the 1939 Orange Bowl. Crowder was "recognized as one of the headiest, speediest and hardest hitting backs in the country."

He was selected by the Chicago Cardinals in the 10th round (82nd overall pick) of the 1939 NFL draft. He appeared in nine NFL games.

Crowder and Beryl Clark grew up on neighboring farms, were childhood friends, attended the same primary and high school, played college football for the Oklahoma Sooners, and played professional football for the Chicago Cardinals.

Crowder died from cancer at age 69 in Cherokee.
