= 1941 Iowa State Cyclones football team =

American college football season

1941 Iowa State Cyclones football
- Conference: Big Six Conference
- Record: 2–6–1 (0–4–1 Big 6)
- Head coach: Ray Donels (1st season)
- Captain: LaVerne "Butch" Lewis
- Home stadium: Clyde Williams Field

1941 Big Six Conference football standings
	Conf.					Overall
Team	W		L		T	W		L		T
No. 7 Missouri $	5	–	0	–	0	8	–	2	–	0
Nebraska	3	–	2	–	0	4	–	5	–	0
Oklahoma	3	–	2	–	0	6	–	3	–	0
Kansas	2	–	3	–	0	3	–	6	–	0
Kansas State	1	–	3	–	1	2	–	5	–	2
Iowa State	0	–	4	–	1	2	–	6	–	1
$ – Conference champion; Rankings from AP Poll

The 1941 Iowa State Cyclones football team was an American football team that represented Iowa State College of Agricultural and Mechanic Arts (later renamed Iowa State University) in the Big Six Conference during the 1941 college football season. In their first season under head coach Ray Donels, the Cyclones compiled a 2–6–1 record (0–4–1) against conference opponents), finished in last place in the conference, and were outscored by a total of 173 to 85.

Senior guard LaVerne "Butch" Lewis was the team captain; Lewis was also selected by the United Press as a second-team player on the 1941 All-Big Six Conference football team. No Iowa State player was selected as a first-team all-conference player.

Iowa State was ranked at No. 128 (out of 681 teams) in the final rankings under the Litkenhous Difference by Score System for 1941.

The team played its home games at Clyde Williams Field in Ames, Iowa.

== Schedule ==
Date	Time	Opponent	Site	Result	Attendance	Source
September 26	10:00 p.m.	at Denver*	DU Stadium; Denver, CO	W 7–6	14,137	
October 4	2:00 p.m.	Nebraska	Clyde Williams Field; Ames, IA (rivalry)	L 0–14	12,413	
October 18	2:00 p.m.	Missouri^{†}	Clyde Williams Field; Ames, IA (rivalry)	L 13–39	12,207	
October 25	2:00 p.m.	at Kansas	Memorial Stadium; Lawrence, KS	L 0–13	5,534	
November 1	2:00 p.m.	South Dakota*	Clyde Williams Field; Ames, IA	W 27–0	4,346	
November 8	2:30 p.m.	at Oklahoma	Oklahoma Memorial Stadium; Norman, OK	L 0–55	14,633	
November 15	2:00 p.m.	at Drake*	Drake Stadium; Des Moines, IA	L 13–14	5,282	
November 22	2:00 p.m.	Kansas State	Clyde Williams Field; Ames, IA (rivalry)	T 12–12	4,381	
November 29	1:30 p.m.	at Marquette*	Marquette Stadium; Milwaukee, WI	L 13–20	3,806	
*Non-conference game; ^{†}Homecoming; All times are in Central time
