= Bob Steuber =

American football player (1921–1996)

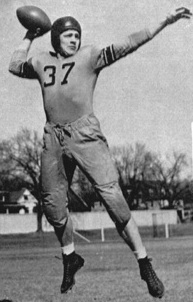
- Steuber in The Savitar, 1943

No. 28, 37, 88, 94, 80
- Position: Halfback

Personal information
- Born: October 25, 1921; Wenonah, New Jersey, U.S.
- Died: November 29, 1996 (aged 75); St. Louis, Missouri, U.S.
- Listed height: 6 ft 2 in (1.88 m)
- Listed weight: 200 lb (91 kg)

Career information
- High school: Christian Brothers College (St. Louis)
- College: Missouri (1940–1943); DePauw (1943)
- NFL draft: 1943: 1st round, 9th overall pick

Career history
- Chicago Bears (1943); Cleveland Browns (1946); Los Angeles Dons (1947); Buffalo Bills (1948)

Awards and highlights
- NFL champion (1943); AAFC champion (1946); First-team All-American (1942); Third-team All-American (1943); 2× First-team All-Big Six (1941, 1942); Second-team All-Big Six (1940); Missouri Tigers No. 37 retired; University of Missouri Athletics Hall of Fame

Career NFL/AAFC statistics
- Rushing yards: 461
- Rushing average: 5.8
- Rushing touchdowns: 3
- Receptions: 3
- Receiving yards: 23
- Stats at Pro Football Reference
- College Football Hall of Fame

Robert James Steuber (October 25, 1921 – November 29, 1996) was an American professional football halfback who played one season in National Football League (NFL) and three seasons in the All-America Football Conference (AAFC). He played college football for the Missouri Tigers, where he quickly became one of the country's most productive runners and scoring threats. He was second in the country in 1942 with more than 1,000 yards of rushing. Steuber was drafted by the NFL's Chicago Bears and played one game for the team, appearing as a substitute on September 26, 1943, in the Green Bay Packers' home opener, which ended in a 21–21 tie. The next day, Steuber entered the United States Navy and was transferred to DePauw University for pre-flight training. Despite having gone from amateur status to professional football, Steuber was allowed to return to college football six days later and led the DePauw Tigers to a 50–0 win over Illinois Normal College, rushing for 225 yards and scoring 25 points in the first half. Playing for DePauw's football team in 1943, he led the nation in scoring.

After the war, Steuber signed with the Cleveland Browns of the AAFC, a new league set to start play in 1946. He was limited by a knee injury that year, however, and was traded to the Los Angeles Dons after the Browns won the first AAFC championship game. Steuber only played in three games for the Dons due to another knee injury, and he was again traded to the Buffalo Bills. A broken back toward the end of the 1948 season ended his playing career for good. Steuber then settled in St. Louis, where he worked as a sports announcer on the weekends. He was elected to the College Football Hall of Fame in 1971 and the University of Missouri's athletics hall of fame in 1990. His number 37 jersey is retired by Missouri.

== Early life and college career ==
Steuber grew up in St. Louis and attended the city's Christian Brothers College High School, where he starred as a halfback on the school's football team. He attended the University of Missouri and played as an end on the Missouri Tigers football team under head coach Don Faurot starting in 1940. In 1941, he shifted to halfback and was assigned to kick extra points. He was third in the country in rushing that year with 855 yards as he and fellow halfback Harry Ice led a Missouri ground attack that ranked first in the nation. Missouri won the Big Six Conference championship and faced Fordham University in the Sugar Bowl at the end of the season. Missouri lost the game, played on a muddy field in New Orleans, by a score of 2–0.

Steuber's success continued in 1942, when he was named an All-American and ranked second in the country in rushing, gaining 1,098 yards. He also was an effective passer, helping Missouri win the Big Six championship for the second year in a row. Steuber was named an All-American after the season. He was also selected to play in the East–West Shrine Game and the College All-Star Game, a now-defunct matchup between the National Football League (NFL) champion and a squad of the best college players from around the country. Steuber scored a touchdown as the college stars defeated the NFL's Washington Redskins.

== Military and professional career ==
Steuber was selected ninth overall in the first round of the NFL draft by the Chicago Bears, but he played in only one game for the team during the 1943 season before departing for the U.S. Navy during World War II. As the Bears went on to win the NFL championship, Steuber entered the Navy's pre-flight training college and was transferred to DePauw University in Greencastle, Indiana, where he played basketball and football for the school's teams. In football, Steuber scored 77 points in his first three games and finished the 1943 season with the highest scoring total in the country. Steuber was again transferred in 1944, ending up at Marquette University in the Navy's V-5 training program. Later the same year, he left for the University of Iowa, where he continued to run track for the Iowa Pre-Flight Seahawks. A controversy arose after an official at the Amateur Athletic Union objected to Steuber's participation in a meet because he had played professionally for the Bears. Steuber, however, was cleared to compete. Steuber also played baseball while at Iowa. At the end of the year, he moved to the Ottumwa Naval Air Station in Iowa and played for its Skyers football team.

Following his discharge from the military at the end of the war, Steuber was expected to rejoin the Bears. He instead was one of the first signings of the Cleveland Browns of the new All-America Football Conference (AAFC) in 1945 while he was stationed in Pensacola, Florida. Fritz Heisler, an assistant with the Browns, had coached Steuber while he was at DePauw and recommended him to Paul Brown, the Cleveland head coach. Steuber saw limited action with the Browns due to a knee injury, but the team posted a 12–2 regular-season record and won the first AAFC championship game. Brown advised Steuber to quit football because of the injury, but Steuber wanted to continue playing, and he was traded to the AAFC's Los Angeles Dons after the season for Frank Yokas, a guard.

Hampered by another injury to his knee, Steuber played in just three games for the Dons in 1947 before being acquired by the Buffalo Bills the following year. In a game against the Dons near the end of the 1948 season, Steuber suffered a broken back that put him in a cast for nine months and ended his football career.

== Later life and death ==
Following his football career, Steuber settled in St. Louis, where he worked as a sports announcer on weekends. He was inducted into the College Football Hall of Fame in 1971. He was inducted into the University of Missouri's athletics hall of fame in 1990. The University of Missouri retired his number 37 jersey. He died in St. Louis in 1996.

== See also ==
- List of NCAA major college football yearly scoring leaders
