= 1941 Nebraska Cornhuskers football team =

American college football season

1941 Nebraska Cornhuskers football
- Conference: Big Six Conference
- Record: 4–5 (3–2 Big 6)
- Head coach: Biff Jones (5th season)
- Offensive scheme: T formation
- Home stadium: Memorial Stadium

1941 Big Six Conference football standings
	Conf.					Overall
Team	W		L		T	W		L		T
No. 7 Missouri $	5	–	0	–	0	8	–	2	–	0
Nebraska	3	–	2	–	0	4	–	5	–	0
Oklahoma	3	–	2	–	0	6	–	3	–	0
Kansas	2	–	3	–	0	3	–	6	–	0
Kansas State	1	–	3	–	1	2	–	5	–	2
Iowa State	0	–	4	–	1	2	–	6	–	1
$ – Conference champion; Rankings from AP Poll

The 1941 Nebraska Cornhuskers football team was an American football team that represented the University of Nebraska in the Big Six Conference during the 1941 college football season. In its fifth season under head coach Biff Jones, the team compiled a 4–5 record (3–2 against conference opponents), tied for second place in the Big Six, and outscored opponents by a total of 93 to 81.

Two Nebraska players were selected by the United Press as first-team players on the 1941 All-Big Six Conference football team: junior halfback Dale Bradley and senior guard George Abel. Senior tackle C. Herndon was named to the second team.

Nebraska was ranked at No. 58 (out of 681 teams) in the final rankings under the Litkenhous Difference by Score System for 1941.

The team played its home games at Memorial Stadium in Lincoln, Nebraska.

== Before the season ==
Nebraska was fresh off its first ever bowl appearance, a well-fought 21–13 loss to Stanford in the 1941 Rose Bowl, and started the 1941 season, the program's 50th year, as defending Big 6 champions, having surpassed 100 conference wins the previous year. The Cornhuskers lost nineteen seniors to graduation, and it was a tall order to hope for a performance to top 1940. Prompted by the stunning success Stanford found by reviving the T formation offense, that was used to defeat the Cornhuskers in the Rose Bowl, coach Jones installed the same formations into the Nebraska offense schemes for 1941.

== Schedule ==
Date	Time	Opponent	Rank	Site	Result	Attendance	Source
October 4	2:00 p.m.	at Iowa State		Clyde Williams Field; Ames, IA (rivalry)	W 14–0	15,000	
October 11	2:00 p.m.	Kansas		Memorial Stadium; Lincoln, NE (rivalry)	W 32–0	28,000	
October 18	2:00 p.m.	Indiana*^{†}	No. 15	Memorial Stadium; Lincoln, NE	L 13–21	33,000	
October 25	2:30 p.m.	at Missouri		Memorial Stadium; Columbia, MO (rivalry)	L 0–6	29,000	
November 1	2:00 p.m.	at Kansas State		Memorial Stadium; Manhattan, KS (rivalry)	L 6–12		
November 8	1:30 p.m.	at No. 2 Minnesota*		Memorial Stadium; Minneapolis, MN (rivalry)	L 0–9	42,893	
November 15	2:00 p.m.	Pittsburgh*		Memorial Stadium; Lincoln, NE	L 7–14	35,000	
November 22	2:00 p.m.	Iowa*		Memorial Stadium; Lincoln, NE (rivalry)	W 14–13	20,000	
November 29	2:00 p.m.	Oklahoma		Memorial Stadium; Lincoln, NE (rivalry)	W 7–6	22,000	
*Non-conference game; ^{†}Homecoming; Rankings from AP Poll released prior to the game; All times are in Central time

== Rankings ==
Ranking movements Legend: ██ Increase in ranking ██ Decrease in ranking — = Not ranked
	Week							
Poll	1	2	3	4	5	6	7	Final
AP	15	—	—	—	—	—	—	—

== Roster ==
Abel, George #47 G Athey, Marvin #41 HB; Bachman, Forrest #11 C Blue, Wayne #39 HB; Bordy, Phil #21 T Bottorff, Don #28 G Bradley, Dale #42 HB; Bryant, William #29 G Byler, Joe #45 T Cooper, Robert #24 QB; DeBus, William Howard #31 HB; Deviney, Robert #40 G Domeier, Dwayne #27 T Duda, Charles #22 G Francis, Vike #38 FB; Gissler, Bert #10 E Hanisch, E.C. #49 G Hanson, Wilmer #13 HB; Hazen, Jack #32 E Herndon, Clarence #34 T Hyde, Robert #51 G Irick, Gene #23 G	Jackson, Dean #46 HB; Kathol, Gerald #12 E Kelly, Howard #56 C Leik, Francis #52 T Long, Roy #33 HB; Ludwick, Robert #30 E Martig, Howard #35 T Meier, Fred #20 C Metheny, Fred #36 QB; Myers, Lynn #48 G Nelson, Jack #55 G Nyden, Ed #16 E Preston, Fred #50 E Prochaska, Jerome #53 E Salisbury, Randall #14 FB; Schleich, Victor #57 T Simmons, Kenneth #19 HB; Sindt, Wayne #15 HB; Thompson, Marvin #44 E VonGoetz, Herbert #58 G Wilkins, Frank #37 G Zikmund, Allen #59 HB

== Coaching staff ==
Name	Title	First year in this position	Years at Nebraska	Alma mater
Lawrence Mcceney "Biff" Jones	Head coach	1937	1937–1941	Army
Roy Lyman		1936	1936–1941	
Charles Armstrong		1937	1937–1942, 1944	
Adolph J. Lewandowski		1937	1937–1944	Nebraska
Paul Amen		1938	1938–1941	
Glenn Presnell		1938	1938–1942, 1946	
Don Waddick	Freshman Coach		1941	
Dale Harvey	Freshman Coach	1941	1941–1942	
Charlie Shubert	Freshman Coach		1941	

== Game summaries ==
=== Iowa State ===
Nebraska at Iowa State

Team	1	2	3	4	Total
• Nebraska	7	0	7	0	14
Iowa State	0	0	0	0	0

- Date: October 4
- Location: Clyde Williams Field • Ames, Iowa
- Game attendance: 12,413
- Game weather: Light rain

A steady but light rain kept the Cornhuskers focused on the ground attack, and Nebraska quickly converted an early first quarter blocked punt into a touchdown. The 7-point lead was doubled in the third quarter to take the game. It was Nebraska's third straight win over the Cyclones, and their 30th win over Iowa State overall, as the series moved to 30–5–1.

=== Kansas ===
Kansas at Nebraska

Team	1	2	Total
Kansas			0
• Nebraska			32

- Date: October 11
- Location: Memorial Stadium • Lincoln, Nebraska

Kansas was unable to put up much of a fight as the Cornhuskers romped over the Jayhawks in Lincoln. The 20–0 lead by halftime reflected the tone of the day as Nebraska sent Kansas home with no points and winless against the Huskers in their last 25 tries. When the AP Poll came out after the game, Nebraska appeared at #15.

=== Indiana ===
Indiana at #15 Nebraska

Team	1	2	Total
• Indiana			21
#15 Nebraska			13

- Date: October 18
- Location: Memorial Stadium • Lincoln, Nebraska

The Cornhuskers posted the first points of the day to set up what many expected would be another win against the Hoosiers, but Indiana had other plans. The visiting team subsequently racked up 21 unanswered points on a surprised Nebraska squad. Finally in the fourth quarter the Cornhuskers responded with a touchdown, but it was not enough to keep the Hoosiers from finally putting a win in their series against Nebraska on their sixth attempt. The surprise loss caused Nebraska to fall out of the AP Poll, and they would not be seen ranked again until 1950.

=== Missouri ===
Nebraska at Missouri

Team	1	2	Total
Nebraska			0
• Missouri			6

- Date: October 25
- Location: Faurot Field • Columbia, Missouri
- Game attendance: 28,000

In front of a record crowd at Faurot Field, Nebraska advanced to the Missouri 11-yard line in the first quarter before being turned away. Another serious threat to the Tigers was repelled early in the second half, and the Huskers were unable to give much of a real scare afterward. Missouri's one touchdown handed them the win, marked the 100th Cornhusker loss in program history, and returned the Missouri-Nebraska Bell to the Tigers. It was the first time Nebraska had been shut out since a 0–19 loss to Pittsburgh in 1938, but the Cornhuskers still held the series at 23–9–3. Missouri would go on to finish the season ranked #7 by the AP Poll, and played Fordham in the 1942 Sugar Bowl.

=== Kansas State ===
Nebraska at Kansas State

Team	1	2	3	4	Total
Nebraska	6	0	0	0	6
• Kansas State	0	12	0	0	12

- Date: November 1
- Location: Memorial Stadium • Manhattan, Kansas

Stunned by the first back-to-back losses since 1938, the Cornhuskers managed just a single first-quarter touchdown against the Wildcats before going flat and allowing two answering scores before the halftime break. Although Nebraska was able to keep Kansas State off the board in the second half, with no points of their own they were unable to prevent the Wildcats from snapping their five-game losing streak against the Cornhuskers. It was just the third win that Kansas State had taken from all 26 tries in the series, and just the 10th loss Nebraska had ever experienced in conference play.

=== Minnesota ===
Nebraska at #2 Minnesota

Team	1	2	Total
Nebraska			0
• #2 Minnesota			9

- Date: November 8
- Location: Memorial Stadium • Minneapolis

The university's yearbook praised the Cornhusker squad for inspired play and described the team for reaching "glorious heights", but the result of their efforts was not enough to prevent the powerhouse Minnesota Golden Gophers from shutting them completely out. This was the fourth loss in a row for Nebraska, a new record for consecutive losses in a season, breaking the three-loss mark set in 1899. Minnesota improved their commanding series lead to 17–4–2, and went on to finish the year ranked #1 in the AP Poll.

=== Pittsburgh ===
Pittsburgh at Nebraska

Team	1	2	3	4	Total
• Pittsburgh	0	7	0	7	14
Nebraska	0	7	0	0	7

- Date: November 15
- Location: Memorial Stadium • Lincoln, Nebraska

Reeling from four straight losses, the Cornhuskers summoned their resolve to halt the skid against the ever-powerful Pittsburgh Panthers. Nebraska scored first in their bid, but the Panthers responded soon after. Carrying the tie through much of the rest of the game, Pittsburgh managed to snag an interception in the last minute of play, returning it for the go-ahead touchdown. As Nebraska scrambled to recover with time running out, the Panthers intercepted yet again and returned the ball to Nebraska's 3-yard line before time expired. The brief two-win streak that Nebraska had enjoyed over Pittsburgh was broken as the Panthers took away their tenth win against Nebraska in sixteen tries. More importantly, however, they handed Nebraska the new dubious record of five consecutive losses for the first time in the history of the Cornhusker football program.

=== Iowa ===
Iowa at Nebraska

Team	1	2	Total
Iowa			13
• Nebraska			14

- Date: November 22
- Location: Memorial Stadium • Lincoln, Nebraska
- Game weather: Rain/snow mix

Iowa rolled out to a 13–0 lead and it looked like a repeat of the past handful of games where Nebraska was bound to go flat and give up the game, but somehow the Cornhusker squad dug down and found the resolve to fight back. Finally, in the fourth quarter, Nebraska punched in the tying score, and then followed it with a successful place kick to go up by one and snap their losing streak at five. It was Nebraska's 8th straight win over Iowa, and 20th win over the Hawkeyes overall, as they improved to 20–7–3 over Iowa to date.

=== Oklahoma ===
Oklahoma at Nebraska

Team	1	2	3	4	Total
Oklahoma	6	0	0	0	6
• Nebraska	0	7	0	0	7

- Date: November 29
- Location: Memorial Stadium • Lincoln, Nebraska

Encouraged by the win over Iowa the previous week, Nebraska took the home field for the last game of the season hoping to close out 1941 with a win. Oklahoma found the scoreboard very early on, but just before the halftime break the Cornhuskers picked off a Sooner pass and returned it for a score. The kick after was good and put the Huskers up by a point. The teams battled back and forth for the rest of the game, but the one-point lead was enough to carry the win. Nebraska marked their third straight defeat of Oklahoma and improved to 15–3–3 over the Sooners all time.

== After the season ==
Although the two wins to close the season provided some relief, it was not enough to overcome the meaning of the program's first ever five-game losing streak. The dark mood over the nation brought by the expansion of World War II was soon made manifest when Japan carried out the attack on Pearl Harbor just a week after the end of the season. Shortly afterward, coach Jones was recalled to active military duty and was forced to step down as head coach. In his five years at Nebraska, he compiled a Big 6 record of 17–6–2 (.720) and an overall program record of 28–14–4, moving Nebraska to 298–103–31 all-time with an overall conference record of 104–17–11. The effects of the war would soon be felt by the football program in other ways, as many thousands of young men immediately started volunteering for duty overseas to help the war effort, many of them from the pool of college football players.
