= Jim Thomas (offensive lineman) =

American football player (1917–1981)

- Thomas in 1938

No. 41
- Position: Guard

Personal information
- Born: May 6, 1917; Oilton, Oklahoma, U.S.
- Died: June 1, 1981 (aged 64); Florence, South Carolina, U.S.
- Listed height: 5 ft 11 in (1.80 m)
- Listed weight: 200 lb (91 kg)

Career information
- High school: Oilton
- College: Oklahoma (1935-1938)
- NFL draft: 1939: 12th round, 102nd overall pick

Career history
- Chicago Cardinals (1939–1940)

Awards and highlights
- Second-team All-Big Six (1938)

Career NFL statistics
- Games played: 13
- Games started: 1
- Stats at Pro Football Reference

James F. Thomas (May 6, 1917 – June 4, 1981) was an American professional football guard.

Thomas was born in 1917 at Oilton, Oklahoma. He attended Oilton High School.

Thomas attended the University of Oklahoma and played for the Oklahoma Sooners football team from 1935 to 1938. He was a member of the 1938 Oklahoma Sooners football team that compiled a 10–1 record and was ranked No. 4 in the final Associated Press poll. He was known as "Singer" Thomas at Oklahoma because of his constant singing in the shower room.

He was drafted by the Chicago Cardinals with the 102nd pick in the 1939 NFL draft. He appeared in 13 games for the Cardinals during the 1939 and 1940 seasons.

Thomas was also an opera singer who sang with the Metropolitan Opera for a year. He served in the Army during World War II, attaining the rank of lieutenant and serving in the field artillery under General George Patton. He was a school teacher in Florence, South Carolina, starting in 1966. He died of an apparent heart attack in 1981 in Florence.
