= John Shirk =

American football player (1917–1993)

No. 63
- Positions: End, defensive end

Personal information
- Born: June 24, 1917; Oklahoma City, Oklahoma, U.S.
- Died: November 8, 1993 (aged 76); Glendora, California, U.S.
- Listed height: 6 ft 4 in (1.93 m)
- Listed weight: 200 lb (91 kg)

Career information
- High school: Central (Oklahoma City)
- College: Oklahoma (1936-1939)
- NFL draft: 1940: 4th round, 26th overall pick

Career history
- Chicago Cardinals (1940)

Awards and highlights
- Pro Bowl (1940); Third-team All-American (1938); Second-team All-Big Six (1938)

Career NFL statistics
- Receptions: 11
- Receiving yards: 91
- Interceptions: 1
- Stats at Pro Football Reference

John Francis Shirk (June 24, 1917 – November 11, 1993) was an American professional football player who was an end and defensive end in the National Football League (NFL). He played college football for the Oklahoma Sooners and was selected 26th overall in the fourth round of the 1940 NFL draft. He played one season for the Chicago Cardinals. During World War II, he served as a captain in the field artillery. During the invasion of Salerno, he was captured and held in the German prisoner of war camp Oflag 64 in Poland.
