= Missouri Tigers football =

American college football program

2026 Missouri Tigers football team
- First season: 1890; 136 years ago
- Athletic director: Laird Veatch
- Head coach: Eliah Drinkwitz; 7th season, 51–30 (.630)
- Location: Columbia, Missouri
- Stadium: Memorial Stadium (capacity: 65,000)
- Field: Faurot Field
- NCAA division: Division I FBS
- Conference: SEC
- Colors: Black and gold
- All-time record: 732–597–52 (.549)
- Bowl record: 17–21 (.447)

National championships
- Claimed: 1960
- Unclaimed: 2007

Conference championships
- WIUFA: 1893, 1894, 1895 MVIAA: 1909, 1913, 1919, 1924, 1925, 1927 Big Eight: 1939, 1941, 1942, 1945, 1960, 1969

Division championships
- Big 12 North: 2007, 2008, 2010 SEC East: 2013, 2014
- Consensus All-Americans: 16
- Rivalries: Arkansas (rivalry); Illinois (rivalry); Iowa State (rivalry); Kansas (rivalry); Kansas State (rivalry); Nebraska (rivalry); Oklahoma (rivalry); South Carolina (rivalry)

Uniforms
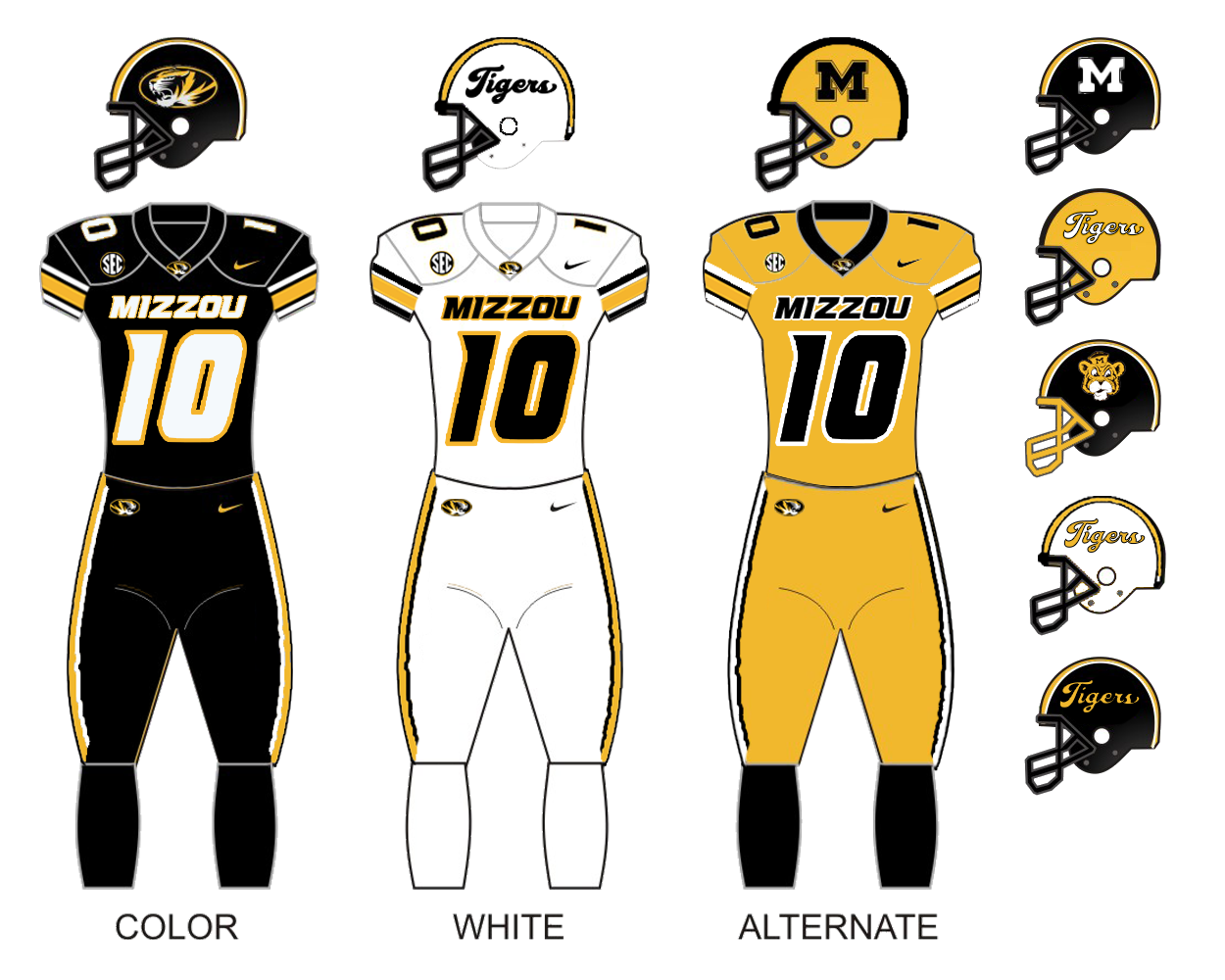
- Fight song: Every True Son, Fight Tiger
- Mascot: Truman the Tiger
- Marching band: Marching Mizzou
- Outfitter: Nike
- Website: mutigers.com

The Missouri Tigers football program represents the University of Missouri (often referred to as Mizzou) in college football. The Tigers are members of Southeastern Conference (SEC) of the Football Bowl Subdivision (FBS) part of the National Collegiate Athletic Association (NCAA).

== History ==
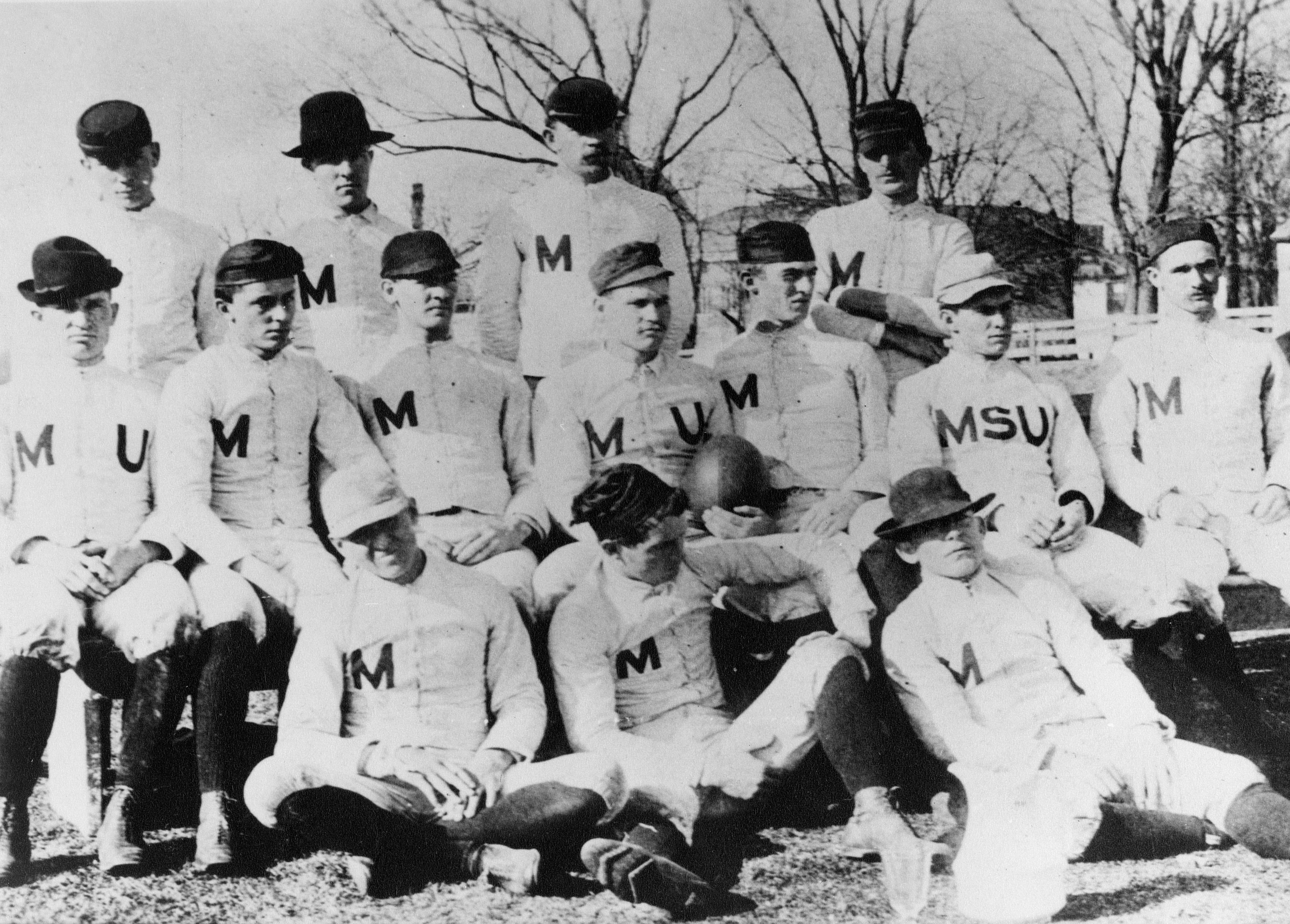
1890 Missouri Tigers football team

Missouri's football program dates back to 1890, and has appeared in 37 bowl games (including 11 major bowl appearances: four Orange Bowls, four Cotton Bowls, two Sugar Bowls, and one Fiesta Bowl). Missouri has won 15 conference titles and 5 division titles. Entering the 2025 season, Missouri's all-time record is 721–593–52 (.547).

Missouri has been a member of the Southeastern Conference (SEC) since 2012. Home games are played on Faurot Field at Memorial Stadium, in Columbia, Missouri, named for hall of fame coach Don Faurot. The student section originally became known as "The Zou", a nickname that has since been applied to the entirety of the Memorial Stadium environment.

Gary Pinkel, a Hall of Fame coach who led Missouri from 2001 to 2015, is the winningest coach in Missouri football history. He earned his 102nd victory in the AT&T Cotton Bowl on Jan. 3, 2014, setting the school record, and finished his tenure with a 118-73 record and a .618 winning percentage.

Barry Odom became Missouri’s coach in 2016 after Gary Pinkel retired. He was fired after the 2019 season, compiling a 25-25 overall record and a 13-19 mark in SEC play over four seasons.

Eliah Drinkwitz took over in 2020 and led Missouri to back-to-back 10-win seasons and top-25 finishes in both 2023 and 2024.

=== Conference affiliations ===
Missouri joined the Southeastern Conference in 2012.

- Independent (1890–1892)
- Western Interstate University Football Association (1893–1897)
- Independent (1898–1906)
- Big Eight Conference (1907–1995)
  - Missouri Valley 1907–1927, unofficially called Big Six 1928–1947, Big Seven 1947–1957 and Big Eight 1957–1964
- Big 12 Conference (1996–2011)
- Southeastern Conference (2012–present)

== Championships ==
The Missouri Tigers have one claimed national championship, one unclaimed national championship, 15 conference championships, and five conference division titles.

=== National championships ===
Although Missouri has never been selected as a "Consensus National Champion" by any of the six NCAA-designated polls, the Tigers were selected as national champions by one major selector in both 1960 and 2007. On August 6, 2026, the United States Senate passed a resolution recognizing the 1960 Missouri Tigers for their undefeated regular season, Orange Bowl victory, and claim to the 1960 national championship. Mizzou Athletics subsequently announced that it would honor the 1960 team as national champions, citing the Poling System's selection of Missouri as the 1960 national champion and noting that the Senate resolution had brought renewed attention to the team.

Season	Coach	Selectors	Record	Final AP	Final Coaches
1960	Dan Devine	Poling System	11–0†	No. 5	No. 4
2007	Gary Pinkel	Anderson & Hester	12–2	No. 4	No. 5

† The Tigers' original 1960 record was 10–1 but was later changed to 11–0 after the Big Eight retroactively awarded a forfeit victory to Missouri.

=== Conference championships ===
Missouri has won 15 conference championships.

Year	Conference	Coach	Overall Record	Conference Record
1893†	WIUFA	H.O. Robinson	4–3	2–1
1894†	WIUFA	H.O. Robinson	4–3	2–1
1895†	WIUFA	C.D. Bliss	7–1	2–1
1909	Big Eight	William Roper	7–0–1	4–0–1
1913	Big Eight	Chester Brewer	7–1	4–0
1919	Big Eight	John F. Miller	5–1–2	4–0–1
1924	Big Eight	Gwinn Henry	7–2	5–1
1925	Big Eight	Gwinn Henry	6–1–1	5–1
1927	Big Eight	Gwinn Henry	7–2	5–1
1939	Big Eight	Don Faurot	8–2	5–0
1941	Big Eight	Don Faurot	8–2	5–0
1942	Big Eight	Don Faurot	8–3–1	4–0–1
1945	Big Eight	Chauncey Simpson	6–4	5–0
1960‡	Big Eight	Dan Devine	11–0	7–0
1969†	Big Eight	Dan Devine	9–2	6–1

† Co-champions
‡ The 1960 Big Eight title was retroactively awarded after a loss to Kansas was reversed due to Kansas' use of a player who was later ruled to be ineligible.

=== Division championships ===
The Tigers were previously members of the Big 12 North division between its inception in 1996 and the dissolution of conference divisions within the Big 12 in 2011. The Tigers joined the SEC as members of the SEC East starting in 2012. Missouri has won five division championships.

Season	Division	Coach	Opponent	CG Result
2007†	Big 12 North	Gary Pinkel	Oklahoma	L 17–38
2008†	Big 12 North	Gary Pinkel	Oklahoma	L 21–62
2010†	Big 12 North	Gary Pinkel	N/A lost tiebreaker to Nebraska	
2013	SEC East	Gary Pinkel	Auburn	L 42–59
2014	SEC East	Gary Pinkel	Alabama	L 13–42

† Co-champion

== Bowl games ==
Missouri has appeared in 39 bowl games, including 11 New Year's Six bowl appearances: 4 Orange Bowls, 4 Cotton Bowls, 2 Sugar Bowls, and 1 Fiesta Bowl, with an all-time bowl record of 17–22. The team also accepted a bid to the 2020 Music City Bowl against Iowa, which was subsequently canceled due to COVID-19.

Missouri's entire bowl history is shown in the table below.

Season	Coach	Bowl	Opponent	Result
1924	Gwinn Henry	Los Angeles Christmas Festival	USC	L 7–20
1939	Don Faurot	Orange Bowl	Georgia Tech	L 7–21
1941	Don Faurot	Sugar Bowl	Fordham	L 0–2
1945	Chauncey Simpson	Cotton Bowl Classic	Texas	L 27–40
1948	Don Faurot	Gator Bowl	Clemson	L 23–24
1949	Don Faurot	Gator Bowl	Maryland	L 7–20
1959	Dan Devine	Orange Bowl	Georgia	L 0–14
1960	Dan Devine	Orange Bowl	Navy	W 21–14
1962	Dan Devine	Bluebonnet Bowl	Georgia Tech	W 14–10
1965	Dan Devine	Sugar Bowl	Florida	W 20–18
1968	Dan Devine	Gator Bowl	Alabama	W 35–10
1969	Dan Devine	Orange Bowl	Penn State	L 3–10
1972	Al Onofrio	Fiesta Bowl	Arizona State	L 35–49
1973	Al Onofrio	Sun Bowl	Auburn	W 34–17
1978	Warren Powers	Liberty Bowl	LSU	W 20–15
1979	Warren Powers	Hall of Fame Classic	South Carolina	W 24–14
1980	Warren Powers	Liberty Bowl	Purdue	L 25–28
1981	Warren Powers	Tangerine Bowl	Southern Miss	W 19–17
1983	Warren Powers	Holiday Bowl	BYU	L 17–21
1997	Larry Smith	Holiday Bowl	Colorado State	L 24–35
1998	Larry Smith	Insight.com Bowl	West Virginia	W 34–31
2003	Gary Pinkel	Independence Bowl	Arkansas	L 14–27
2005	Gary Pinkel	Independence Bowl	South Carolina	W 38–31
2006	Gary Pinkel	Sun Bowl	Oregon State	L 38–39
2007	Gary Pinkel	Cotton Bowl Classic	Arkansas	W 38–7
2008	Gary Pinkel	Alamo Bowl	Northwestern	W 30–23^{OT}
2009	Gary Pinkel	Texas Bowl	Navy	L 13–35
2010	Gary Pinkel	Insight Bowl	Iowa	L 24–27
2011	Gary Pinkel	Independence Bowl	North Carolina	W 41–24
2013	Gary Pinkel	Cotton Bowl Classic	Oklahoma State	W 41–31
2014	Gary Pinkel	Citrus Bowl	Minnesota	W 33–17
2017	Barry Odom	Texas Bowl	Texas	L 16–33
2018	Barry Odom	Liberty Bowl	Oklahoma State	L 33–38
2020	Eli Drinkwitz	Music City Bowl	Iowa	No Contest
2021	Eli Drinkwitz	Armed Forces Bowl	Army	L 22–24
2022	Eli Drinkwitz	Gasparilla Bowl	Wake Forest	L 17–27
2023	Eli Drinkwitz	Cotton Bowl Classic	Ohio State	W 14–3
2024	Eli Drinkwitz	Music City Bowl	Iowa	W 27–24
2025	Eli Drinkwitz	Gator Bowl	Virginia	L 7–13

== Rivalries ==
=== Currently active ===
==== Kansas ====
Missouri leads the series with Kansas 59-54–9 through the 2026 season. With history dating back to Bleeding Kansas in the 1850s, the "Border War" rivalry is well known as one of the longest-lasting and fiercest rivalries in college sports. The teams met annually, traditionally for the final game of the regular season, from 1891 through 2011 when Missouri left the Big 12 for the SEC. The series was contested again in 2025 at Farout Field in Columbia, Missouri, where Missouri won 42-31.

==== Arkansas ====
Missouri and Arkansas first met in 1906 in Columbia, Missouri, and played each other five times prior to Missouri joining the SEC in 2012, and then becoming Arkansas' permanent cross-division rival in 2014. The annual meeting was dubbed the Battle Line Rivalry. On November 23, 2015, a new rivalry trophy was unveiled for the annual game. Missouri leads the series 14–4 as of the conclusion of the 2026 season, which saw the Tigers beat Arkansas 34-10 in Fayetville.

==== Oklahoma ====
Oklahoma leads the series 67–25–5 through the 2024 season. From 1940 through 1974, the teams played for the Tiger-Sooner Peace Pipe trophy. The rivalry was renewed in 2024, as the teams are members of the same conference again. Missouri won the 2024 matchup 30–23.

==== South Carolina ====
A new rivalry was started in 2012 when Missouri joined the SEC East. With both schools located in cities named Columbia (Columbia, Missouri, and Columbia, South Carolina), the mayors of the cities commemorate the winner with the "Mayor's Cup" trophy for the annual game. Missouri leads the series 10–6 as of the conclusion of the 2025 edition of the rivalry.

=== Historic ===
==== Illinois ====
The rivalry between Missouri and Illinois is modeled after the two schools' longstanding basketball rivalry, and it garners the most interest around St. Louis, with both schools having alumni and fans in the area. It has not been played annually, with 24 matchups occurring from 1896 to 2010, with Missouri leading the series 17–7. Between 2000 and 2010, the schools met in St. Louis six times, with Missouri winning each time. The series was set to be renewed for a four-year period, to be played on campus sites, in 2026, before being pushed to resume in 2027.

==== Iowa State ====
Missouri and Iowa State first met in 1896 and the regional rivalry was born. Before the 1959 match-up between the two schools, which took place in Ames, Iowa, field testing showed that the telephones the two schools used to communicate with their coaches in the coaches' box were wired so that either school could hear what was happening on the other sideline. The problem was fixed before the game, but neither of the two coaches knew that. Northwestern Bell Telephone Company of Ames then decided to have a trophy made to commemorate the incident, thus the Telephone Trophy was born. When Missouri left the Big 12 for the SEC, the rivalry was essentially ended. Missouri leads the series with Iowa State 61–34–9 through the 2022 season.

==== Kansas State ====
Separated by 245 miles, these bordering state rivals have played 99 times dating back to their first meeting in 1909. The schools were members of the old Big Eight Conference from 1928 to 1995 and the modern Big 12 Conference from 1996 to 2011. After Missouri left the Big 12 to join the Southeastern Conference in 2012, the annual rivalry went on hiatus. However, on November 16, 2017, the teams agreed to a home-and home series in 2022 and 2023. As of January 2025, Missouri leads the all time series 61-33-5.

==== Nebraska ====
Nebraska leads the series 65–36–3 through the 2022 season. From 1892 through 2010, the teams played for the Victory Bell trophy.

== Individual honors ==
=== All-Americans ===
Missouri has produced 16 Consensus All Americans with 15 total individuals being recognized. Jeremy Maclin won the honor in two different seasons. Missouri also has two unanimous All Americans.

- Darold Jenkins, C 1941
- Danny LaRose,† DE 1960
- Johnny Roland, DB 1965
- Roger Wehrli, DB 1968
- Kellen Winslow, TE 1978
- John Clay, OT 1986
- Rob Riti, C 1999
- Martin Rucker, TE 2007
- Jeremy Maclin, AP 2007
- Jeremy Maclin (2), AP/KR 2008
- Chase Coffman, TE 2008
- Michael Egnew, TE 2010
- Michael Sam,† DE 2013
- Shane Ray, DE 2014
- Cody Schrader, RB 2023
- Ahmad Hardy, RB 2025

† Unanimous selection

=== Award winners ===
- Amos Alonzo Stagg Award – For Contributions to Football

Don Faurot – 1964

- Walter Camp Coach of the Year Award

Warren Powers – 1978

- John Mackey Award – Best Tight End

Chase Coffman – 2008

- Burlsworth Trophy – Best Former Walk-On Player

Cody Schrader — 2023

=== Retired numbers ===
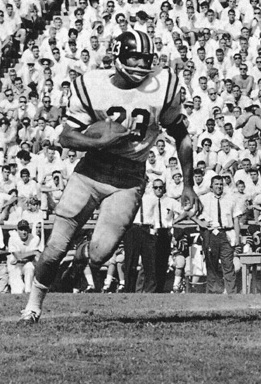
Johnny Roland

Missouri has retired six jersey numbers representing seven players as of 2017.

Missouri Tigers retired numbers
No.	Player	Pos.	Tenure	Ref.
23	Johnny Roland	HB	1962, 1964–1965	
23	Roger Wehrli	CB	1966–1968	
27	Brock Olivo	RB	1994–1997	
37	Bob Steuber	E/HB	1940–1943	
42	Darold Jenkins	C	1939–1941	
44	Paul Christman	QB	1938–1940	
83	Kellen Winslow	TE	1975–1978	

=== Hall of Fame inductees ===
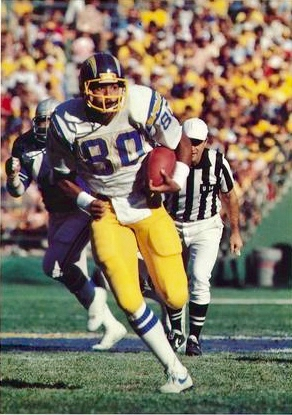
Kellen Winslow

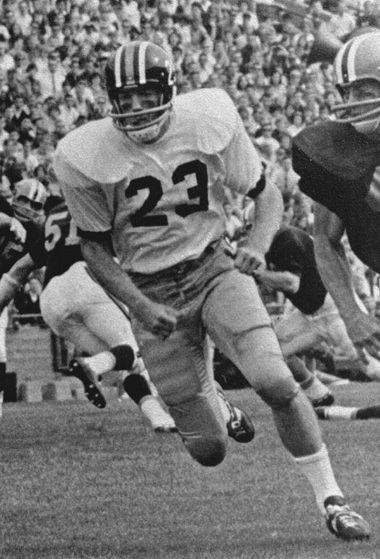
Roger Wehrli

==== College Football Hall of Fame ====
Missouri has 11 inductees into the College Football Hall of Fame.

Player	Position	Induction
Paul Christman	QB	1956
Don Faurot	Coach	1961
Bob Steuber	HB	1971
Ed Travis	T	1974
Darold Jenkins	C	1976
Dan Devine	Coach	1985
Johnny Roland	HB	1998
Kellen Winslow	TE	2002
Roger Wehrli	CB	2003
Gary Pinkel	Coach	2022
Jeremy Maclin	WR	2023

In addition, Bill Roper, Jim Phelan, Frank Broyles, and Lloyd Carr are all inductees who spent brief time at Missouri.

==== Pro Football Hall of Fame ====
Two Missouri players have been enshrined in the Pro Football Hall of Fame:

Player	Position	Induction
Kellen Winslow	TE	1995
Roger Wehrli	CB	2007

== Mascot ==
Truman the Tiger was introduced as the school's mascot against the Utah State Aggies in 1986, receiving his name from former president Harry S. Truman. Truman competes annually in the NCA College National Championship Mascot Division which typically includes a consistent field of around 15 participating mascots; Truman has won the competition several times, most recently in 2024.

== Homecoming ==
See 1911 Kansas vs. Missouri football game

The NCAA as well as Jeopardy! and Trivial Pursuit recognize the University of Missouri as the birthplace of Homecoming, an event which became a national tradition in college football. The history of the University of Missouri Homecoming can be traced back to the 1911 Kansas vs. Missouri football game, when the Missouri Tigers faced off against the Kansas Jayhawks in the first installment of the Border War rivalry series.

== Future opponents ==
=== Conference opponents ===
From 2012 to 2023, Missouri played in the East Division of the SEC and played each opponent in the division each year along with several teams from the West Division. The SEC will expand the conference to 16 teams and will eliminate its two divisions in 2024, causing a new scheduling format for the Tigers to play against the other members of the conference. On March 20, 2024, the SEC announced that they would continue with 8 conference games for the 2025 season, and that each team would play their same conference opponents from the 2024 schedule, only with the host locations switched. In August 2025, the conference announced that they would move to 9 conference games for schedules from 2026-2029.

==== 2026 Conference Schedule ====
Opponent	Site	Result
at Arkansas	Donald W. Reynolds Razorback Stadium; Fayetteville, AR (Battle Line Rivalry)	W 34–10
No. 8 Florida	Faurot Field; Columbia, MO	W 45–17
at No. 1 Georgia	Sanford Stadium; Athens, GA	L 21–48
Kentucky	Faurot Field; Columbia, MO	
at No. 24 Mississippi State	Davis Wade Stadium; Starkville, MS	L 24–31
Oklahoma	Faurot Field; Columbia, MO (rivalry)	
at No. 9 Ole Miss	Vaught–Hemingway Stadium; Oxford, MS	L 3–31
No. 7 Texas	Faurot Field; Columbia, MO	L 20–34
Texas A&M	Faurot Field; Columbia, MO	W 27–6

=== Non-conference opponents ===
Announced schedules as of November 17, 2026.

2027	2028	2029	2030	2031	2032	2033	2034	2035
Florida Atlantic; Aug 28	San Diego State; Sep 2	Missouri State; Sep 1	Southeast Missouri; Aug 31	at Colorado; Aug 30	Northern Illinois; Sep 4	Missouri State; Sep 3	San Diego State; Sep 9	at BYU; Sep 8
Illinois State; Sep 4	Southeast Missouri; Sep 9	Illinois (rivalry); Sep 15	Colorado; Sep 7	Kansas (Border War); Sep 6	at Cincinnati; Sep 11	at San Diego State; Sep 10	at Illinois (rivalry); Sep 16	Illinois (rivalry); Sep 15
Cincinnati; Sep 18	Northern Illinois; Sep 30	at Northern Illinois; Sep 29	at North Texas; Sep 14	North Texas; Sep 13	at Kansas (Border War); TBA	Illinois (rivalry); Sep 17		
		Army; Oct 13	Florida Atlantic; Oct 12	at Florida Atlantic; Sept 20		Army; Oct 15		
