= Ralph Stevenson (American football) =

American football player (1917–1987)

- Stevenson in 1938

No. 4
- Positions: Guard, Linebacker

Personal information
- Born: April 11, 1917; Ponca City, Oklahoma, U.S.
- Died: July 7, 1987 (aged 70); Norman, Oklahoma, U.S.
- Listed height: 5 ft 10 in (1.78 m)
- Listed weight: 196 lb (89 kg)

Career information
- High school: Ponca City
- College: Oklahoma (1936-1939)
- NFL draft: 1940: 18th round, 165th overall pick

Career history
- Cleveland Rams (1940)

Awards and highlights
- 2× Second-team All-Big Six (1938, 1939)

Career NFL statistics
- Games played: 3
- Stats at Pro Football Reference

Ralph Lee Stevenson (April 11, 1917 – July 7, 1987) was an American football guard. He played college football for the Oklahoma Sooners from 1937 to 1939 and professional football in the National Football League (NFL) for the Cleveland Rams in 1940.

== Early life ==
Stevenson was born in 1917 at Ponca City, Oklahoma, and attended Ponca City High School.

== Oklahoma ==
Stevenson enrolled at the University of Oklahoma in 1936 and played college football for the Oklahoma Sooners from 1937 to 1939. He was a leader on the 1938 Oklahoma Sooners football team that was undefeated in the regular season. One newspaper opined that Stevenson could claim a good share of the credit for Oklahoma's 1938 championship, adding:

According to dopesters, his interference made Oklahoma's running attack function last year. He starts tremendously fast and runs well laterally. A fast charger on offense or defense, he knows how to apply the various blocks.

== Professional football ==
Stevenson was selected by the Cleveland Rams in the 18th round of the 1940 NFL draft. The Cleveland Press in August 1940 wrote: "Ralph Stevenson, handsome and blond, hails from Oklahoma University and brings a formidable reputation as a guard." He appeared in two or three NFL games.

== Later life ==
Stevenson married Nila Lee Anderson i 1943. He died at age 70 in Norman, Oklahoma.
