= George Seeman =

American football player (1916–1998)

No. 68
- Position: End

Personal information
- Born: April 3, 1916; Lincoln, Nebraska, U.S.
- Died: August 31, 1998 (aged 82); Hanover, New Hampshire, U.S.
- Listed height: 6 ft 1 in (1.85 m)
- Listed weight: 195 lb (88 kg)

Career information
- High school: Omaha Central (Omaha, Nebraska)
- College: Nebraska
- NFL draft: 1940: 8th round, 69th overall pick

Career history
- Green Bay Packers (1940); Milwaukee Chiefs (1940)

Awards and highlights
- Second-team All-Big Six (1939)

Career NFL statistics
- Games played: 1
- Stats at Pro Football Reference

George McHenry Seeman Jr. (Note: Sometimes spelled Seemann.) (April 3, 1916 – August 31, 1998) was an American professional football end. He played college football for the Nebraska Cornhuskers, where he was an All-Big Six Conference selection as a senior in 1939. He was selected in the eighth round of the 1940 NFL draft by the Green Bay Packers and appeared in one game that season before being released. After his football career, Seeman served in World War II and then moved to Massachusetts, while he spent his last years in New Hampshire.

== Early life ==
Seeman was born on April 3, 1916, in Lincoln, Nebraska. He attended grade school and high school in Omaha, Nebraska, being a standout end for the football team at Omaha Central High School. In addition to football, Seeman also competed in track and field and wrestling in high school. As a senior at Omaha Central, he won the state heavyweight wrestling championship.

Seeman enrolled at the University of Nebraska in 1935. He played for the Nebraska Cornhuskers freshman football team that year, made the varsity team as a sophomore in 1936 and played at guard. However, while playing a touch football game in early 1937, he suffered a leg injury that resulted in him missing the entire season. He later returned to the Cornhuskers at end and was named honorable mention All-Big Six Conference in 1938 and the second-team All-Big Six as a senior in 1939. He served as a team captain as a senior. Additionally, Seeman lettered in wrestling one year at Nebraska and won the MVIAA title. After his senior football season, he was invited to compete at the Chicago Charities College All-Star Game.

== Professional career ==
Seeman was selected in the eighth round (69th overall) of the 1940 NFL draft by the Green Bay Packers, and he signed with the team in April 1940. In August, before joining the Packers for training camp, he played against the Packers in the Chicago All-Star Game. He initially made the Packers' roster but was later released on September 17, 1940, after having appeared in only one game as a backup. Shortly afterwards, he signed with the Milwaukee Chiefs of the American Football League (AFL); however, he did not appear in any games for the Chiefs.

== Later life and death ==
Seeman joined the United States Army Air Forces in 1941. He coached an Army football team and was also the athletic director for the 35th division. In the Army Air Forces, Seeman reached the rank of captain. He served in World War II and piloted a B-25 bomber, serving over 50 combat missions in the Gilbert and Marshall Islands. He received several honors for his service, including the Distinguished Flying Cross with two oak leaf clusters, the Air Medal with five oak leaf clusters, and the Purple Heart.

Seeman married Suzanne Roeder, and after the war, they moved to Raynham, Massachusetts. He had two daughters and a son. He was interested in real estate and served with the board of directors for the Taunton Savings Bank. He later moved to Glen, New Hampshire, and died in Hanover on August 31, 1998, at the age of 82. In his final years, he had suffered from Alzheimer's disease.
