= Dewey Luster =

American football player and coach (1899–1980)

Biographical details
- Born: February 1, 1899; Tahlequah, Cherokee Nation, U.S.
- Died: October 13, 1980 (aged 81); Norman, Oklahoma, U.S.

Playing career
- 1917–1920: Oklahoma
- Position: Quarterback

Coaching career (HC unless noted)
- 1924: Norman HS (OK)
- 1925: Southwestern State Teachers
- 1926–1928: Norman HS (OK)
- 1929–1931: Oklahoma (line)
- 1932: Colorado Mines (assistant)
- 1933–1936: Norman HS (OK)
- 1937–1939: Oklahoma (backfield)
- 1941–1945: Oklahoma

Head coaching record
- Overall: 32–22–4 (college)

Accomplishments and honors

Championships
- 2 Big Six (1943–1944)

Dewey William "Snorter" Luster (February 1, 1899 – October 13, 1980) was an American football player and coach. He served as the head football coach at Southwestern State Teachers College—now Southwestern Oklahoma State University—in 1925 and at the University of Oklahoma from 1941 to 1945, compiling a career college football coaching record of 32–22–4. Luster was also a player on the Oklahoma Sooners football team from 1917 to 1920 under head coach Bennie Owen and was the captain of the 1920 undefeated team.

Luster was born in Tahlequah, capital of the Cherokee Nation, the son of Otis V. and Callie (Bates) Luster. His father was a merchant and later a newspaper editor in Pauls Valley.

Luster was the head football coach at Norman High School in Norman, Oklahoma in 1924. The following year, he succeeded Carl M. Voyles as the head football coach at Southwestern State Teachers College.

Luster's tenure as head coach at Oklahoma was complicated by World War II. In the six months after the attack on Pearl Harbor, nearly 60 Sooner athletes in all sports had enlisted in some branch of the armed services and more continued to enlist as the war progressed. Luster resigned as head coach almost immediately after his Sooner team lost 47–0 to Oklahoma A&M on November 24, 1945. His official reason for his resignation was "poor health."

== Head coaching record ==
Year	Team	Overall	Conference	Standing
Southwestern State Teachers Bulldogs (Oklahoma Intercollegiate Conference) (1925)
1925	Southwestern State Teachers	5–4–1	3–1–1	4th
Southwestern State Teachers:		5–4–1	3–1–1	
Oklahoma Sooners (Big Six Conference) (1941–1945)
1941	Oklahoma	6–3	3–2	T–2nd
1942	Oklahoma	3–5–2	3–1–1	2nd
1943	Oklahoma	7–2	5–0	1st
1944	Oklahoma	6–3–1	4–0–1	1st
1945	Oklahoma	5–5	4–1	2nd
Oklahoma:		27–18–3	18–4–2	
Total:		32–22–4		
National championship Conference title Conference division title or championship game berth
