= Royal Kahler =

American football player (1918–2005)

No. 46, 72
- Position: Tackle

Personal information
- Born: March 22, 1918; Grand Island, Nebraska, U.S.
- Died: February 21, 2005 (aged 86); Potter, Texas, U.S.
- Listed height: 6 ft 2 in (1.88 m)
- Listed weight: 226 lb (103 kg)

Career information
- High school: Grand Island
- College: Nebraska (1937-1940)
- NFL draft: 1941: 5th round, 31st overall pick

Career history
- Pittsburgh Steelers (1941); Green Bay Packers (1942)

Awards and highlights
- 2× Second-team All-Big Six (1939, 1940)

Career NFL statistics
- Games played: 16
- Kick returns: 1
- Return yards: 3
- Stats at Pro Football Reference

Royal James Kahler (March 22, 1918 – February 21, 2005) was a player in the National Football League (NFL).

== Biography ==
Kahler was born on March 22, 1918, in Grand Island, Nebraska.

== Career ==
Kahler was drafted in the fifth round of the 1941 NFL draft by the Philadelphia Eagles, but his rights were transferred to the Pittsburgh Steelers due to the events later referred to as the Pennsylvania Polka. He played for the Steelers in 1941. The following season, he played with the Green Bay Packers.

He played at the collegiate level at the University of Nebraska.
