= 1938 All-Big Six Conference football team =

The 1938 All-Big Six Conference football team consists of American football players chosen by various organizations for All-Big Six Conference teams for the 1938 college football season. The selectors for the 1938 season included the Associated Press (AP).

== All-Big Six selections ==
=== Backs ===
- Everett Kischer, Iowa State (AP-1)
- Hugh McCullough, Oklahoma (AP-1)
- Paul Christman, Missouri (AP-1 [HB]) (College Football Hall of Fame)
- Elmer Hackney, Kansas State (AP-1)
- Earl Crowder, Oklahoma (AP-2)
- Herm Rohrig, Nebraska (AP-2)
- Jack Dodd, Nebraska (AP-2)
- Henry Wilder, Iowa State (AP-2)

=== Ends ===
- Waddy Young, Oklahoma (AP-1)
- Charles Heileman, Iowa State (AP-1)
- Don Crumbaker, Kansas State (AP-2)
- John Shirk, Oklahoma (AP-2)

=== Tackles ===
- Cliff Duggan, Oklahoma (AP-1)
- Clyde Shugart, Iowa State (AP-1)
- Shirley Davis, Kansas State (AP-2)
- Justin Bowers, Oklahoma (AP-2)

=== Guards ===
- Ferrell Anderson, Kansas (AP-1)
- Ed Bock, Iowa State (AP-1)
- Jim Thomas, Oklahoma (AP-2)
- Ralph Stevenson, Oklahoma (AP-2)

=== Centers ===
- Charley Brock, Nebraska (AP-1)
- Jack Kinnison, Missouri (AP-2)

== Key ==
AP = Associated Press

== See also ==
- 1938 College Football All-America Team
