= Harry Hopp =

American football player (1918–1964)

- Harry Hopp with Lions in 1941

No. 31, 44, 74, 95
- Position: Fullback

Personal information
- Born: December 18, 1918; Hastings, Nebraska, U.S.
- Died: December 22, 1964 (aged 46); Hastings, Nebraska, U.S.
- Listed height: 6 ft 0 in (1.83 m)
- Listed weight: 209 lb (95 kg)

Career information
- High school: Hastings
- College: Nebraska (1937-1940)
- NFL draft: 1941: 3rd round, 20th overall pick

Career history
- Detroit Lions (1941–1943); Buffalo Bisons (1946); Miami Seahawks (1946); Los Angeles Dons (1947)

Awards and highlights
- Pro Bowl (1942); First-team All-Big Six (1940); Second-team All-Big Six (1939)

Career NFL/AAFC statistics
- Rushing yards: 801
- Rushing average: 3
- Receptions: 24
- Receiving yards: 294
- Total touchdowns: 13
- Stats at Pro Football Reference

Harry "Hippity" Hopp (December 18, 1918 – December 22, 1964) was an American professional football player who was a fullback and quarterback in the National Football League (NFL) and the All-America Football Conference (AAFC). He played college football for the Nebraska Cornhuskers. Hopp played for the NFL's Detroit Lions (1941–1943) and the AAFC's Buffalo Bisons (1946), Miami Seahawks (1946), and Los Angeles Dons (1947). His older brother Johnny played 14 years in Major League Baseball from 1939 to 1952.

Hopp was born in 1918 in Hastings, Nebraska. He attended Hastings High School before enrolling at the University of Nebraska. He played college football at Nebraska from 1937 to 1940. He was an all-conference back in 1940 and helped lead the 1940 Cornhuskers to the MVIAA championship, a berth in the Rose Bowl, and the No. 7 ranking in the final AP poll.

Hop was selected by the Detroit Lions in the third round of the 1941 NFL Draft. He appeared in 30 games for the Lions from 1941 to 1943 seasons, including 20 games as a starter. He passed for 258 yards and rushed for 230 in 1942 and was selected to play in the Pro Bowl. In 1943, he caught 17 passes for 229 yards and scored nine touchdowns.

Hopp was married in 1940 to Delores Ann Stromer. He died in 1964 at age 46 of an apparent heart attack in Hastings, Nebraska.
