= Bernie Weiner =

American football player (1918–2004)

No. 33
- Positions: Guard, tackle

Personal information
- Born: January 24, 1918; Newark, New Jersey, U.S.
- Died: October 25, 2004 (aged 86); West Orange, New Jersey, U.S.
- Listed height: 5 ft 11 in (1.80 m)
- Listed weight: 222 lb (101 kg)

Career information
- College: Kansas State (1937-1940)
- NFL draft: 1941: 11th round, 98th overall pick

Career history
- Brooklyn Dodgers (1942)

Awards and highlights
- 2× First-team All-Big Six (1939, 1940)

Career NFL statistics
- Games played: 10
- Games started: 3
- Stats at Pro Football Reference

Bernard Morris Weiner (January 24, 1918 – October 25, 2004) was an American professional football player who played as an offensive lineman for two seasons for the Brooklyn Dodgers, who selected him in the 11th round of the 1941 NFL draft.
