= 1939 All-Big Six Conference football team =

The 1939 All-Big Six Conference football team consists of American football players chosen by various organizations for All-Big Six Conference teams for the 1939 college football season. The selectors for the 1939 season included the Associated Press (AP).

== All-Big Six selections ==
=== Backs ===
- Paul Christman, Missouri (AP-1 [QB]) (College Football Hall of Fame)
- Beryl Clark, Oklahoma (AP-1)
- Herman Rohrig, Nebraska (AP-1)
- Bob Seymour, Oklahoma (AP-1)
- Melvin Seelye, Kansas State (AP-2)
- Harry Hopp, Nebraska (AP-2)
- Richard Amerine, Kansas (AP-2)
- William Cunningham, Missouri (AP-2)

=== Ends ===
- Frank Ivy, Oklahoma (AP-1)
- Don Crumbaker, Kansas State (AP-1)
- George Seeman, Nebraska (AP-2)
- Roland Orf, Missouri (AP-2)

=== Tackles ===
- Bernie Weiner, Kansas State (AP-1)
- Cliff Duggan, Oklahoma (AP-1)
- Kenneth Haas, Missouri (AP-2)
- Royal Kahler, Nebraska (AP-2)

=== Guards ===
- Warren Alfson, Nebraska (AP-1)
- Robert Waldorf, Missouri (AP-1)
- William Beezley, Kansas State (AP-2)
- Ralph Stevenson, Oklahoma (AP-2)

=== Centers ===
- Jack West, Iowa State (AP-1)
- Cliff Speegle, Oklahoma (AP-2)

== Key ==
AP = Associated Press

== See also ==
- 1939 College Football All-America Team
