= 1940 All-Big Six Conference football team =

The 1940 All-Big Six Conference football team consists of American football players chosen by various organizations for All-Big Six Conference teams for the 1940 college football season. The selectors for the 1940 season included the Associated Press (AP) and the United Press (UP).

== All-Big Six selections ==
=== Backs ===
- Paul Christman, Missouri (AP-1; UP-1 [QB]) (College Football Hall of Fame)
- Harry Hopp, Nebraska (AP-1; UP-1 [HB])
- Walter Luther, Nebraska (AP-1; UP-1 [HB])
- John Martin, Oklahoma (AP-1; UP-1 [FB])
- Roy Petsch, Nebraska (AP-2; UP-2 [QB])
- Herm Rohrig, Nebraska (AP-2; UP-2 [HB])
- Henry Wilder, Iowa State (AP-2; UP-2 [FB])
- Vike Francis, Nebraska (AP-2)
- Jack Jacobs, Oklahoma (UP-2 [HB])

=== Ends ===
- Ray Prochaska, Nebraska (AP-1; UP-1)
- Bill Jennings, Oklahoma (AP-1; UP-1)
- Fred Preston, Nebraska (AP-2; UP-2)
- Bob Steuber, Missouri (AP-2)
- Bob Crocker, Missouri (UP-2)

=== Tackles ===
- Forrest Behm, Nebraska (AP-1; UP-1) (College Football Hall of Fame)
- Roger Eason, Oklahoma (AP-1; UP-2)
- Bernie Weiner, Kansas State (AP-2; UP-1)
- Royal Kahler, Nebraska (AP-2)
- Bob Wakeman, Missouri (UP-2)

=== Guards ===
- Warren Alfson, Nebraska (AP-1; UP-1)
- Ed Schwartzkopf, Nebraska (AP-1; UP-2)
- Hal Lahar, Oklahoma (AP-2; UP-1)
- Tom Smith, Iowa State (AP-2; UP-2)

=== Centers ===
- Don Pierce, Kansas (AP-1; UP-1)
- Darold Jenkins, Missouri (AP-2)
- Ken Hamkil, Kansas State (UP-2)

== Key ==
- AP = Associated Press
- UP = United Press

== See also ==
- 1940 College Football All-America Team
