= Herm Rohrig =

American football player (1918–2002)

Herman Rohrig
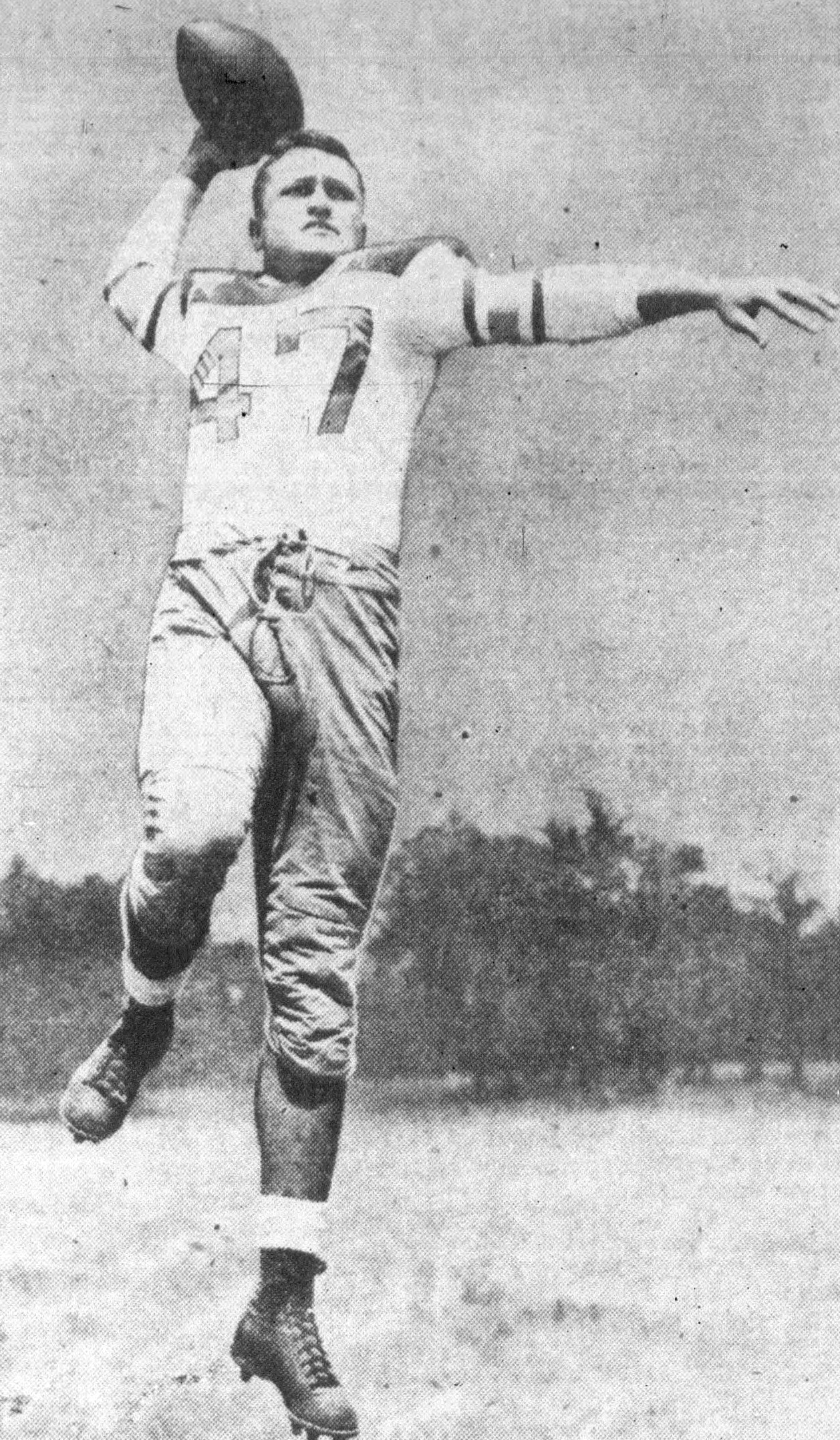
- Rohrig, circa 1945

No. 8, 80
- Positions: Wingback, Halfback

Personal information
- Born: March 19, 1918; Mason City, Iowa, U.S.
- Died: July 14, 2002 (aged 84); Lincoln, Nebraska, U.S.
- Listed height: 5 ft 8 in (1.73 m)
- Listed weight: 190 lb (86 kg)

Career information
- High school: Lincoln
- College: Nebraska (1936, 1938-1940)
- NFL draft: 1941: 6th round, 46th overall pick

Career history
- Green Bay Packers (1941, 1946–1947)

Awards and highlights
- First-team All-Big Six (1939); 2× Second-team All-Big Six (1938, 1940)

Career NFL statistics
- Receptions: 13
- Receiving yards: 94
- Return yards: 357
- Field goal attempts: 1
- Field goals made: 1
- Stats at Pro Football Reference

Herman Francis "Stumpy" Rohrig (March 19, 1918 – July 14, 2002) was an American professional football player who played professionally in the National Football League (NFL). He was drafted by the Green Bay Packers in the sixth round of the 1941 NFL draft and would play three seasons with the team. Following his retirement as a player, he worked as an official and a scout in the NFL and serve as an alternate field judge for Super Bowl I. He also was a supervisor of officials for the Big Ten Conference, mentoring future NFL referee Jerry Markbreit and numerous others who reached the professional ranks.

A graduate of Lincoln High School in Lincoln, Nebraska, Rohrig was inducted into the Nebraska Sports Hall of Fame.
