= Harry Ice =

American football player (1918–1997)

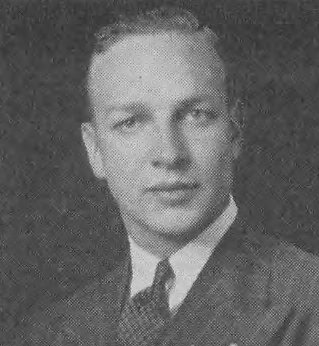
- Ice c. 1940

Biographical details
- Born: August 20, 1918
- Died: October 16, 1996 (aged 78)

Playing career
- 194\–1941: Missouri
- Position(s): Halfback

Administrative career (AD unless noted)
- ?: Missouri (assistant)

Accomplishments and honors

Awards
- First-team All-Big Six (1941)

Harry "Slippery" Ice (August 20, 1918 – October 16, 1997) was a record-setting halfback for the University of Missouri Tigers football team, and a long-time member of the Tigers' Athletic Department.

Harry Ice grew up in Kansas City and attended Wentworth Military Academy in Lexington, Missouri from 1936 to 1939. At Wentworth, he was on the football, basketball, track, and baseball teams, captaining both the basketball and track squads. He was named the school's best all-around athlete in 1938.

He entered the University of Missouri in 1939, and did not initially go out for football. But legendary coach Don Faurot spotted Ice on the intramural fields, while playing for Beta Theta Pi, and convinced him to try out for the varsity. In 1940 and 1941, Ice established himself as one of the Tigers' top all-time running backs. In 1941, "Slippery Ice", as he was known, set a number of Missouri records as a member of Faurot's first split-T team that led the nation in rushing. Ice's records include 240 yards rushing (on only 8 carries) against Kansas in 1941, an average of 30.0 yards per in that same game, and a 95-yard touchdown run against Iowa State in 1941. His single game rushing record stood until 1998, and the other records still stand. Ice was an all-Big Six selection in 1941 as Missouri won the conference championship and went on to the Sugar Bowl, where he was the game's MVP. Ice played in the College All-Star Game in the summer of 1942, and was chosen to MU's All-Century Football Team. He also lettered twice in baseball.

He joined the United States Army as a Second Lieutenant in January 1942, and was discharged as a Major in August 1946. He was overseas for thirty months in the Southwest Pacific Theater. He was in three campaigns and the occupation in Japan with the 33rd Infantry Division. He received the Combat Infantryman Badge, Bronze Star, Purple Heart with Oak Leaf Cluster and two special citations.

Ice joined the M.U. athletic staff in 1952, and served in a variety of capacities, including interim athletic director and assistant athletic director, until his retirement in 1979. He was inducted into the Missouri Sports Hall of Fame in 1993. He died at age 78 in 1996.
