= Jack Jacobs =

American football player (1919–1974)

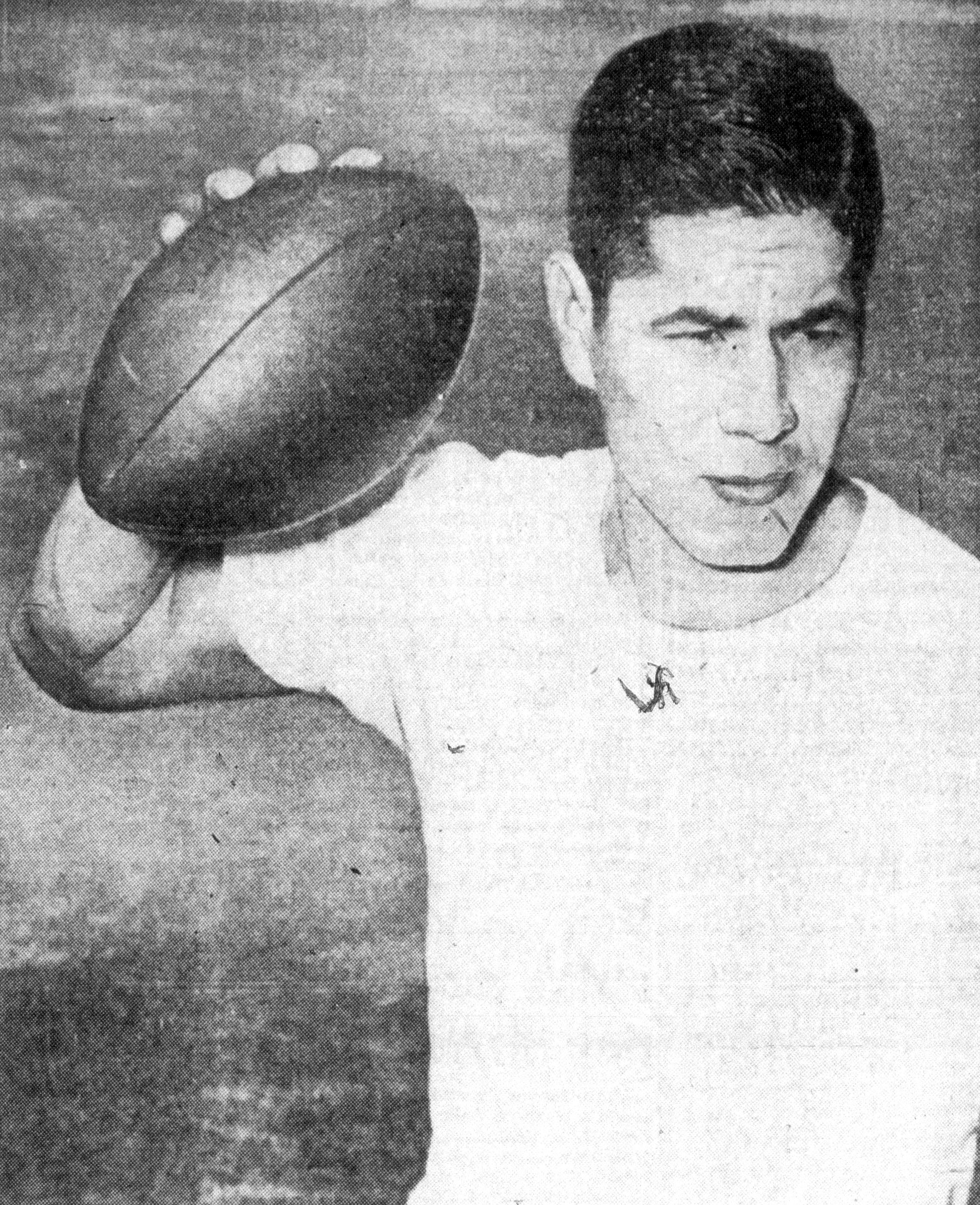
- Jacobs, circa 1944

No. 43, 77, 27, 87
- Positions: Quarterback, halfback

Personal information
- Born: August 7, 1919; Holdenville, Oklahoma, U.S.
- Died: January 12, 1974 (aged 54); Greensboro, North Carolina, U.S.
- Listed height: 6 ft 1 in (1.85 m)
- Listed weight: 186 lb (84 kg)

Career information
- High school: Muskogee (Muskogee, Oklahoma)
- College: Oklahoma (1938-1941)
- NFL draft: 1942: 2nd round, 12th overall pick

Career history

Playing
- Cleveland Rams (1942, 1945); Washington Redskins (1946); Green Bay Packers (1947–1949); Winnipeg Blue Bombers (1950-1954); London Lords (1956); Toledo Tornadoes (1964)

Coaching
- London Lords (1956-1957) Head coach; Hamilton Tiger-Cats (1958–1959) Backfield coach; Montreal Alouettes (1961–1962) Assistant coach; Edmonton Eskimos (1963) Backfield coach; Toledo Tornadoes (1964) Assistant coach

Awards and highlights
- NFL champion (1945); 3× CFL All-Star (1950-1952); Jeff Nicklin Memorial Trophy (1952); First-team All-Big Six (1941); Second-team All-Big Six (1940)

Career NFL statistics
- Passing yards: 3,268
- TD-INT: 27-49
- Passer rating: 42.9
- Punts: 187
- Punting yards: 7,886
- Defensive interceptions: 12
- Stats at Pro Football Reference

Head coaching record
- Career: 11–9–2 (.545)
- Canadian Football Hall of Fame

Jack Jacobs (August 7, 1919 – January 13, 1967), nicknamed "Indian Jack", was an American professional football player who was a quarterback in the National Football League (NFL) and Western Interprovincial Football Union. He was a charter member of the Canadian Football Hall of Fame, inducted in 1963.

== Early life ==
Jacobs was born in Holdenville, Oklahoma, and played high school football at Muskogee High School. He was popularly known as "Indian Jack" because he was a citizen of the Muscogee Nation.

== College career ==
Jacobs played college football for the Oklahoma Sooners. Considered a phenomenal all-round player, Jack started at both quarterback and punter as well as conerback, where he averaged 47.84 yards per kick in 1940 (which remains an OU record) and finished his collegiate career with a career average of 42.10. Jacobs accumulated the most offense yardage in 1940/1941 (junior & senior years). As a defensive back, Jacobs is tied with seven other players for the record number of interceptions in a game (3) (1941 OU vs. Marquette). He also played on the Sooner baseball team.

== Professional career ==
=== National Football League ===
Jacobs was selected in the second round of the 1942 NFL draft. He played quarterback, defensive back, tailback, halfback, punter in the National Football League with the Cleveland Rams in 1942 and 1945 (serving in the U.S. Army Air Force during World War Two), the Washington Redskins in 1946 and the Green Bay Packers from 1947 to 1949. he led the league in punting in 1947.

=== Western Interprovincial Football Union ===
Jacobs then joined the Western Interprovincial Football Union as a quarterback for the Winnipeg Blue Bombers (1950–1954), for whom he won the Jeff Nicklin Memorial Trophy in 1952. Though Jacobs did not invent the forward pass, he is widely recognized as one of the key figures in making the forward pass an integral part of professional football. His exciting passing game drew thousands of fans to Blue Bombers games, instigating the need for the city to build a larger stadium, Winnipeg Stadium (later called Canad Inns Stadium).

As a Blue Bomber, Jacobs completed 709 of 1,330 passes for 11,094 yards, at that time the all-time leading passer for the Western Interprovincial Football Union. In 1951, he became the first professional football player to throw for 3,000 yards in a season with 3,248. He was also the first player to throw for more than 30 touchdowns with 33. The next season Jacobs threw 34 touchdowns and amassed 2,586 yards. Jacobs had 104 touchdown passes to only 53 interceptions.

With Jacobs as their starting quarterback, the Bombers compiled a record of 46 wins, 27 losses, and three ties. They lost the Grey Cup in 1950 to the Toronto Argonauts (13–0) and again in 1953 to the Hamilton Tiger-Cats (12–6).

Winnipeg Stadium, built in 1953, was nicknamed "The House That Jack Built" because of Jacobs' contribution to the success of the team.

Jacobs was twice a Grey Cup finalist, was named the all-western quarterback twice, and was one of the original inductees to the Canadian Football Hall of Fame in June 1963. He was also inducted into the American Indian Athletic Hall of Fame in 1977, the Oklahoma Sports Hall of Fame in 2002, and the Manitoba Sports Hall of Fame and Museum in 2004. Several records he set while at the University of Oklahoma still stand.

=== Other pro football ===
Jacobs asked for his outright release from the Winnipeg Blue Bombers in February 1956. After being waived out of the WIFU, Jacobs signed a contract with the London Lords (ORFU) as the head coach. Jacobs also played most of the season for the Lords.

In 1957, Jacobs added the role of general manager to his duties with the London Lords. Jacobs played in one exhibition game in 1957.

After serving as an assistant coach in the CFL, Jacobs returned to the field as a player in 1964. Jacobs suited up for the Toledo Tornadoes (United Football League) and saw action primarily as a punter although he did see some action at quarterback as well.

Jacobs put on the pads for one final game on July 18, 1966, dressing for the Winnipeg Blue Bombers in an exhibition game.

== Career regular season statistics ==
Year	Team	GP	Passing							Punting					Interceptions				
Year	Team	GP	Att	Com	%	Yds	TD	Int	Lg	#	Yds	Ave.	Lg	S	No	Yds	Ave.	Lg	TD
1942	Cleveland Rams	8	93	43	46.2	640	6	6	67	33	1395	42.3	66		4	22	5.5	22	0
1943	Military service																		
1944	Military service																		
1945	Cleveland Rams	2	5	3	60.0	12	0	0	11	1	43	43.0	43		-	-	-	-	-
1946	Washington Redskins	9	12	5	41.7	98	0	2	35	10	428	42.8	61		2	56	28.0	42	0
1947	Green Bay Packers	12	242	108	44.6	1615	16	17	69	57	2481	43.5	74		4	64	16.0	29	0
1948	Green Bay Packers	12	184	82	44.6	848	5	21	64	69	2782	40.3	78		-	-	-	-	-
1949	Green Bay Packers	12	16	3	18.8	55	0	3	39	17	757	44.5	58		2	26	13.0	26	0
1950	Winnipeg Blue Bombers	12	187	85	45.5	1604	14	8		94	3772	40.1	70	18	-	-	-	-	-
1951	Winnipeg Blue Bombers	14	355	204	57.5	3248	33	10	100	95	3900	41.1	0	10	-	-	-	-	-
1952	Winnipeg Blue Bombers	16	286	147	51.4	2586	34	12		103	4522	43.9	88	13	3	15	5.0	10	0
1953	Winnipeg Blue Bombers	16	252	146	57.9	1924	11	10		112	4440	39.6	80	6	1	0	0.0	0	0
1954	Winnipeg Blue Bombers	16	250	127	50.8	1732	12	13		114	4614	40.5	82	8	-	-	-	-	-
	CFL totals		1330	709	53.3	11094	104	53	100	518	21248	41.0	88	55	4	15	3.8	10	0
	NFL totals		552	244	44.2	3268	27	49	69	187	7886	42.2	78		12	168	14.0	42	0
	Totals		1882	953	50.6	14362	131	102	100	705	29134	41.3	88	55	16	183	11.4	42	0

== Head coaching record ==
Team	Year	Regular season				
Team	Year	Won	Lost	Ties	Win %	Finish
LON	1956	3	7	0	.300	4th in ORFU
LON	1957	8	2	2	.750	1st in ORFU
Total		11	9	2	.545	

== Post NFL career ==
In 1955, Jacobs was a scout for the Winnipeg Blue Bombers and later, was a coach for the London Lords of the Ontario Rugby Football Union (ORFU) for two seasons. He also worked as an assistant coach for the Hamilton Tiger-Cats, Montreal Alouettes and the Edmonton Eskimos.

Jacobs was also an actor who played a professional football player in the 1948 movie, Triple Threat. Jacobs died in 1974 in Greensboro, North Carolina from a sudden heart attack.
