= Beryl Clark =

American football player (1917–2000)

- Clark in 1939

No. 25
- Position: Halfback

Personal information
- Born: October 13, 1917; Cherokee, Oklahoma, U.S.
- Died: January 15, 2000 (aged 82); Cherokee, Oklahoma, U.S.
- Listed height: 5 ft 11 in (1.80 m)
- Listed weight: 170 lb (77 kg)

Career information
- High school: Cherokee
- College: Oklahoma (1936-1939)
- NFL draft: 1940: 16th round, 141st overall pick

Career history
- Chicago Cardinals (1940)

Awards and highlights
- Second-team All-American (1939); First-team All-Big Six (1939)

Career NFL statistics
- Passing yards: 316
- TD–INT: 2-6
- Passer rating: 32.6
- Stats at Pro Football Reference

Beryl Leon Clark (October 13, 1917 – January 15, 2000) was an American professional football player.

Clark was born in Cherokee, Oklahoma, in 1917, an attended Cherokee High School.

He played college football for the Oklahoma Sooners football team from 1936 to 1939. As a senior in 1939, he completed 40 of 66 passes for a 60.6% completion rate. His completion percentage was the highest in the county. He also led the Sooners with 680 yards from scrimmage. He also led the Big Six Conference with 50 points scored (eight touchdowns and two extra points). He was selected by both the conference coaches and the Associated Press as a first-team back on their respective 1939 All-Big Six Conference football teams. He was also selected by the International News Service as a second-team halfback on the 1939 College Football All-America Team.

He was drafted by the Chicago Cardinals in the 16th round with the 141st pick in the 1940 NFL draft and played for the Cardinals during the 1940 NFL season. He appeared in 10 games for the Cardinals, completed 25 passes for 316 yards and two touchdowns and kicked three extra points.

During World War II, Clark served as a pilot in the Air Transport Command, "flying the hump" between Burma and China.

Clark died in 2000 at age 82 in Cherokee, Oklahoma.
