= Roger Eason =

American football player (1918–1998)

No. 43, 40
- Position: Guard

Personal information
- Born: July 31, 1918; Pauls Valley, Oklahoma, U.S.
- Died: April 28, 1998 (aged 79); Houston, Texas, U.S.
- Listed height: 6 ft 1 in (1.85 m)
- Listed weight: 227 lb (103 kg)

Career information
- High school: Central (Oklahoma City, Oklahoma)
- College: Oklahoma (1938-1941)
- NFL draft: 1942: 3rd round, 17th overall pick

Career history
- Cleveland/Los Angeles Rams (1945–1948); Green Bay Packers (1949)

Awards and highlights
- NFL champion (1945); 2× First-team All-Big Six (1940, 1941)

Career NFL statistics
- Games played: 44
- Games started: 26
- Fumble recoveries: 3
- Stats at Pro Football Reference

Charles Roger Eason Jr. (July 31, 1918 – April 28, 1998) was a guard in the National Football League (NFL).

== Biography ==
Eason was born on July 31, 1918, in Pauls Valley, Oklahoma.

== Career ==
Eason was drafted in the third round of the 1942 NFL draft by the Cleveland Rams and played four seasons with the team, including when the team made the move to Los Angeles, California. During his final season, he played with the Green Bay Packers.

He played at the collegiate level at the University of Oklahoma.
