= Hub Ulrich =

American football player (1920–1974)

- Ulrich, c. 1969

No. 51
- Position: End

Personal information
- Born: December 12, 1920; Jennings, Oklahoma, U.S.
- Died: March 10, 1974 (aged 53); Topeka, Kansas, U.S.
- Listed height: 6 ft 0 in (1.83 m)
- Listed weight: 205 lb (93 kg)

Career information
- High school: Quinter (KS)
- College: Kansas
- NFL draft: 1942: 9th round, 72 (by the Cleveland Rams)th overall pick

Career history
- Miami Seahawks (1946)

Awards and highlights
- First-team All-Big Six (1941)

Career NFL statistics
- Receptions: 4
- Receiving yards: 75
- Touchdowns: 1
- Stats at Pro Football Reference

Hubert J. Ulrich Jr. (December 12, 1920 – March 10, 1974) was an American professional football end.

Ulrich was born in Jennings, Oklahoma, in 1920 but moved to southwest Kansas as a child. He attended Quinter High School in Kansas. He and played college football for Kansas, graduating in 1943.

He was selected by the Cleveland Rams in the ninth round (72nd overall pick) of the 1942 NFL draft. He did not play for the Rams, instead joining the Naval Reserve and serving as commander of a P.T. boat in the Southwest Pacific. After the war, he played in the All-America Football Conference (AAFC) for the Miami Seahawks in 1946. He appeared in a total of 14 professional games, six of them as a starter, and caught four passes for 75 yards and a touchdown.

He later served as a high school football coach and was a member of the Kansas Jayhawks coaching staff from 1950 to 1954. He then worked in the oil business for 15 years. He joined the Kansas motor vehicle department in 1969 and held various executive positions there until the time of his death. He died of a heart attack in 1974 at age 53 in Topeka, Kansas.
