= Truman the Tiger =

Mascot of the athletic teams of the University of Missouri Tigers

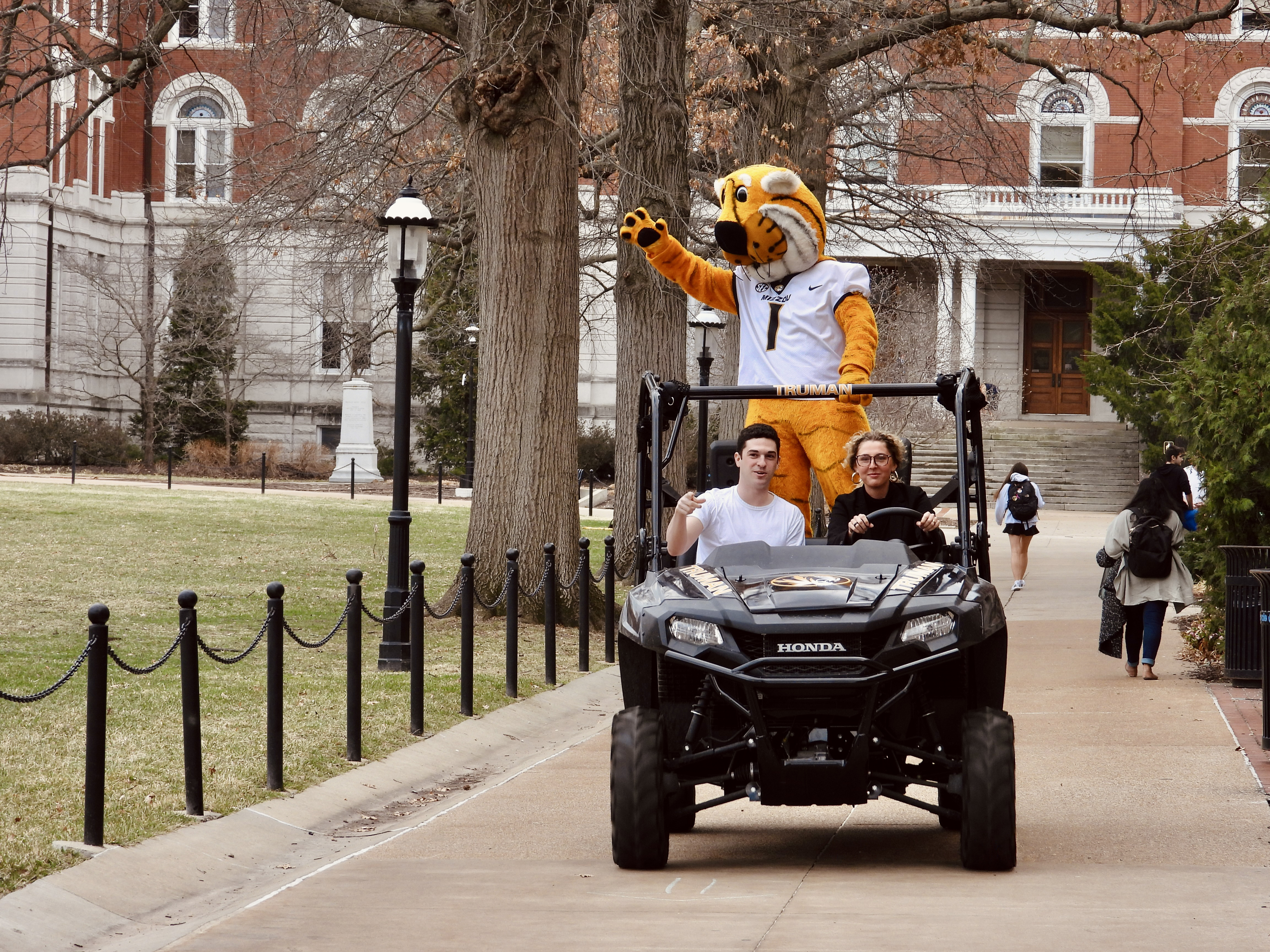
- University: University of Missouri
- Conference: SEC
- Description: Anthropomorphic Bengal tiger
- Origin of name: Missourian Harry S. Truman
- First seen: 1986

Truman the Tiger is the official mascot of the athletic teams of the University of Missouri Tigers. Truman is named after U.S. President Harry S. Truman, who was from the U.S. state of Missouri. The mascot was named on September 12, 1986, though the use of a Bengal tiger as Missouri's mascot is traced to the 1890s. Truman competes annually in the NCA College National Championship Mascot Division which typically includes a consistent field of around 15 participating mascots; Truman has won the competition several times, most recently in 2024.

Truman is best known to Mizzou fans for his "tail-spin" during the "Missouri Waltz", doing push-ups with the ROTC after the Tigers score, and for riding into home football games on a 1950s-vintage Boone County fire truck ("Truman's Taxi"), painted gold and black and outfitted with several Missouri flags. The mascot makes hundreds of appearances statewide at university functions, sporting events and at private parties, where he can be hired for a small donation. Actors playing Truman, in contrast to at other schools, are semi-public: they are usually introduced as "Truman" during Senior Night festivities at the last home football and basketball games of the year. On the day of the 2011 Independence Bowl featuring Missouri and North Carolina, Truman accidentally broke the crystal bowl that was part of the trophy to be awarded to the victorious team.

== History ==
In 1864, while in the midst of the American Civil War, the board of curators suspended operations of the university. It was during this time that the residents of Columbia formed a "home guard" unit that became notoriously known as the "Fighting Tigers of Columbia". This name was given because of the group's steadfast readiness to fight against Confederate-sympathetic bushwhackers under the command of "Bloody Bill" Anderson, who hoped to plunder the city and university. Later, in 1890, an alumnus suggested the university's newly formed football team be called the "Tigers" out of respect for those who fought to defend Columbia.

== The Tiger ==
"The Tiger" was the official mascot of the University of Missouri before Truman took his place in 1986. Truman's predecessor was a "plain grey" tiger with black stripes that was simply known as "The Tiger". "The Tiger" was officially replaced by "Truman The Tiger" before the 1986 football season.

== See also ==
- History of the University of Missouri
