= Forrest Behm =

American football player (1919–2015)

Profile
- Position: Tackle

Personal information
- Born: July 31, 1919; Lincoln, Nebraska, U.S.
- Died: June 29, 2015 (aged 95); Corning, New York, U.S.

Career information
- College: University of Nebraska

Awards and highlights
- First-team All-American (1940); First-team All-Big Six (1940)
- College Football Hall of Fame

Forrest Edwin Behm (July 31, 1919 – June 29, 2015) was an American football player. He played college football for the Nebraska Cornhuskers. He was elected to the College Football Hall of Fame in 1988. In 1992, he was awarded an honorary Doctor of Humane Letters from the University of Nebraska.
