= Darold Jenkins =

American college football player (1919–1986)

No. 42
- Position: Center

Personal information
- Born: June 6, 1919; Pettis County, Missouri, U.S.
- Died: September 16, 1986 (aged 67); Independence, Missouri, U.S.
- Listed height: 6 ft 0 in (1.83 m)
- Listed weight: 190 lb (86 kg)

Career information
- High school: Higginsville
- College: Missouri (1939–1941)

Awards and highlights
- Consensus All-American (1941); First-team All-Big Six (1941); Second-team All-Big Six (1940); Missouri Tigers No. 42 retired
- College Football Hall of Fame (Class of 1976)

Darold Jenkins (June 6, 1919 – September 16, 1986) was an American college football center. He was elected to the College Football Hall of Fame in 1976.

== Biography ==
Jenkins first joined Don Faurot's Missouri Tigers as a fullback, spending most of his time on the bench. By mid way through his junior year, Jenkins had taken over as the starting center and went on to earn All Big Six Conference honors that season.

In 1941, as a senior, Jenkins captained Missouri to a Big Six Conference Championship and an appearance in the Sugar Bowl against the Fordham Rams. Jenkins again earned All Big Six Conference honors and became the first Tiger to earn consensus All-America honors.

After college, Jenkins was a bomber pilot in World War II. Flying his 27th mission, he was shot down and spent 17 months in a Nazi Germany POW camp.

Upon his discharge from the military, Jenkins went to law school, becoming a practicing attorney in 1952, eventually working for the Missouri State Highway Commission. He died September 16, 1986.

== Legacy ==
Faurot said of Jenkins, "I would put him on my all-time Missouri team. He is fine on the field and off. Works just as hard in practices as in a game. And he is just as good on offense as defense. You must remember the center is a main cog in our quick breaking T formation."

Jenkins was inducted into the Missouri Sports Hall of Fame in 1971, the College Football Hall of Fame in 1976, and was a member of the inaugural class inducted into the University of Missouri Intercollegiate Athletics Hall of Fame in 1990.

Jenkins was also named to the Missouri All-Homecoming Centennial Team in 2011.
