= 1941 All-Big Six Conference football team =

The 1941 All-Big Six Conference football team consists of American football players chosen by various organizations for All-Big Six Conference teams for the 1941 college football season. The selectors for the 1941 season included the Associated Press (AP) and the United Press (UP).

The 1941 Missouri Tigers football team won the Big Six championship, was ranked No. 7 in the final AP Poll, and placed five players on the first team: quarterback Harry Ice (AP-1, UP-1); halfback Bob Steuber (AP-1, UP-1); tackle Norville Wallach (AP-1, UP-1); guard Robert Jeffries (AP-1, UP-1); and center Darold Jenkins (AP-1, UP-1).

The 1941 Nebraska Cornhuskers football team finished second in the conference and placed two players on the first team: halfback Dale Bradley (AP-1, UP-1) and guard George Abel (AP-1, UP-1).

One All-Big Six Conference selection would later become more notable as a coach in another sport. Second-team back Ralph Miller of Kansas was later inducted into the Naismith Memorial Basketball Hall of Fame as a coach.

== All-Big Six selections ==
=== Backs ===
- Harry Ice, Missouri (AP-1, UP-1 [QB]) (College Football Hall of Fame)
- Bob Steuber, Missouri (AP-1, UP-1 [HB])
- Dale Bradley, Nebraska (AP-1, UP-1 [HB])
- Jack Jacobs, Oklahoma (AP-1, UP-1 [FB])
- Maurice "Red" Wade, Missouri (AP-2, UP-2 [QB])
- Ralph Miller, Kansas (AP-2, UP-2 [HB])
- Orville Mathews, Oklahoma (AP-2, UP-2 [HB])
- Lyle Wilkins, Kansas State (UP-2 [FB])
- Don Reece, Missouri (AP-2)

=== Ends ===
- Hub Ulrich, Kansas (AP-1, UP-1)
- Frank Barnhart, Kansas State (UP-1)
- Fred Preston, Kansas (AP-1, UP-2)
- Bert Ekern, Missouri (AP-2, UP-2)

=== Tackles ===
- Roger Eason, Oklahoma (AP-1, UP-1)
- Norville Wallach, Missouri (AP-1, UP-1)
- Clarence Herndon, Nebraska (UP-2)
- Robert Brenton, Missouri (AP-2, UP-2)

=== Guards ===
- George Abel, Nebraska (AP-1, UP-1)
- Robert Jeffries, Missouri (AP-1, UP-1)
- Ralph Harris, Oklahoma (UP-2)
- LaVerne Lewis, Iowa State (UP-2)
- Fred Meier, Nebraska (AP-2)

=== Centers ===
- Darold Jenkins, Missouri (AP-1, UP-1) (College Football Hall of Fame)
- John Hancock, Kansas State (AP-2, UP-2)

== Key ==
AP = Associated Press UP = United Press

== See also ==
- 1941 College Football All-America Team
