= 1941 Michigan Wolverines football team =

American college football season

1941 Michigan Wolverines football
- Conference: Big Ten Conference

Ranking
- AP: No. 5
- Record: 6–1–1 (3–1–1 Big Ten)
- Head coach: Fritz Crisler (4th season)
- Offensive scheme: Single-wing
- MVP: Reuben Kelto
- Captain: Bob Westfall
- Home stadium: Michigan Stadium

1941 Big Ten Conference football standings
	Conf.					Overall
Team	W		L		T	W		L		T
No. 1 Minnesota $	5	–	0	–	0	8	–	0	–	0
No. 5 Michigan	3	–	1	–	1	6	–	1	–	1
No. 13 Ohio State	3	–	1	–	1	6	–	1	–	1
No. 11 Northwestern	4	–	2	–	0	5	–	3	–	0
Wisconsin	3	–	3	–	0	3	–	5	–	0
Iowa	2	–	4	–	0	3	–	5	–	0
Purdue	1	–	3	–	0	2	–	5	–	1
Indiana	1	–	3	–	0	2	–	6	–	0
Illinois	0	–	5	–	0	2	–	6	–	0
$ – Conference champion; Rankings from AP Poll

The 1941 Michigan Wolverines football team represented the University of Michigan in the 1941 Big Ten Conference football season. Under fourth-year head coach Fritz Crisler, Michigan compiled a record of 6–1–1 (3–1–1 Big Ten), outscored opponents 147 to 41 and was ranked No. 5 in the final AP Poll. The team played three ranked opponents, defeating No. 5 Northwestern (14–7), playing to a tie with No. 14 Ohio State (20–20), and losing by a 7–0 score to the 1941 Minnesota team that won the 1941 national championship. With a strong, veteran line, the Wolverines also shut out four of their eight opponents: Pittsburgh (40–0); Columbia (28–0); Illinois (20–0); and Iowa (6–0).

Fullback Bob Westfall was selected as a consensus first-team player on both the 1941 College Football All-America Team and the All-Big Ten Conference team. Halfback Tom Kuzma was the team's leading scorer with 48 points, and tackle Reuben Kelto received the team's Most Valuable Player award. Tackle Al Wistert received second-team All-America honors, and center Robert Ingalls was selected as a first-team All-Big Ten honors.

== Schedule ==
Date	Opponent	Rank	Site	Result	Attendance
September 27	Michigan State*		Michigan Stadium; Ann Arbor, MI (rivalry)	W 19–7	66,389
October 4	Iowa		Michigan Stadium; Ann Arbor, MI	W 6–0	29,807
October 11	Pittsburgh*		Michigan Stadium; Ann Arbor, MI	W 40–0	33,848
October 18	at No. 5 Northwestern	No. 6	Dyche Stadium; Evanston, IL (rivalry)	W 14–7	43,264
October 25	No. 1 Minnesota^{†}	No. 3	Michigan Stadium; Ann Arbor, MI (Little Brown Jug)	L 0–7	84,658
November 1	at Illinois	No. 7	Memorial Stadium; Champaign, IL (rivalry)	W 20–0	31,554
November 15	at Columbia*	No. 7	Baker Field; New York, NY	W 28–0	31,181
November 22	No. 14 Ohio State	No. 5	Michigan Stadium; Ann Arbor, MI (rivalry)	T 20–20	84,581
*Non-conference game; ^{†}Homecoming; Rankings from AP Poll released prior to the game

== Rankings ==
Ranking movements Legend: ██ Increase in ranking ██ Decrease in ranking ( ) = First-place votes
	Week							
Poll	1	2	3	4	5	6	7	Final
AP	6 (1)	3 (7)	7	8	7	5	6	5

== Season summary ==
=== Pre-season ===
The 1940 Michigan Wolverines football team had compiled a 7–1 record and was ranked No. 3 in the final AP Poll. Michigan's coaching staff remained largely intact in 1941, with head coach Fritz Crisler returning for his fourth season and taking on an added role as athletic director following the retirement of Fielding H. Yost.

From the 1940 team, the Wolverines lost five key starters to graduation: halfback Tom Harmon, quarterback Forest Evashevski, end Ed Frutig and guards Ralph Fritz and Milo Sukup. In addition, halfback Cliff Wise was lost to the military draft, and several other players from the 1940 team were lost when they voluntarily enlisted in the military. Michigan's enlistees included halfback Bob Krejsa, fullback Bob Zimmerman, and tackle Jack Butler. Key veterans returning from the 1940 team included fullback and senior team captain, Bob Westfall, who was the nation's fourth leading rusher during the 1940 college football season with 807 net rushing yards. Michigan also returned several veteran linemen, including starting center Robert Ingalls and tackles Al Wistert and Reuben Kelto.

In an article published in mid-September, coach Crisler predicted that Michigan's outlook for another superior team was dim. Michigan's biggest task in the pre-season was to find a player to take on the tailback position that had been filled by Tom Harmon from 1938 to 1940. As fall practice got underway, the leading prospects to take over Harmon's position included the following individuals: Tom Kuzma, a sophomore and a native of Harmon's home town of Gary, Indiana; David M. Nelson, who was later inducted into the College Football Hall of Fame as a coach; Paul White, who later played for the Pittsburgh Steelers; Don Robinson, who served as a heavy bomber pilot in World War II; and Harold "Tippy" Lockard, a junior from Canton, Ohio, who enlisted in the Army Air Corps after the attack on Pearl Harbor. Despite receiving an invitation from coach Crisler, sophomore track star Bob Ufer, who had played halfback in high school, did not report to the football team, opting instead to focus on track.

=== Week 1: Michigan State ===
Week 1: Michigan State at Michigan

Team	1	2	3	4	Total
Michigan State	7	0	0	0	7
• Michigan	0	7	12	0	19

- Date: September 27, 1941
- Location: Michigan Stadium
  Ann Arbor, Michigan
- Game attendance: 67,079

On September 27, 1941, Michigan defeated Michigan State by a 19 to 7 score. The game was Michigan's first without Tom Harmon, who had led the Wolverines from 1938 to 1940. Sophomore tailback Tom Kuzma, from Harmon's home town of Gary, Indiana, took over Harmon's spot and scored two touchdowns in his first game for the Wolverines. Michigan State took the lead on the third play from scrimmage with a 74-yard sweep around left end by halfback Jack Fenton. Michigan came back with a touchdown in the second quarter and two more in the third quarter. In addition to Kuzma's two touchdowns, fullback Bob Westfall also scored on a one-yard run in the third quarter. Robert Ingalls kicked for one point after touchdown for Michigan. Michigan out-gained Michigan State on the ground with 235 rushing yards to 104 for the Spartans. Wilfrid Smith of the Chicago Tribune wrote that the key to Michigan's victory was its veteran line that "completely outplayed" the Spartans' line.

Michigan's starting lineup against Michigan State was Harlin Fraumann (left end), Al Wistert (left tackle), Robert Kolesar (left guard), Ingalls (center), Bill Melzow (right guard), Reuben Kelto (right tackle), Joe Rogers (right end), George Ceithaml (quarterback), David M. Nelson (left halfback), Harold "Tippy" Lockard (right halfback), and Westfall (fullback).

=== Week 2: Iowa ===
Week 2: Iowa at Michigan

Team	1	2	3	4	Total
Iowa	0	0	0	0	0
• Michigan	6	0	0	0	6

- Date: October 4, 1941
- Location: Michigan Stadium
  Ann Arbor, Michigan
- Game attendance: 29,909
- Referee: Mike Layden (Notre Dame)

On October 4, 1941, Michigan defeated Iowa by a 6 to 0 score. The game's only points were scored in the first quarter after sophomore halfback Tom Kuzma returned a punt 22 yards, supported by a key block from quarterback George Ceithaml, to Iowa's 18-yard line. Kuzma thereafter scored the touchdown on a three-yard run, and Bill Melzow missed the kick for point after touchdown.

Michigan's starting lineup against Iowa was Harlin Fraumann (left end), Al Wistert (left tackle), Robert Kolesar (left guard), Robert Ingalls (center), Melzow (right guard), Reuben Kelto (right tackle), Joe Rogers (right end), Ceithaml (quarterback), Kuzma (left halfback), Harold "Tippy" Lockard (right halfback), and Bob Westfall (fullback).

=== Week 3: Pittsburgh ===
Week 3: Pittsburgh at Michigan

Team	1	2	3	4	Total
Pitt	0	0	0	0	0
• Michigan	6	0	14	20	40

- Date: October 11, 1941
- Location: Michigan Stadium
  Ann Arbor, Michigan
- Game attendance: 34,403
- Referee: Frank Lane (Cincinnati)

On October 11, 1941, Michigan defeated Pitt by a 40 to 0 score. The game was the first played between the two programs. Michigan's six touchdowns, five of them in the second half, were scored by Harold "Tippy" Lockard, Tom Kuzma (two touchdowns, including a 48-yard punt return), Donald Boor, Don Robinson, and David M. Nelson. Points after touchdown were kicked by Robert Ingalls (2) and William Melzow (2). Pitt never advanced beyond Michigan's 35-yard line in the game. Michigan outgained Pitt on the ground 274 yards to 27 yards. The New York Times wrote: "A powerhouse line, impregnable on the defense and a juggernaut on the offense; an abundance of ball-carriers who possessed speed, force and deception, plus the knowledge of how and when to employ these weapons, stamped Michigan's superiority throughout."

Michigan's starting lineup against Pitt was Harlin Fraumann (left end), Al Wistert (left tackle), Robert Kolesar (left guard), Ingalls (center), Merv Pregulman (right guard), Reuben Kelto (right tackle), Joe Rogers (right end), George Ceithaml (quarterback), Kuzma (left halfback), Lockard (right halfback), and Bob Westfall (fullback).

=== Week 4: at Northwestern ===
Week 4: Michigan at Northwestern

Team	1	2	3	4	Total
• Michigan	7	0	0	7	14
Northwestern	0	7	0	0	7

- Date: October 18, 1941
- Location: Dyche Stadium, Evanston, Illinois
- Referee: W. A. Blake (Loras)

On October 18, 1941, Michigan defeated Northwestern by a 14 to 7 score. Both Michigan touchdowns came on passes from halfback Tom Kuzma. The first touchdown pass, in the first quarter, came on a 78-yard drive led by the running of fullback Bob Westfall. The touchdown was scored on a trick play as Westfall faked a run from Northwestern's 10-yard line, handed the ball to quarterback George Ceithaml who then lateraled the ball to halfback Tom Kuzma who threw to end Harlin Fraumann in the end zone. The second touchdown pass, in the fourth quarter, covered 47 yards, with end Joe Rogers running the final 32 yards after making the reception. Bill Melzow kicked both points after touchdown for the Wolverines. Northwestern's touchdown was scored on a three-yard run by Otto Graham in the second quarter. Michigan was out-gained both on the ground (169 to 128) and in the air (197 to 73), but held Northwestern to a single touchdown.

Michigan's starting lineup against Northwestern was Fraumann (left end), Al Wistert (left tackle), Robert Kolesar (left guard), Robert Ingalls (center), Merv Pregulman (right guard), Reuben Kelto (right tackle), Rogers (right end), Ceithaml (quarterback), Kuzma (left halfback), Harold "Tippy" Lockard (right halfback), and Westfall (fullback).

=== Week 5: Minnesota ===
Week 5: Minnesota at Michigan

Team	1	2	3	4	Total
• Minnesota	0	7	0	0	7
Michigan	0	0	0	00	0

- Date: October 25, 1941
- Location: Michigan Stadium
  Ann Arbor, Michigan
- Game attendance: 85,753
- Referee: Frank Birch

On October 25, 1941, Michigan, ranked No. 3 in the AP Poll, played Minnesota, ranked No. 1 in the country. Minnesota won the game by a 7 to 0 score on a five-yard touchdown run by halfback Herman Frickey in the second quarter. The touchdown was set up by a 78-yard punt and a 43-yard pass, both by 1941 Heisman Trophy winner Bruce Smith. Minnesota gained 179 rushing yards in the game, while Michigan tallied 135 rushing yards. In the fourth quarter, Michigan twice drove deep into Minnesota territory, but both drives ended with pass interceptions by Minnesota's quarterback Bill Garnaas. The loss was the eighth in a row for the Wolverines against the Golden Gophers. The crowd of 85,753 at Michigan Stadium was the largest to that date to see a football game between two Big Ten Conference teams.

Michigan's starting lineup against Minnesota was Harlin Fraumann (left end), Al Wistert (left tackle), Robert Kolesar (left guard), Robert Ingalls (center), Merv Pregulman (right guard), Reuben Kelto (right tackle), Joe Rogers (right end), George Ceithaml (quarterback), Tom Kuzma (left halfback), Harold "Tippy" Lockard (right halfback), and Bob Westfall (fullback).

=== Week 6: at Illinois ===
Week 6: Michigan at Illinois

Team	1	2	3	4	Total
• Michigan	7	6	0	7	20
Illinois	0	0	0	0	0

- Date: November 1, 1941
- Location: Memorial Stadium, Champaign, Illinois
- Game attendance: 30,101
- Referee: Frank Lane (Cincinnati)

On November 1, 1941, Michigan played on the road and defeated Illinois by a 20 to 0 score. The game, played in cold, windy weather, featured 13 fumbles, seven by Michigan and six by Illinois. Two of Michigan's touchdowns were scored by fullback Bob Westfall, and the third was scored by halfback Tom Kuzma. William Melzow kicked two points after touchdown and missed on a third attempt. Kuzma rushed for 121 yards on 21 carries, and Westfall carried 26 times for 126 rushing yards. In all, the Wolverines out-gained the Illini on the ground 327 yards to 91 yards.

Michigan's starting lineup against Illinois was Harlin Fraumann (left end), Al Wistert (left tackle), Robert Kolesar (left guard), Robert Ingalls (center), Merv Pregulman (right guard), Reuben Kelto (right tackle), Rudy Smeja (right end), George Ceithaml (quarterback), Kuzma (left halfback), Paul White (right halfback), and Westfall (fullback).

=== Week 7: at Columbia ===
Week 7: Michigan at Columbia

Team	1	2	3	4	Total
• Michigan	14	7	7	0	28
Columbia	0	0	0	0	0

- Date: November 15, 1941
- Location: Baker Field, New York City
- Game attendance: 35,000

On November 15, 1941, Michigan traveled to New York City and defeated Columbia by a 28 to 0 score. Three of Michigan's four touchdowns were scored by fullback Bob Westfall, and the fourth was scored by halfback Tom Kuzma. All four points after touchdown were kicked by William Melzow. Michigan outgained Columbia on the ground 359 yards to 33 yards. Allison Danzig of The New York Times described Michigan's performance as "butchery" and "a horrendous outpouring of volcanic power" featuring bewildering trickery, "explosive running" and "obliterating blocking", and praised the Wolverines as "one of the greatest football teams ever turned loose" on Columbia's field.

Michigan's starting lineup against Columbia was Harlin Fraumann (left end), Al Wistert (left tackle), Robert Kolesar (left guard), Robert Ingalls (center), Merv Pregulman (right guard), Reuben Kelto (right tackle), Philip Sharpe (right end), George Ceithaml (quarterback), Kuzma (left halfback), Paul White (right halfback), and Westfall (fullback).

=== Week 8: Ohio State ===
Week 8: Ohio State at Michigan

Team	1	2	3	4	Total
Ohio State	7	0	7	6	20
Michigan	0	7	7	6	20

- Date: November 22, 1941
- Location: Michigan Stadium
  Ann Arbor, Michigan
- Game attendance: 85,757
- Referee: Frank Birch

On November 22, 1941, Michigan finished its season playing to a 20 to 20 tie with Ohio State. Michigan's touchdowns were scored by halfback Tom Kuzma (on a one-yard run), end Harlin Fraumann (on a lateral from George Ceithaml to Kuzma, who then passed to Fraumann), and fullback Bob Westfall (on a five-yard run). Westfall gained 162 rushing yards in his final game for Michigan. The Wolverines out-gained the Buckeyes in rushing, 271 yards to 179 yards. Michigan's Bill Melzow kicked two points after touchdown but, in the fourth quarter, kicked wide on the third attempt that would have given Michigan a victory.

Michigan's starting lineup against Minnesota was Fraumann (left end), Al Wistert (left tackle), Robert Kolesar (left guard), Robert Ingalls (center), Merv Pregulman (right guard), Reuben Kelto (right tackle), Philip Sharpe (right end), George Ceithaml (quarterback), Kuzma (left halfback), Paul White (right halfback), and Westfall (fullback).

=== Scoring summary ===
Player	Touchdowns	Extra points	Field goals	Points
Tom Kuzma	8	0	0	48
Bob Westfall	7	0	0	42
Bill Melzow	0	12	0	12
Harlin Fraumann	2	0	0	12
David M. Nelson	1	0	0	6
Don Robinson	1	0	0	6
Donald Boor	1	0	0	6
Harold Lockard	1	0	0	6
Joe Rogers	1	0	0	6
Robert Ingalls	0	3	0	3
Totals	22	15	0	147

=== Post-season ===
On December 1, 1941, the Associated Press released the results of its final football ranking poll of the 1941 season. With 945-1/2 points and 84 of 96 first place votes, the national championship was awarded to Minnesota, the only team to defeat Michigan during the 1941 season. Michigan ranked No. 5 in the final AP Poll with 455 points.

With respect to individual awards, fullback Bob Westfall was the only Wolverine to receive first-team All-America honors. Westfall was a consensus All-American, receiving first-team honors from the All-America Board, Collier's Weekly (selected by Grantland Rice), the International News Service, Liberty magazine, the Newspaper Enterprise Association, Newsweek, the Sporting News, the United Press, the Central Press Association and the Walter Camp Football Foundation. Westfall also received All-Big Ten honors from both the Associated Press and the United Press. (In 1987, Westfall was enshrined in the College Football Hall of Fame.)

Other Wolverines receiving post-season honors included:

- Right tackle Al Wistert received second-team All-America honors from the United Press, Central Press, and Life magazine. He was also selected as the fullback on the national champion Minnesota team's "all-opponent" team.
- Left tackle Reuben Kelto received the team's Most Valuable Player award. After Kelto played 56 of 60 minutes against Illinois in 1941, a writer in the Detroit Free Press wrote: "If ever there was an under-rated football player, it is this 198-pound tackle."
- Center Robert Ingalls was selected by the United Press and the Associated Press as a first-team All-Big Ten player. He was also selected as the center on Minnesota's "all-opponent" team.
- Halfback Tom Kuzma, Michigan's leading scorer, received second-team All-Big Ten honors from the United Press. Kuzma ranked eighth among halfbacks in the United Press' All-America voting, earning "honorable mention" with 144 points. He was also selected as a halfback on Minnesota's "all-opponent" team.
- Guard Merv Pregulman was selected by the United Press as a second-team All-Big Ten player. Pregulman also received the team's Meyer Morton Award, as the player who showed "the greatest development and most promise as a result of the annual spring practice." He was also selected as a guard on Minnesota's "all-opponent" team.
- End Joe Rogers was selected by the Associated Press as a second-team All-Big Ten player.

== Players ==
=== Varsity letter winners ===
Twenty-five players received varsity letters for their participation on the 1941 Michigan team. The letter winners were:

- Donald P. Boor, Dearborn, Michigan – fullback
- George Ceithaml – started 8 games at quarterback
- Leo P. Cunningham, Revere, Massachusetts – tackle
- Robert L. Flora, Muskegon, Michigan – tackle
- Julius Franks, Hamtramck, Michigan – guard
- Harlin E. Fraumann – started 8 games at left end
- Robert Ingalls – started 8 games at center
- Jack Karwales, Chicago – end
- Reuben Kelto – started 8 games at right tackle
- Theodore Kennedy, Jr., Saginaw, Michigan – center
- Robert Kolesar – started 8 games at left guard
- Tom Kuzma – started 7 games at left halfback
- John T. Laine, Puritan, Michigan – guard
- Harold "Tippy" Lockard – started 5 games at right halfback
- Elmer Madar, Detroit – quarterback
- William "Bill" Melzow – started 2 games at right guard
- David M. Nelson – started 1 game at left halfback
- Merv Pregulman – started 6 games at right guard
- Don Robinson, Detroit – halfback
- Joe Rogers – started 5 games at right end
- Philip E. Sharpe – started 2 games at right end
- Rudy Smeja – started 1 game at right end
- Bob Westfall – started 8 games at fullback
- Paul White – started 3 games at right halfback
- Albert Wistert – started 8 games at left tackle

=== Other players ===
Other players included on Michigan's 1941 roster include the following:

- John G. Allerdice, halfback, Indianapolis
- Ralph H. Amstutz, guard, Oak Park, Illinois
- Harry F. Anderson, guard, Chicago
- James J. Brown, halfback, St. Ignace, Michigan
- Norman D. Call, halfback, Norwalk, Ohio
- Harrison H. Caswell, tackle, Ann Arbor, Michigan
- Otto E. Chady, end, Highland Park, Mich.
- Fred Dawley, quarterback, Detroit, Michigan
- Theodore E. Denise, tackle, Lansing, Michigan
- Walter B. Freihofer, end, Indianapolis
- John J. Greene, quarterback, Pittsburgh
- James Grissen, fullback, Holland, Michigan
- John F. Harrigan, quarterback, Detroit MI
- Charles J. Haslam, quarterback, Duluth, Minnesota
- George H. Hildebrandt, tackle, Hamburg, New York
- Joseph Joseph, fullback, Highland Park, Michigan
- Charles F. Kennedy, halfback, Van Wert, Ohio
- William E. Kuyper, tackle, Newtonville, Massachusetts
- William M. MacConnachie, end, Upper Mt. Clair, New Jersey
- William J. MacDougall, tackle, Highland Park, Michigan
- Robert L. McFaddin, center, Detroit
- Austin S. Miller, fullback, Mt. Pleasant, Michigan
- Robert L. Morrison, halfback, Minocqua, Wisconsin
- Jack Petoskey, end, Dearborn, Michigan
- Bill Pritula, center, Detroit
- Reino J. Romo, halfback, Bessemer, Michigan
- Vincent C. Secontine, tackle, Detroit
- Robert W. Shemky, end, Crystal Falls, Michigan
- Ray B. Sowers, halfback, Bay City, Michigan
- Robert P. Stenberg, fullback, Chicago
- Alfred S. Thomas, halfback, Detroit
- Angelo E. Trogan, guard, Saginaw, Michigan
- Clifford C. Wise, halfback, Grand Haven, Michigan
- Louis K. Woytek, center

=== Awards and honors ===
- All-Americans: Bob Westfall
- All-Conference: Robert Ingalls, Bob Westfall
- Most Valuable Player: Reuben Kelto
- Meyer Morton Award: Merv Pregulman

== Coaching and training staff ==
- Head coach: Fritz Crisler
- Assistant coaches:
  - Backfield: Earl Martineau, assisted by Hercules Renda
  - Linemen: Biggie Munn, assisted by Archie Kodros
  - Freshmen: Wally Weber, assisted by former Michigan fullback Howard "Jeep" Mehaffey
  - Other assistant coaches: Cliff Keen (head wrestling coach and asst. football coach), Ernest McCoy (head basketball coach and asst. football coach), and Bennie Oosterbaan (head basketball coach and asst. football coach)
- Manager: William L. Hurley, assisted by Edward K. Aldworth, James D. Kline, Howard F. DeYoung, and Albert L. Gruenewald
