= 1941 Big Ten Conference football season =

- Sport: Football
- Number of teams: 9
- Top draft pick: Bob Westfall
- Champion: Minnesota
- Season MVP: Jack Graf

Football seasons
- ← 1940 1942 →

1941 Big Ten Conference football standings
	Conf.					Overall
Team	W		L		T	W		L		T
No. 1 Minnesota $	5	–	0	–	0	8	–	0	–	0
No. 5 Michigan	3	–	1	–	1	6	–	1	–	1
No. 13 Ohio State	3	–	1	–	1	6	–	1	–	1
No. 11 Northwestern	4	–	2	–	0	5	–	3	–	0
Wisconsin	3	–	3	–	0	3	–	5	–	0
Iowa	2	–	4	–	0	3	–	5	–	0
Purdue	1	–	3	–	0	2	–	5	–	1
Indiana	1	–	3	–	0	2	–	6	–	0
Illinois	0	–	5	–	0	2	–	6	–	0
$ – Conference champion; Rankings from AP Poll

The 1941 Big Ten Conference football season was the 46th season of college football played by the member schools of the Big Ten Conference (also known as the Western Conference) and was a part of the 1941 college football season.

The 1941 Minnesota Golden Gophers football team, led by head coach Bernie Bierman, compiled a perfect 8–0 record, led the conference in both scoring offense and scoring defense, was ranked No. 1 in the final AP Poll, and won the program's second consecutive national championship. Halfback Bruce Smith was a consensus All-American and won the 1941 Heisman Trophy. Tackle Dick Wildung was also a consensus first-team All-American.

Michigan, under head coach Fritz Crisler, compiled a 6–1–1 record, outscored opponents 147 to 41, and was ranked No. 5 in the final AP Poll. Fullback Bob Westfall was selected as a consensus first-team player on the 1941 College Football All-America Team. In addition to Westfall, two other Michigan players received first-team honors on the 1941 All-Big Ten Conference football team: center Robert Ingalls and tackle Al Wistert.

Ohio State, under head coach Paul Brown, compiled a 6–1–1 record, outscored opponents 167 to 110, and was ranked No. 13 in the final AP Poll. In the Chicago Tribune's poll of coaches, officials and experts, Ohio State fullback Jack Graf was selected as the Big Ten's most valuable player.

Northwestern lost to three top 10 teams (Minnesota, Michigan, and Notre Dame) and was ranked No. 11 in the final AP Poll. Two Northwestern players received first-team honors on the All-Big Ten team: tackle Alf Bauman and end Bob Motl. The team also featured halfback Otto Graham who was later inducted into the Pro and College Football Halls of Fame.

== Season overview ==
=== Results and team statistics ===
Conf. Rank	Team	Head coach	AP final	AP high	Overall record	Conf. record	PPG	PAG	MVP
1	Minnesota	Bernie Bierman	#1	#1	8–0	5–0	**23.3**	**4.8**	Bob Sweiger
2 (tie)	Michigan	Fritz Crisler	#5	#3	6–1–1	3–1–1	18.4	5.1	Reuben Kelto
2 (tie)	Ohio State	Paul Brown	#13	#10	6–1–1	3–1–1	20.0	13.8	Jack Graf
4	Northwestern	Pappy Waldorf	#11	#5	5–3	4–2	21.6	8.4	Alf Bauman
5	Wisconsin	Harry Stuhldreher	NR	NR	3–5	3–3	18.0	26.0	Pat Harder
6	Iowa	Eddie Anderson	NR	NR	3–5	2–4	11.4	12.4	Bill Diehl
7 (tie)	Purdue	Mal Elward	NR	NR	2–5–1	1–3	3.4	7.8	Bill Combs
7 (tie)	Indiana	Bo McMillin	NR	NR	2–6	1–3	12.6	15.8	Billy Hillenbrand
9	Illinois	Robert Zuppke	NR	NR	2–6	0–5	14.0	20.4	Nathan Johnson

Key
PPG = Average of points scored per game
PAG = Average of points allowed per game
MVP = Most valuable player as voted by players on each team as part of the voting process to determine the winner of the Chicago Tribune Silver Football trophy

=== Regular season ===
Index to colors and formatting
Non-conference matchup; Big Ten member won
Non-conference matchup; Big Ten member lost
Conference matchup
Winning teams displayed in **bold**
**Result** column from perspective of Big Ten school for non-conference
games, from perspective of winning team for conference games

==== September 27 ====
Six conference teams opened their seasons on September 27, playing six games against non-conference opponents, resulting in four wins and two losses. Northwestern, Wisconsin and Illinois did not play.

Date	Home team	Visiting team	Site	Result	Attendance	Source
September 27	Washington	**Minnesota**	Husky Stadium, Seattle, WA	**W** 14–6	43,000	
September 27	**Michigan**	Michigan State	Michigan Stadium, Ann Arbor, MI	**W** 19–7	67,079	
September 27	**Ohio State**	Missouri	Ohio Stadium, Columbus, OH	**W** 12–7	49,671	
September 27	**Iowa**	Drake	Iowa Stadium, Iowa City, IA	**W** 25–8	20,000	
September 27	Purdue	**Vanderbilt**	Ross–Ade Stadium, West Lafayette, IN	**L** 0–3	17,000	
September 27	Indiana	**Detroit**	Memorial Stadium, Bloomington, IN	**L** 7–14	10,000	

==== October 4 ====
Eight conference teams played games on October 4, consisting of one conference matchup and six non-conference games. The non-conference games resulted in four wins and two losses. Minnesota did not play.

Date	Home team	Visiting team	Site	Result	Attendance	Source
October 4	**Michigan**	Iowa	Michigan Stadium, Ann Arbor, MI	**W** 6–0	29,807	
October 4	USC	**Ohio State**	Los Angeles Memorial Coliseum, Los Angeles, CA	**W** 33–0	65,000	
October 4	**Northwestern**	Kansas State	Dyche Stadium, Evanston, IL	**W** 51–3	40,000	
October 4	Wisconsin	**Marquette**	Camp Randall Stadium, Madison, WI	L 7-28	40,000	
October 4	Pittsburgh	**Purdue**	Pitt Stadium, Pittsburgh, PA	**W** 6-0	24,000	
October 4	**Notre Dame**	Indiana	Notre Dame Stadium, South Bend, IN	**L** 6-19	42,000	
October 4	**Illinois**	Miami (OH)	Memorial Stadium, Champaign, IL	**W** 45-0	20,585	

==== October 11 ====
Six conference teams played games on October 11, consisting of two conference matchups and two non-conference games. The non-conference games resulted in a win and a loss. Ohio State, Iowa, and Purdue did not play. After three weeks, Big Ten teams had compiled a non-conference record of 9–4.

Date	Home team	Visiting team	Site	Result	Attendance	Source
October 11	**Minnesota**	Illinois	Memorial Stadium, Minneapolis, MN	**W** 34–6	50,435	
October 11	**Michigan**	Pittsburgh	Michigan Stadium, Ann Arbor, MI	**W** 40–0	34,403	
October 11	**Northwestern**	Wisconsin	Dyche Stadium, Evanston, IL	**W** 41–14	40,000	
October 11	Indiana	**TCU**	Memorial Stadium, Bloomington, IN	**L** 14–20	24,000	

==== October 18 ====
All nine conference teams saw action on October 18, consisting of three conference games and three non-conference games. In the week's biggest matchup, No. 6 Michigan defeated No. 5 Northwestern. The non-conference games resulted in three wins. After four weeks, Big Ten teams had compiled a non-conference record of 12–4.

Date	Home team	Visiting team	Site	Result	Attendance	Source
October 18	No. 1 **Minnesota**	Pittsburgh	Memorial Stadium, Minneapolis, MN	**W** 39–0	35,000	
October 18	No. 5 Northwestern	No. 6 **Michigan**	Dyche Stadium, Evanston, IL	**W** 14-7	47,000	
October 18	No. 10 **Ohio State**	Purdue	Ohio Stadium, Columbus, OH	**W** 16–14	66,074	
October 18	**Wisconsin**	Iowa	Camp Randall Stadium, Madison, WI	**W** 23–0	20,000	
October 18	No. 15 Nebraska	**Indiana**	Memorial Stadium, Lincoln, NE	**W** 21–13	33,000	
October 18	**Illinois**	Drake	Memorial Stadium, Champaign, IL	**W** 40–0	12,000	

==== October 25 ====
All nine conference teams saw action on October 25, consisting of four conference games and one non-conference game. In the week's biggest matchups, No. 1 Minnesota defeated No. 3 Michigan, and No. 13 Northwestern defeated No. 11 Ohio State. The non-conference game resulted in three wins. After five weeks, Big Ten teams had compiled a non-conference record of 12–5.

Date	Home team	Visiting team	Site	Result	Attendance	Source
October 25	No. 3 Michigan	No. 1 **Minnesota**	Michigan Stadium, Ann Arbor, MI	**W** 7–0	85,753	
October 25	No. 11 Ohio State	No. 13 **Northwestern**	Ohio Stadium, Columbus, OH	**W** 14–7	71,896	
October 25	**Wisconsin**	Indiana	Camp Randall Stadium, Madison, WI	**W** 27–25	33,000	
October 25	**Purdue**	Iowa	Ross–Ade Stadium, West Lafayette, IN	**W** 7–6	22,000	
October 25	No. 7 **Notre Dame**	Illinois	Notre Dame Stadium, South Bend, IN	**L** 14–49	45,000	

==== November 1 ====
All nine conference teams saw action on November 1, consisting of three conference games and three non-conference games. In the week's biggest matchup, No. 1 Minnesota defeated No. 9 Northwestern. The non-conference games resulted in one win and two losses. After six weeks, Big Ten teams had compiled a non-conference record of 13–7.

Date	Home team	Visiting team	Site	Result	Attendance	Source
November 1	No. 1 **Minnesota**	No. 9 Northwestern	Memorial Stadium, Minneapolis, MN	**W** 8–7	64,464	
November 1	Illinois	No. 7 **Michigan**	Memorial Stadium, Champaign, IL	**W** 20–0	30,101	
November 1	Pittsburgh	**Ohio State**	Pitt Stadium, Pittsburgh, PA	**W** 21–14	50,000	
November 1	Wisconsin	**Syracuse**	Camp Randall Stadium, Madison, WI	**L** 20–27	19,000	
November 1	**Iowa**	Indiana	Iowa Stadium, Iowa City, IA	**W** 13–7	28,000	
November 1	No. 3 **Fordham**	Purdue	Polo Grounds, New York, NY	**L** 0–17	20,500	

==== November 8 ====
Eight conference teams played games on November 8, consisting of three conference games and two non-conference games. The non-conference games resulted in a win and a tie. After seven weeks, Big Ten teams had compiled a non-conference record of 14–7–1. Michigan did not play.

Date	Home team	Visiting team	Site	Result	Attendance	Source
November 8	No. 2 **Minnesota**	Nebraska	Memorial Stadium, Minneapolis, MN	W 9–0	42,893	
November 8	No. 20 **Ohio State**	Wisconsin	Ohio Stadium, Columbus, OH	**W** 46–34	58,519	
November 8	No. 10 **Northwestern**	Indiana	Dyche Stadium, Evanston, IL	**W** 20–14	35,000	
November 8	Illinois	**Iowa**	Memorial Stadium, Champaign, IL	**W** 21–0	14,339	
November 8	Purdue	Michigan State	Ross–Ade Stadium, West Lafayette, IN	**T** 0–0	17,000	

==== November 15 ====
Eight conference teams played games on November 15, consisting of three conference games and two non-conference games. The non-conference games resulted in a win and a loss. In the week's biggest matchup, No. 5 Notre Dame defeated No. 8 Northwestern. After eight weeks, Big Ten teams had compiled a non-conference record of 15–8–1. Indiana did not play.

Date	Home team	Visiting team	Site	Result	Attendance	Source
November 15	Iowa	No. 1 **Minnesota**	Iowa Stadium, Iowa City, IA (rivalry)	**W** 34–13	43,200	
November 15	Columbia	No. 7 **Michigan**	Baker Field, New York, NY	**W** 28–0	35,000	
November 15	No. 20 **Ohio State**	Illinois	Ohio Stadium, Columbus, OH (Illibuck)	**W** 12–7	41,544	
November 1	No. 8 Northwestern	No. 5 **Notre Dame**	Dyche Stadium, Evanston, IL (rivalry)	**L** 6–7	48,000	
November 15	**Wisconsin**	Purdue	Camp Randall Stadium, Madison, WI	**W** 13–0	25,000	

==== November 22 ====
All nine conference teams played games on November 22, consisting of four conference games and one non-conference game. In the week's biggest matchup, No. 7 Michigan played No. 14 Ohio State to a 20–20 tie. The non-conference game resulted in a loss. Big Ten teams finished the season with a non-conference record of 15–9–1.

Date	Home team	Visiting team	Site	Result	Attendance	Source
November 22	No. 1 **Minnesota**	Wisconsin	Memorial Stadium, Minneapolis, MN (Slab of Bacon)	**W** 41–6	52,984	
November 22	No. 7 Michigan	No. 14 Ohio State	Michigan Stadium, Ann Arbor, MI (rivalry)	**T** 20–20	85,753	
November 22	No. 10 **Northwestern**	Illinois	Dyche Stadium, Evanston, IL (rivalry)	**W** 27–0	5,000	
November 1	**Nebraska**	Iowa	Memorial Stadium, Lincoln, NE (rivalry)	**L** 13–14	20,000	
November 22	**Indiana**	Purdue	Memorial Stadium, Bloomington, IN (Old Oaken Bucket)	**W** 7–0	23,000	

=== Bowl games ===
During the 1941 season, the Big Ten maintained its long-standing ban on postseason games. Accordingly, no Big Ten teams participated in any bowl games.

== All-Big Ten players ==
The following players were picked by the Associated Press (AP), the United Press (UP), and/or the International News Service (INS) as first-team players on the 1941 All-Big Ten Conference football team.

- Dave Schreiner, end, Wisconsin (AP, UP, INS)
- Bob Motl, end, Northwestern (AP, INS)
- Bob Fitch, end, Minnesota (UP)
- Alf Bauman, tackle, Northwestern (AP, UP, INS)
- Dick Wildung, tackle, Minnesota (AP, UP, INS)
- Tom Melton, guard, Purdue (AP, UP)
- Len Levy, guard, Minnesota (AP, UP)
- Al Wistert, guard, Michigan (INS)
- Fritz Howard, guard, Ohio State (INS)
- Robert Ingalls, center, Michigan (AP, UP)
- Iron Man Bob Johnson, center, Purdue (INS)
- Billy Hillenbrand, quarterback, Indiana (AP, UP, INS)
- Bill Daley, halfback, Minnesota (AP, UP)
- Bruce Smith, halfback, Minnesota (AP, INS) (1941 Heisman Trophy winner)
- Bob Westfall, fullback, Michigan (AP, UP, INS)
- Pat Harder, fullback, Wisconsin (UP, INS)

== All-Americans ==
At the end of the 1941 season, Big Ten players secured three of the 12 consensus first-team picks for the 1941 College Football All-America Team. The Big Ten's consensus All-Americans were:

- Dick Wildung, tackle, Minnesota (AAB, AP, INS, LIB, NEA, NW, SN, UP, CP, LIFE, PARA, WC)
- Bruce Smith, halfback, Minnesota (AAB, AP, CO, INS, NW, SN, UP, CP, NYS, LIFE, PARA, WC, LIFE)
- Bob Westfall, fullback, Michigan (AAB, CO, INS, LIB, NEA, NW, SN, UP, CP, NYS, PARA, WC)

Other Big Ten players who were named first-team All-Americans by at least one selector were:

- Dave Schreiner, end, Wisconsin (AP)
- Alf Bauman, tackle, Northwestern (AAB, SN, LIFE)
- Jim Daniell, tackle, Ohio State (CP)

== 1942 NFL draft ==
Two Big Ten players, Bob Westfall and Urban Odson, were selected in the first round of the 1942 NFL draft. In all, 26 players from Big Ten football teams were selected in the 1942 NFL Draft, as follows:

Name	Position	Team	Round	Overall pick
Bob Westfall	Fullback	Michigan	1	5
Urban Odson	Tackle	Minnesota	1	9
Alf Bauman	Tackle	Northwestern	2	15
Bob Sweiger	Back	Minnesota	3	23
Len Levy	Guard	Minnesota	4	27
Gordon Paschka	Guard	Minnesota	4	28
Bill Green	Back	Iowa	5	39
Italo Rossi	Tackle	Purdue	7	52
Bob Fitch	End	Minnesota	7	56
Joe Rogers	End	Michigan	8	59
John Petty	Back	Purdue	9	80
Jud Ringer	End	Minnesota	10	84
Bill Diehl	Center	Iowa	10	85
Gene Flick	Center	Minnesota	10	89
Tom Farris	Back	Wisconsin	11	99
Jim Daniell	Tackle	Ohio State	12	110
Bruce Smith	Back	Minnesota	13	119
Bill DeCorrevont	Back	Northwestern	14	126
Jim Trimble	Tackle	Indiana	15	139
Tom Kinkade	Back	Ohio State	16	149
Don Clawson	Back	Northwestern	17	152
Dick Fisher	Back	Ohio State	17	155
Jack Graf	Back	Ohio State	18	162
Robert Ingalls	Center	Michigan	18	169
George Benson	Back	Northwestern	19	179
Al Couppee	Back	Iowa	22	196
