= 1941 Ohio State Buckeyes football team =

American college football season

1941 Ohio State Buckeyes football
- Conference: Big Ten Conference

Ranking
- AP: No. 13
- Record: 6–1–1 (3–1–1 Big Ten)
- Head coach: Paul Brown (1st season)
- MVP: Jack Graf
- Home stadium: Ohio Stadium

1941 Big Ten Conference football standings
	Conf.					Overall
Team	W		L		T	W		L		T
No. 1 Minnesota $	5	–	0	–	0	8	–	0	–	0
No. 5 Michigan	3	–	1	–	1	6	–	1	–	1
No. 13 Ohio State	3	–	1	–	1	6	–	1	–	1
No. 11 Northwestern	4	–	2	–	0	5	–	3	–	0
Wisconsin	3	–	3	–	0	3	–	5	–	0
Iowa	2	–	4	–	0	3	–	5	–	0
Purdue	1	–	3	–	0	2	–	5	–	1
Indiana	1	–	3	–	0	2	–	6	–	0
Illinois	0	–	5	–	0	2	–	6	–	0
$ – Conference champion; Rankings from AP Poll

The 1941 Ohio State Buckeyes football team was an American football team that represented Ohio State University in the 1941 Big Ten Conference football season. The Buckeyes compiled a 6–1–1 record and outscored opponents 167–110. In Paul Brown's first season as head coach, the Buckeyes tied Michigan. The season opening game versus Missouri was the debut of the Split-T offense, developed by Tigers' coach Don Faurot.

== Schedule ==
Date	Opponent	Rank	Site	Result	Attendance	Source
September 27	Missouri*		Ohio Stadium; Columbus, OH	W 12–7	49,671	
October 4	at USC*		Los Angeles Memorial Coliseum; Los Angeles, CA	W 33–0	65,000	
October 18	Purdue	No. 10	Ohio Stadium; Columbus, OH	W 16–14	66,074	
October 25	No. 13 Northwestern	No. 11	Ohio Stadium; Columbus, OH	L 7–14	71,896	
November 1	at Pittsburgh*		Pitt Stadium; Pittsburgh, PA	W 21–14	50,000	
November 8	Wisconsin	No. 20	Ohio Stadium; Columbus, OH	W 46–34	58,519	
November 15	Illinois^{†}	No. 20	Ohio Stadium; Columbus, OH (Illibuck)	W 12–7	41,544	
November 22	at No. 5 Michigan	No. 14	Michigan Stadium; Ann Arbor, MI (rivalry)	T 20–20	85,753	
*Non-conference game; ^{†}Homecoming; Rankings from AP Poll released prior to the game

== Rankings ==
Ranking movements Legend: ██ Increase in ranking ██ Decrease in ranking — = Not ranked ( ) = First-place votes
	Week							
Poll	1	2	3	4	5	6	7	Final
AP	10 (1)	11 (1)	—	20	20	14	15	13

== Coaching staff ==
- Paul Brown, head coach, first year

== 1942 NFL draftees ==
Player	Round	Pick	Position	NFL club
Jim Daniell	12	110	Tackle	Chicago Bears
Tom Kinkade	16	149	Back	Green Bay Packers
Dick Fisher	17	155	Back	Detroit Lions
Jack Graf	18	162	Back	Cleveland Rams
