= 1941 Northwestern Wildcats football team =

American college football season

1941 Northwestern Wildcats football
- Conference: Big Ten Conference

Ranking
- AP: No. 11
- Record: 5–3 (4–2 Big Ten)
- Head coach: Pappy Waldorf (7th season)
- Offensive scheme: Single-wing
- MVP: Alf Bauman
- Captain: Floyd Chambers
- Home stadium: Dyche Stadium

1941 Big Ten Conference football standings
	Conf.					Overall
Team	W		L		T	W		L		T
No. 1 Minnesota $	5	–	0	–	0	8	–	0	–	0
No. 5 Michigan	3	–	1	–	1	6	–	1	–	1
No. 13 Ohio State	3	–	1	–	1	6	–	1	–	1
No. 11 Northwestern	4	–	2	–	0	5	–	3	–	0
Wisconsin	3	–	3	–	0	3	–	5	–	0
Iowa	2	–	4	–	0	3	–	5	–	0
Purdue	1	–	3	–	0	2	–	5	–	1
Indiana	1	–	3	–	0	2	–	6	–	0
Illinois	0	–	5	–	0	2	–	6	–	0
$ – Conference champion; Rankings from AP Poll

The 1941 Northwestern Wildcats team was an American football team that represented Northwestern University as a member of the Big Ten Conference during the 1941 Big Ten Conference football season. In their seventh year under head coach Pappy Waldorf, the Wildcats compiled a 5–3 record (4–2 against conference opponents) and finished in fourth place in the Big Ten.

Four Northwestern players received honors on the 1941 All-Big Ten Conference football team: tackle Alf Bauman (AP-1; UP-1); end Bob Motl (AP-1; UP-2); halfback Otto Graham (AP-2); and guard George Zorich (UP-2).

== Schedule ==
Date	Opponent	Rank	Site	Result	Attendance	Source
October 4	Kansas State*		Dyche Stadium; Evanston, IL	W 51–3	40,000	
October 11	Wisconsin		Dyche Stadium; Evanston, IL	W 41–14	40,000	
October 18	No. 6 Michigan	No. 5	Dyche Stadium; Evanston, IL (rivalry)	L 7–14	47,000	
October 25	at No. 11 Ohio State	No. 13	Ohio Stadium; Columbus, OH	W 14–7	71,896	
November 1	at No. 1 Minnesota	No. 9	Memorial Stadium; Minneapolis, MN	L 7–8	64,464	
November 8	Indiana	No. 10	Dyche Stadium; Evanston, IL	W 20–14	35,000	
November 15	No. 5 Notre Dame*	No. 8	Dyche Stadium; Evanston, IL (rivalry)	L 6–7	48,000	
November 22	Illinois	No. 10	Dyche Stadium; Evanston, IL (rivalry)	W 27–0	26,000	
*Non-conference game; Rankings from AP Poll released prior to the game

== Rankings ==
Ranking movements Legend: ██ Increase in ranking ██ Decrease in ranking ( ) = First-place votes
	Week							
Poll	1	2	3	4	5	6	7	Final
AP	5 (1)	13	9	10	8	10	9	11
