= Robert Kolesar =

American football player and coach

- Kolesar at the University of Michigan

No. 68, 38, 37
- Position: Guard

Personal information
- Born: April 5, 1921; Cleveland, Ohio, U.S.
- Died: January 13, 2004 (aged 82); Midland, Michigan, U.S.
- Listed height: 5 ft 10 in (1.78 m)
- Listed weight: 200 lb (91 kg)

Career information
- High school: John Adams
- College: Michigan
- NFL draft: 1943: 12th round, 101st overall pick

Career history
- Cleveland Browns (1946)

Awards and highlights
- AAFC champion (1946)

Career AAFC statistics
- Games: 2
- Stats at Pro Football Reference

Robert C. Kolesar (April 5, 1921 – January 13, 2004) was an American football player and medical doctor. He played at the guard position for the University of Michigan from 1940 to 1942 and for the Cleveland Browns in 1946 after a stint in the U.S. Army during World War II. While playing at Michigan, he was part of a line that was known as the "Seven Oak Posts".

Kolesar retired from professional football after one season to pursue a medical career, and later established a practice in Saginaw, Michigan. He died in 2004.

== College career ==
A native of Cleveland, Ohio, Kolesar attended John Adams High School before graduating and enrolling at the University of Michigan.

At Michigan, Kolesar played at the guard position for Fritz Crisler's Michigan Wolverines football teams from 1940 to 1942. The 1942 Wolverines' line, which included Kolesar, Julius Franks, Al Wistert, Merv Pregulman, and Elmer Madar, became known as the "Seven Oak Posts". They got the nickname because substitutions were rare for the seven players who formed the Michigan line. One account of the "Seven Oak Posts" noted:

Michigan's 1942 line had assumed the nickname, the "Seven Oak Posts", and started the same men each week; the only rest the seven enjoyed coming in the second half of the Harvard game. Soon the two platoon era at Michigan and everywhere else would doom demonstrations of this kind of gridiron endurance. But these Wolverines offered many a thrill.

Kolesar was a medical student at Michigan, and a news story about him in October 1942 ran under the headline, "A Maulin' Medical Man." At the end of the 1942 season, Kolesar and Michigan quarterback George Ceithaml were invited to compete in the annual Blue and Gray Game at Montgomery, Alabama.

== Professional career ==
In 1943, Kolesar enlisted in the U.S. Army, but remained at the University of Michigan as a medical student. Although he had an additional year of eligibility under the wartime NCAA rules, the Army ruled that its trainees were too busy to play college football. He was drafted 101st overall by the Detroit Lions in the 12th round of the 1943 NFL draft with the 101st overall pick. After being ruled ineligible for college football, Kolesar signed with the Detroit Lions in September 1943. Kolesar said at the time that he would continue his medical studies while playing for the Lions; he said he would be able to practice three days a week and would be available for weekend games. Kolesar, however, did not appear in any games for the Lions in the 1943 NFL season, and in August 1944 he was selected to play against the Chicago Bears in the College All-Star Game, a now-defunct matchup between the NFL champions and the country's best college players.

In February 1946, after completing his military service, Kolesar signed to play with Paul Brown's newly organized Cleveland Browns football team. Kolesar played for the Browns in their 1946 inaugural season in the All-America Football Conference. The team won the AAFC championship that year.

== Later life and medical career ==
After one season with the Browns, Kolesar elected to return to medical school at the University of Michigan. He later went into private practice as a physician in Saginaw, Michigan.

Kolesar's son, Thomas, played football at Princeton University. Kolesar died in 2004 at age 82 while living in Midland, Michigan.
