= 1941 Wisconsin Badgers football team =

American college football season

1941 Wisconsin Badgers football
- Conference: Big Ten Conference
- Record: 3–5 (3–3 Big Ten)
- Head coach: Harry Stuhldreher (6th season)
- MVP: Pat Harder
- Captain: Tom Farris
- Home stadium: Camp Randall Stadium

1941 Big Ten Conference football standings
	Conf.					Overall
Team	W		L		T	W		L		T
No. 1 Minnesota $	5	–	0	–	0	8	–	0	–	0
No. 5 Michigan	3	–	1	–	1	6	–	1	–	1
No. 13 Ohio State	3	–	1	–	1	6	–	1	–	1
No. 11 Northwestern	4	–	2	–	0	5	–	3	–	0
Wisconsin	3	–	3	–	0	3	–	5	–	0
Iowa	2	–	4	–	0	3	–	5	–	0
Purdue	1	–	3	–	0	2	–	5	–	1
Indiana	1	–	3	–	0	2	–	6	–	0
Illinois	0	–	5	–	0	2	–	6	–	0
$ – Conference champion; Rankings from AP Poll

The 1941 Wisconsin Badgers football team was an American football team that represented the University of Wisconsin in the 1941 Big Ten Conference football season. The team compiled a 3–5 record (3–3 against conference opponents) and finished in fifth place in the Big Ten Conference. Harry Stuhldreher was in his sixth year as Wisconsin's head coach.

Wisconsin players led the Big Ten in rushing (Pat Harder, 443 rushing yards), passing (Len Seelinger, 419 passing yards), receiving (Dave Schreiner, 249 receiving yards), and scoring (Harder, 58 points). Schreiner was selected by the Associated Press (AP) as a first-team All-American. Schreiner and Harder both received first-team All-Big Ten honors. Harder received the team's most valuable player award. Quarterback Tom Farris was the team captain.

Wisconsin was ranked at No. 57 (out of 681 teams) in the final rankings under the Litkenhous Difference by Score System for 1941.

The team played its home games at Camp Randall Stadium. During the 1941 season, the average attendance at home games was 26,212.

== Schedule ==
Date	Opponent	Site	Result	Attendance	Source
October 4	Marquette*	Camp Randall Stadium; Madison, WI	L 7–28	40,000	
October 11	at Northwestern	Dyche Stadium; Evanston, IL	L 14–41	40,000	
October 18	Iowa	Camp Randall Stadium; Madison, WI (rivalry)	W 23–0	20,000	
October 25	Indiana^{†}	Camp Randall Stadium; Madison, WI	W 27–25	33,000	
November 1	Syracuse*	Camp Randall Stadium; Madison, WI	L 20–27	19,000	
November 8	at No. 20 Ohio State	Ohio Stadium; Columbus, OH	L 34–46	58,519	
November 15	Purdue	Camp Randall Stadium; Madison, WI	W 13–0	25,000	
November 22	at Minnesota	Memorial Stadium; Minneapolis, MN (rivalry)	L 6–41	52,984	
*Non-conference game; ^{†}Homecoming; Rankings from AP Poll released prior to the game
