= 1941 Iowa Hawkeyes football team =

American college football season

1941 Iowa Hawkeyes football
- Conference: Big Ten Conference
- Record: 3–5 (2–4 Big Ten)
- Head coach: Eddie Anderson (3rd season)
- MVP: William Diehl
- Captain: William Diehl
- Home stadium: Iowa Stadium

1941 Big Ten Conference football standings
	Conf.					Overall
Team	W		L		T	W		L		T
No. 1 Minnesota $	5	–	0	–	0	8	–	0	–	0
No. 5 Michigan	3	–	1	–	1	6	–	1	–	1
No. 13 Ohio State	3	–	1	–	1	6	–	1	–	1
No. 11 Northwestern	4	–	2	–	0	5	–	3	–	0
Wisconsin	3	–	3	–	0	3	–	5	–	0
Iowa	2	–	4	–	0	3	–	5	–	0
Purdue	1	–	3	–	0	2	–	5	–	1
Indiana	1	–	3	–	0	2	–	6	–	0
Illinois	0	–	5	–	0	2	–	6	–	0
$ – Conference champion; Rankings from AP Poll

The 1941 Iowa Hawkeyes football team was an American football team that represented the University of Iowa as a member of the Big Ten Conference during the 1941 Big Ten football season. In their third year under head coach Eddie Anderson, the Hawkeyes compiled a 3–5 record (2–4 in conference games), finished in sixth place in the Big Ten, and were outscored by a total of 99 to 91. Iowa was ranked No. 51 (out of 681 teams) in the final Litkenhous Ratings released in December 1941.

The team played its home games at Iowa Stadium (later renamed Kinnick Stadium) in Iowa City, Iowa.

== Schedule ==
Date	Opponent	Site	Result	Attendance	Source
September 27	Drake*	Iowa Stadium; Iowa City, IA	W 25–8	20,000	
October 4	at Michigan	Michigan Stadium; Ann Arbor, MI	L 0–6	29,807	
October 18	at Wisconsin	Camp Randall Stadium; Madison, WI (rivalry)	L 0–23	20,000	
October 25	at Purdue	Ross–Ade Stadium; West Lafayette, IN	L 6–7	22,000	
November 1	Indiana^{†}	Iowa Stadium; Iowa City, IA	W 13–7	28,000	
November 8	at Illinois	Memorial Stadium; Champaign, IL	W 21–0	14,339	
November 15	No. 1 Minnesota	Iowa Stadium; Iowa City, IA (rivalry)	L 13–34	43,200	
November 22	at Nebraska*	Memorial Stadium; Lincoln, NE (rivalry)	L 13–14	20,000	
*Non-conference game; ^{†}Homecoming; Rankings from AP Poll released prior to the game
