= 1941 Indiana Hoosiers football team =

American college football season

1941 Indiana Hoosiers football
- Conference: Big Ten Conference
- Record: 2–6 (1–3 Big Ten)
- Head coach: Bo McMillin (8th season)
- MVP: Billy Hillenbrand
- Captain: Eugene White
- Home stadium: Memorial Stadium

1941 Big Ten Conference football standings
	Conf.					Overall
Team	W		L		T	W		L		T
No. 1 Minnesota $	5	–	0	–	0	8	–	0	–	0
No. 5 Michigan	3	–	1	–	1	6	–	1	–	1
No. 13 Ohio State	3	–	1	–	1	6	–	1	–	1
No. 11 Northwestern	4	–	2	–	0	5	–	3	–	0
Wisconsin	3	–	3	–	0	3	–	5	–	0
Iowa	2	–	4	–	0	3	–	5	–	0
Purdue	1	–	3	–	0	2	–	5	–	1
Indiana	1	–	3	–	0	2	–	6	–	0
Illinois	0	–	5	–	0	2	–	6	–	0
$ – Conference champion; Rankings from AP Poll

The 1941 Indiana Hoosiers football team was an American football team that represented Indiana University in the 1941 Big Ten Conference football season. In their eighth season under head coach Bo McMillin, the Hoosiers compiled a 2–6 record (1–3 against conference opponents) and were outscored by a total of 126 to 101.

Indiana was ranked at No. 48 (out of 681 teams) in the final rankings under the Litkenhous Difference by Score System for 1941.

The team played its home games at Memorial Stadium in Bloomington, Indiana.

== Schedule ==
Date	Opponent	Site	Result	Attendance	Source
September 27	Detroit*	Memorial Stadium; Bloomington, IN	L 7–14	10,000	
October 4	at Notre Dame*	Notre Dame Stadium; South Bend, IN	L 6–19	42,000	
October 11	TCU*^{†}	Memorial Stadium; Bloomington, IN	L 14–20	24,000	
October 18	at No. 15 Nebraska*	Memorial Stadium; Lincoln, NE	W 21–13	33,000	
October 25	at Wisconsin	Camp Randall Stadium; Madison, WI	L 25–27	33,000	
November 1	at Iowa	Iowa Stadium; Iowa City, IA	L 7–13	28,000	
November 8	at No. 10 Northwestern	Dyche Stadium; Evanston, IL	L 14–20	35,000	
November 22	Purdue	Memorial Stadium; Bloomington, IN (Old Oaken Bucket)	W 7–0	23,000	
*Non-conference game; ^{†}Homecoming; Rankings from AP Poll released prior to the game

== 1942 NFL draftees ==
Player	Position	Round	Pick	NFL club
Jim Trimble	Tackle	15	139	Green Bay Packers
