= 1941 Purdue Boilermakers football team =

American college football season

1941 Purdue Boilermakers football
- Conference: Big Ten Conference
- Record: 2–5–1 (1–3 Big Ten)
- Head coach: Mal Elward (5th season)
- MVP: Bill Combs
- Captains: Tom Melton; Jim Miller
- Home stadium: Ross–Ade Stadium

1941 Big Ten Conference football standings
	Conf.					Overall
Team	W		L		T	W		L		T
No. 1 Minnesota $	5	–	0	–	0	8	–	0	–	0
No. 5 Michigan	3	–	1	–	1	6	–	1	–	1
No. 13 Ohio State	3	–	1	–	1	6	–	1	–	1
No. 11 Northwestern	4	–	2	–	0	5	–	3	–	0
Wisconsin	3	–	3	–	0	3	–	5	–	0
Iowa	2	–	4	–	0	3	–	5	–	0
Purdue	1	–	3	–	0	2	–	5	–	1
Indiana	1	–	3	–	0	2	–	6	–	0
Illinois	0	–	5	–	0	2	–	6	–	0
$ – Conference champion; Rankings from AP Poll

The 1941 Purdue Boilermakers football team was an American football team that represented Purdue University during the 1941 Big Ten Conference football season. In their fifth season under head coach Mal Elward, the Boilermakers compiled a 2–5–1 record, finished in a tie for seventh place in the Big Ten Conference with a 1–3 record against conference opponents, and were outscored by their opponents by a total of 62 to 27.

Purdue was ranked at No. 50 (out of 681 teams) in the final rankings under the Litkenhous Difference by Score System for 1941.

== Schedule ==
Date	Opponent	Site	Result	Attendance	Source
September 27	Vanderbilt*	Ross–Ade Stadium; West Lafayette, IN	L 0–3	17,000	
October 4	at Pittsburgh*	Pitt Stadium; Pittsburgh, PA	W 6–0	24,000	
October 18	at No. 10 Ohio State	Ohio Stadium; Columbus, OH	L 14–16	66,074	
October 25	Iowa^{†}	Ross–Ade Stadium; West Lafayette, IN	W 7–6	22,000	
November 1	at No. 3 Fordham*	Polo Grounds; New York, NY	L 0–17	20,500	
November 8	Michigan State*	Ross–Ade Stadium; West Lafayette, IN	T 0–0	17,000	
November 15	at Wisconsin	Camp Randall Stadium; Madison, WI	L 0–13	25,000	
November 22	at Indiana	Memorial Stadium; Bloomington, IN (Old Oaken Bucket)	L 0–7	23,000	
*Non-conference game; ^{†}Homecoming; Rankings from AP Poll released prior to the game

== Roster ==
- John Andretich, HB
- Joe Benna, B
- Anthony Berto, HB
- Paul Bohm, G
- Jack Brown, HB
- Marion Carter, HB
- Bob Chester, HB
- Bill Combs, E
- Walter Cook, HB
- Charles Ehrlich, G
- Barry French, T
- John Galvin, HB
- Bob Hajzy, QB
- Bob Johnson, C
- Bob Kersey, QB-E
- LaVern King, E
- Francis Meakim, HB
- Tom Melton, G
- Jim Miller, G
- Ewell O'Bryan, T
- John Petty, FB
- William Powers, G
- Italo Rossi, T
- Jim Rush, E
- Bill Shimer, E
- Fred Smerke, QB-E
- Kenneth Smock, HB
- V. A. Snyder, FB
- Forrest Sprowl
- Wes Stevens, E-G
- Herman Timperman, T
- John Vecs, G
- Bruce Warren, T
