= 1941 All-Big Ten Conference football team =

List of American college football players

The 1941 All-Big Ten Conference football team consists of American football players selected to the All-Big Ten Conference team for the 1941 Big Ten Conference football season. The organizations selecting All-Big Ten teams in 1941 were: the Associated Press (AP), selected by the conference coaches; the United Press (UP), chosen by experts from the conference region; and International News Service (INS), selected based on input from scouts and scribes from the conference region.

Five players were selected on the first team by all three selectors: quarterback Billy Hillenbrand of Indiana; fullback Bob Westfall of Michigan; end Dave Schreiner of Wisconsin; and tackles Alf Bauman of Northwestern and Dick Wildung of Minnesota. Westfall was the only Big Ten player selected in the first round of the 1942 NFL draft. Schreiner was killed in action during the Battle of Okinawa in June 1945.

Three Big Ten players were also selected as consensus first-team players on the 1941 All-America team: Bob Westfall; Dick Wildung; and Minnesota halfback Bruce Smith. Smith also won the 1941 Heisman Trophy.

The 1941 Minnesota Golden Gophers football team was selected as the national champion in the final AP Poll and led all other teams with seven players named to the first and second teams: quarterback Bill Garnaas (AP-2, UP-2); halfbacks Bill Daley (AP-1, UP-1, INS-2) and Bruce Smith (AP-1, UP-2, INS-1); end Bob Fitch (AP-2, UP-1, INS-2); tackle Dick Wildung (AP-1, UP-1, INS-1); and guards Butch Levy (AP-1, UP-1) and Helge Pukema (AP-2, INS-2).

Though not picked for the first team by any of the selectors, Ohio State fullback Jack Graf won the Chicago Tribune Silver Football award as the conference's most valuable player.

== All Big-Ten selections ==
=== Ends ===
- Dave Schreiner, Wisconsin (AP-1; UP-1; INS-1)
- Bob Motl, Northwestern (AP-1; UP-2; INS-1)
- Bob Fitch, Minnesota (AP-2; UP-1; INS-2)
- Bob Shaw, Ohio State (AP-2; UP-2)
- Joe Rogers, Michigan (AP-2)
- Leon Schoenbaum, Ohio State (INS-2)

=== Tackles ===
- Alf Bauman, Northwestern (AP-1; UP-1; INS-1)
- Dick Wildung, Minnesota (AP-1; UP-1; INS-1)
- Al Wistert, Michigan (AP-2; UP-2; INS-1 [as guard])
- Jim Daniell, Ohio State (AP-2; UP-2; INS-2)
- James J. Walker, Iowa (INS-2)

=== Guards ===
- Tom Melton, Purdue (AP-1; UP-1)
- Butch Levy, Minnesota (AP-1; UP-1)
- Fritz Howard, Ohio State (INS-1)
- Lin Houston, Ohio State (AP-2)
- Merv Pregulman, Michigan (UP-2)
- Helge Pukema, Minnesota (AP-2; INS-2)
- Charles A. Steele, Indiana (AP-2)
- George Zorich, Northwestern (UP-2)
- Nick Burke, Northwestern (INS-2)

=== Centers ===
- Robert Ingalls, Michigan (AP-1; UP-1)
- Bill Diehl, Iowa (AP-2, INS-2)
- Iron Man Bob Johnson, Purdue (UP-2; INS-1)

=== Quarterbacks ===
- Billy Hillenbrand, Indiana (AP-1; UP-1 [back]; INS-1 [back])
- Tom Farris, Wisconsin (AP-2)
- Bill Garnaas, Minnesota (AP-2; UP-2)

=== Halfbacks ===
- Bill Daley, Minnesota (AP-1; UP-1 [back]; INS-2 [back])
- Bruce Smith, Minnesota (AP-1; UP-2; INS-1 [back]) (1941 Heisman Trophy winner)
- Otto Graham, Northwestern (AP-2)
- Richard Fisher, Ohio State (AP-2; INS-2 [back])
- Tom Kuzma, Michigan (UP-2; INS-2 [back])
- Bill DeCorrevont, Northwestern (INS-2 [back])

=== Fullbacks ===
- Bob Westfall, Michigan (AP-1; UP-1 [back]; INS-1 [back])
- Pat Harder, Wisconsin (AP-2; UP-1 [back]; INS-1 [back])
- Jack Graf, Ohio State (UP-2)

== Key ==
AP = Associated Press, chosen by conference coaches

UP = United Press, selected "by experts representing every section blanketed by the western conference"

INS = International News Service, "with the assistance of scouts and scribes from all parts of the conference"

Bold = Consensus first-team selection of the AP, UPI, and INS

== See also ==
- 1941 College Football All-America Team
