= 1941 Illinois Fighting Illini football team =

American college football season

1941 Illinois Fighting Illini football
- Conference: Big Ten Conference
- Record: 2–6 (0–5 Big Ten)
- Head coach: Robert Zuppke (29th season)
- MVP: Nate Johnson
- Captain: Game captains
- Home stadium: Memorial Stadium

1941 Big Ten Conference football standings
	Conf.					Overall
Team	W		L		T	W		L		T
No. 1 Minnesota $	5	–	0	–	0	8	–	0	–	0
No. 5 Michigan	3	–	1	–	1	6	–	1	–	1
No. 13 Ohio State	3	–	1	–	1	6	–	1	–	1
No. 11 Northwestern	4	–	2	–	0	5	–	3	–	0
Wisconsin	3	–	3	–	0	3	–	5	–	0
Iowa	2	–	4	–	0	3	–	5	–	0
Purdue	1	–	3	–	0	2	–	5	–	1
Indiana	1	–	3	–	0	2	–	6	–	0
Illinois	0	–	5	–	0	2	–	6	–	0
$ – Conference champion; Rankings from AP Poll

The 1941 Illinois Fighting Illini football team was an American football team that represented the University of Illinois during the 1941 Big Ten Conference football season. In their 29th and final season under head coach Robert Zuppke, the Illini compiled a 2–6 record and finished in last place in the Big Ten Conference. Illinois was ranked at No. 71 (out of 681 teams) in the final rankings under the Litkenhous Difference by Score System for 1941.

Tackle Nate Johnson was selected as the team's most valuable player. Other notable players included Alex Agase.

The team played its home games at Memorial Stadium in Champaign, Illinois.

== Schedule ==
Date	Opponent	Site	Result	Attendance	Source
October 4	Miami (OH)*	Memorial Stadium; Champaign, IL	W 45–0	20,585–21,500	
October 11	at Minnesota	Memorial Stadium; Minneapolis, MN	L 6–34	50,435	
October 18	Drake*	Memorial Stadium; Champaign, IL	W 40–0	12,000–12,193	
October 25	at No. 7 Notre Dame*	Notre Dame Stadium; Notre Dame, IN	L 14–49	45,000–48,000	
November 1	No. 7 Michigan	Memorial Stadium; Champaign, IL (rivalry)	L 0–20	30,101	
November 8	Iowa	Memorial Stadium; Champaign, IL	L 0–21	14,339	
November 15	at No. 20 Ohio State	Ohio Stadium; Columbus, OH (Illibuck)	L 7–12	41,544	
November 22	at No. 10 Northwestern	Dyche Stadium; Evanston, IL (rivalry)	L 0–27	26,000	
*Non-conference game; Rankings from AP Poll released prior to the game

== Roster ==
At the end of the season, the following 25 players received varsity letters on the 1941 Illinois team:

1. Alex Agase, Evanston, IL
2. Lavere Astroth, Alton, IL
3. Anthony Butkovich, St. David, IL
4. Ken Cheeley, Foley, MN
5. Robert Cherry, Girard, IL
6. Walter Correll, Lincoln, IL
7. Elmer Engel, La Salle, IL
8. John Genis, Chicago
9. Richard Good, South Bend, IN
10. Maurie Gould, Bronxville, NY
11. Ray Grierson, Champaign, IL
12. Don Griffin, Chicago
13. Nathan Johnson, Benton, IL
14. Dominic Mattiazza, Oglesby, IL
15. James McCarthy, Lockport, IL
16. Thomas McCullough, Aurora, IL
17. Paul Milosevich, Ziegler, IL
18. Clifford Niedzelski, Foley, MN
19. Isaiah Owens, Gary, IN
20. Joseph Pawloski, Aurora, IL
21. Myron Pfeifer, Illiopolis, IL
22. James Smith, Murphysboro, IL
23. Wes Tregoning, La Salle, IL
24. Richard Tumilty, Lincoln, IL
25. Robert Wilson, Champaign, IL
