= Reuben Kelto =

American football player (1919–1998)

- Reuben Kelto, 1940

Profile
- Position: Tackle

Personal information
- Born: September 10, 1919; Bessemer, Michigan, U.S.
- Died: March 19, 1998 (aged 78); Colorado Springs, Colorado, U.S.
- Listed height: 6 ft 1 in (1.85 m)
- Listed weight: 198 lb (90 kg)

Career information
- High school: A.D. Johnston High School
- College: Michigan (1939–1941)

Awards and highlights
- Most Valuable Player, 1941 Michigan Wolverines football team

Reuben W. Kelto (September 10, 1919 – March 19, 1998) was an American football player. He played at the tackle position for the University of Michigan from 1939 to 1941. He was chosen as the Most Valuable Player on the 1941 Michigan Wolverines football team.

Kelto was born in 1919 in Bessemer, Michigan, the son of Emil and Lilly Kelto. He graduated from the A.D. Johnston High School in 1938.

He enrolled at the University of Michigan and played football under head coach Fritz Crisler from 1939 to 1941. He first gained attention in Michigan's 1939 victory over Iowa. Following the game, Bob Murphy of the Detroit News wrote: "A new star stood out for the Wolverines in Reuben Kelto of Bessemer. Subbing for Bill (Savilla) at various intervals in the game Kelto did an outstanding job." Michigan line coach Biggie Munn called Kelton one of the "unsung heroes of the 1940 grid battles."

Kelto went on to become the Most Valuable Player on the 1941 Michigan Wolverines football team. The 1941 team under head coach Fritz Crisler finished with a 6-1-1 record and were ranked fifth in the final Associated Press poll. After playing 56 of 60 minutes against Illinois in 1941, a writer in the Detroit Free Press wrote: "If ever there was an under-rated football player, it is this 198-pound tackle."

Kelto received a Bachelor of Science degree in engineering degree from the University of Michigan and later received a master's degree from the Chrysler Institute of Engineering in Detroit, Michigan.

Kelto served in the U.S. Navy during World War II .

He married Florence Albrecht on August 17, 1946, in a ceremony held in Shawano, Wisconsin, with the reception at the Hotel Martin in Bonduel, Wisconsin. At the time of the wedding, Kelto had recently been discharged from the Navy and was working for Chrysler Corporation. Over the course of his professional career, Kelto held positions as an electrical engineer with Chrysler and Tecumseh Products. He was also a lifetime member of the American Society of Heating, Refrigeration and Air Conditioning Engineers. He lived in Dayton, Ohio, Adrian, Michigan, and, for the last 12 years of his life, Colorado Springs, Colorado.

In 1975, Kelto was inducted into the Upper Peninsula Sports Hall of Fame.

Kelto died in 1998 from complications of Alzheimer's disease. He was survived by his wife, Florence, three sons (Clifford, Martin, and Douglas), a daughter (Vivian Khalife) and seven grandchildren.
