= George Ceithaml =

American football player and coach (1921–2012)

Profile
- Position: Quarterback

Personal information
- Born: February 10, 1921; Chicago, Illinois, U.S.
- Died: May 24, 2012 (aged 91); Dana Point, California, U.S.

Career information
- College: Michigan
- NFL draft: 1943: 3rd round, 19th overall pick

Awards and highlights
- First-team All-Big Ten (1942); Captain of 1942 All-American Blocking Team

George Frank Ceithaml (/ˈsaɪhæməl/ SY-ham-əl; February 10, 1921 – May 24, 2012) was an American football quarterback and coach. He was the starting quarterback for Fritz Crisler's University of Michigan football teams in 1941 and 1942. Crisler later called Ceithaml "the smartest player he ever taught." Ceithaml was selected as the quarterback on the 1942 All-Big Ten Conference team, the captain of the 1942 All-American Blocking Team, and was the 19th player selected in the 1943 NFL draft. He later served as an assistant football coach at Michigan and the University of Southern California.

== Early life ==
Ceithaml was born in Chicago and raised on the city's South Side. He was an All-City quarterback two straight years for Lindbloom High School.

== University of Michigan ==
In 1939 Ceithaml enrolled at the University of Michigan and joined the football team at the beginning of the Fritz Crisler era. He was 6-feet tall and weighed 184 pounds as a football player at Michigan.

As a sophomore in 1940 Ceithaml was the backup quarterback to Forest Evashevski on a team the included All-American Tom Harmon. Ceithaml first saw substantial playing time in November 1940 leading the press to report: "George Ceithaml has ended Michigan's two-year search for a capable substitute for Forest Evashevski. Ceithaml, a 190-pound sophomore, turned in a fine performance calling signals and blocking for the Wolverines against Pennsylvania." Ceithaml received the 1940 Meyer Morton Award, established by the University of Michigan's "M" Club to recognize the underclassman who shows the greatest development and most promise as a football player.

During his junior and senior years in 1941 and 1942, Ceithaml started all 18 of Michigan's games and played on defense as well as offense. In 1941, he started all eight games for a Michigan team that went 6-1-1 and finished the season ranked No. 5 in the final Associated Press poll. As a senior in 1942, he started all ten games and was selected as the captain during a season in which the Wolverines finished with a record of 7-3 and were ranked No. 9 in the country in the final Associated Press poll.

The 1942 team captained by Ceithaml has been called "Crisler's '42 Iron Men":

"What made the 1942 Michigan football season interesting was the great spirit shown by a club that lacked bench strength. The Wolverines had to play up to eight men both ways every Saturday, yet they finished with a 7-3 record. Three years later Coach Fritz Crisler invented two platoon football in a futile attempt to wear down the superior Blanchard-Davis Army team at Yankee Stadium, and from that time on ironman football became a memory that not too many of today's fans still remember. ... In the backfield George Ceithaml at quarterback and Bob Wiese at fullback rarely took a breather."

The 1942 season opened with a game against a military team from the Great Lakes Naval Station that featured 13 All-Americans and several professional players. Despite being rated as 35-point underdogs, the Wolverines held the Great Lakes team scoreless and won 9-0. The 1942 season also featured the first match between Michigan and Notre Dame since 1909. Ceithaml led Michigan to a 33-20 win over the Fighting Irish and scored the Wolverines' first touchdown on a quarterback sneak. In a 1993 interview, Ceithaml recalled that the 1942 Notre Dame match was "more than just a game." He recalled: "We were so revved, we could have played two more quarters. The coaches never had to say a word to get us jacked up. We're Michigan. And the personal pride -- the pride of beating Notre Dame -- was intense."

Ceithaml had the responsibility to call the plays in Crisler's complex single-wing offense, and Crisler later called Ceithaml "the smartest player he ever taught." After the plays were called, the quarterback in Crisler's offense was mainly a blocker. Before a 1942 game between Michigan and Harvard, the Harvard Crimson wrote: "Directing the team is Captain and quarterback George Ceithaml, who is a canny play-caller and rugged blocker." Ceithaml developed a reputation as a fierce, "granite-shouldered" blocker, and some of his most important contributions came as a blocker for fullback Bob Wiese and halfback Tom Kuzma. Football Hall of Famers Red Grange and Elmer Layden called Ceithaml "one of the best blockers, signal callers, and defensive players in Michigan history."

Ceithaml's final game for Michigan was the 1942 season finale, a 28-14 win over Iowa. After the game, Associated Press sports writer Paul Chandler credited Ceithaml for his play-calling and "clever" blending of reverses, laterals and forward passes.

At the end of the 1942 season, Ceithaml was named as the first-team quarterback on the Associated Press All-Big Ten Conference team and the captain of Wirt Gammon's 1942 All-American Blocking Team. In January 1943, Ceithaml was a starter for the East All-Stars in the 1943 East-West Shrine Game. He intercepted three passes in the game and helped the East to a 13-12 win.

== Military service and post-war football ==
Ceithaml was the 19th player selected in the 1943 NFL draft, taken as the third round pick of the Brooklyn Dodgers. However, he joined the United States Navy after graduating in June 1943 rather than sign with the National Football League. Ceithaml reached the rank of lieutenant and participated in the January 1944 landing at Anzio Beach and the June 1944 D-Day landing at Normandy.

After returning from military service, Ceithaml was employed by the Ford Motor Company. In 1946, Ceithaml was chosen to play for the holdover College All-Star team in an annual match against the NFL champions. Ceithaml was reunited with former Michigan teammate Tom Harmon on a College All-Star team that defeated the NFL champion Rams by a score of 16-0. Ceithaml intercepted a pass off Kenny Washington in the fourth quarter of the game to stop a late drive by the Rams. In August 1946, the Detroit Lions engaged in a trade with the Boston Yanks to obtain the right to sign Ceithaml, but Ceithaml opted not to play professional football.

== Coach at Michigan ==
In March 1947 Fritz Crisler hired Ceithaml to return to the University of Michigan as an assistant coach. He was initially assigned as the coach of the junior varsity squad, but was promoted to the position of backfield coach. Ceithaml was an assistant coach on Michigan's 1947 and 1948 championship football teams that compiled a two-year record of 19-0 and outscored opponents by a combined two-season total of 646-97. In 1949, the University of Michigan yearbook credited Ceithaml as being "the man behind the famous Michigan single-wing attack." Ceithaml continued to serve as an assistant football coach at Michigan through the 1952 season.

While staying in Southern California for the 1948 Rose Bowl between Michigan and USC, Ceithaml met Joan Kalmbach, a graduate of Pasadena City College and former Rose Bowl queen semifinalist. Kalmbach, an ardent USC fan, was working for Los Angeles radio station KXLA, and the two became acquainted on a pre-Rose Bowl trip to Catalina Island. Ceithaml proposed to Kalmbach on New Year's Eve—the night before Michigan beat USC 49-0 in the Rose Bowl. The couple were married in Ann Arbor in April 1948, four months after they met.

== Coach at USC ==
In 1953 Ceithaml moved with his wife and son, George W. Ceithaml, to Los Angeles after accepting a position as the backfield coach for the USC Trojans. Having lost badly to Michigan's single-wing offense in 1948, USC head coach Jess Hill told reporters, "We had to have a man who knew the single wing." Hill checked with Crisler, and Crisler recommended Ceithaml. Based on the recommendation, Hill hired Ceithaml "sight unseen." The Los Angeles Times expressed their hope that Ceithaml would teach USC's backs Michigan's "fullback spinner" and other "hocus pocus" plays. Ceithaml served as USC's backfield coach from 1953 to 1956.

In January 1956 San Diego State University sought to lure Ceithaml away from USC by offering him a head coaching position and faculty status. Ceithaml opted to remain at USC for the 1956 season.

In February 1957 Don Clark was hired as USC's new head coach; and one week later, Ceithaml announced his retirement from the coaching profession. He told the press at the time, "I intend to retire from coaching and seek an opportunity in another field."

Hall of Fame football coach George Allen credited Ceithaml as one of his influences in his book, "How To Scout Football."

== Later life ==
In April 1957 Ceithaml was hired as the divisional manager in the Pasadena area for Investors Diversified Services, Inc., then the world's largest investment management firm. By 1971, he was the company's regional vice president and shortly thereafter moved to the company's headquarters in Minnesota to become the company's senior vice president for marketing.

Ceithaml retired in 1983 and moved back to California with his wife Joan. He died on May 24, 2012, at the age of 91 in Dana Point, California.
