= Bob Sweiger =

American football player (1919–1975)

No. 34, 80
- Positions: Wingback, defensive back

Personal information
- Born: September 20, 1919; Minneapolis, Minnesota, U.S.
- Died: November 1, 1975 (aged 56); Hennepin County, Minnesota, U.S.
- Listed height: 6 ft 0 in (1.83 m)
- Listed weight: 209 lb (95 kg)

Career information
- High school: Central (Minneapolis)
- College: Minnesota (1938–1941)
- NFL draft: 1942: 3rd round, 23rd overall pick

Career history

Playing
- Los Angeles Bulldogs (1945); New York Yankees (1946–1948); Chicago Hornets (1949)

Coaching
- Chicago Hornets (1949) Assistant backfield coach

Awards and highlights
- 2× National champion (1940, 1941)

Career AAFC statistics
- Receptions: 42
- Receiving yards: 418
- Receiving touchdowns: 2
- Interceptions: 7
- Stats at Pro Football Reference

Robert Michael Sweiger (September 20, 1919 – November 1, 1975) was an American football back who played four seasons in the All-America Football Conference (AAFC) with the New York Yankees and Chicago Hornets. He was drafted by the New York Giants of the National Football League (NFL) in the third round of the 1942 NFL draft. He played college football at the University of Minnesota and attended Central High School in Minneapolis, Minnesota.

== College career ==
Sweiger played fullback for the Minnesota Golden Gophers from 1939 to 1941. He won the Bronko Nagurski Award, given to the team's most valuable player, in 1941.

== Professional career ==
Sweiger was selected by the New York Giants of the NFL in the third round with the 23rd pick in the 1942 NFL draft. He did not play for the Giants and instead enlisted in the United States Navy to serve in World War II. He played football for the Great Lakes Navy Bluejackets of the Great Lakes Naval Training Station while in the Navy. Sweiger also played and coached football at the Farragut Naval Training Station.

He played in 41 games, starting 30, for the New York Yankees of the AAFC from 1946 to 1948. He played in twelve games, all starts, for the AAFC's Chicago Hornets during the 1949 season.
