= Tom Kuzma =

American football player (1922–1996)

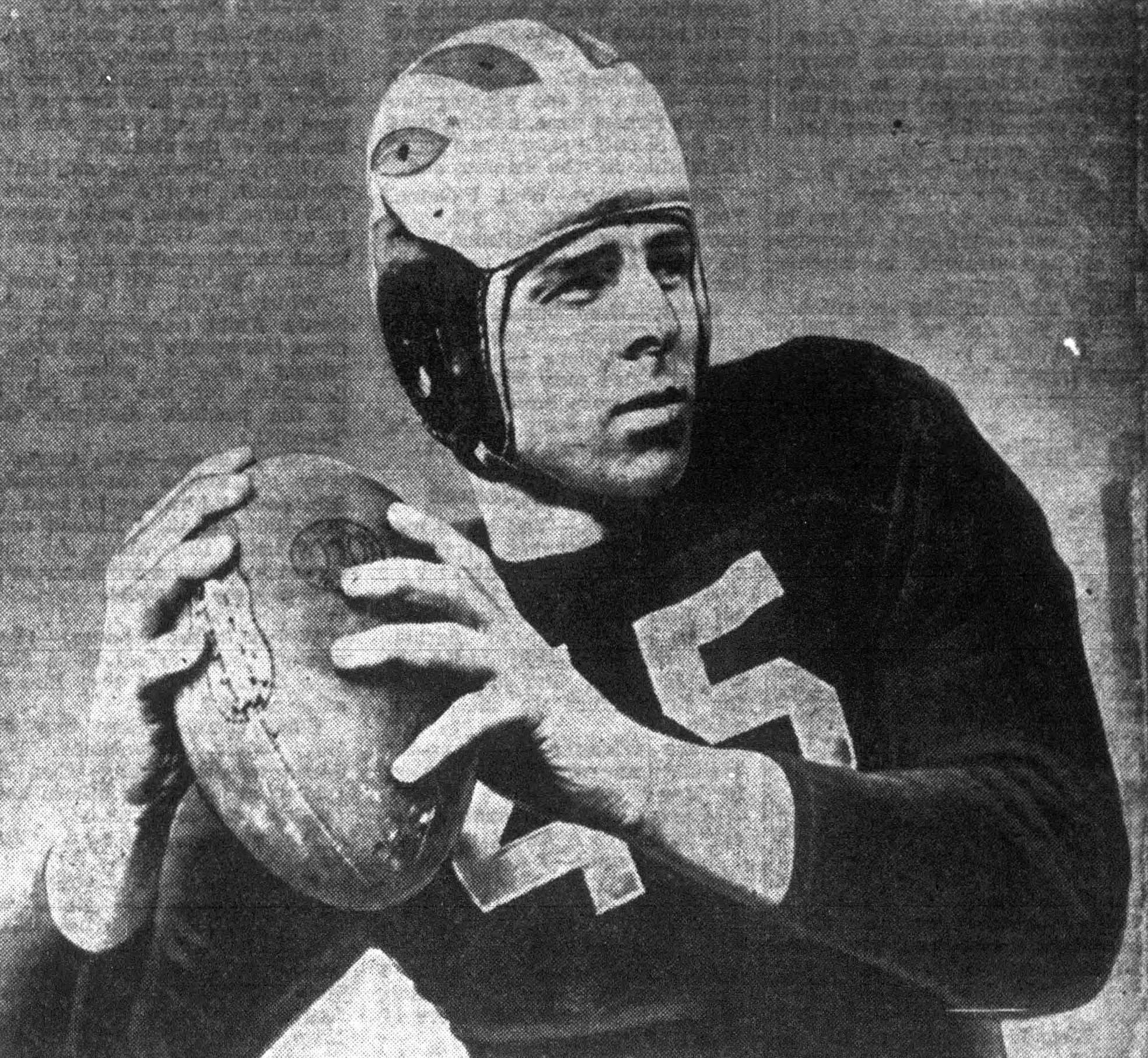
- Kuzma, circa 1941

Profile
- Position: Halfback

Personal information
- Born: April 3, 1922; Gary, Indiana, U.S.
- Died: May 19, 1996 (aged 74); Cape Coral, Florida, U.S.
- Listed height: 6 ft 3 in (1.91 m)
- Listed weight: 195 lb (88 kg)

Career information
- College: University of Michigan

Awards and highlights
- 2× Second-team All-Big Ten (1941, 1942)

Tom George Kuzma (April 3, 1922 – May 19, 1996) was an American football player for the University of Michigan. He was the starting left halfback for Fritz Crisler's Michigan teams in 1941 and 1942.

== Early life ==
Kuzma was a native of Gary, Indiana. He attended Emerson High School in Gary, where he was an all-state fullback and starred in three sports—football, basketball and track. Football Hall of Famer Tom Harmon also hailed from Gary. Harmon graduated in 1937 and enrolled at the University of Michigan. Kuzma graduated two years later and followed Harmon to Michigan. He was 6 feet, 3 inches tall, and weighed 195 pounds while at Michigan. He attended the school of business administration at Michigan and was a member of Phi Gamma Delta.

== Football career ==
Kuzma followed Harmon as Michigan's principal running back in 1941, and comparisons to Harmon were inevitable. He lacked Harmon's speed and was instead a power-runner who ran through and over the opposition. As NEA Sports Editor Harry Grayson put it, "He's a smacker from Smackersville." Aside from his ability as a power runner, Kuzma was a good passer and defender, as well as serving as the Wolverines punter and punt returner. He was considered the Wolverines' best punter since Harry Kipke had played for Michigan 20 years earlier. In a 1941 game against Northwestern, Kuzma punted the ball 53 yards with the ball going out of bounds at the Northwestern four-yard line; Fritz Crisler called the kick "miraculous." In the same game, he threw two touchdown passes, including a 46-yard pass in the fourth quarter that proved to be the game winner as Michigan defeated Northwestern, 14–7.

In his first four games as a starter in 1941, Kuzma scored five touchdowns and passed for two more. By mid-season, the Associated Press ran a feature story on Kuzma, reporting that "this 19-year-old gridder had surpassed Harmon's sophomore record in scoring, had neared his first-year passing mark and had become one of the Western Conference's greatest kickers." Kuzma had a good sophomore year, rushing for an average of 4.3 yards per carry and finishing second in the Big Ten Conference in total offense yards per game.

He was inducted into the military in 1943 and subsequently drafted 22nd overall by the Green Bay Packers in the third round of the 1944 NFL draft. After World War II, Kuzma returned to the University of Michigan to complete his degree, but he did not return to the football team. He graduated in 1947 and chose not to play football professionally but rather served as an assistant football coach at the University of Colorado from 1947 to 1948.

== Later life ==
In 1949, Kuzma returned to Michigan and went into the steel business in Detroit. He remained in the steel business until 1979. He next co-founded a chemical coatings company where he worked until his retirement in 1987. He also served as president of the University of Michigan's "M" Club.

Kuzma died at age 74 on May 19, 1996, in Cape Coral, Florida.
