= 1941 Minnesota Golden Gophers football team =

American college football season

1941 Minnesota Golden Gophers football

AP Poll national champion Big Ten champion
- Conference: Big Ten Conference

Ranking
- AP: No. 1
- Record: 8–0 (5–0 Big Ten)
- Head coach: Bernie Bierman (10th season)
- Offensive scheme: Single-wing
- MVP: Bob Sweiger
- Captain: Bruce Smith
- Home stadium: Memorial Stadium

1941 Big Ten Conference football standings
	Conf.					Overall
Team	W		L		T	W		L		T
No. 1 Minnesota $	5	–	0	–	0	8	–	0	–	0
No. 5 Michigan	3	–	1	–	1	6	–	1	–	1
No. 13 Ohio State	3	–	1	–	1	6	–	1	–	1
No. 11 Northwestern	4	–	2	–	0	5	–	3	–	0
Wisconsin	3	–	3	–	0	3	–	5	–	0
Iowa	2	–	4	–	0	3	–	5	–	0
Purdue	1	–	3	–	0	2	–	5	–	1
Indiana	1	–	3	–	0	2	–	6	–	0
Illinois	0	–	5	–	0	2	–	6	–	0
$ – Conference champion; Rankings from AP Poll

The 1941 Minnesota Golden Gophers football team represented the University of Minnesota in the 1941 Big Ten Conference football season. In their tenth year under head coach Bernie Bierman, the Golden Gophers compiled an undefeated 8–0 record and outscored their opponents by a combined total of 186 to 38. The team's national championship run in the days before the attack on Pearl Harbor was chronicled in journalist Danny Spewak's book, "From the Gridiron to the Battlefield: Minnesota's March to a College Football Title and into World War II," published in 2021 by Rowman & Littlefield.

The team was selected national champion by eleven NCAA-designated major selectors in Associated Press, Billingsley, Boand, DeVold, Dunkel, Football Research, Helms, Litkenhous, National Championship Foundation, Poling, Sagarin, Sagarin (ELO-Chess).

Halfback Bruce Smith was named an All-American by the Walter Camp Football Foundation, INS, Time-Life, United Press (UP), Associated Press (AP) and Look Magazine. Smith was also awarded the Heisman Trophy, the only Golden Gopher to win the award.

Tackle Dick Wildung was named an All-American by the Walter Camp Football Foundation, INS, Time Life, AP and UPI. Wildung, Smith, halfback Bill Daley, end Bob Fitch and guard Len Levy were named All-Big Ten.

Back Bob Sweiger was awarded the team most valuable player award.

Total attendance for the season was 239,227, which averaged to 47,845. The season high for attendance was against Northwestern.

== Schedule ==
Date	Opponent	Rank	Site	Result	Attendance	Source
September 27	at Washington*		Husky Stadium; Seattle, WA	W 14–6	43,000	
October 11	Illinois		Memorial Stadium; Minneapolis, MN	W 34–6	50,435	
October 18	Pittsburgh*	No. 1	Memorial Stadium; Minneapolis, MN	W 39–0	35,000	
October 25	at No. 3 Michigan	No. 1	Michigan Stadium; Ann Arbor, MI (Little Brown Jug)	W 7–0	85,753	
November 1	No. 9 Northwestern^{†}	No. 1	Memorial Stadium; Minneapolis, MN	W 8–7	64,464	
November 8	Nebraska*	No. 2	Memorial Stadium; Minneapolis, MN (rivalry)	W 9–0	42,893	
November 15	at Iowa	No. 1	Iowa Stadium; Iowa City, IA (rivalry)	W 34–13	43,200	
November 22	Wisconsin	No. 1	Memorial Stadium; Minneapolis, MN (rivalry)	W 41–6	52,984	
*Non-conference game; ^{†}Homecoming; Rankings from AP Poll released prior to the game

== Rankings ==
Ranking movements Legend: ██ Increase in ranking ██ Decrease in ranking т = Tied with team above or below ( ) = First-place votes
	Week							
Poll	1	2	3	4	5	6	7	Final
AP	1 (66)	1 (69)	1т (60)	2 (34.5)	1 (99)	1 (112)	1 (95)	1 (84.5)

== Game summaries ==
=== Michigan ===
Week 5: Minnesota at Michigan

Team	1	2	3	4	Total
• Minnesota	0	7	0	0	7
Michigan	0	0	0	0	0

- Date: October 25, 1941
- Location: Michigan Stadium
  Ann Arbor, Michigan
- Game attendance: 85,753
- Referee: Frank Birch (Earlham)

On October 25, 1941, Minnesota, ranked #1 in the AP Poll, played Michigan, ranked #3 in the country. Minnesota won the game by a 7 to 0 score on a five-yard touchdown run by halfback Herman Frickey in the second quarter. The touchdown was set up by a 78-yard punt and a 43-yard pass, both by 1941 Heisman Trophy winner Bruce Smith. Minnesota gained 179 rushing yards in the game, while Michigan tallied 135 rushing yards. In the fourth quarter, Michigan twice drove deep into Minnesota territory, but both drives ended with pass interceptions by Minnesota's quarterback Bill Garnaas. The loss was the eighth in a row for the Wolverines against the Golden Gophers. The crowd of 85,753 at Michigan Stadium was the largest to that date to see a football game between two Big Ten Conference teams.
