= Fred Dawley =

American football player (1921–1994)

Profile
- Position: Fullback

Personal information
- Born: March 11, 1921; Bay City, Michigan, U.S.
- Died: April 13, 1994 (aged 73); Stuart, Florida, U.S.

Career information
- College: Michigan

Career history
- 1939–1941: Michigan
- 1944: Detroit Lions
- 1945: Los Angeles Bulldogs

Frederick Martin Dawley (March 11, 1921 – April 13, 1994) was an American football player. Dawley played for Detroit's Pershing High School before enrolling at the University of Michigan. He played at the fullback position for the University of Michigan from 1939 to 1941. In October 1944, Dawley was signed by the Detroit Lions and played professional football for the Lions in the 1944 NFL season. In 1945, the Lions loaned Dawley "for seasoning" to the Los Angeles Bulldogs in the Pacific Coast Professional Football League. Playing for the Bulldogs, Dawley kicked extra points and sprinted for an 81-yard touchdown in a game against the Oakland Giants. The Los Angeles Times described Dawley's touchdown run as follows:

"The Bulldogs took a 7-0 lead in the opening period, thanks to an 81-yard sprint by Fred Dawley, starting on the 19-yard stripe, smashed through center, busted past three men in the secondary and outsped the field for the touchdown. He made it despite his 210 pounds with a couple of lighter men on his heels."

The United Press called Dawley's run the "top play of the day."

Dawley died in 1994 at age 73 while living in Stuart, Florida.
