= Bill Garnaas =

American football player (1921–2002)

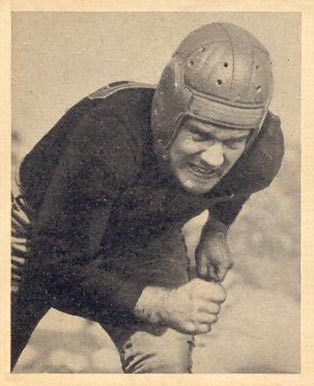
- Garnaas on a 1948 Bowman football card

No. 30
- Position: Quarterback

Personal information
- Born: October 8, 1921; Cheyenne, Wyoming, U.S.
- Died: May 9, 2002 (aged 80); South St. Paul, Minnesota, U.S.
- Listed height: 5 ft 11 in (1.80 m)
- Listed weight: 187 lb (85 kg)

Career information
- High school: Marshall (Minneapolis, Minnesota)
- College: Minnesota (1940–1943)
- NFL draft: 1944: 6th round, 44th overall pick

Career history
- Chicago Cardinals (1946)*; Pittsburgh Steelers (1946–1948)
- * Offseason or practice squad member only

Awards and highlights
- 2× National champion (1940, 1941); Second-team All-Big Ten (1941)

Career NFL statistics
- Receptions: 8
- Receiving yards: 200
- Touchdowns: 3
- Stats at Pro Football Reference

Wilford Benjamin Garnaas (October 8, 1921 – May 9, 2002) was an American professional football player who played three seasons with the Pittsburgh Steelers of the National Football League (NFL). He was selected by the Chicago Cardinals in the sixth round of the 1944 NFL draft after playing college football at the University of Minnesota.

== Early life and college ==
Wilford Benjamin Garnaas was born on October 8, 1921, in Cheyenne, Wyoming. He attended Marshall High School in Minneapolis, Minnesota.

Garnaas was a member of the Minnesota Golden Gophers from 1940 to 1943, and a three-year letterman from 1941 to 1943. He was named second-team All-Big Ten by both the Associated Press and United Press in 1941. The Golden Gophers were national champions in 1940 and 1941. He served in the United States Navy during World War II.

== Professional career ==
Garnaas was selected by the Chicago Cardinals in the sixth round, with the 44th overall pick, of the 1944 NFL draft. After his stint in the Navy was over, he signed with the Cardinals in 1946 but was released later that year.

Garnaas then signed with the Pittsburgh Steelers in 1946 and played in ten games, starting three, for the team during the 1946 season, catching three passes for 56 yards and one touchdown and returning two kicks for 29 yards. He appeared in ten games for the Steelers again in 1947, recording five receptions for 144 yards and two touchdowns, one kick return for 17 yards, and one fumble recovery. He also played in one playoff game that season. Garnaas played in six games for the Steelers during the 1948 season, returning one kick for 18 yards, before being released on November 4, 1948.

Garnaas is featured on a 1948 Bowman Football Card.

== Death ==
Garnaas died on May 9, 2002, in South St. Paul, Minnesota.
