= Don Robinson (American football player) =

Biographical details
- Born: March 1, 1922; Detroit, Michigan, U.S.
- Died: January 24, 2009 (aged 86); Vero Beach, Florida, U.S.

Playing career
- 1941–1943: Michigan
- 1945–1946: Michigan
- Positions: Halfback, quarterback

Coaching career (HC unless noted)
- 1948–1956: Michigan (assistant)

Don William Robinson (March 1, 1922 – January 24, 2009) was an American college football player and coach. He played at the halfback and quarterback positions for the University of Michigan from 1941 to 1942 and, after serving as a heavy bomber pilot during World War II, from 1945 to 1946. He also played and served as captain of the Michigan Wolverines baseball team. From 1948 to 1957, he was an assistant football coach at Michigan.

== Football player and military service ==
Robinson was born in Detroit, Michigan in 1922. He played football for the Michigan Wolverines football teams as a halfback in 1941, 1942, and 1946. He graduated from the University of Michigan in 1947. On October 11, 1941, Robinson scored a touchdown in a 40–0 victory over the Pitt Panthers on his first carry as a college football player. The Michiganensian reported: "In this game the spectators got their initial glimpse of triple-threat Don Robinson who in his first running attempt in collegiate competition shook off two would-be tacklers and scored the fifth Michigan marker of the afternoon." In a 1942 victory over Notre Dame, Robinson was the holder on a fake field goal attempt. After the snap, "Robinson arose from his crouch and swirled around his left attend for a touchdown."

On February 22, 1943, Robinson enlisted in the United States Army Air Forces for the duration of World War II. He was a B-25 Liberator heavy bomber pilot during the war, receiving two Distinguished Flying Crosses.

Robinson missed the 1943 and 1944 football seasons while serving in the military, but he returned to Michigan in time for the 1945 and 1946 football seasons. Robinson was used increasingly as a passer in 1945. In a 26–0 victory over Minnesota, Robinson threw passes of 44 and 12 yards for Michigan's final touchdown. In a 1946 victory over Michigan State, Robinson recovered the ball after a Michigan extra point attempt was blocked and passed the ball to Len Ford for the conversion.

Robinson also played shortstop for Michigan's baseball team in 1943 and 1946 and served as the team's captain. He was also a member of the Chi Psi fraternity and the Sphinx Junior Honor Society at Michigan.

== Football coach ==
In March 1948, Robinson was named the junior varsity football coach at Michigan. In March 1953, Robinson was promoted to the varsity coaching staff and was assigned responsibility as the team's backfield coach. Amid speculation that head coach Bennie Oosterbaan might be fired after the 1956 season, Robinson resigned as Michigan's backfield coach in February 1957. Robinson reportedly left his position on the coaching staff to pursue a position in business.

== Later years ==
Robinson remained active in the University of Michigan Alumni Association and served as president of the Michigan Alumni Clubs of Ann Arbor and Detroit. He was a leader in raising approximately $15 million in funds for Schembechler Hall and the University of Michigan Golf Course. He also served on the board of National Bank and Trust Company and as president of the Ann Arbor Chamber of Commerce and of the Barton Hills Country Club.

In the 1980s, Robinson began spending his winters in Vero Beach, Florida. He became a full-time resident of Vero Beach in 2006 and died there in January 2009 at age 86.

Robinson and his wife Marjorie had three children.
