= James J. Walker (American football) =

American football player and coach (1918–1975)

Biographical details
- Born: May 13, 1918; Macon, Georgia, U.S.
- Died: October 1, 1975 (aged 57); Xenia, Ohio, U.S.

Playing career
- 1939–1942: Iowa
- Position: Tackle

Coaching career (HC unless noted)
- 1947–1956: Central State (OH) (line)
- 1957–1964: Central State (OH)
- 1967–1973: Central State (OH)

Head coaching record
- Overall: 60–54–3

Accomplishments and honors

Awards
- Chicago Tribune All-Star (1942)

James J. Walker (May 13, 1918 – October 1, 1975) was an American college football player and coach. He served as the head football coach at Central State University in Wilberforce, Ohio, from 1957 to 1964 and 1967 to 1971.

Born in Macon, Georgia, Walker graduated Washington High School in South Bend, Indiana, before attending the University of Iowa, where he played football for the Iowa Hawkeyes under head coach Eddie Anderson. After service in the United States Coast Guard during World War II and two years playing professional football with the Oakland Giants, Walker joined the coaching staff at Central State as an assistant to Gaston F. Lewis before succeeding Lewis as head football coach in 1957. He was also an assistant professor in the Department of Health and Physical Education at Central State and briefly coached the school's baseball team. Walker died on October 1, 1975, at Green Memorial Hospital, in Xenia, Ohio, following a brief illness.
