= Tom Farris =

American football player (1920–2002)

No. 36, 65
- Position: Quarterback

Personal information
- Born: September 16, 1920; Casper, Wyoming, U.S.
- Died: November 16, 2002 (aged 82); Citrus Heights, California, U.S.
- Listed height: 6 ft 1 in (1.85 m)
- Listed weight: 185 lb (84 kg)

Career information
- High school: Englewood (Chicago, Illinois)
- College: Wisconsin
- NFL draft: 1942: 11th round, 99th overall pick

Career history
- Chicago Bears (1946–1947); Chicago Rockets (1948)

Awards and highlights
- NFL champion (1946); Second-team All-Big Ten (1941)

Career NFL statistics
- TD–INT: 1–2
- Passing yards: 108
- Passer rating: 28.9
- Stats at Pro Football Reference

Thomas George Farris (September 16, 1920 – November 16, 2002) was an American professional football player who was a quarterback for the Chicago Bears from 1946–1947 in the National Football League (NFL), and the Chicago Rockets in 1948 in the All-America Football Conference (AAFC). He played college football for the Wisconsin Badgers before being selected by the Green Bay Packers in the 11th round of the 1942 NFL draft. He won the 1946 NFL Championship Game with the Bears.

== Early life and education ==
Farris was born on September 16, 1920 in Casper, Wyoming. He then attended Englewood High School in Chicago, Illinois. Afterwards, he attended the University of Wisconsin, where he played college football for the Badgers from 1939 to 1941. While at Wisconsin, he received the $100 Walter Alexander scholarship. Farris was selected as quarterback for the second 1941 All-Big Ten Conference football team. He was named the captain of the Badgers for the 1941 season. On March 24, 1942, Farris played in a charity basketball game against the Oshkosh All-Stars, who were the reigning National Basketball League champions.

== Professional career ==
After his college football career, Farris was an 11th round selection (99th overall pick) of the 1942 NFL draft by the Green Bay Packers. When the Packers were going to play the Chicago Bears, Farris said to coach Curly Lambeau, "I've never been on a winning team, so maybe I'm a jinx. How about making a deal to get me on the Chicago Bears". However before the Packers' training camp, he enlisted in the United States Coast Guard to serve in World War II, from 1942 to 1945, and did not play for the team. After being discharged, he signed for the Chicago Rockets. However, in 1946, the Bears did a player swap with the Packers, sending Charley Mitchell to Green Bay to get Farris. He won the 1946 NFL Championship with the Bears. He continued playing for the team in the 1947 NFL season. On June 28, 1948, Farris was conditionally released by the Bears. The AAFC Rockets quickly signed him to play quarterback for them in the AAFC. In the 1948 AAFC season, the Rockets went 1–13, finishing last in the AAFC Western Division. Farris retired after that season. During his career he was 6 foot 1 inch tall, and weighed 185 pounds.

== Personal life ==
Farris was married to Thelma Saunders Farris. He then worked 30 years for A&P Tea Company and seven years for Lambert Marketing. Farris died on November 16, 2002, in Citrus Heights, California, aged 82.
