= Jim Daniell =

American football player (1918–1983)

- Daniell while at Ohio State University

No. 99, 40
- Position: Tackle

Personal information
- Born: April 10, 1918; Pittsburgh, Pennsylvania, U.S.
- Died: December 13, 1983 (aged 65); Pittsburgh, Pennsylvania, U.S.
- Listed height: 6 ft 2 in (1.88 m)
- Listed weight: 230 lb (104 kg)

Career information
- High school: Mt. Lebanon (Pittsburgh); Kiski School (Saltsburg, Pennsylvania)
- College: Ohio State (1938–1941)
- NFL draft: 1942: 12th round, 110th overall pick

Career history
- Chicago Bears (1945); Cleveland Browns (1946)

Awards and highlights
- AAFC championship; Second-team All-Pro (1945); All-American (1941); Second-team All-Big Ten (1941)

Career NFL statistics
- Games played: 21
- Games started: 14
- Fumble recoveries: 1
- Stats at Pro Football Reference
- College Football Hall of Fame

James Lachlan Daniell (April 10, 1918 – December 13, 1983), nicknamed "Big Jim", was an American professional football offensive tackle and defensive tackle, a World War II veteran, and a steel company executive. He played two years in the National Football League (NFL) and All-America Football Conference (AAFC).

Daniell played high school football for Mt. Lebanon High School and The Kiski School in Pennsylvania. After graduating, he attended Ohio State University and played college football for the Ohio State Buckyes between 1938 and 1941. He was selected in the 12th round of the 1942 NFL draft by the Chicago Bears, but delayed a professional career to work for his family's steel business and serve in the U.S. Navy during World War II. Daniell was deployed in the Pacific theater and fought in the Battle of Okinawa. He rose to the rank of lieutenant and was awarded numerous service stars for his combat role.

After the war, Daniell played for the Bears in part of the 1945 season before joining the AAFC's Cleveland Browns the following year, serving as the team's first captain. While the Browns reached the AAFC championship in 1946, Daniell was kicked off the team before the title game by head coach Paul Brown when he was arrested following a confrontation with Cleveland police. Daniell left football after the season and became a steel company executive in Pennsylvania. He was elected to the College Football Hall of Fame in 1977. He was elected to the Ohio State Varsity O Hall of Fame in 2013.

== Early life ==
Daniell grew up in Mt. Lebanon, Pennsylvania, a suburb of Pittsburgh and attended Mt. Lebanon High School. In 1936, he transferred to The Kiski School in Saltsburg, Pennsylvania, a boarding school where he played as a tackle on the football team.

== College and military career ==
After graduating from high school, Daniell went to Ohio State University and played tackle for the Ohio State Buckeyes football team beginning as a sophomore in 1939. He played on Ohio State teams that won the Big Ten Conference championship in 1939 and had a 6–1–1 record in 1941. As a senior in 1941, Daniell blocked a punt in a game against Purdue University that resulted in a safety and made the difference in a 16–14 victory. He was named an All-American after the season.

Daniell was selected by the Chicago Bears in the 12th round of the 1942 NFL draft, but he delayed his professional career to go back to Pittsburgh and work at the Alloy Manufacturing Company, which his father founded in the 1930s and he and his brother operated. After America's involvement in World War II intensified following the attack on Pearl Harbor in 1941, Daniell entered the U.S. Navy and was sent to fight in the Pacific War. Daniell was stationed aboard two destroyers that were sunk. In one battle he and his men shot down 23 planes in an hour and 20 minutes, which was thought to be a record for a single engagement. Daniell rose to the rank of lieutenant during his 45 months in the Navy and participated in the Battle of Okinawa. He earned a Silver Star, a Bronze Star, a Presidential Unit Citation and several more service stars.

== Professional career ==
Daniell was discharged from the Navy in late 1945 and spent part of one season playing for the Bears. He was named a second-team All-Pro despite playing only seven games. He signed with the Cleveland Browns in late 1945 as the team, coached by Paul Brown, built up a roster for its first season in the All-America Football Conference. Daniell's salary was $9,000 a year ($148,592 in 2025 dollars), plus $1,000 for serving as the Browns' first captain as the team finished the 1946 season with a 12–2 record and earned a spot in the AAFC championship.

Before the AAFC championship game in December, Daniell was arrested along with teammates Lou Rymkus and Mac Speedie following an altercation with Cleveland police. Speedie, Rymkus, Daniell and Edgar Jones were drinking and waiting for Speedie's wife to arrive on a flight from Utah. They dropped Jones off and came up behind a police car that was blocking their way. Daniell, who was driving the car, honked the horn. An argument ensued that ended with the arrest of all three men. Daniell was booked on public intoxication, and Speedie and Rymkus were charged with creating a disturbance. Paul Brown fired Daniell after the incident, saying he had "a special obligation to be exemplary in his behavior" because he was the team captain. The Browns went on to beat the AAFC's New York Yankees for the title in 1946.

Daniell was traded to the AAFC's Chicago Rockets in 1947 along with end John Harrington for halfback Bill Boedeker, but he did not play in a game for the Rockets.

== Later life and death ==
Following his football career, Daniell went back to Mt. Lebanon and coached football at his old high school while working as a steel company executive. He was inducted into the College Football Hall of Fame in 1977; his brother Ave Daniell also made it to the hall of fame, having starred as a tackle for the University of Pittsburgh. Daniell was also inducted into the Ohio State Varsity O Hall of Fame in 2013. He died in 1983.
