= Bob Motl =

American football player (1920–2007)

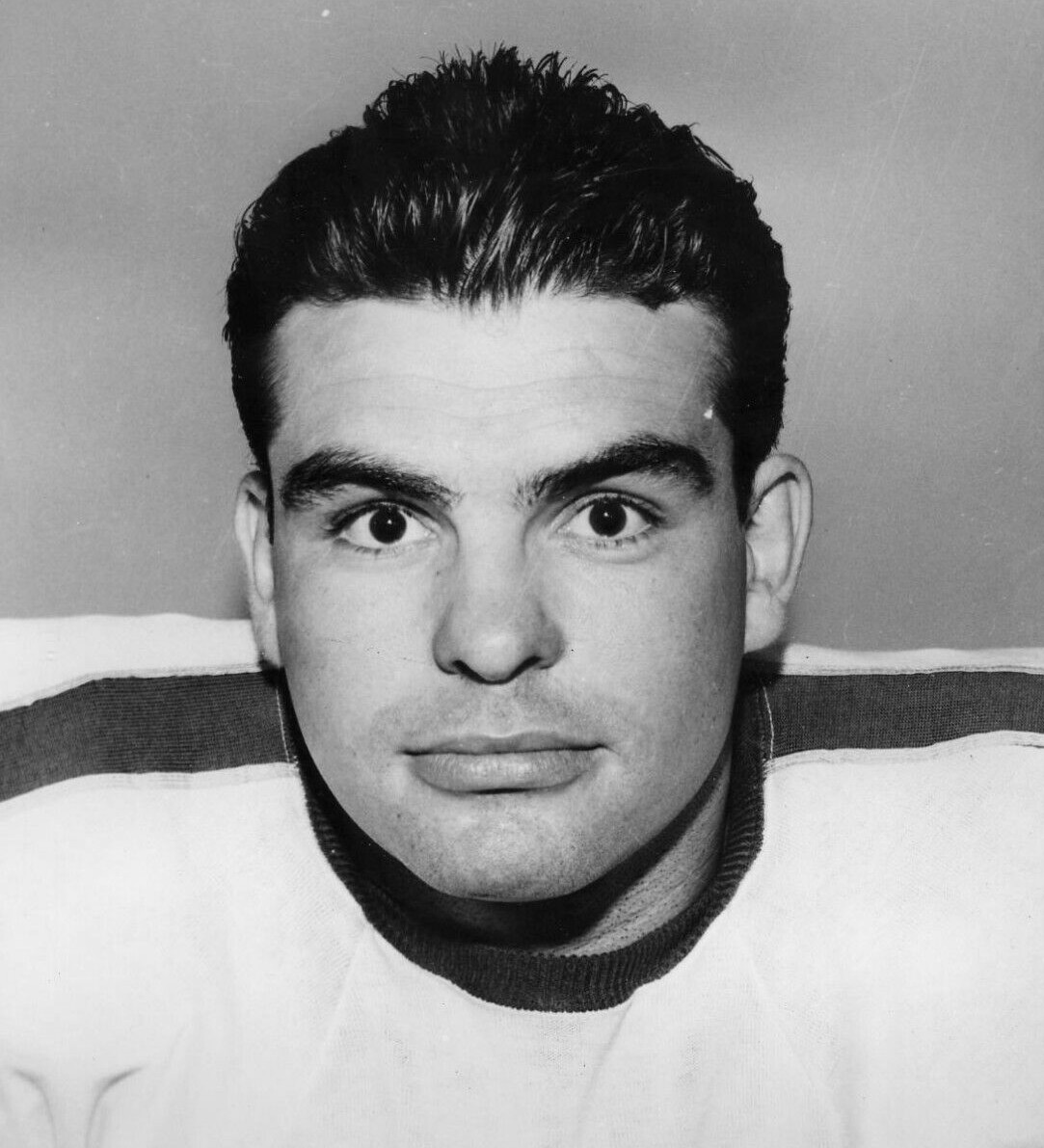
- Motl, circa 1946

No. 54
- Position: End

Personal information
- Born: July 26, 1920; Chicago, Illinois, U.S.
- Died: June 3, 2007 (aged 86); Orland Park, Illinois, U.S.
- Listed height: 6 ft 3 in (1.91 m)
- Listed weight: 195 lb (88 kg)

Career information
- High school: Austin (Chicago)
- College: Northwestern (1939–1942)
- NFL draft: 1943: 9th round, 80th overall pick

Career history
- Chicago Rockets (1946)

Awards and highlights
- Third-team All-American (1941); First-team All-Big Ten (1941)

Career AAFC statistics
- Receptions: 9
- Receiving yards: 124
- Touchdowns: 1
- Stats at Pro Football Reference

Robert Joseph Motl (July 26, 1920 – June 3, 2007) was an American professional football end in the All-America Football Conference (AAFC) for the Chicago Rockets. He played college football at Northwestern University and was drafted in the ninth round of the 1943 NFL draft by the Washington Redskins.
