= Bruce Smith (halfback) =

American football player (1920–1967)

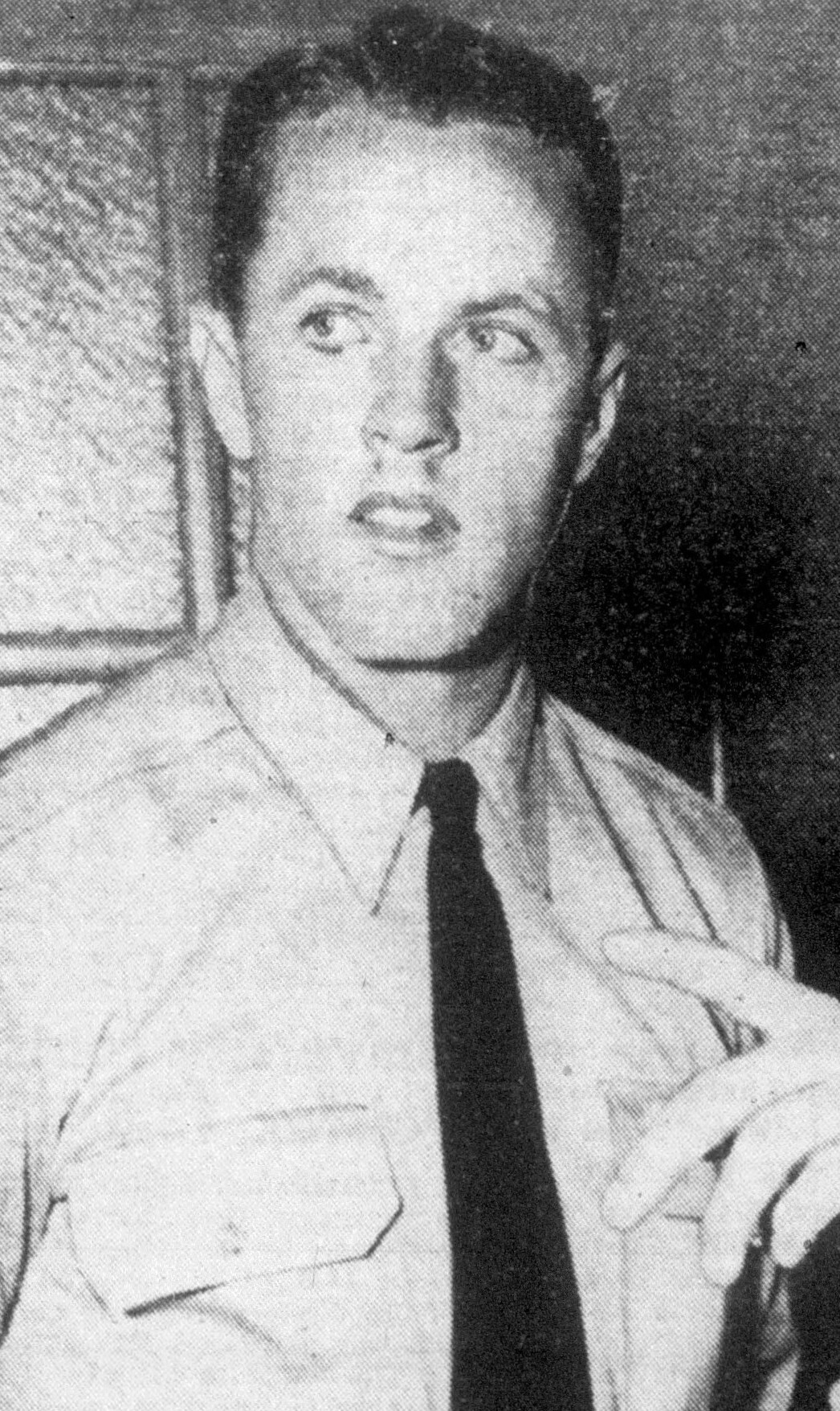
- Smith in 1943

No. 42, 65
- Position: Halfback

Personal information
- Born: February 8, 1920; Faribault, Minnesota, U.S.
- Died: August 28, 1967 (aged 47); Alexandria, Minnesota, U.S.
- Listed height: 6 ft 0 in (1.83 m)
- Listed weight: 197 lb (89 kg)

Career information
- High school: Faribault
- College: Minnesota (1939–1941)
- NFL draft: 1942: 13th round, 119th overall pick

Career history
- Green Bay Packers (1945–1948); Los Angeles Rams (1948)

Awards and highlights
- 2× National champion (1940, 1941); Heisman Trophy (1941); Consensus All-American (1941); First-team All-Big Ten (1941); Second-team All-Big Ten (1940); Minnesota Golden Gophers No. 54 retired

Career NFL statistics
- Rushing yards: 560
- Rushing average: 5.2
- Rushing touchdowns: 1
- Receptions: 8
- Receiving yards: 79
- Receiving touchdowns: 1
- Stats at Pro Football Reference
- College Football Hall of Fame

Bruce Phillip Smith (February 8, 1920 – August 28, 1967), nicknamed "Boo", was an American professional football halfback. He played college football for the Minnesota Golden Gophers, where he won the Heisman Trophy in 1941.

== Biography ==
Smith was born in Faribault, Minnesota, where he excelled in high school football under the coach Win Brockmeyer at Faribault High School. The football field at Faribault High is now named after Smith. He also played basketball.

Smith attended the University of Minnesota. His father, Lucius Smith, had played for the Golden Gophers in 1910, losing 6-0 in the championship to the University of Michigan. His son, Bruce Smith played for the back-to-back national champion Gophers in 1940 and 1941. In 1940, Smith faced off against Michigan in the national championship, the same as his father, and was key in giving Minnesota a 7-6 advantage to win the game.

He was coached by Bernie Bierman who said, "My feeling in regard to Bruce is this — as a player, he did more to bring football glory to Minnesota than any player ever has." Smith was a starter on both offense and defense, and was captain of the undefeated 1941 Minnesota team. Smith earned first-team All-American and All-Big Ten Conference honors in 1941.

Smith won the 1941 Heisman Trophy two days after the attack on Pearl Harbor. At the time, he was the first and only Minnesota player to receive the award.

During World War II, he served as a United States Navy fighter pilot. After the war, he played in the National Football League (NFL) with the Green Bay Packers (1945–1948) and the Los Angeles Rams (1948).

The movie Smith of Minnesota was released in 1942. The premiere occurred in his home town of Faribault, Minnesota, to the amazement of the locals due to this novelty. However, laughter was heard in the movie house when certain advanced technologies, for that time (direct-dial phones, streetlights, etc.) were seen as part of the scenery—courtesy of being filmed in Hollywood, Los Angeles.

Following his Navy service, Smith returned to Faribault. He and his family moved to Alexandria, Minnesota in 1964. Smith was diagnosed with cancer in the spring of 1967, and he spent the next several months visiting young cancer patients with the Rev. William Cantwell. Smith lost over half his body weight before succumbing to the disease.

== Posthumous honors ==
Rev. Cantwell, who was unfamiliar with Smith's sports achievements, nominated Smith for sainthood.

In 1972, Smith was inducted into the College Football Hall of Fame. His number 54 was the first to be officially retired by the Minnesota Gophers in 1977. In 1986, Smith was inducted into the Minnesota Sports Hall of Fame. As of 2018, Faribault High School displayed a bust and memorabilia of Smith outside their gymnasium.
