= Bob Ingalls =

American football player and coach (1919–1970)

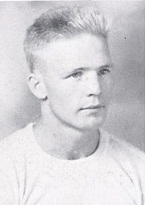
- Ingalls from 1946 Cornhusker

No. 53
- Position: Center

Personal information
- Born: January 17, 1919; Marblehead, Massachusetts, U.S.
- Died: April 8, 1970 (aged 51); Willimantic, Connecticut, U.S.
- Listed height: 6 ft 3 in (1.91 m)
- Listed weight: 200 lb (91 kg)

Career information
- High school: Marblehead; Kiski School (Saltsburg, Pennsylvania)
- College: Michigan (1938–1941)
- NFL draft: 1942: 18th round, 169th overall pick

Career history

Playing
- Green Bay Packers (1942)

Coaching
- Lincoln AAF (1944) Head coach; Nebraska (1945) Centers coach; Kansas (1946–1947) Line coach; Navy (1948–1949) Line coach; Connecticut (1950–1951) Line coach; Connecticut (1952–1963) Head coach

Awards and highlights
- First-team All-Big Ten (1941)

Career NFL statistics
- Games played–started: 10–6
- Interceptions: 1
- Touchdowns: 1
- Stats at Pro Football Reference

Head coaching record
- Career: 55–55–3 (.500)

Donald Robert Ingalls (January 17, 1919 – April 8, 1970) was an American professional football player and coach. He played college football at the University of Michigan and was chosen by conference coaches as a second-team player on the Associated Press All-Big Ten Conference team in 1940. He was drafted by the Green Bay Packers in the 18th round of the 1942 NFL draft and played professionally in the National Football League (NFL) for the Packers for one season, in 1942. Ingalls was the head coach of the 1944 Lincoln Army Air Field Wings football team. He served as the head football coach at the University of Connecticut from 1952 to 1963, compiling a record of 49–54–3.

Ingalls died on April 8, 1970, at Windham Community Hospital in Willimantic, Connecticut.

== Head coaching record ==
Year	Team	Overall	Conference	Standing	Bowl/playoffs
Lincoln Army Air Field Wings (Independent) (1944)
1944	Lincoln AAF	6–1			
Lincoln AAF:		6–1			
Connecticut Huskies (Yankee Conference) (1952–1963)
1952	Connecticut	5–3	3–1	T–1st	
1953	Connecticut	3–4–1	2–1–1	3rd	
1954	Connecticut	1–8	0–4	6th	
1955	Connecticut	4–4	2–2	T–3rd	
1956	Connecticut	6–2–1	3–0–1	1st	
1957	Connecticut	5–4–1	3–0–1	T–1st	
1958	Connecticut	7–3	4–0	1st	
1959	Connecticut	6–3	4–0	1st	
1960	Connecticut	5–4	3–1	T–1st	
1961	Connecticut	2–7	2–2	3rd	
1962	Connecticut	3–6	2–2	3rd	
1963	Connecticut	2–6	1–3	5th	
Connecticut:		49–54–3	29–16–3		
Total:		55–55–3			
National championship Conference title Conference division title or championship game berth
