= Fritz Crisler =

American football coach (1899–1982)

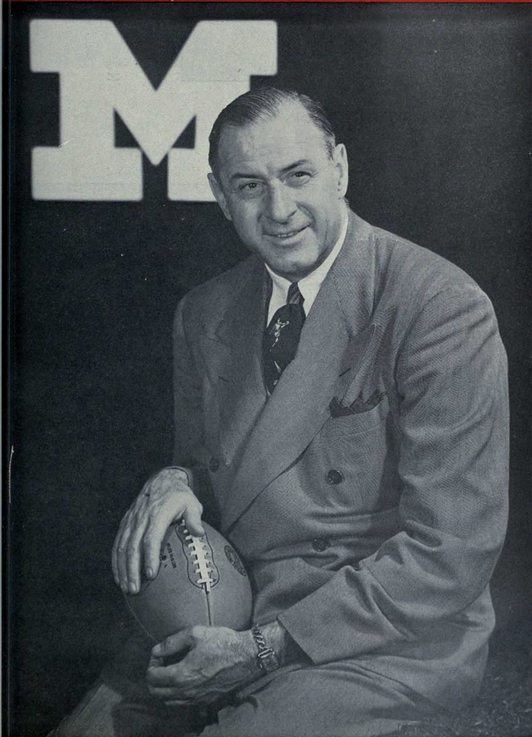
- Crisler from 1948 Michiganensian

Biographical details
- Born: January 12, 1899; Earlville, Illinois, U.S.
- Died: August 19, 1982 (aged 83); Ann Arbor, Michigan, U.S.

Playing career

Football
- 1919–1921: Chicago
- Position: End

Coaching career (HC unless noted)

Football
- 1922–1929: Chicago (assistant)
- 1930–1931: Minnesota
- 1932–1937: Princeton
- 1938–1947: Michigan

Basketball
- 1932–1934: Princeton

Baseball
- 1927–1929: Chicago

Administrative career (AD unless noted)
- 1930–1932: Minnesota
- 1941–1968: Michigan

Head coaching record
- Overall: 116–32–9 (football); 32–11 (basketball); 22–25 (baseball)
- Bowls: 1–0

Accomplishments and honors

Championships
- Football; 3 national (1933, 1935, 1947); 2 Big Ten (1943, 1947)

Awards
- First-team All-American (1921); First-team All-Big Ten (1921); AFCA Coach of the Year (1947); Amos Alonzo Stagg Award (1979)
- College Football Hall of Fame; Inducted in 1954 (profile)

Herbert Orin "Fritz" Crisler (/ˈkraɪslər/ KRY-slər; January 12, 1899 – August 19, 1982) was an American college football coach who is best known as "the father of two-platoon football", an innovation in which separate units of players were used for offense and defense. Crisler developed two-platoon football while serving as head coach at the University of Michigan from 1938 to 1947. He also coached at the University of Minnesota (1930–1931) and Princeton University (1932–1937). Before coaching, he played football at the University of Chicago under Amos Alonzo Stagg, who nicknamed him Fritz after violinist Fritz Kreisler.

During his 18-year career as a head football coach, Crisler's teams won 116 games, lost 32, and tied 9. At Michigan, Crisler won 71 games, lost 16, and tied 3 for a winning percentage of .806. Crisler introduced the distinctive winged football helmet to the Michigan Wolverines in 1938. The Michigan football team has worn a version of the design ever since. Crisler had first introduced the winged helmet design at Princeton in 1935. He was also the head basketball coach at Princeton for two seasons from 1932 to 1934, tallying a mark of 32–11.

Crisler's 1947 Michigan Wolverines football team, dubbed the "Mad Magicians," had an undefeated campaign, ending with a 49–0 triumph over the USC Trojans in the 1948 Rose Bowl. Afterwards, the team was selected the national champion by the Associated Press in an unprecedented post-bowl vote. Crisler retired from coaching after the 1947 season and served as the University of Michigan's athletic director from 1941 to 1968. Crisler was also a member of the NCAA football rules committee for 41 years and its chairman for nine years.

Crisler Center, home of the Michigan men's and women's basketball teams, was renamed in honor of Crisler in 1970. In addition, one "extra" seat in Michigan Stadium was added to honor Crisler for his special place in the history of Michigan football. However, its location is unknown.

== University of Chicago athlete ==
Crisler was born in Earlville, Illinois in 1899. He participated in football at Mendota High School and was an outstanding student. Articles in the October 7, 1915 and October 19, 1916 Sun Bulletins of Mendota, Illinois, show him to be a powerful football player who "sent shivers up and down the spinal columns of the opposing team." Crisler enrolled at the University of Chicago on an academic scholarship with plans to become a doctor. Crisler often told the story of his introduction to college football. Crisler recalled that he wandered over to the football field as a freshman, where he saw the legendary coach Amos Alonzo Stagg directing a practice session. According to Crisler, Stagg knocked him over on the sideline while trying to get out of the way of an end sweep play. Stagg reportedly told the diminutive Crisler, "If you're going to play football, why don't you put on a suit?" Crisler worked out with the football team for a few days, but gave it up to return to his studies. When Stagg encountered Crisler a short time later on campus, Stagg said, "I would have never picked you for a quitter." Crisler recalled that he returned to the team in response to Stagg's taunt and noted, "I've been in athletics ever since." Stagg was also responsible for Crisler's nickname. After Crisler fouled up four consecutive plays during a practice session, Stagg told him, "Crisler, from now on you are 'Fritz' after the master violinist. Not because you resemble him, but because you are so different."

Crisler played at the end position for Stagg's Chicago Maroons from 1919 to 1921. In 1921, he was selected as a first-team All-American by Walter Eckersall, a second-team All-American by Football World (based on a poll of 267 coaches), and a third-team All-American by Walter Camp. Crisler became an all-around athletic star at the University of Chicago, winning a total of nine varsity letters, three each in football, baseball and basketball. Based on his achievements in multiple sports, Crisler was awarded the Big Ten Medal of Honor, one of the most prestigious conference awards in college athletics.

== Football coach ==
=== Chicago (1922–1929) ===
After receiving his degree from the University of Chicago in 1922, Crisler accepted a position as assistant coach at his alma mater, working as an assistant to his mentor, Amos Alonzo Stagg. Crisler remained an assistant coach at Chicago for eight years. By 1925, he was also an assistant athletic director at Chicago and was reportedly "being groomed to replace Old Man Stagg, when the veteran coach retires."

=== Minnesota (1930–1931) ===
In 1930, Crisler was hired as the athletic director and head football coach at the University of Minnesota. Crisler was the head coach of the Minnesota Golden Gophers football program for two seasons in 1930 and 1931. In the 1930 season, Crisler's team won three games, lost four and tied one. Guard Biggie Munn was awarded the Team MVP Award. In 1931, Crisler's team improved to a record of 7–3. Munn was named a first-team All-American in 1931 and received the Chicago Tribune Silver Football as the most valuable player of the Big Ten. Munn later became Crisler's rival as the football coach at Michigan State University from 1947 to 1953.

=== Princeton (1932–1937) ===
Crisler was the head football coach at Princeton from 1932 to 1937 where he compiled a record of 35–9–5. Two of his teams, the 1933 and 1935 teams, compiled perfect 9–0 records and were recognized by some as national champions. The 1933 team was invited to the Rose Bowl, but administration turned down the offer. Columbia, which had lost only one game, to Princeton, accepted the invitation and defeated Stanford. Crisler introduced two innovations that later came into general usage. The first was his development of a faster starting stance for offensive linemen, and the second was a practice of having his quarterback stand apart from the huddle until ready to call a play.

=== Michigan (1938–1947) ===
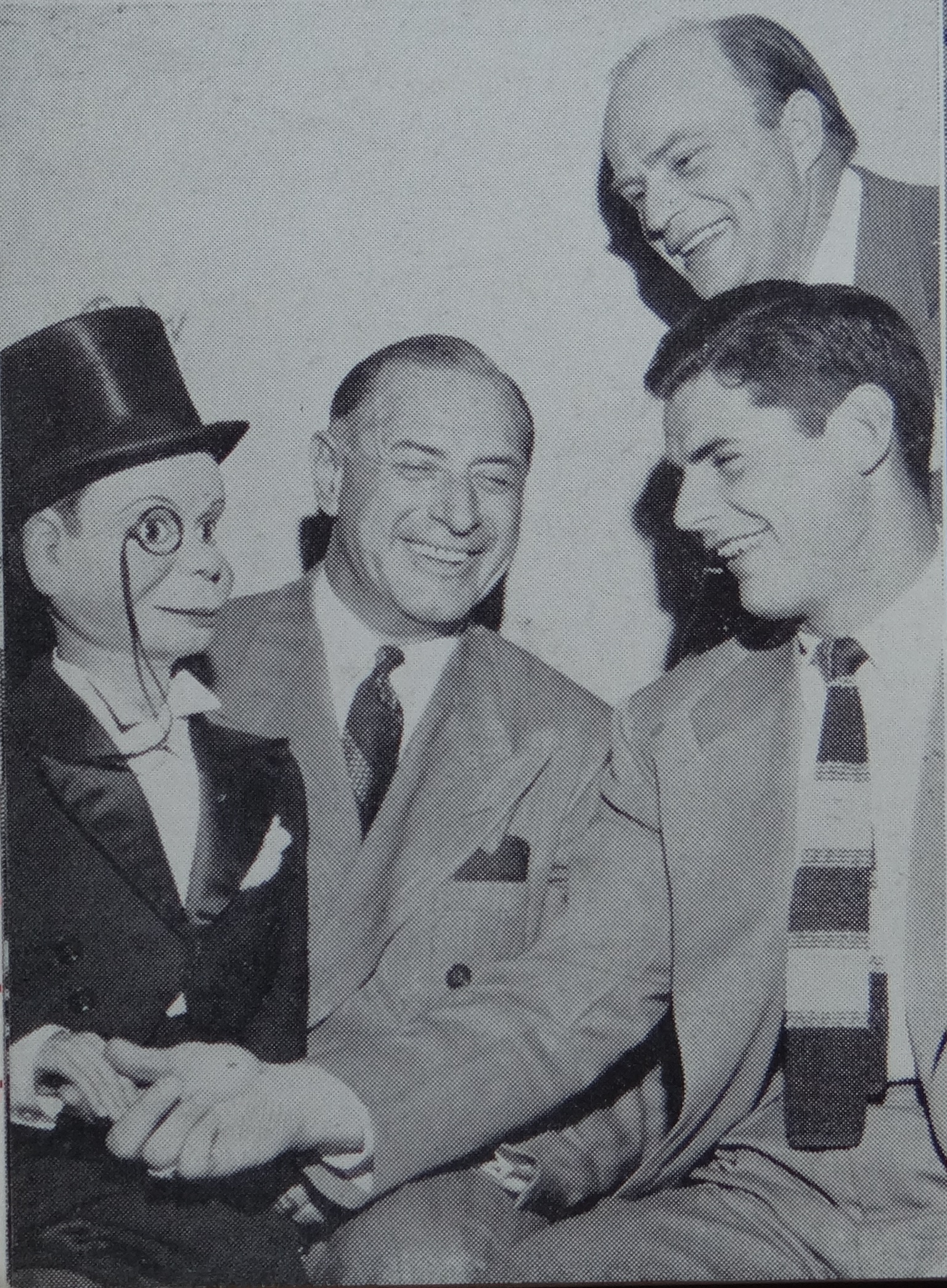
Crisler and Bob Chappuis pose with Edgar Bergen and Charlie McCarthy prior to 1948 Rose Bowl.

Crisler served as Michigan's head football coach from 1938 to 1947. When he took over as head coach at Michigan in 1938, Crisler introduced the distinctive winged football helmet which has since become one of the symbols of Michigan Wolverines athletics programs. Crisler developed a similar winged helmet pattern in 1935 while coaching at Princeton. At Michigan, he added to the innovation by painting the helmets maize and blue, thus highlighting the winged pattern. Crisler created the distinctive design to help his halfbacks find receivers downfield. Crisler later recalled, "There was a tendency to use different colored helmets just for receivers in those days, but I always thought that would be as helpful for the defense as for the offense."

In his ten years as coach, the Wolverines compiled a record of 71–16–3. His Michigan teams finished lower than second in the Big Ten Conference only twice. The 1943 team won the school's first Big Ten championship in ten years with an 8–1 record, losing only to Notre Dame, a game which would spark another 30 years of Michigan refusing to schedule a game against Notre Dame. His 80.5 winning percentage ranks him second in school history behind only Fielding H. Yost (minimum 50 games coached).

Crisler's most noted players at Michigan included Heisman Trophy winner Tom Harmon, Bob Chappuis, Forest Evashevski (who later became athletic director at Iowa), Bump Elliott, Pete Elliott, Albert Wistert, Bob Westfall, Ed Frutig, and Julius Franks.

While coaching at Michigan, Crisler developed the platoon system in which separate groups play offense and defense. He unveiled the system in 1945 in a game played at Yankee Stadium against Army. Before Crisler switched to the platoon system, players handled both offensive and defensive duties with only occasional substitutions. Using a single wing formation, Crisler also conceived the buck lateral series and the spinning fullback play.

Crisler's greatest success as head football coach at Michigan came with the 1947 Michigan Wolverines football team. The 1947 team, known as the "Mad Magicians" due to Crisler's complex shifts, stunts, and schemes, went undefeated and untied with a 10–0 record. Though ranked #2 in the Associated Press poll at the end of the regular season, the Wolverines defeated the USC Trojans by a score of 49–0 in the 1948 Rose Bowl game, and were selected as the nation's #1 team by a 226–119 margin over Notre Dame in an unprecedented post-bowl Associated Press poll. The 1947 team has been selected as the best team in the history of Michigan football. Led by team captain, Bruce Hilkene, quarterback Howard Yerges, and All-American halfbacks Bob Chappuis and Bump Elliott, the 1947 Wolverines outscored their opponents, 394–53. The Wolverines victory in the 1948 Rose Bowl tied Michigan's final in the first ever 1902 Rose Bowl, as the most points scored, and the largest margin of victory, in the history of the "Granddaddy of Them All".

The 1947 Michigan team was also the first fully to embrace the concept of defensive and offensive specialization. Crisler established fully separate offensive and defensive squads. Only Bump Elliott and Jack Weisenberger played on both squads. In November 1947, Time magazine ran a feature article about the 1947 Wolverines (with Bob Chappuis’ photograph on the cover) called, "The Specialist." The Time article focused on the new era of specialization marked by Crisler's decision to field separate offensive and defensive units. The article noted: "Michigan's sleight-of-hand repertory is a baffling assortment of double reverses, buck-reverse laterals, crisscrosses, quick-hits and spins from seven different formations. Sometimes, watching from the side lines, even Coach Crisler isn't sure which Michigan man has the ball. Michigan plays one team on offense, one on defense . . . Whenever Michigan's defensive team regains the ball, Crisler orders: 'Offense unit, up and out,' and nine men pour onto the field at once."

One of the stars of the 1947 team, Dan Dworsky, went on to a career as an architect and designed Crisler Arena. Interviewed in 2007, Dworsky recalled: "Crisler was not only an intellectual in strategy, but also in the way he ran practices. . . . He ran practices rigidly and we called him 'The Lord.' He would allow it to rain, or not. He was a Douglas MacArthur-type figure, handsome and rigid. . . . I sculpted him and gave him the bust in 1971." Dworsky also kept another bust of Crisler in his office.

== University of Michigan athletic director (1941–1968) ==
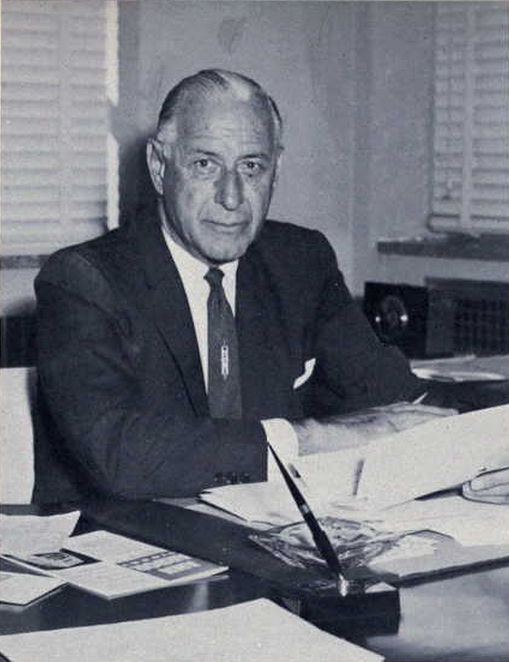
Crisler from 1962 Michiganensian

When Crisler was recruited from Princeton to Michigan, it was agreed that he would also take over as Michigan's athletic director when Fielding H. Yost retired. Yost retired in 1941, and Crisler became the athletic director at that time. He continued to hold that position for 27 years until his retirement in 1968. He was inducted into the College Football Hall of Fame in 1954.

During Crisler's tenure as athletic director, the university's athletic programs experienced a period of extraordinary success, in every branch of varsity sports. Highlights of the athletic programs during the 28 years of the Crisler era include the following:

- Hockey — seven national championships (1948, 1951–1953, 1955–1956, and 1964) and 12 appearances in the Frozen Four;
- Men's swimming — six national championships (1941, 1948, 1957–1959, 1961) and 25 finishes in the top four in the country;
- Football — two national championships (1947 and 1948), six Big Ten championships (1943, 1947–1950 and 1964) and three Rose Bowl victories (1948, 1951 and 1965);
- Baseball — two national championships (1953 and 1962) and ten Big Ten championships (1941–1942, 1944–1945, 1948–1950, 1952–1953 and 1961);
- Basketball — two appearances in the Final Four (1964 and 1965) and four Big Ten championships (1948 and 1964–1966);
- Men's gymnastics — one national championship (1963) and seven Big Ten championships (1961–1966 and 1968);
- Men's tennis — one national championship (1957) and 12 Big Ten championships (1941, 1944–1945, 1955–1962 and 1965–1966);
- Wrestling — 17 Big Ten championships (1943, 1944, 1951–1957, 1960–1967); and
- Track and field — 18 Big Ten team championships (11 indoor and 7 outdoor) and nine individual NCAA event championships

As athletic director, Crisler also led two expansions of Michigan Stadium, helping to make it the nation's largest college stadium. The first expansion in 1949 involved the installation of permanent steel stands around the stadium concourse, increasing the seating capacity to 97,239. In 1956, renovations expanded the seating capacity to more than 101,001. The 1956 expansion included 542 seats in a new communications center and 1,247 seats in a new press box. According to a newspaper article quoting an Athletic Department staff member, "Fritz wanted to end up with a figure of 100,001, but he came up with a thousand seats too many. But he still got that 001 at the end." Through subsequent renovations, Michigan has continued the tradition of ending official seating capacity numbers with the digit 1, and the final seat has been said to be reserved in Crisler's honor.

Crisler also invested revenues from the school's successful football program to build a $1 million pool for the women's swimming team, a men's varsity competition pool, a modern baseball grandstand and a large press box at Michigan Stadium.

With the success of the Michigan Wolverines men's basketball under the leadership of Cazzie Russell, Crisler led the effort to build a new basketball arena in the mid-1960s. The new arena was opened in 1967 at a cost of $7.2 million and with seating for 15,000. The new arena was originally named the University Events Building. In February 1970, the arena was renamed Crisler Arena in honor of Crisler.

At the time of Crisler's retirement in 1968, the Associated Press credited him with helping to "lift college football from a 'rah, rah' campus pastime in the 1930s into the modern multimillion dollar enterprise of today." Crisler was succeeded as Michigan's athletic director by Don Canham, whom Crisler had hired as the school's track coach in the late 1940s. At the time of his appointment, Canham noted that replacing Crisler was "a little like stepping up to bat after Babe Ruth."

== Later years ==
After retiring in 1968, Crisler continued to live in Ann Arbor. When Bo Schembechler took over as Michigan's football coach in 1969, he recalled that he went out of his way to get to know Crisler. Schembechler considered Crisler "a giant" and made time to go over to Crisler's house and sit in his basement, listening to Crisler's theories and stories. In 1978, Crisler and Fielding H. Yost became the first coaches inducted into the University of Michigan Athletic Hall of Honor; the only persons inducted ahead of Crisler and Yost were athletes, Gerald Ford, Bill Freehan, Tom Harmon, Ron Kramer, Bennie Oosterbaan, Cazzie Russell, and Bob Ufer. He died in Ann Arbor in 1982 at age 83. He had been hospitalized twice in his final months, once for pneumonia.

== Head coaching record ==
=== Football ===
Year	Team	Overall	Conference	Standing	Bowl/playoffs	AP^{#}
Minnesota Golden Gophers (Big Ten Conference) (1930–1931)
1930	Minnesota	3–4–1	1–3	T–6th		
1931	Minnesota	7–3	3–2	5th		
Minnesota:		10–7–1	4–5			
Princeton Tigers (Independent) (1932–1937)
1932	Princeton	2–2–3				
1933	Princeton	9–0				
1934	Princeton	7–1				
1935	Princeton	9–0				
1936	Princeton	4–2–2				
1937	Princeton	4–4				
Princeton:		35–9–5				
Michigan Wolverines (Big Ten Conference) (1938–1947)
1938	Michigan	6–1–1	3–1–1	T–2nd		16
1939	Michigan	6–2	3–2	T–3rd		20
1940	Michigan	7–1	3–1	2nd		3
1941	Michigan	6–1–1	3–1–1	T–2nd		5
1942	Michigan	7–3	3–2	T–3rd		9
1943	Michigan	8–1	6–0	T–1st		3
1944	Michigan	8–2	5–2	2nd		8
1945	Michigan	7–3	5–1	2nd		6
1946	Michigan	6–2–1	5–1–1	2nd		6
1947	Michigan	10–0	6–0	1st	W Rose	2
Michigan:		71–16–3	42–11–3			
Total:		116–32–9				
National championship Conference title Conference division title or championship game berth
^{#}Rankings from final AP Poll.

=== Basketball ===
Record table
Season	Team	Overall	Conference	Standing	Postseason
Princeton Tigers (Eastern Intercollegiate Basketball League) (1932–1934)
1932–33	Princeton	19–3	7–3	2nd	
1933–34	Princeton	13–8	7–5	T–3rd	
Princeton:		32–11	14–8		
Total:		32–11			

== Coaching tree ==
Played under:

- Amos Alonzo Stagg: Chicago (1919–1921)

Coached under:

- Amos Alonzo Stagg: Chicago (1922–1929)

Assistant coaches who became head coaches:

- Archie Kodros: Whitman (1949–1950), Hawaii (1951) (Kodros also played for Crisler at Michigan)
- Biggie Munn: Syracuse (1946), Michigan State (1947–1953) (Munn also played for Crisler at Minnesota)
- Bennie Oosterbaan: Michigan (1948–1958)
- Arthur Valpey: Harvard (1948–1949), Connecticut (1950–1951)

Former players who went on to become head coaches

- Jerry Burns: Iowa (1961–1965), Minnesota Vikings (1986–1991)
- Wally Dreyer: Wisconsin–Milwaukee (1960–1969)
- Bump Elliott: Michigan (1959–1968)
- Pete Elliott: Nebraska (1956), California (1957–1959), Illinois (1960–1966), Miami (FL) (1973–1974)
- Forest Evashevski: Washington State (1950–1951), Iowa (1952–1960)
- Bob Hollway: St. Louis Cardinals (1971–1972)
- Bob Ingalls: Connecticut (1952–1963)
- Ralph Kohl: Franklin (1955–1956), Eastern Illinois (1957–1964)
- David M. Nelson: Hillsdale (1946–1947), Maine (1949–1950), Delaware (1951–1965)
- Jack Petoskey: Hillsdale (1949–1950), Western Michigan (1953–1956)
- Tubby Raymond: Delaware (1966–2001)
- Fred Trosko: Eastern Michigan (1952–1964)
- Jack Wink: Stout State (1952–1955), St. Cloud State (1956–1964)
- Irv Wisniewski: Hillsdale (1951)

== See also ==
- List of presidents of the American Football Coaches Association
- University of Michigan Athletic Hall of Honor
