= 1943 Green Bay Packers season =

NFL team season

- General manager: Curly Lambeau (Vice-President)
- President: L. H. Joannes
- Head coach: Curly Lambeau
- Home stadium: City Stadium; Wisconsin State Fair Park

Results
- Record: 7–2–1
- Division place: 2nd NFL Western
- Playoffs: Did not qualify

The 1943 Green Bay Packers season was their 25th overall and their 23rd season in the National Football League. The team finished with a 7–2–1 record under coach Curly Lambeau, earning a second-place finish in the Western Conference.

== Offseason ==
=== NFL draft ===
Round	Pick	Player	Position	School/Club Team
1	8	Dick Wildung	Tackle	Minnesota
3	23	Irv Comp	Back	Benedictine
5	38	Roy McKay	Back	Texas
6	48	Nick Susoeff	End	Washington State
7	58	Ken Snelling	Fullback	UCLA
8	68	Lester Gatewood	Center	Baylor
9	78	Norm Verry	Tackle	USC
10	88	Solon Barnett	Guard	Baylor
11	98	Bob Forte	Back	Arkansas
12	108	Van Davis	End	Georgia
13	118	Tom Brock	Center	Notre Dame
14	128	Ralph Tate	Back	Oklahoma State
15	138	Don Carlson	Tackle	Denver
16	148	Mike Welch	Back	Minnesota
17	158	Ron Thomas	Guard	USC
18	168	Jim Powers	Tackle	St. Mary's (CA)
19	178	Hal Prescott	Wide receiver	Hardin–Simmons
20	188	Eddie Forrest	Center	Santa Clara
21	198	Lloyd Wasserbach	Tackle	Wisconsin
22	208	Mark Hoskins	Back	Wisconsin
23	218	Earl Bennett	Guard	Hardin–Simmons
24	228	George Zellick	End	Oregon State
25	238	Gene Bierhaus	End	Minnesota
26	248	George Makris	Guard	Wisconsin
27	258	Pete Susick	Back	Washington
28	268	Bud Hasse	End	Northwestern
29	278	Dick Thornally	Tackle	Wisconsin
30	288	Bob Ray	Back	Wisconsin
31	293	Brunel Christensen	Tackle	California
32	298	Ken Roskie	Fullback	South Carolina

- Yellow indicates a future Pro Bowl selection

== Regular season ==
=== Schedule ===
Game	Date	Opponent	Result	Record	Venue	Attendance	Recap	Sources
1	September 26	**Chicago Bears**	**T** 21–21	0–0–1	City Stadium	23,675	Recap	
2	October 3	at **Chicago Cardinals**	**W** 28–7	1–0–1	Comiskey Park	15,563	Recap	
3	October 10	**Detroit Lions**	**W** 35–14	2–0–1	City Stadium	21,396	Recap	
4	October 17	Washington Redskins	**L** 7–33	2–1–1	State Fair Park	23,058	Recap	
5	October 24	at **Detroit Lions**	**W** 27–6	3–1–1	Briggs Stadium	41,463	Recap	
6	October 31	at New York Giants	**W** 35–21	4–1–1	Polo Grounds	46,208	Recap	
7	November 7	at **Chicago Bears**	**L** 7–21	4–2–1	Wrigley Field	43,425	Recap	
8	November 14	**Chicago Cardinals**	**W** 35–14	5–2–1	State Fair Park	10,831	Recap	
9	November 21	at Brooklyn Dodgers	**W** 31–7	6–2–1	Ebbets Field	18,992	Recap	
—	Bye							
10	December 5	at Steagles	**W** 38–28	7–2–1	Shibe Park	34,294	Recap	
Note: Intra-division opponents are in **bold** text.

== Standings ==
NFL Western Division
	W	L	T	PCT	DIV	PF	PA	STK
Chicago Bears	8	1	1	.889	5–0–1	303	157	W1
Green Bay Packers	7	2	1	.778	4–1–1	264	172	W3
Detroit Lions	3	6	1	.333	2–4	178	218	L2
Chicago Cardinals	0	10	0	.000	0–6	95	238	L10

Note: Tie games were not officially counted in the standings until 1972.

== Roster ==
1943 Green Bay Packers final roster
Backs: 16 Lou Brock RB/CB/P; 3 Tony Canadeo RB/CB; 51 Irv Comp RB/CB/P; 54 Larry Craig RB/S; 18 Tony Falkenstein FB/LB; 64 Ted Fritsch FB/LB; 8 Bob Kahler RB/CB; 23 Jim Lankas FB/LB; 24 Joe Laws RB/CB; 63 Ben Starret RB/S; 42 Andy Uram RB/CB; Ends/Receivers: 22 Dick Evans; 14 Don Hutson K; 48 Harry Jacunski; 7 Joel Mason	Linemen/Linebackers: 27 Chet Adams T/DT/K; 47 Paul Berezney T/DT; 29 Charley Brock C/LB; 75 Tiny Croft T/DT; 35 Bob Flowers C/LB; 46 Sherwood Fries G/DG; 43 Buckets Goldenberg G/DG; 45 Bill Kuusisto G/DG; 72 Forrest McPherson C/LB/T/DT; 44 Baby Ray T/DT; 58 Tar Schwammel T/DT; 33 Glen Sorenson G/DG; 21 Pete Tinsley G/DG; Rookies in italics
