= List of NFL players (F) =

This is a list of players who have appeared in at least one regular season or postseason game in the National Football League (NFL), American Football League (AFL), or All-America Football Conference (AAFC) and have a last name that starts with "F". This list is accurate through the end of the 2025 NFL season.

== Fa ==
- Daniel Faalele
- Nuu Faaola
- Anthony Fabiano
- Jason Fabini
- Tayo Fabuluje
- Kyler Fackrell
- Brandon Facyson
- Rob Fada
- Julian Fagan
- Kevin Fagan
- Demarcus Faggins
- Carl Fagioli
- John Fahay
- Jim Fahnhorst
- Keith Fahnhorst
- Fred Failing
- Richard Fain
- Jeff Faine
- Carl Fair
- Terry Fair
- Kaʻimi Fairbairn
- Bill Fairband
- Don Fairbanks
- Dylan Fairchild
- Greg Fairchild
- Paul Fairchild
- Art Faircloth
- Leonard Fairley
- Nick Fairley
- Eric Fairs
- Derrick Faison
- Earl Faison
- Nello Falaschi
- Dick Falcon
- Guil Falcon
- Terry Falcon
- David Fales
- Luke Falk
- Tony Falkenstein
- Mickey Fallon
- Mike Falls
- Gary Famiglietti
- Paul Fanaika
- Alan Faneca
- Jonathan Fanene
- Hebron Fangupo
- Chad Fann
- Harold Fannin Jr.
- Mike Fanning
- Stan Fanning
- George Fant
- Noah Fant
- Princeton Fant
- Ken Fantetti
- Ledio Fanucchi
- Mike Fanucci
- Austin Faoliu
- Chris Farasopoulos
- Hap Farber
- Justin Fargas
- Nick Farina
- Andy Farkas
- Caleb Farley
- Dale Farley
- Dick Farley
- John Farley
- Matthias Farley
- Dick Farman
- Andrew Farmer
- Danny Farmer
- Dave Farmer
- George Farmer (born 1948)
- George Farmer (born 1958)
- George Farmer (born 1993)
- Joshua Farmer
- Karl Farmer
- Lonnie Farmer
- Ray Farmer
- Robert Farmer
- Roger Farmer
- Ted Farmer
- Tom Farmer
- Matt Farniok
- John Farquhar
- D'Marco Farr
- Mel Farr
- Mel Farr, Jr.
- Mike Farr
- Miller Farr
- Ken Farragut
- Venice Farrar
- Dillon Farrell
- Luke Farrell
- Neil Farrell Jr.
- Scrapper Farrell
- Sean Farrell
- Paul Farren
- Curt Farrier
- Bo Farrington
- James Farrior
- Jimmy Farris
- John Farris
- Kris Farris
- Rojesterman Farris
- Tom Farris
- Kenneth Farrow
- Heath Farwell
- Brett Faryniarz
- Randy Fasani
- Anthony Fasano
- Olumuyiwa Fashanu
- Ciatrick Fason
- Greg Fassitt
- Mario Fatafehi
- T. J. Fatinikun
- Folorunso Fatukasi
- Olakunle Fatukasi
- Chuck Faucette
- Kevin Faulk
- Marshall Faulk
- Trev Faulk
- Chris Faulkner
- Jeff Faulkner
- Staley Faulkner
- Ta'ase Faumui
- Wilson Faumuina
- Christian Fauria
- Joseph Fauria
- Ron Faurot
- Frank Fausch
- Dick Faust
- George Faust
- Paul Faust
- Troy Fautanu
- Hal Faverty
- Greg Favors
- Brett Favre
- Calvin Favron
- Jake Fawcett
- Doc Fay
- John Faylor
- Jermaine Fazande
- Ron Fazio

== Fe–Ff ==
- Ricky Feacher
- Wiley Feagin
- Jeff Feagles
- Tom Feamster
- Tom Fears
- Willie Fears
- Grant Feasel
- Greg Feasel
- Bill Feaster
- Tavien Feaster
- Tiny Feather
- Beattie Feathers
- Terrence Fede
- Creig Federico
- Daniel Federkeil
- John Federovitch
- Joe Federspiel
- Walt Fedora
- Gerry Feehery
- A. J. Feeley
- Jay Feely
- Al Feeney
- Dan Feeney
- Howard Feggins
- Nick Feher
- Breiden Fehoko
- Simi Fehoko
- Bernie Feibish
- Andy Feichtinger
- Matt Feiler
- Ray Feinga
- Lou Feist
- Clayton Fejedelem
- Gene Fekete
- John Fekete
- Nip Felber
- Bill Feldhaus
- Paul Feldhausen
- Todd Feldman
- Jon Feliciano
- Gene Felker
- Happy Feller
- Mark Fellows
- Ron Fellows
- Daniel Fells
- Darren Fells
- Dick Felt
- Demetric Felton
- Eric Felton
- Jerome Felton
- Joe Felton
- Ralph Felton
- Tai Felton
- Bobby Felts
- Tom Fena
- Gary Fencik
- Dick Fencl
- James Fenderson
- Chuck Fenenbock
- Gill Fenerty
- Bob Fenimore
- Carl Fennema
- Chandler Fenner
- Derrick Fenner
- Harold Fenner
- Lane Fenner
- Lee Fenner
- Rick Fenney
- Rashad Fenton
- James Ferentz
- Duke Fergerson
- Bill Ferguson
- Blake Ferguson
- Bob Ferguson
- Charley Ferguson
- D'Brickashaw Ferguson
- Ego Ferguson
- Gene Ferguson
- Howie Ferguson
- Jake Ferguson
- James Ferguson
- Jason Ferguson
- Jaylon Ferguson
- Joe Ferguson
- Josh Ferguson
- Keith Ferguson
- Kevin Ferguson
- Larry Ferguson
- Nick Ferguson
- Reid Ferguson
- Robert Ferguson
- Terrance Ferguson
- Tom Ferguson
- Vagas Ferguson
- Fritz Ferko
- Ron Fernandes
- Manny Fernandez
- Mervyn Fernandez
- Ethan Fernea
- Vince Ferragamo
- Jack Ferrante
- Orlando Ferrante
- Frank Ferrara
- Ron Ferrari
- Bill Ferrario
- Bob Ferrell
- Clelin Ferrell
- Earl Ferrell
- Diamond Ferri
- Neil Ferris
- Lou Ferry
- Paul Fersen
- Howard Fest
- Jim Fetherston
- Gus Fetz
- Maurice Ffrench

== Fi ==
- John Fiala
- Tony Fiammetta
- Dan Ficca
- Leon Fichman
- Brad Fichtel
- Ross Fichtner
- Sam Ficken
- Thomas Fidone
- Bill Fiedler
- Jay Fiedler
- C. J. Fiedorowicz
- Amod Field
- Doak Field
- Harry Field
- Don Fielder
- Anthony Fieldings
- Aaron Fields
- Angelo Fields
- Anthony Fields
- Brandon Fields
- Carlos Fields
- DaMarcus Fields
- Edgar Fields
- Floyd Fields
- George Fields
- Greg Fields
- Jaime Fields
- Jeff Fields
- Jerry Fields
- Jitter Fields
- Joe Fields
- Justin Fields
- Mark Fields (born 1972)
- Mark Fields (born 1996)
- Ronald Fields
- Scott Fields
- Tony Fields
- Ralph Fife
- Bill Fifer
- Steve Fifita
- Cedric Figaro
- George Figner
- Deon Figures
- Yamon Figurs
- Dan Fike
- John Filak
- Frank Filchock
- Jim Files
- Bojay Filimoeatu
- Filip Filipović
- Steve Filipowicz
- Gene Filipski
- John Fina
- Bull Finch
- Karl Finch
- Sharif Finch
- Steve Finch
- Alfred Fincher
- Derek Fine
- Mike Fink
- Matt Finkes
- Jim Finks
- Jack Finlay
- A. J. Finley
- Clint Finley
- Jermichael Finley
- Ryan Finley
- Bernie Finn
- Jack Finn
- Jim Finn
- Cortland Finnegan
- James Finnegan
- Brian Finneran
- Gary Finneran
- B. J. Finney
- Roger Finnie
- Tom Finnin
- Russ Finsterwald
- Dave Finzer
- Dave Fiore
- Al Fiorentino
- Ed Fiorentino
- Anthony Firkser
- Bill Fischer
- Clarke Fischer
- Clete Fischer
- Mark Fischer
- Pat Fischer
- Joe Fishback
- Dick Fishel
- Blake Fisher
- Bob Fisher (born 1916)
- Bob Fisher (born 1958)
- Bryce Fisher
- Charles Fisher
- Darrell Fisher
- Doug Fisher
- Ed Fisher
- Eddie Fisher
- Eric Fisher
- Ev Fisher
- George Fisher
- Jake Fisher
- Jeff Fisher
- Levar Fisher
- Mike Fisher
- Ray Fisher
- Tony Fisher
- Travis Fisher
- Alec Fishman
- Bill Fisk
- Jason Fisk
- Tucker Fisk
- Braden Fiske
- Max Fiske
- Galen Fiss
- Kylie Fitts
- France Fitzgerald
- Freeman Fitzgerald
- Greg Fitzgerald
- Jamie Fitzgerald
- Jim Fitzgerald
- Joe Fitzgerald
- John Fitzgerald
- Kevin Fitzgerald
- Larry Fitzgerald
- Mickey Fitzgerald
- Mike Fitzgerald
- Ryan Fitzgerald
- Paul Fitzgibbon
- Steve Fitzhugh
- Paul Fitzke
- Scott Fitzkee
- Dez Fitzpatrick
- James FitzPatrick
- John FitzPatrick
- Minkah Fitzpatrick
- Ryan Fitzpatrick
- Casey Fitzsimmons

== Fl ==
- Joe Flacco
- Jack Flagerman
- Terrence Flagler
- Dick Flaherty
- Harry Flaherty
- Pat Flaherty
- Ray Flaherty
- Tom Flaherty
- Dick Flanagan
- Ed Flanagan
- Hoot Flanagan
- Latham Flanagan
- Matt Flanagan
- Mike Flanagan
- Jim Flanigan
- Jim Flanigan, Sr.
- John Flannery
- Bill Flannigan
- Demetrius Flannigan-Fowles
- Paul Flatley
- Willie Flattery
- Jack Flavin
- P. J. Fleck
- Bill Fleckenstein
- Coby Fleener
- Jack Fleischman
- Cameron Fleming
- Cory Fleming
- Darius Fleming
- Don Fleming
- George Fleming
- Jamell Fleming
- Marv Fleming
- Troy Fleming
- Wilmer Fleming
- Zeron Flemister
- Ronald Flemons
- Mack Flenniken
- Andy Fletcher
- Arthur Fletcher
- Billy Fletcher
- Bradley Fletcher
- Bryan Fletcher
- Chris Fletcher
- Dane Fletcher
- Derrick Fletcher
- Donnie Fletcher
- Jamar Fletcher
- John Fletcher
- London Fletcher
- Oliver Fletcher
- Simon Fletcher
- Terrell Fletcher
- Tom Flick
- Paul Flinn
- Ryan Flinn
- George Flint
- Judson Flint
- Brian Flones
- Anthony Florence
- Drayton Florence
- Paul Florence
- Mike Flores
- Tom Flores
- Cordale Flott
- Ryan Flournoy
- Jim Flower
- Bernie Flowers
- Bob Flowers
- Brandon Flowers
- Charlie Flowers
- Dallis Flowers
- Dick Flowers
- Ereck Flowers
- Erik Flowers
- Keith Flowers
- Kenny Flowers
- Larry Flowers
- Lee Flowers
- Marquis Flowers
- Richmond Flowers
- Tre Flowers
- Trey Flowers
- Zay Flowers
- Anthony Floyd
- Bobby Jack Floyd
- Chris Floyd
- Don Floyd
- Eric Floyd
- George Floyd
- John Floyd
- Leonard Floyd
- Malcolm Floyd
- Malcom Floyd
- Marcus Floyd
- Michael Floyd
- Owen Floyd
- Sharrif Floyd
- Victor Floyd
- William Floyd
- Andre Fluellen
- David Fluellen
- D. J. Fluker
- Darren Flutie
- Doug Flutie
- Don Flynn
- Furlong Flynn
- Matt Flynn
- Mike Flynn
- Tom Flynn
- Mark Flythe

== Fo ==
- Fred Foggie
- DeShawn Fogle
- Moise Fokou
- Spencer Folau
- Hank Foldberg
- Nick Foles
- Dave Foley
- Glenn Foley
- Jim Foley
- Steve Foley (born 1953)
- Steve Foley (born 1975)
- Tim Foley (born 1948)
- Tim Foley (born 1958)
- Dick Folk
- Nick Folk
- Brian Folkerts
- Lee Folkins
- Beryl Follet
- Zack Follett
- Brendan Folmar
- J. D. Folsom
- Steve Folsom
- James Folston
- Vern Foltz
- Art Folz
- Toniu Fonoti
- Albert Fontenot
- Chris Fontenot
- Herman Fontenot
- Jerry Fontenot
- Therrian Fontenot
- Wayne Fontes
- Chris Foote
- Larry Foote
- Dan Footman
- Kai Forbath
- Drew Forbes
- Emmanuel Forbes
- Marlon Forbes
- Adrian Ford
- Bernard Ford
- Brad Ford
- Carl Ford
- Charlie Ford
- Chase Ford
- Chris Ford
- Cody Ford
- Cole Ford
- Darryl Ford
- Dee Ford
- Fred Ford
- Garrett Ford, Sr.
- Henry Ford
- Henry Ford
- Isaiah Ford
- Jacob Ford
- Jacoby Ford
- James Ford
- Jaylan Ford
- Jerome Ford
- John Ford
- Jonathan Ford
- Keith Ford
- Len Ford
- Michael Ford
- Mike Ford
- Moses Ford
- Poona Ford
- Rudy Ford
- Salem Ford
- Trevor Ford
- Bryce Ford-Wheaton
- Brian Forde
- Jim Fordham
- Todd Fordham
- Chuck Foreman
- D'Onta Foreman
- Jay Foreman
- Bill Forester
- Herschel Forester
- Nick Forkovitch
- Kynan Forney
- Phil Forney
- Darrick Forrest
- Eddie Forrest
- Josh Forrest
- Tom Forrest
- Miller Forristall
- Fred Forsberg
- Justin Forsett
- Brock Forsey
- Dutch Forst
- Marcus Forston
- Alex Forsyth
- Ben Forsyth
- Stone Forsythe
- L. J. Fort
- Aldo Forte
- Bob Forte
- Ike Forte
- Matt Forte
- Roman Fortin
- Dan Fortmann
- Luke Fortner
- Jody Fortson
- Khairi Fortt
- Joe Fortunato
- Elliott Fortune
- Hosea Fortune
- William Fortune
- John Foruria
- J. P. Foschi
- Bob Fosdick
- Isaiah Foskey
- Arian Foster
- Barry Foster
- Bob Foster
- Derrick Foster
- D. J. Foster
- DeShaun Foster
- Eddie Foster
- Eric Foster
- Fred Foster
- Gene Foster
- George Foster
- Glenn Foster
- Javon Foster
- Jerome Foster
- Larry Foster
- Mason Foster
- Ralph Foster
- Ramon Foster
- Renardo Foster
- Reuben Foster
- Robert Foster
- Ron Foster
- Roy Foster
- Wally Foster
- Will Foster
- Cole Fotheringham
- Leki Fotu
- David Foucault
- Elbert Foules
- Daurice Fountain
- Jamal Fountaine
- John Fourcade
- Keith Fourcade
- Sid Fournet
- Leonard Fournette
- Dan Fouts
- Amos Fowler
- Aubrey Fowler
- Bennie Fowler
- Bobby Fowler (born 1940)
- Bobby Fowler (born 1960)
- Charlie Fowler
- Dan Fowler
- Dante Fowler
- Eric Fowler
- Jalston Fowler
- Jerry Fowler
- Melvin Fowler
- Ryan Fowler
- Todd Fowler
- Wayne Fowler
- Willmer Fowler
- Dennis Fowlkes
- Chas Fox
- Dan Fox
- Dustin Fox
- Jack Fox
- Jason Fox
- Keyaron Fox
- Mike Fox
- Morgan Fox
- Sam Fox
- Scott Fox
- Terry Fox
- Tim Fox
- Tomon Fox
- Vernon Fox
- Domonique Foxworth
- Dion Foxx

== Fra–Fre ==
- Mitchell Fraboni
- Reid Fragel
- Dick Frahm
- Todd Frain
- Hank Fraley
- Bill Fralic
- Eric Frampton
- Doug France
- Todd France
- Pete Franceschi
- Jason Franci
- Chris Francies
- Coye Francies
- A. J. Francis
- Carlos Francis
- Dave Francis
- Gene Francis
- Jacobi Francis
- James Francis
- Jeff Francis
- Joe Francis
- Jon Francis
- Justin Francis
- Phil Francis
- Ron Francis
- Russ Francis
- Sam Francis
- Wallace Francis
- Aaron Francisco
- George Franck
- Tom Franckhauser
- Mike Franckowiak
- Brian Franco
- Ed Franco
- Robert Francois
- Bill Frank
- Donald Frank
- Joe Frank
- John Frank
- Malcolm Frank
- Paul Frank
- Ike Frankian
- Andra Franklin
- Arnold Franklin
- Aubrayo Franklin
- Bobby Franklin
- Brad Franklin
- Byron Franklin
- Cleveland Franklin
- Collin Franklin
- Dennis Franklin
- George Franklin
- Jerrell Franklin
- Jerry Franklin
- Jethro Franklin
- John Franklin
- Johnathan Franklin
- Keith Franklin
- Larry Franklin
- Orlando Franklin
- P.J. Franklin
- Pat Franklin
- Paul Franklin
- Red Franklin
- Sam Franklin Jr.
- Stephen Franklin
- Tony Franklin
- Troy Franklin
- William Franklin
- Willie Franklin
- Zaire Franklin
- John Franklin-Myers
- Ray Frankowski
- Andrew Franks
- Bubba Franks
- Dennis Franks
- Dominique Franks
- Elvis Franks
- Feleipe Franks
- Jordan Franks
- Herb Franta
- John Frantz
- Nolan Franz
- Todd Franz
- Tracy Franz
- Paul Frase
- Jim Fraser
- Simon Fraser
- Al Frazier
- Andre Frazier
- Charley Frazier
- Cliff Frazier
- Curt Frazier
- Derrick Frazier
- Frank Frazier
- Guy Frazier
- Kavon Frazier
- Lance Frazier
- Leslie Frazier
- Miles Frazier
- Mose Frazier
- Paul Frazier
- Randy Frazier
- Wayne Frazier
- Willie Frazier
- Zach Frazier
- Andy Frederick
- Mike Frederick
- Terrence Frederick
- Travis Frederick
- Tucker Frederickson
- Rob Fredrickson
- Doug Free
- Blake Freeland
- Solomon Freelon
- Antonio Freeman
- Arturo Freeman
- Bobby Freeman
- Dalton Freeman
- Devonta Freeman
- Eddie Freeman
- Jack Freeman
- Jerrell Freeman
- Josh Freeman
- Lorenzo Freeman
- Mike Freeman (born 1944)
- Mike Freeman (born 1961)
- Phil Freeman
- Reggie Freeman
- Royce Freeman
- Russell Freeman
- Steve Freeman
- Dwight Freeney
- Jonathan Freeny
- Nate Freese
- Pat Freiermuth
- Jesse Freitas (born 1921)
- Jesse Freitas (born 1951)
- Makoa Freitas
- Rocky Freitas
- Barry French
- Ernest French
- Walter French
- Wesley French
- Gus Frerotte
- Mitch Frerotte
- Nolan Frese
- Dick Frey
- Glenn Frey
- Isaiah Frey

== Fri–Fu ==
- Ray Frick
- Ben Fricke
- Walt Frickey
- Larry Friday
- Mike Friede
- Bob Friedlund
- Benny Friedman
- Bob Friedman
- Jake Friedman
- Lennie Friedman
- Ben Friend
- Mike Frier
- Sherwood Fries
- Will Fries
- John Friesz
- Byron Frisch
- David Frisch
- Ernie Fritsch
- Louie Fritsch
- Ted Fritsch
- Ted Fritsch, Jr.
- Toni Fritsch
- George Fritts
- Stan Fritts
- Ralph Fritz
- Jim Fritzsche
- William Frizzell
- Len Frketich
- Bill Frohbose
- Hjalte Froholdt
- Jake Fromm
- Andy Fronczek
- John Frongillo
- Derrick Frost
- Ken Frost
- Scott Frost
- Isaac Fruechte
- Jim Frugone
- Babe Frump
- Ed Frutig
- Bob Fry
- Dustin Fry
- Elliott Fry
- Harry Fry
- Wesley Fry
- Irving Fryar
- Josh Fryar
- Brandon Frye
- Charlie Frye
- David Frye
- Phil Frye
- Brian Fryer
- Kenny Fryer
- Alani Fua
- Sione Fua
- Taliese Fuaga
- Chris Fuamatu-Maʻafala
- Dom Fucci
- Jamaal Fudge
- Jean Fugett
- Dick Fugler
- Scott Fujita
- Bill Fulcher
- David Fulcher
- Mondriel Fulcher
- Travis Fulgham
- Scott Fulhage
- Aaron Fuller
- Charley Fuller
- Corey Fuller (born 1971)
- Corey Fuller (born 1990)
- Curtis Fuller
- Eddie Fuller
- Frank Fuller
- James Fuller
- Jeff Fuller
- Joe Fuller
- Johnny Fuller
- Jordan Fuller
- Kendall Fuller
- Kyle Fuller (born 1992)
- Kyle Fuller (born 1994)
- Larry Fuller
- Mike Fuller
- Randy Fuller
- Steve Fuller
- Vincent Fuller
- Will Fuller
- William Fuller
- Ed Fullerton
- Darrell Fullington
- John Fullington
- Brent Fullwood
- Danny Fulton
- Ed Fulton
- Ken Fulton
- Kristian Fulton
- Ted Fulton
- Zach Fulton
- Mike Fultz
- Troy Fumagalli
- Devin Funchess
- Tom Funchess
- Tyrek Funderburk
- Jake Funk
- John Fuqua
- Ray Fuqua
- Jim Furey
- Tony Furjanic
- Steve Furness
- Will Furrer
- Mike Furrey
- Tony Furst
- Brandon Fusco
- Chuck Fusina
- Thomas Fussell
- Bobby Futrell
