= Curt Sandig =

American football player (1918–2006)

No. 11, 85
- Position: Halfback

Personal information
- Born: July 12, 1918; Mart, Texas, U.S.
- Died: February 13, 2006 (aged 87); San Antonio, Texas, U.S.
- Listed height: 5 ft 10 in (1.78 m)
- Listed weight: 170 lb (77 kg)

Career information
- High school: Mart
- College: Baylor (1938); St. Mary's (TX) (1939-1941)
- NFL draft: 1942: 5th round, 31st overall pick

Career history
- Pittsburgh Steelers (1942); Buffalo Bisons (1946)

Career NFL/AAFC statistics
- Rushing yards: 168
- Rushing average: 2.3
- Receptions: 8
- Receiving yards: 118
- Total touchdowns: 5
- Stats at Pro Football Reference

Curtis Walter Sandig (July 12, 1918 – February 13, 2006) was an American professional football halfback.

Sandig was born in Mart, Texas, in 1918 and attended Mart High School in that city. He played college football for Baylor and St. Mary's (TX). He played 49 consecutive games in four years with St. Mary's, ending in December 1941.

Sandig was selected by the Pittsburgh Steelers in the fifth round (31st overall pick) of the 1942 NFL draft. He played for the Steelers in 1942, appearing in 11 games, eight of them as a starter. He tallied 116 rushing yards, 103 receiving yards, 373 punt and kick return yards, four touchdowns, and five interceptions for the 1943 Steelers.

Sandig served in the Navy during World War II, missing the 1943, 1944, and 1945 seasons.

After the war, he played in the All-America Football Conference for the Buffalo Bisons in 1946. He appeared in nine games, one as a starter, for Buffalo.

Sandig died in 2006 at San Antonio.
