= Loyd Lowe =

American football player (1928-2019)

No. 28
- Position: Defensive back

Personal information
- Born: December 18, 1928; Prairie Hill, Texas
- Died: September 28, 2019 (aged 90)
- Listed height: 5 ft 10 in (1.78 m)
- Listed weight: 155 lb (70 kg)

Career information
- High school: Mart (TX)
- College: North Texas

Career history
- Chicago Bears (1953–1954)
- Stats at Pro Football Reference

Loyd Alvie Lowe (August 10, 1928 - September 28, 2019) was an American football defensive back who played for the Chicago Bears. He played college football at University of North Texas after attending Mart High School in Mart, Texas. He is a member of the North Texas Mean Green Hall of Fame.
