= Earl Bennett (disambiguation) =

Earl Bennett (born 1987) is an American former football player who was a wide receiver.

Earl Bennett may also refer to:

- Earl Fred Bennett (1919–2007), American comic actor and musician best known for his work with Spike Jones
- Earl "Jug" Bennett (1920–1992), American football guard
