= Jerry Hopkins (American football) =

American football player (1941–2026)

Profile
- Position: Linebacker

Personal information
- Born: January 24, 1941; Chalk Bluff, Texas, U.S.
- Died: July 27, 2026 (aged 85)

Career information
- High school: Mart (Mart, Texas)
- College: Texas A&M
- AFL draft: 1963: 4th round, 31st overall pick

Career history
- Houston Oilers (1963)*; Denver Broncos (1963–1966); Miami Dolphins (1967); Oakland Raiders (1968)
- * Offseason or practice squad member only

Awards and highlights
- First-team All-SWC (1962)
- Stats at Pro Football Reference

Jerry Wayne Hopkins (January 24, 1941 – July 27, 2026) was an American professional football player who was a linebacker for six seasons in the American Football League (AFL) with the Denver Broncos, Miami Dolphins, and Oakland Raiders. He played college football for the Texas A&M Aggies.

== Early life and education ==
Hopkins was born on January 24, 1941, in Chalk Bluff, Texas, a small town located near Waco, Texas, to Roy and Vada Ethel (Garrett) Hopkins. He was raised in Mart, Texas, where his parents farmed and operated Hopkins Oil Company.

He attended Mart High School in Central Texas. As a 177 lb (80.3 kg) sophomore in 1956, he played center on Mart's football team on offense, and was a key to the team's defense. The 1956 team won the district title and advanced to the Texas Class A playoffs. As a junior in 1957, the 190 lb (86.2 kg) Hopkins was an All-State guard, playing both offense and defense; and Mart tied for the state title.

Hopkins entered his senior year at 6 ft 1 in (1.85 m) 200 lb (90.7 kg). He played linebacker on defense and also played guard on the offensive line. Hopkins was also the team's placekicker. He was again an All-State guard as a senior in 1958. He was also reported to be a All-American. He was captain of his football team, and selected as a Super Centex Star three times. Hopkins played multiple sports while at Mart, earning fourteen athletic letters.

In 2003, he was inducted into the Texas High School Football Hall of Fame.

== College career ==
Hopkins attended Texas A&M University on a football scholarship. He graduated with a business administration degree. He played center on offense and linebacker on defense for the Aggies in the Southwest Conference (SWC). He was second-team at center on the 1959 All-SWC freshman team.

As a senior in 1962, he was a team co-captain; and his three interceptions on defense at linebacker led the team. In 1962, Hopkins was voted first-team All-SWC at center by the Associated Press's (AP) coaches poll. He also played linebacker on defense alongside future NFL linebacker Lee Roy Caffey. Hopkins was selected to play in the Blue Gray Game, was the South's starting center in the Southwest Challenge Bowl in January 1963, and also was named to the West team of college all stars for the April 1963 All-America Classic.

== Professional career ==
The Houston Oilers selected Hopkins in the fourth round of the 1963 AFL draft with the 31st overall pick. He was waived by the Oilers in early September without ever playing for the team. He signed with the Denver Broncos, and played in seven games for the Broncos in 1963 as a reserve linebacker and center. He had one interception.

His best season came in 1964. Hopkins started all 14 games. He was the Broncos’ starting middle linebacker, and then moved to starter at left linebacker to replace the injured Tom Erlandson. Hopkins had a career high, and team leading, eight quarterback sacks and two interceptions. His two interceptions came during the last game of the season against the Oilers. The game also included a brief altercation between Hopkins and Oilers kicker/quarterback George Blanda; who kicked Hopkins in the buttocks after Hopkins had knocked Blanda down on an extra point kick (though the two appeared to carry no grudges after the game). He played with a painful shoulder injury during the 1964 season. A team representative called Hopkins the Broncos best linebacker in 1964.

In 1965, Hopkins started nine games at middle linebacker for the Broncos, with one interception. In 1966, he started 13 games, playing all linebacking positions; with two interceptions and 1.5 sacks. In early November, Hopkins replaced Archie Matsos at middle linebacker. The Broncos had acquired Matsos in a trade before that season, and Matsos was so infuriated by the demotion to reserve that he left the team and was soon traded.

In June 1967, Hopkins was part of a seven player trade between the Broncos and Miami Dolphins that sent Hopkins, Abner Haynes, Dan LaRose and a high draft pick to Miami for Cookie Gilchrist, Ernie Park, Earl Faison and George Wilson Jr. (the son of Miami’s coach). During an exhibition game against the Broncos in July 1967, Hopkins returned an interception for a touchdown; but in the regular season he only started four games at linebacker for Miami in 1967.

The Dolphins released Hopkins in early September 1968. Within days, he signed with the Oakland Raiders. This made Hopkins and Blanda teammates on the 1968 Raiders. Hopkins played five regular season games as a reserve linebacker for the Raiders. He was waived in mid-November, but returned to the Raiders later that season. The Raiders won the final game of the season over the San Diego Chargers, 34–27, tying the Raiders with the Kansas City Chiefs at 12–2 for first place in the AFL West Division. Hopkins tackled Willie Post for a 17-yard loss in the Chargers-Raiders game. The first-place tie resulted in a playoff between the Raiders and Chiefs to determine the West Division champion. During the 1968 AFL West Division Playoffs against the Chiefs, Hopkins intercepted a Len Dawson pass, as part of the Raiders 41–6 victory. The Raiders lost to the New York Jets, 27–23, in the 1968 AFL Championship Game.

== Personal life and death ==
During his career, Hopkins owned a 100-acre cattle and alfalfa farm in Chalk Bluff. He was involved in the Fellowship of Christian Athletes.

Hopkins died on July 27, 2026, at the age of 85.
