= Ray Bucek =

American football player (1922–1965)

Felix Bucek
Profile
- Position: Guard/Linebacker

Personal information
- Born: January 31, 1922; Schulenburg, Texas, U.S.
- Died: August 13, 1965 (aged 43); Cape Girardeau, Missouri, U.S.
- Listed height: 6 ft 0 in (1.83 m)
- Listed weight: 186 lb (84 kg)

Career information
- High school: Schulenburg
- College: Texas A&M
- NFL draft: 1943: 19th round, 177th overall pick

Career history
- Pittsburgh Steelers (1946)

Awards and highlights
- National champion (1939); Sugar Bowl champion (1939); First-team All-SWC (1942)

Career NFL statistics
- Games played: 11
- Games started: 11
- Fumble recoveries: 1
- Stats at Pro Football Reference

Felix Alex "Ray" Bucek (January 31, 1922 – August 13, 1965) was an American professional football guard and linebacker who played one season with the Pittsburgh Steelers of the National Football League (NFL). He was selected by the "Steagles" in the 19th round of the 177th pick in the 1943 NFL draft. He played college football at Texas A&M University for the Texas A&M Aggies football team.
