= Edward Forrest =

Edward or Eddie Forrest may refer to:

- Edward Barrow Forrest (1838–1914), Australian company director and Queensland politician
- Eddie Forrest (American football) (1921–2001), played two seasons with the San Francisco 49ers
- Eddie Forrest (born 1978), Scottish footballer
