= John Finn (disambiguation) =

John Finn (born 1952) is an American actor.

John Finn may also refer to:

- John Finn (American football) (1895–1970), American football player and coach
- John William Finn (1909–2010), sailor and Pearl Harbor Medal of Honor recipient
- USS John Finn, a 2015 Arleigh Burke-class destroyer named for John William Finn
- John Finn (politician), Canadian politician
- Jon Finn (born 1958), American rock musician and guitarist
