= Feichtinger =

Feichtinger is a surname. Notable people with this surname include:

- Andy Feichtinger (1897-1962), American football end
- Anton Feichtinger. politician of the late 16th century in Slovenia
- Dietmar Feichtinger (born 1961), Austrian architect
- Elisabeth Feichtinger (born 1987), Austrian politician
- Hans Georg Feichtinger (born 1951), Austrian mathematician
- Wilfried Feichtinger (1950–2021), Austrian gynecologist
