= Jerry Hopkins =

Jerry Hopkins may refer to:

- Jerry Hopkins (author) (1935–2018), American author and journalist
- Jerry Hopkins (American football) (1941–2026), American football player
