= Larry Fuller =

Larry Fuller may refer to:

- Larry Fuller (choreographer), American dancer and choreographer
- Larry Fuller (American football) (1923–2005), American football running back
- Larry Fuller (cartoonist), African-American underground comix writer, publisher and promoter
- Larry Fuller (pianist) (born 1965), American jazz pianist
