= Cullen Rogers =

American football player (1921–1997)

No. 25
- Position: Halfback

Personal information
- Born: May 29, 1921; Mart, Texas, U.S.
- Died: November 1, 1997 (aged 76); McLennan County, Texas, U.S.
- Listed height: 5 ft 10 in (1.78 m)
- Listed weight: 175 lb (79 kg)

Career information
- High school: Mart
- College: Texas A&M (1938–1942)
- NFL draft: 1943: 16th round, 145th overall pick

Career history
- Los Angeles Rams (1946)*; Pittsburgh Steelers (1946)
- * Offseason or practice squad member only

Awards and highlights
- National champion (1939); First-team All-SWC (1942)
- Stats at Pro Football Reference

Cullen James Rogers (May 29, 1921 – November 1, 1997) was an American professional football halfback who played one season with the Pittsburgh Steelers of the National Football League (NFL). He was selected by the Cleveland Rams in the 16th round of the 1943 NFL draft. He played college football and baseball at Texas A&M University.

== Early life ==
Cullen James Rogers was born on May 29, 1921, in Mart, Texas. He attended Mart High School in Mart.

== College career ==
Rogers was a member of the Texas A&M Aggies freshman team in 1938. He was a letterman in 1939. The 1939 Aggie were consensus national champions. He was listed as ineligible in 1940 and was a letterman again from 1941 to 1942. He was named first-team All-SWC by both the Associated Press and United Press his senior year in 1942. Rogers was also a three-year letterman in baseball from 1941 to 1943. He was a team captain in both sports as a senior. He was inducted into the school's athletics hall of fame in 1984.

== Professional career ==
Rogers was selected by the Cleveland Rams in the 16th round, with the 145th overall pick, of the 1943 NFL draft. He served in the United States Army during World War II. After the war, he signed with the Los Angeles Rams in 1946 but was released later.

Rogers signed with the Pittsburgh Steelers in 1946. He played in five games for the Steelers during the 1946 season, totaling six rushing attempts for negative eight yards, one incomplete pass, three fumbles, and one fumble recovery. He was released on October 23, 1946.

== Personal life ==
Rogers died on November 1, 1997, in McLennan County, Texas.
