= George Perpich (American football) =

American football player (1920–1993)

No. 40, 49
- Position: Offensive tackle

Personal information
- Born: June 22, 1920; Krivi Put, Croatia
- Died: May 26, 1993 (aged 72); Hibbing, Minnesota, U.S.
- Listed height: 6 ft 2 in (1.88 m)
- Listed weight: 223 lb (101 kg)

Career information
- High school: Hibbing
- College: Georgetown (1939-1942)
- NFL draft: 1943: 11th round, 100th overall pick

Career history
- Brooklyn Dodgers (1946); Baltimore Colts (1947)

Awards and highlights
- Second-team All-Eastern (1942)

Career AAFC statistics
- Games played: 27
- Games started: 10
- Return yards: 16
- Stats at Pro Football Reference

George (Yuri) Rudolph Perpich (Prpic) (June 22, 1920 – May 26, 1993) was an American football tackle in the All-America Football Conference (AAFC) for the Brooklyn Dodgers and Baltimore Colts. He played college football at Georgetown University and was drafted in the eleventh round of the 1943 NFL draft by the Washington Redskins.
