= Fred Naumetz =

American football player (1922–1998)

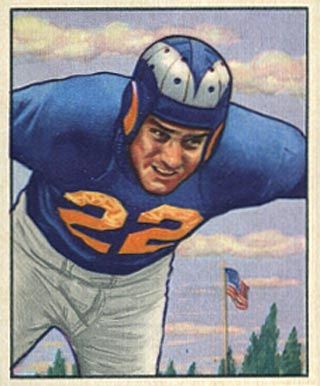
- Naumetz on a 1950 Bowman football card

No. 22
- Positions: Center, linebacker

Personal information
- Born: March 28, 1922; Newburyport, Massachusetts, U.S.
- Died: January 2, 1998 (aged 75); Thousand Oaks, California, U.S.
- Listed height: 6 ft 1 in (1.85 m)
- Listed weight: 222 lb (101 kg)

Career information
- High school: Newburyport
- College: Boston College
- NFL draft: 1943: 3rd round, 20th overall pick

Career history
- Los Angeles Rams (1946–1950)

Awards and highlights
- First-team All-Pro (1949); First-team All-American (1942); Second-team All-Eastern (1942)

Career NFL statistics
- Games played: 58
- Games started: 35
- Interceptions: 7
- Fumble recoveries: 2
- Stats at Pro Football Reference

Frederick Naumetz (March 28, 1922 – January 2, 1998) was an American professional football player who was a center and linebacker in the National Football League (NFL). He played five seasons for the Los Angeles Rams. Naumetz played college football for the Boston College Eagles and was selected 20th overall by the Cleveland Rams in the third round of the 1943 NFL draft.
