= Max Kielbasa =

American football player (1921–1980)

No. 73
- Position: Halfback

Personal information
- Born: August 23, 1921; Brownsville, Pennsylvania, U.S.
- Died: January 12, 1980 (aged 58); Pittsburgh, Pennsylvania, U.S.
- Listed height: 6 ft 1 in (1.85 m)
- Listed weight: 185 lb (84 kg)

Career information
- College: Duquesne
- NFL draft: 1943: 16th round, 147th overall pick

Career history
- Pittsburgh Steelers (1946–1947)

Awards and highlights
- Second-team All-Eastern (1942)
- Stats at Pro Football Reference

Maxmillan Kielbasa (August 23, 1921 – January 12, 1980) was an American professional football player for the National Football League (NFL)'s Pittsburgh Steelers in 1946. He was selected by the Philadelphia-Pittsburgh "Steagles" in the 16th round (147th overall) of the 1943 NFL draft. Prior to joining the Steelers, Max played college football at Duquesne University. He was inducted into the Duquesne University Sports Hall of Fame on November 27, 1979. After his playing career ended Max became the custodian for the apartment building, which he lived in, in Brentwood, Pennsylvania.
