= Gil Bouley =

American football player (1921–2006)

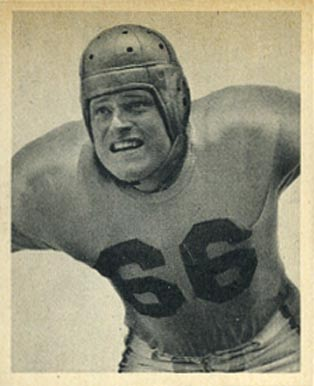
- Bouley on a 1948 Bowman football card

No. 42, 66
- Positions: Tackle, defensive tackle

Personal information
- Born: November 15, 1921; Plainfield, Connecticut, U.S.
- Died: February 8, 2006 (aged 84); Boston, Massachusetts, U.S.
- Listed height: 6 ft 2 in (1.88 m)
- Listed weight: 235 lb (107 kg)

Career information
- High school: Norwich (CT)
- College: Boston College (1940-1942)
- NFL draft: 1944: 3rd round, 26th overall pick

Career history

Playing
- Cleveland / Los Angeles Rams (1945–1950)

Coaching
- Toronto Argonauts (1956) Line coach

Awards and highlights
- NFL champion (1945); First-team All-American (1942); Second-team All-Eastern (1942)

Career NFL statistics
- Receptions: 3
- Receiving yards: 41
- Total touchdowns: 1
- Stats at Pro Football Reference

Gilbert J. Bouley (November 15, 1921 – February 8, 2006) was an American professional football player who was an offensive lineman for six seasons in the National Football League (NFL) with the Cleveland / Los Angeles Rams. He played college football for the Boston College Eagles. Bouley died in 2006.
