= Bill Baumgartner =

American football player (1921–1981)

- Baumgartner in 1947

No. 29, 54
- Position: End

Personal information
- Born: April 17, 1921; Duluth, Minnesota, U.S.
- Died: September 30, 1981 (age 60); Rapid City, South Dakota, U.S.
- Listed height: 6 ft 3 in (1.91 m)
- Listed weight: 202 lb (92 kg)

Career information
- High school: Denfeld (MN)
- College: Minnesota (1940-1942, 1946)
- NFL draft: 1943: 13th round, 113th overall pick

Career history
- Baltimore Colts (1947)

Awards and highlights
- 2× National champion (1940, 1941)

Career AAFC statistics
- Games: 2
- Stats at Pro Football Reference

William R. Baumgartner Sr. (April 17, 1921 – September 30, 1981) was an American professional football player who played at the end position. He played college football for Minnesota from 1940 to 1942 and professional football for the Baltimore Colts during the 1947 season.

== Biography ==
=== Early life ===
A native of Duluth, Minnesota, he Denfeld High School in Duluth. While in high school, he was a sprinter for the track team and also played basketball and football.

=== College football ===
He played college football for the Minnesota Golden Gophers. He was a member of the undefeated 1940 and 1941 Minnesota Golden Gophers football teams that won back-to-back national championships. His arms were so long that the school had to order special jerseys for him.

Here on defense, Baumgartner leaps a fallen Gopher teammate in an attempt to stop Wisconsin's Lisle Blackbourn, Nov. 1946.

He was invited to play in the 1943 Chicago College All-Star Game, but by that time he was serving in the military as a naval aviation cadet.

Baumgartner saw 23 months of service as a Navy Air Force pilot and played football for the Bunker Hill Naval Air Station football team in 1944, leading them to an undefeated season.

After the end of World War II, Baumgartner returned to school at the University of Minnesota, where he again played football and was named an All-American. He graduated in 1947 with a degree in business.

=== Professional football ===
Although still in the military at the time, Baumgartner was selected by the Chicago Cardinals in the 13th round (113th overall pick) of the 1943 NFL draft.

Upon his return to football, he would never play for the Cardinals, however, instead signing a contract in July 1947 with the Baltimore Colts of the rival All-America Football Conference (AAFC).

Baumgartner appeared in two games of the 1947 Colts season. He was waived by the Colts late in September 1947 to make room on the roster for All-American end Elmer Madar, who played collegiately for Michigan.

=== Life after football ===
Baumgartner worked as director of the Northwest Lumbermen's Association. He was also a member of the Rapid City Regional Hospital board of directors and served as chairman of the board during the facility's construction.

He also worked as a real estate developer, serving as president of the Pinedale Development Corporation and a director of the North Rapid Shopping Center.

At the time of his death, Baumgartner worked as chairman of the South Dakota Racing Commission.

=== Death and legacy ===
Bill Baumgartner died September 30, 1981, of an apparent heart attack in Rapid City, South Dakota. He was 60 years old at the time of his death.

He was survived by his wife Patricia and four children.
