= Mart Independent School District =

School district in Texas

Mart Independent School District is a public school district based in Mart, Texas, United States. Located in McLennan County, a portion of the district extends into Limestone and Falls Counties.

In 2009, the school district was rated "academically acceptable" by the Texas Education Agency.

== Schools ==
- Mart High School (grades 9-12)
- Mart Middle School (grades 5–8)
- Mart Elementary School (prekindergarten - grade 4)
