= 1943 NFL draft =

National Football League draft

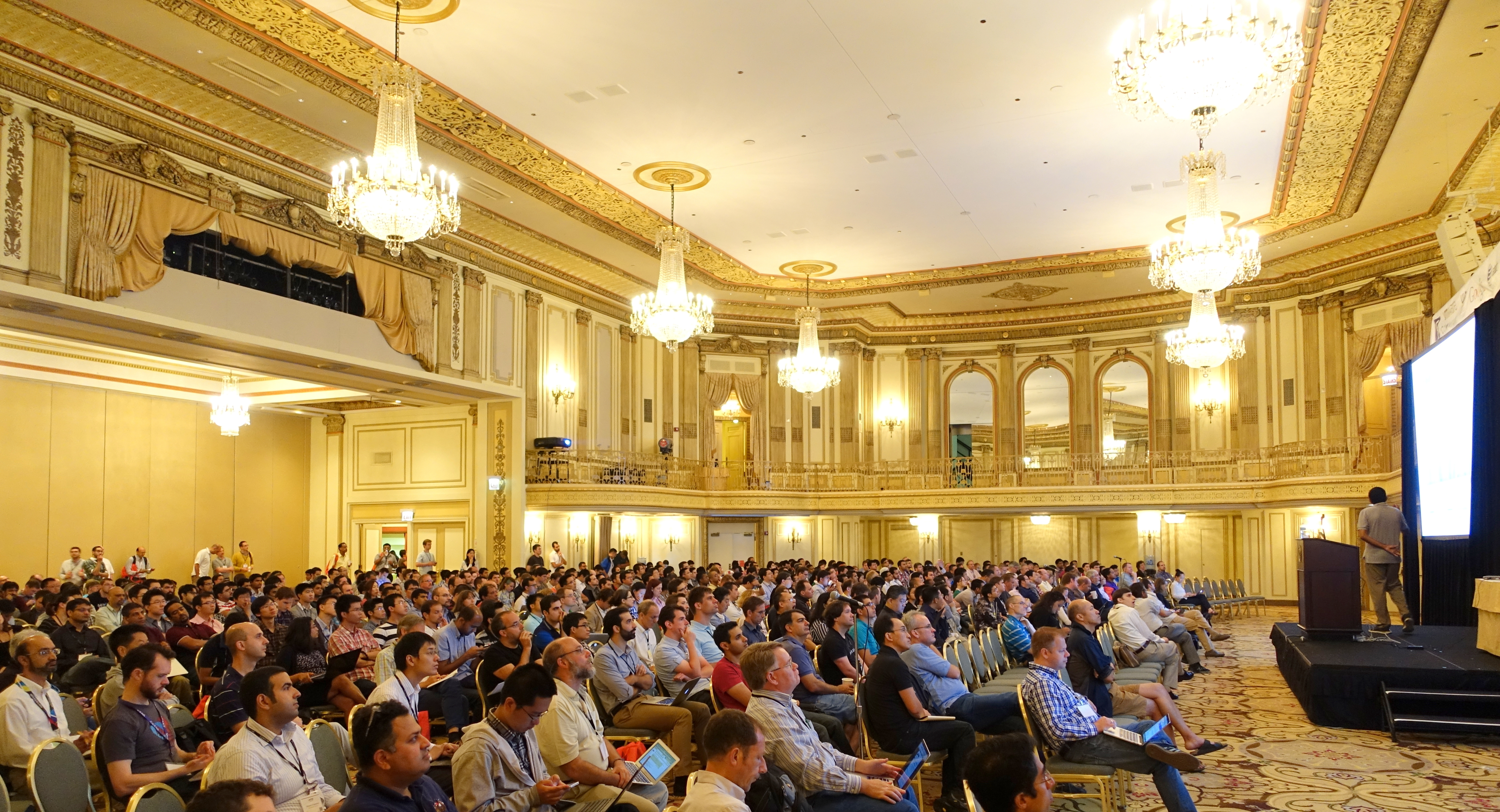
- Ballroom of The Palmer House Hotel (location of the draft), photographed in 2014

General information
- Date: April 8, 1943
- Location: Palmer House Hotel in Chicago, IL

Overview
- 300 total selections in 32 rounds
- League: NFL
- First selection: Frank Sinkwich, HB; Detroit Lions
- Hall of Famers: none

The 1943 NFL draft was held on April 8, 1943, at the Palmer House Hotel in Chicago, Illinois. With the first overall pick of the draft, the Detroit Lions selected halfback Frank Sinkwich. This draft is the first NFL draft not to produce a member of the Pro Football Hall of Fame.

Each of the league's ten teams selected a total of 30 players. As an equalizing measure the five worst finishing teams from the 1942 season allowed to pick alone in rounds 2 and 4 with the five top finishers relegated to sole participation in the 31st and 32nd rounds.

== Player selections ==
	= Hall of Famer
†	= Pro Bowler (Note: Players are identified as a Pro Bowler if they were selected for the Pro Bowl at any time in their career.)

=== Round 1 ===
Pick #	NFL team	Player	Position	College
1	Detroit Lions	Frank Sinkwich	Halfback	Georgia
2	Philadelphia Eagles	Joe Muha	Fullback	VMI
3	Chicago Cardinals	Glenn Dobbs	Tailback	Tulsa
4	Brooklyn Dodgers	Paul Governali	Quarterback	Columbia
5	Cleveland Rams	Mike Holovak	Fullback	Boston College
6	New York Giants	Steve Filipowicz	Fullback	Fordham
7	Pittsburgh Steelers	Bill Daley	Fullback	Minnesota
8	Green Bay Packers	Dick Wildung	Tackle	Minnesota
9	Chicago Bears	Bob Steuber	Halfback	Missouri
10	Washington Redskins	Jack Jenkins	Fullback	Vanderbilt

=== Round 2 ===
Pick #	NFL team	Player	Position	College
11	Detroit Lions	Dave Schreiner	End	Wisconsin
12	Philadelphia Eagles	Lamar "Racehorse" Davis	Back	Georgia
13	Brooklyn Dodgers	J.T. "Blondy" Black	Back	Mississippi State
14	Chicago Cardinals	John Grigas	Back	Holy Cross
15	Cleveland Rams	Tom Farmer	Back	Iowa

=== Round 3 ===
Pick #	NFL team	Player	Position	College
16	Detroit Lions	Dick Ashcom	Tackle	Oregon
17	Philadelphia Eagles	Roy "Monk" Gafford	Back	Auburn
18	Chicago Cardinals	Don Currivan	End	Boston College
19	Brooklyn Dodgers	George Ceithaml	Back	Michigan
20	Cleveland Rams	Fred Naumetz	Center	Boston College
21	New York Giants	Dewey Proctor	Back	Furman
22	Pittsburgh Steelers	Jack Russell	End	Baylor
23	Green Bay Packers	Irv Comp	Back	Benedictine
24	Chicago Bears	Fred "Dippy" Evans	Back	Notre Dame
25	Washington Redskins	Bill Dutton	Back	Pittsburgh

=== Round 4 ===
Pick #	NFL team	Player	Position	College
26	Detroit Lions	Ralph Hamer	Back	Furman
27	Philadelphia Eagles	Bob Kennedy	Back	Washington State
28	Brooklyn Dodgers	Joe Domnanovich	Center	Alabama
29	Chicago Cardinals	Al Hust	End	Tennessee
30	Cleveland Rams	Chuck Taylor	Guard	Stanford

=== Round 5 ===
Pick #	NFL team	Player	Position	College
31	Detroit Lions	Lloyd Wickett	Tackle	Oregon State
32	Philadelphia Eagles	Al "Ox" Wistert	Tackle	Michigan
33	Chicago Cardinals	George Hecht	Guard	Alabama
34	Brooklyn Dodgers	Marty Comer	End	Tulane
35	Cleveland Rams	Clyde Johnson	Tackle	Kentucky
36	New York Giants	Val Culwell	Guard	Oregon
37	Pittsburgh Steelers	Harry Connolly	Back	Boston College
38	Green Bay Packers	Roy McKay	Back	Texas
39	Chicago Bears	Ed Stamm	Tackle	Stanford
40	Washington Redskins	Bob Dove	End	Notre Dame

=== Round 6 ===
Pick #	NFL team	Player	Position	College
41	Detroit Lions	Jim Jones	Back	Union (TN)
42	Philadelphia Eagles	Bruno Banducci	Guard	Stanford
43	Brooklyn Dodgers	Harvey "Stud" Johnson	Back	William & Mary
44	Chicago Cardinals	Al Klug	Tackle	Marquette
45	Cleveland Rams	Les Horvath	Quarterback	Ohio State
46	New York Giants	Jim Reynolds	Back	Auburn
47	Pittsburgh Steelers	Lou Sossamon	Center	South Carolina
48	Green Bay Packers	Nick Susoeff	End	Washington State
49	Chicago Bears	Derrell Palmer	Tackle	TCU
50	Washington Redskins	Wally Ziemba	Center	Notre Dame

=== Round 7 ===
Pick #	NFL team	Player	Position	College
51	Detroit Lions	Paul Sizemore	End	Furman
52	Philadelphia Eagles	Walt Harrison	Center	Washington
53	Chicago Cardinals	Stan Mauldin	Tackle	Texas
54	Brooklyn Dodgers	John Matisi	Tackle	Duquesne
55	Cleveland Rams	Bill Henderson	End	Texas A&M
56	New York Giants	Lou Palazzi	Center	Penn State
57	Pittsburgh Steelers	Al Ratto	Center	St. Mary's (CA)
58	Green Bay Packers	Ken Snelling	Back	UCLA
59	Chicago Bears	Milt Vucinich	Center	Stanford
60	Washington Redskins	Lou Rymkus	Tackle	Notre Dame

=== Round 8 ===
Pick #	NFL team	Player	Position	College
61	Detroit Lions	George Poschner	End	Georgia
62	Philadelphia Eagles	Bruce Alford	End	TCU
63	Brooklyn Dodgers	John Ferguson	End	California
64	Chicago Cardinals	Bill Godwin	Center	Georgia
65	Cleveland Rams	Bill Parker	End	Iowa
66	New York Giants	Larry Visnic	Guard	Benedictine
67	Pittsburgh Steelers	Ray Curry	End	St. Mary's (CA)
68	Green Bay Packers	Lester Gatewood	Center	Baylor
69	Chicago Bears	Alyn Beals	End	Santa Clara
70	Washington Redskins	Tony Leon	Guard	Alabama

=== Round 9 ===
Pick #	NFL team	Player	Position	College
71	Detroit Lions	Jack Irish	Tackle	Arizona
72	Philadelphia Eagles	Rocco Canale	Guard	Boston College
73	Chicago Cardinals	Moffatt Storer	Back	Duke
74	Brooklyn Dodgers	Ray Rason	Guard	SMU
75	Cleveland Rams	Al Solari	Back	UCLA
76	New York Giants	Doyle Caraway	Guard	Texas Tech
77	Pittsburgh Steelers	Ed Murphy	End	Holy Cross
78	Green Bay Packers	Norm Verry	Tackle	USC
79	Chicago Bears	Jim Jurkovich	Back	California
80	Washington Redskins	Bob Motl	End	Northwestern

=== Round 10 ===
Pick #	NFL team	Player	Position	College
81	Detroit Lions	Jack Fenton	Back	Michigan State
82	Philadelphia Eagles	Bill Conoly	Tackle	Texas
83	Brooklyn Dodgers	Vic Schleich	Tackle	Nebraska
84	Chicago Cardinals	Fondren Mitchell	Back	Florida
85	Cleveland Rams	Homer Simmons	Tackle	Oklahoma
86	New York Giants	Bill Piccolo	Center	Canisius
87	Pittsburgh Steelers	Dick Dwelle	Back	Rice
88	Green Bay Packers	Solon "Bobo" Barnett	Guard	Baylor
89	Chicago Bears	Walt "Dub" Lamb	End	Oklahoma
90	Washington Redskins	Walt McDonald	Back	Tulane

=== Round 11 ===
Pick #	NFL team	Player	Position	College
91	Detroit Lions	Dick Renfro	Back	Washington State
92	Philadelphia Eagles	John Billman	Guard	Minnesota
93	Chicago Cardinals	Emil Lussow	End	Dubuque
94	Brooklyn Dodgers	Joe Sabasteanski	Center	Fordham
95	Cleveland Rams	Tom Roblin	Back	Oregon
96	New York Giants	Glenn Knox	End	William & Mary
97	Pittsburgh Steelers	Al Wukits	Center	Duquesne
98	Green Bay Packers	Bob Forte	Back	Arkansas
99	Chicago Bears	Ray "Duke" Hammett	Back	Stanford
100	Washington Redskins	George Perpich	Tackle	Georgetown

=== Round 12 ===
Pick #	NFL team	Player	Position	College
101	Detroit Lions	Bob Kolesar	Guard	Michigan
102	Philadelphia Eagles	Jack Donaldson	Tackle	Penn
103	Brooklyn Dodgers	Lou Thomas	Back	Tulane
104	Chicago Cardinals	Paul Hirsbrunner	Tackle	Wisconsin
105	Cleveland Rams	Bill Vickroy	Center	Ohio State
106	New York Giants	Walt Domina	Back	Norwich
107	Pittsburgh Steelers	Joe Repko	Tackle	Boston College
108	Green Bay Packers	Van Davis	End	Georgia
109	Chicago Bears	Al Zikmund	Back	Nebraska
110	Washington Redskins	Dan Wood	Center	Ole Miss

=== Round 13 ===
Pick #	NFL team	Player	Position	College
111	Detroit Lions	Del Huntsinger	Back	Portland
112	Philadelphia Eagles	Bill Erickson	Center	Georgetown
113	Chicago Cardinals	Bill Baumgartner	End	Minnesota
114	Brooklyn Dodgers	Bert Stiff	Back	Penn
115	Cleveland Rams	Tom Alberghini	Guard	Holy Cross
116	New York Giants	Don McCafferty	Tackle	Ohio State
117	Pittsburgh Steelers	Pete Boltrek	Tackle	NC State
118	Green Bay Packers	Tom Brock	Center	Notre Dame
119	Chicago Bears	Clark Wood	Tackle	Kentucky
120	Washington Redskins	Harry Wright	Guard	Notre Dame

=== Round 14 ===
Pick #	NFL team	Player	Position	College
121	Detroit Lions	Ellard Dernoncourt	End	St. Louis
122	Philadelphia Eagles	George Weeks	End	Alabama
123	Brooklyn Dodgers	John Fekete	Back	Ohio
124	Chicago Cardinals	Garrard "Buster" Ramsey	Guard	William & Mary
125	Cleveland Rams	Sam Sharp	End	Alabama
126	New York Giants	Jay Stoves	Back	Washington State
127	Pittsburgh Steelers	Mort Shiekman	Guard	Penn
128	Green Bay Packers	Ralph Tate	Back	Oklahoma A&M
129	Chicago Bears	Loyd Arms	Tackle	Oklahoma A&M
130	Washington Redskins	Oscar Britt	Guard	Ole Miss

=== Round 15 ===
Pick #	NFL team	Player	Position	College
131	Detroit Lions	Dick Woodward	End	Colorado
132	Philadelphia Eagles	Russ Craft	Back	Alabama
133	Chicago Cardinals	Earl Doloway	Back	Indiana
134	Brooklyn Dodgers	Floyd Rhea	Guard	Oregon
135	Cleveland Rams	Dick Kieppe	Back	Michigan State
136	New York Giants	Howard Currie	Tackle	Geneva
137	Pittsburgh Steelers	Milt Crain	Back	Baylor
138	Green Bay Packers	Don Carlson	Tackle	Denver
139	Chicago Bears	Lyle Sturdy	Back	Wichita
140	Washington Redskins	Dick Weber	Guard	Syracuse

=== Round 16 ===
Pick #	NFL team	Player	Position	College
141	Detroit Lions	Marvin Bass	Tackle	William & Mary
142	Philadelphia Eagles	Paul Darling	Back	Iowa State
143	Brooklyn Dodgers	Bill Burkett	End	Iowa
144	Chicago Cardinals	Nick Burke	Guard	Northwestern
145	Cleveland Rams	Cullen Rogers	Back	Texas A&M
146	New York Giants	N. A. Keithley	Back	Tulsa
147	Pittsburgh Steelers	Max Kielbasa	Back	Duquesne
148	Green Bay Packers	Mike Welch	Back	Minnesota
149	Chicago Bears	Buddy Tomlinson	Tackle	Hardin–Simmons
150	Washington Redskins	Joe Day	Back	Oregon State

=== Round 17 ===
Pick #	NFL team	Player	Position	College
151	Detroit Lions	Vic Peelish	Guard	West Virginia
152	Philadelphia Eagles	Walt Gorinski	Back	LSU
153	Chicago Cardinals	Bill Campbell	Back	Oklahoma
154	Brooklyn Dodgers	Al Onofrio	Back	Arizona State
155	Cleveland Rams	Walt Ruark	Guard	Georgia
156	New York Giants	Jack Lister	End	Missouri
157	Pittsburgh Steelers	Nick Skorich	Guard	Cincinnati
158	Green Bay Packers	Ron Thomas	Guard	USC
159	Chicago Bears	Pat Preston	Tackle	Wake Forest
160	Washington Redskins	Frank Dornfield	Back	Georgetown

=== Round 18 ===
Pick #	NFL team	Player	Position	College
161	Detroit Lions	Chet Maeda	Back	Colorado A&M
162	Philadelphia Eagles	Bob Friedman	Tackle	Washington
163	Brooklyn Dodgers	Ken Schoonover	Tackle	Penn State
164	Chicago Cardinals	Clarence Booth	Tackle	SMU
165	Cleveland Rams	Bert Davis	Center	Utah
166	New York Giants	Dwight Holshouser	Back	Catawba
167	Pittsburgh Steelers	Jackie Field	Back	Texas
168	Green Bay Packers	Jim Powers	Tackle	St. Mary's (CA)
169	Chicago Bears	Hank Norberg	End	Stanford
170	Washington Redskins	John Baklarz	Tackle	Arizona State

=== Round 19 ===
Pick #	NFL team	Player	Position	College
171	Detroit Lions	Bert Kuczynski	End	Penn
172	Philadelphia Eagles	Johnny Bezemes	Back	Holy Cross
173	Chicago Cardinals	Elvis "Boots" Simmons	End	Texas A&M
174	Brooklyn Dodgers	Quentin Barnette	Back	West Virginia
175	Cleveland Rams	Jay Fidler	Tackle	Brown
176	New York Giants	Jim Lushine	Tackle	Minnesota
177	Pittsburgh Steelers	Felix Bucek	Guard	Texas A&M
178	Green Bay Packers	Hal Prescott	End	Hardin–Simmons
179	Chicago Bears	Pat Lyons	End	Wisconsin
180	Washington Redskins	Leo Mogus	End	Youngstown State

=== Round 20 ===
Pick #	NFL team	Player	Position	College
181	Detroit Lions	Al Scanland	Back	Oklahoma A&M
182	Philadelphia Eagles	Chet Mutryn	Back	Xavier
183	Brooklyn Dodgers	Bill Bledsoe	End	USC
184	Chicago Cardinals	Roy Ericson	Guard	Villanova
185	Cleveland Rams	Carl Falk	Tackle	Washington
186	New York Giants	Veto Berllus	End	Idaho
187	Pittsburgh Steelers	Johnny Welsh	Back	Penn
188	Green Bay Packers	Eddie Forrest	Center	Santa Clara
189	Chicago Bears	Marion Butler	Back	Clemson
190	Washington Redskins	Dick Secrest	Back	Rochester

=== Round 21 ===
Pick #	NFL team	Player	Position	College
191	Detroit Lions	Royal "Ace" Lohry	Back	Iowa State
192	Philadelphia Eagles	Baptiste Manzini	Center	St. Vincent
193	Chicago Cardinals	George "Locomotive" Smith	Back	Villanova
194	Brooklyn Dodgers	Bob Coutchie	End	Arizona
195	Cleveland Rams	Tom Coll	End	St. Mary's (CA)
196	New York Giants	Fred Marshall	Guard	North Carolina
197	Pittsburgh Steelers	Tony Compagno	Back	St. Mary's (CA)
198	Green Bay Packers	Lloyd Wasserbach	Tackle	Wisconsin
199	Chicago Bears	Al Santucci	Center	Santa Clara
200	Washington Redskins	Don Nolander	Center	Minnesota

=== Round 22 ===
Pick #	NFL team	Player	Position	College
201	Detroit Lions	Percy Holland	Guard	LSU
202	Philadelphia Eagles	Bernie Gillespie	End	Scranton
203	Brooklyn Dodgers	Don "Bull" Reece	Back	Missouri
204	Chicago Cardinals	George Sutch	Back	Temple
205	Cleveland Rams	Mark McCorkle	Back	Washington
206	New York Giants	John Korczowski	Back	William & Mary
207	Pittsburgh Steelers	Willie Zapalac	Back	Texas A&M
208	Green Bay Packers	Mark Hoskins	Back	Wisconsin
209	Chicago Bears	Orville Johnson	Guard	SMU
210	Washington Redskins	Johnny Barrett	Back	Georgetown

=== Round 23 ===
Pick #	NFL team	Player	Position	College
211	Detroit Lions	Mike Fitzgerald	Guard	Missouri
212	Philadelphia Eagles	Jay "Mule" Lawhon	Tackle	Arkansas
213	Chicago Cardinals	Cliff Kimsey	Back	Georgia
214	Brooklyn Dodgers	W.J. Gibson	End	NC State
215	Cleveland Rams	Ed Moshofsky	Tackle	Oregon
216	New York Giants	Gene Hoeman	End	Oklahoma A&M
217	Pittsburgh Steelers	George Bain	Tackle	Oregon State
218	Green Bay Packers	Earl "Jug" Bennett	Guard	Hardin–Simmons
219	Chicago Bears	Wally Boudreau	Back	Boston College
220	Washington Redskins	Tom Vohs	Tackle	Colgate

=== Round 24 ===
Pick #	NFL team	Player	Position	College
221	Detroit Lions	Will Remington	Center	Washington State
222	Philadelphia Eagles	Vince Zachem	Center	Morehead State
223	Brooklyn Dodgers	Lou "Dude" Dent	Back	Colorado A&M
224	Chicago Cardinals	Weldon Humble	Guard	Rice
225	Cleveland Rams	Hal Adams	Back	Missouri
226	New York Giants	Keith Beebe	Back	Occidental
227	Pittsburgh Steelers	Harry Wynne	Tackle	Arkansas
228	Green Bay Packers	George Zellick	End	Oregon State
229	Chicago Bears	Bob Baumann	Tackle	Wisconsin
230	Washington Redskins	Charlie Yancey	Back	Mississippi State

=== Round 25 ===
Pick #	NFL team	Player	Position	College
231	Detroit Lions	Huel Hamm	Back	Oklahoma
232	Philadelphia Eagles	Joe Schwarting	End	Texas
233	Chicago Cardinals	Cal Purdin	Back	Tulsa
234	Brooklyn Dodgers	Gene Lee	Center	Florida
235	Cleveland Rams	Jim Shephard	End	Oregon
236	New York Giants	Dave Brown	Back	Alabama
237	Pittsburgh Steelers	Joe Cibulas	Tackle	Duquesne
238	Green Bay Packers	Gene Bierhaus	End	Minnesota
239	Chicago Bears	Elwood Holtscher	Center	Shurtleff
240	Washington Redskins	Roman Bentz	Tackle	Tulane

=== Round 26 ===
Pick #	NFL team	Player	Position	College
241	Detroit Lions	Irv Konopka	Tackle	Idaho
242	Philadelphia Eagles	Bob Neff	Tackle	Notre Dame
243	Brooklyn Dodgers	Harvey Hardy	Guard	Georgia Tech
244	Chicago Cardinals	Eddie McGovern	Back	Illinois
245	Cleveland Rams	Jack Stetler	Back	Pittsburgh
246	New York Giants	Maurice Hail	Guard	Tulsa
247	Pittsburgh Steelers	Bill Yambrick	Center	Western Michigan
248	Green Bay Packers	George Makris	Guard	Wisconsin
249	Chicago Bears	Ben Keller	Guard	Duquesne
250	Washington Redskins	Paul "Swifty" Berthold	End	Syracuse

=== Round 27 ===
Pick #	NFL team	Player	Position	College
251	Detroit Lions	Chuck Fears	Tackle	UCLA
252	Philadelphia Eagles	Art Macioszczyk	Back	Western Michigan
253	Chicago Cardinals	Al Drulis	Guard	Temple
254	Brooklyn Dodgers	Bob Green	Tackle	Arkansas
255	Cleveland Rams	Jeff Davis	Center	Missouri
256	New York Giants	Ed McNamara	Tackle	Holy Cross
257	Pittsburgh Steelers	Jack Freeman	Guard	Texas
258	Green Bay Packers	Pete Susick	Back	Washington
259	Chicago Bears	Charley Block	End	Shurtleff
260	Washington Redskins	Vince Pacewic	Back	Loyola (CA)

=== Round 28 ===
Pick #	NFL team	Player	Position	College
261	Detroit Lions	Bert Ekern	End	Missouri
262	Philadelphia Eagles	Jim Arata	Tackle	Xavier
263	Brooklyn Dodgers	Steve Poleshuk	Guard	Colgate
264	Chicago Cardinals	Ken MacDonald	Center	Rutgers
265	Cleveland Rams	Steve Pritko	End	Villanova
266	New York Giants	Dick Drake	Tackle	Ohio Wesleyan
267	Pittsburgh Steelers	Joe Goode	Back	Duquesne
268	Green Bay Packers	Bud Hasse	End	Northwestern
269	Chicago Bears	Ted Brannon	Tackle	Rice
270	Washington Redskins	Joe Riccardi	Tackle	Ohio

=== Round 29 ===
Pick #	NFL team	Player	Position	College
271	Detroit Lions	Virgil Wagner	Back	Millikin
272	Philadelphia Eagles	Wally Scott	End	Texas
273	Chicago Cardinals	Bill Edwards	Guard	LSU
274	Brooklyn Dodgers	Al Sabo	Back	Alabama
275	Cleveland Rams	Floyd Konetsky	Guard	Florida
276	New York Giants	Stan Ritinski	End	Fordham
277	Pittsburgh Steelers	Jack Durishan	Tackle	Pittsburgh
278	Green Bay Packers	Dick Thornally	Tackle	Wisconsin
279	Chicago Bears	Lou Wayne	End	Texas
280	Washington Redskins	Johnny Jaffurs	Guard	Penn State

=== Round 30 ===
Pick #	NFL team	Player	Position	College
281	Detroit Lions	Manny Kaplan	Back	Western Maryland
282	Philadelphia Eagles	Stan Jaworowski	Tackle	Georgetown
283	Brooklyn Dodgers	George Allshouse	Center	Pittsburgh
284	Chicago Cardinals	Pete Hecomovich	Back	Idaho
285	Cleveland Rams	Willie Miller	Guard	LSU
286	New York Giants	Clark Mollenhoff	Tackle	Drake
287	Pittsburgh Steelers	Fritz Lobpries	Guard	Texas
288	Green Bay Packers	Bob Ray	Back	Wisconsin
289	Chicago Bears	Dick Creevy	Back	Notre Dame
290	Washington Redskins	Frank Akins	Back	Washington State

=== Round 31 ===
Pick #	NFL team	Player	Position	College
291	New York Giants	Verlin Adams	Guard	Morris Harvey
292	Pittsburgh Steelers	Art Jones	Back	Haverford
293	Green Bay Packers	Brunel Christensen	Tackle	California
294	Chicago Bears	Bill Buffington	Back	Purdue
295	Washington Redskins	Bill "Mother" Corry	Back	Florida

=== Round 32 ===
Rnd.	Pick	Team	Player	Pos.	College	Notes
32	296	New York Giants	Bob Brundage	B	Penn	
32	297	Pittsburgh Steelers	Bob Ruman	B	Arizona	
32	298	Green Bay Packers	Ken Roskie	B	USC	
32	299	Chicago Bears	Woody Peterson	B	Utah	
32	300	Washington Redskins	Bo Bogovich	G	Delaware	

== Hall of Famers ==
None of the players selected in the 1943 NFL draft have been inducted into the Pro Football Hall of Fame.

== Notable undrafted players ==
^{†}	= Pro Bowl

Original NFL team	Player	Pos.	College	Notes
Green Bay Packers	Don Perkins	HB	UW–Platteville	
New York Giants	Bill Paschal ^{†}	HB	Georgia Tech	
Philadelphia Eagles	Allie Sherman	QB/CB	Brooklyn	
Philadelphia Eagles	Bucko Kilroy ^{†}	G/DT	Temple	
Philadelphia Eagles	Tom Miller	E/DE	Hampden–Sydney	
Pittsburgh Steelers	Bob Thurbon	HB	Pittsburgh	
