= Stan Mauldin =

American football player (1920–1948)

No. 77
- Position: Offensive tackle

Personal information
- Born: December 27, 1920; Amarillo, Texas, U.S.
- Died: September 24, 1948 (aged 27); Chicago, Illinois, U.S.
- Listed height: 6 ft 2 in (1.88 m)
- Listed weight: 225 lb (102 kg)

Career information
- High school: Amarillo
- College: Texas (1939–1942)
- NFL draft: 1943: 7th round, 53rd overall pick

Career history
- Chicago Cardinals (1946–1948)

Awards and highlights
- NFL champion (1947); Second-team All-Pro (1947); Arizona Cardinals No. 77 retired; Second-team All-American (1942); First-team All-SWC (1942); 1943 Cotton Bowl Classic Champion and Defensive MVP; 1942 SWC Conference Champion

Career NFL statistics
- Games played: 19
- Games started: 17
- Fumble recoveries: 2
- Stats at Pro Football Reference

Stanley Hubert Mauldin (December 27, 1920 – September 24, 1948) was an American football offensive tackle who won an NFL Championship with the Chicago Cardinals of the NFL and played college football for the Texas Longhorns. He died of a heart attack after a game against the Philadelphia Eagles in 1948.

Mauldin played high school football at Amarillo High School, from which he graduated in 1938. He went to Texas, following his older brother Dan who also played football there, where he became part of the "Immortal 13" team that upset Rose Bowl-bound Texas A&M, 7–0, in 1940. In 1941, he helped the Longhorns go 8–1–1 and finish the season ranked #4 (and winning some of the subsequent, mathematical "National Championships" like the Berryman QPRS). In 1942, he was a consensus All-Southwest Conference lineman, a 2nd team All-American and a key player as the team won the Conference Championship and upset #5 Georgia Tech in the Cotton Bowl to finish ranked #11. He was named the Cotton Bowl's defensive MVP that year.

After college he played football on service teams while in the military and in 1945, he was named to the All-Army Air Force Eleven.

He was drafted by the Chicago Cardinals in the seventh round of the 1943 draft (53rd overall) but didn't play for them until 1946. In 1947, he was a full-season starter as the team won the NFL Championship, the last one won by the organization as of 2024.

His number 77 is retired by the Cardinals. His cause of death is disputed by direct family members, as later accounts from Cardinal team members say he was accidentally kicked in the back of the skull during the course of the game, causing him to die of internal bleeding. He left behind a wife, Helen Hall Mauldin, and two boys, Richard "Dan" Mauldin, and Stanley Jr Mauldin.

Both of his sons played college football at Texas as well. Dan was a 2-year letterman who won a National Championship with the Longhorns in 1963, and the Orange Bowl in 1964 before going on to get his PhD in mathematics. Stanley was a 3-year letterman, after being a walk-on, who captained the 1971 team and won two National Championships (1969, 1970) with the Longhorns.

Stan Mauldin was inducted into the Texas High School Football Hall of Fame in 1970 and the Texas Longhorns Hall of Honor in 1969

== Military service ==
Stanley Mauldin served in the Army Air Corps during World War II. He flew 35 missions overseas in World War II.

== Sports Honors ==
- Named to the All-Army Air Force Eleven
- Member of the winning team, the Chicago Cardinals, in the NFL Championship in 1947.
- His NFL jersery number 77 is retired by the Cardinals organization
- Named "Outstanding Athlete" in 1942 by The University of Texas
- Inducted into the University of Texas Longhorn Hall of Honor in 1969
- Playing for Amarillo High School in the Texas Panhandle region, he was named "All-State" as a Center and Linebacker in 1938
- Inductee #12 for the Texas Panhandle Sports Hall of Fame

== Notable family and relatives ==
- Bill Mauldin (World War Two cartoonist)

== See also ==
- List of gridiron football players who died during their careers
