= Tom Alberghini =

American football player (1920–2013)

No. 69
- Positions: Tackle, guard

Personal information
- Born: October 27, 1920; Peabody, Massachusetts, U.S.
- Died: November 26, 2013 (aged 93); Bethesda, Maryland, U.S.
- Listed height: 5 ft 10 in (1.78 m)
- Listed weight: 200 lb (91 kg)

Career information
- High school: Peabody Veterans Memorial
- College: Holy Cross (1939-1942)
- NFL draft: 1943: 13th round, 115th overall pick

Career history
- Pittsburgh Steelers (1945)

Awards and highlights
- First-team All-Eastern (1942)

Career NFL statistics
- Games: 1
- Stats at Pro Football Reference

Thomas Joseph Alberghini (October 27, 1920 – November 26, 2013) was an American professional football offensive lineman in the National Football League (NFL). He was born in Peabody, Massachusetts.
