= 1942 All-Eastern football team =

American all-star college football team

The 1942 All-Eastern football team consists of American football players chosen by various selectors as the best players at each position among the Eastern colleges and universities during the 1942 college football season.

== All-Eastern selections ==
=== Backs ===
- Paul Governali, Columbia (AP-1; UP-1)
- Mike Holovak, Boston College (AP-1; UP-1)
- John Bezemes, Holy Cross (AP-1; UP-2)
- Bill Dutton, Pittsburgh (AP-1)
- Henry Mazur, Army (AP-2; UP-1)
- Walter Kretz, Cornell (UP-1)
- Steve Filipowicz, Fordham (AP-2; UP-2)
- Al Postus, Villanova (AP-2)
- Max Kielbasa, Duquesne (AP-2)
- Harry Connolly, Boston College (UP-2)
- Bert Stiff, Penn (UP-2)

=== Ends ===
- Don Currivan, Boston College (AP-1; UP-1)
- Bob Davis, Penn State (AP-1)
- Ed Murphy, Holy Cross (AP-2; UP-1)
- Bill Gallagher, Princeton (AP-2)
- Barney Kucsynski, Penn (UP-2)
- Jim Kelleher, Army (UP-2)

=== Tackles ===
- Robin Olds, Army (AP-1; UP-1)
- George Connor, Holy Cross (AP-1; UP-2)
- John Matisi, Duquesne (UP-1)
- George Perpich, Georgetown (AP-2)
- Fred Schnurr, Navy (AP-2)
- Gil Bouley, Boston College (UP-2)

=== Guards ===
- Ernest Alther, Syracuse (AP-1)
- Bob Orlando, Colgate (AP-1)
- Rocco Canale, Boston College (UP-1)
- Tom Alberghini, Holy Cross (UP-1)
- John Jaffurs, Penn State (AP-2; UP-2)
- Mortimer Shiekman, Penn (AP-2)
- Dave Collins, Navy (UP-2)

=== Centers ===
- Spencer Moseley, Yale (AP-1; UP-1)
- Fred Naumetz, Boston College (AP-2; UP-2)

== Key ==
- AP = Associated Press
- UP = United Press

== See also ==
- 1942 College Football All-America Team
