= 1942 All-Southwest Conference football team =

American college football all-star team

The 1942 All-Southwest Conference football team consists of American football players chosen by various organizations for All-Southwest Conference teams for the 1942 college football season. The selectors for the 1942 season included the Associated Press (AP) and the United Press (UP).

== All Southwest selections ==
=== Backs ===
- Cullen Rogers, Texas A&M (AP-1; UP-1)
- Leo Daniels, Texas A&M (AP-1; UP-1)
- Dick Dwelle, Rice (AP-1; UP-1)
- Roy McKay, Texas (AP-1; UP-1)

=== Ends ===
- Bruce Alford, Texas Christian (AP-1; UP-1)
- Bill Henderson, Texas A&M (AP-1; UP-1)

=== Tackles ===
- Derrell Palmer, Texas Christian (AP-1; UP-1)
- Stan Mauldin, Texas (AP-1; UP-1)

=== Guards ===
- Felix Bucek, Texas A&M (AP-1; UP-1)
- Weldon Humble, Rice (AP-1)
- Solon Barnett, Baylor (UP-1)

=== Centers ===
- Lester Gatewood, Baylor (AP-1; UP-1)

== Key ==
AP = Associated Press

Bold = Consensus first-team selection of both the AP and UP

== See also ==
- 1942 College Football All-America Team
