= Joe Sabasteanski =

American football player (1921–1972)

No. 21
- Positions: Guard, center, linebacker

Personal information
- Born: March 27, 1921; Portland, Maine, U.S.
- Died: July 1, 1972 (aged 51); New York, U.S.
- Listed height: 6 ft 0 in (1.83 m)
- Listed weight: 207 lb (94 kg)

Career information
- High school: Portland
- College: Fordham (1939–1942)
- NFL draft: 1943: 11th round, 94th overall pick

Career history

Playing
- Boston Yanks (1947–1948); New York Bulldogs (1949)

Coaching
- Fordham (1951) Offensive line coach; Adelphi (1952–1953) Head coach

Career NFL statistics
- Games played: 34
- Games started: 12
- Interceptions: 3
- Stats at Pro Football Reference

Joseph Edward Sabasteanski (February 24, 1921 – July 1, 1972) was an American professional football player who was an offensive lineman and linebacker in the National Football League (NFL).

== College career ==
Sabasteanski was a member of the football and track and field teams while at Fordham University. He replaced Lou DeFilippo as the Rams' starting center and started in the team's 1942 Sugar Bowl victory over Missouri. As a senior, Sabasteanski was named to the "Eastern Eleven" and an honorable mention All-American by the Associated Press and played in the 1943 East–West Shrine Bowl.

Sabasteanski competed in the 16 pound hammer throw on the track and field team. He won the event at the Metropolitan Intercollegiate Track and Field Championships in 1941 and 1942. He gave up his senior track and field season to enter the United States Marine Corps during World War II.

== Professional career ==
Sabasteanski was selected 94th overall by the Brooklyn Dodgers in the 11th round of the 1943 NFL draft. He signed with the Boston Yanks in January 1946 after being discharged from the Marines. He played two seasons with the Yanks and another with the team after they relocated and became the New York Bulldogs.

== Coaching career and later life ==
Sabasteanski returned to Fordham as an offensive line coach in 1951. He joined the coaching staff at Adelphi University in 1952 and was the Panthers' head coach in 1953, compiling a record of 4–3–1 in the final season before the football program was discontinued.

Sabasteanski died on July 1, 1972. He was posthumously inducted into the Fordham Athletics Hall of Fame in 1988 and the Maine Sports Hall of Fame in 1990.
