= Lloyd Wickett =

American football player (1920–2001)

No. 81, 20
- Position: Tackle

Personal information
- Born: April 3, 1920; Ontario, Canada
- Died: April 9, 2001 (aged 81); Jefferson, Oregon, U.S.
- Listed height: 6 ft 1 in (1.85 m)
- Listed weight: 208 lb (94 kg)

Career information
- High school: J. M. Weatherwax (Aberdeen, Washington, U.S.)
- College: Oregon State (1939–1942)
- NFL draft: 1943: 5th round, 31st overall pick

Career history
- Detroit Lions (1943); Los Angeles Bulldogs (1943); Detroit Lions (1946)

Career NFL statistics
- Games played: 14
- Games started: 2
- Fumble recoveries: 1
- Stats at Pro Football Reference

Lloyd Meldrum Wickett (April 3, 1920 – April 9, 2001) was an American football tackle who played professionally for the Detroit Lions of the National Football League (NFL).

Wickett played college football at Oregon State University and was drafted by the Detroit Lions in the fifth round of the 1943 NFL draft. He played four games for the Lions that year. He missed the 1944 and 1945 seasons while serving in the United States Navy during World War II, but returned to the Lions in 1946 and played 10 games for them.
