= Bob Friedman =

American football player (1921–1989)

- Friedman with Washington, 1939

No. 11, 72
- Position: Tackle

Personal information
- Born: September 11, 1921; Allentown, Pennsylvania, U.S.
- Died: December 9, 1989 (aged 68); Fort Lauderdale, Florida, U.S.
- Listed height: 6 ft 2 in (1.88 m)
- Listed weight: 215 lb (98 kg)

Career information
- High school: Allentown
- College: Washington (1939-1942)
- NFL draft: 1943: 18th round, 162nd overall pick

Career history
- Philadelphia Eagles (1944); Bethlehem Bulldogs (1946)

Career NFL statistics
- Games played: 10
- Games started: 8
- Interceptions: 1
- Stats at Pro Football Reference

Robert "Buck" Friedman (September 11, 1921 – December 9, 1989) was an American professional football tackle and orthopedic surgeon. He played college football for the University of Washington from 1939 to 1942 and professional football for the Philadelphia Eagles in 1944 and 1945. He attended pre-medical school while playing professional football. After his playing career ended, he attended medical school and was an orthopedic surgeon in Allentown, Pennsylvania, and later in Fort Lauderdale, Florida.

== Early life ==
Friedman was born in Allentown, Pennsylvania, in 1921. He attended Allentown High School. He was president of his junior and senior classes and captain of the football team. He also played for the basketball and track teams, competing in the shot put, discus and javelin and setting a school record in the discus throw. He graduated from Allentown High in 1939.

The school established the Robert Friedman Trophy in 1976, awarded each year to the school's outstanding athlete.

== University of Washington ==
Friedman played college football for the University of Washington Huskies from 1939 to 1942. He was considered an "iron man" who played on both offense and defense, mostly at tackle.

Friedman left Washington a year before graduation to join the Army.

== Professional football ==
Friedman was drafted by the Philadelphia Eagles in the 18th round (162nd pick) of the 1943 NFL draft. He signed a contract with the Eagles in August 1943. However, he was unable to join the team in 1943 due to his military service. He was medically discharged from the Army in early 1944 due to an old leg injury. He spent several months strengthening his foot was medically cleared to join the Eagles in 1944. He appeared in ten games for the 1944 Eagles, eight of them as starter at the left tackle position. Eagles coach Greasy Neale called Friedman "one of the most promising line recruits to come into pro ball in many years."

Friedman signed another contract with the Eagles in 1945, but did not appear in any regular-season games.

In 1946, Friedman played for the Bethlehem Bulldogs of the American Association. Friedman attended pre-medical school at Temple University while playing for the Eagles and Bulldogs and quit football in October 1946 to focus on his studies.

== Later life ==
Friedman, 1949

After his playing career ended, Friedman attended Philadelphia College of Osteopathic Medicine, graduating in 1949. After his residency in Philadelphia and two years in private practice in Allentown, Friedman worked from 1955 to 1976 at the Allentown Osteopathic Medical Center, eventually servig as head of orthopedic surgery. In 1976, he joined the orthopedic surgery department at Las Olas General Hospital in Fort Lauderdale, Florida.

Friedman was married to Helen Dragotta. They had two daughters, Sylvia and Robin. Friedman died in 1989 at age 68 at Holy Cross Hospital.
