= Ken Snelling =

American football player (1918–1994)

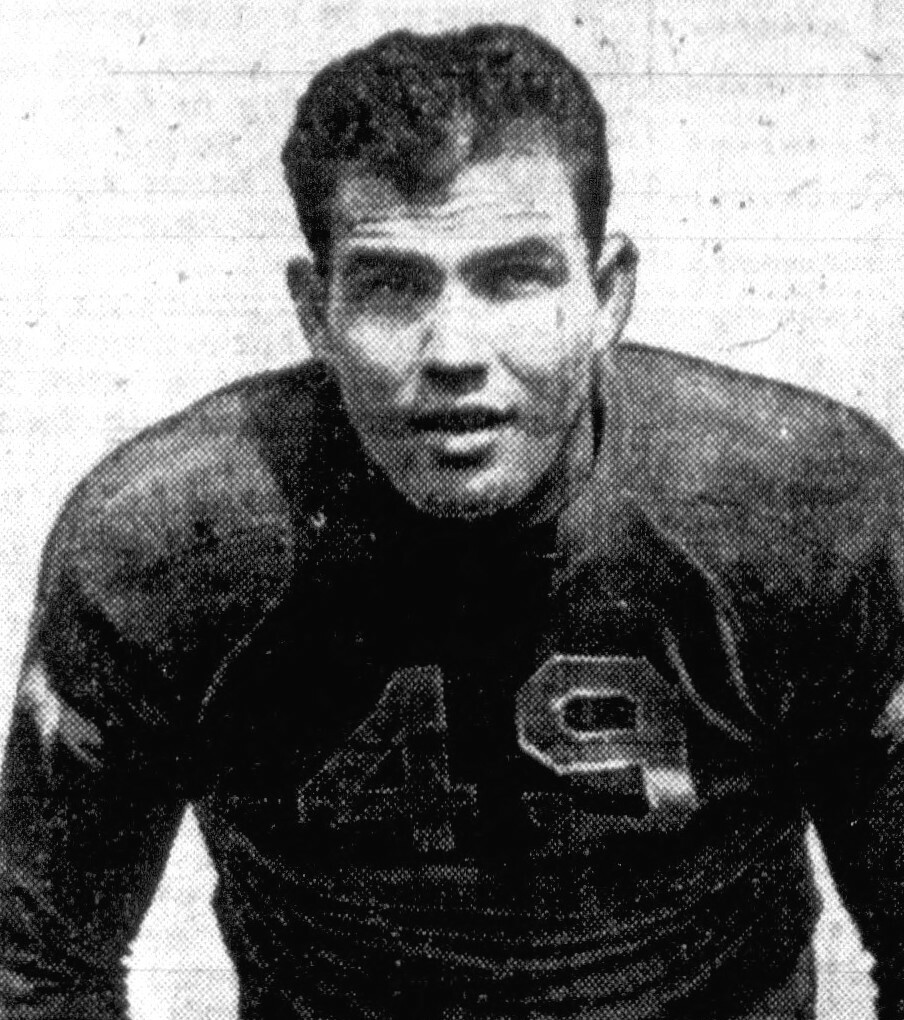
- Snelling, circa 1942

No. 52, 55
- Positions: Fullback, linebacker

Personal information
- Born: December 11, 1918; Musselshell, Montana, U.S.
- Died: September 17, 1994 (aged 75); Ruch, Oregon, U.S.
- Listed height: 6 ft 0 in (1.83 m)
- Listed weight: 210 lb (95 kg)

Career information
- High school: Bell (Bell, California)
- College: UCLA (1941–1942)
- NFL draft: 1943: 7th round, 58th overall pick

Career history
- Green Bay Packers (1945); Los Angeles Bulldogs (1946)

Career NFL statistics
- Rushing yards: 10
- Rushing average: 3.3
- Stats at Pro Football Reference

Kenneth Edward Snelling (December 11, 1918 – September 17, 1994) was a fullback in the National Football League (NFL). He was drafted by the Green Bay Packers in the seventh round of the 1943 NFL draft and later played with the team during the 1945 NFL season.
