= Jack Freeman (American football, born 1922) =

American football player (1922–1990)

No. 34
- Position: Guard

Personal information
- Born: January 20, 1922; Mexia, Texas, U.S.
- Died: July 23, 1990 (aged 68); Houston, Texas, U.S.
- Listed height: 6 ft 0 in (1.83 m)
- Listed weight: 198 lb (90 kg)

Career information
- High school: Mexia
- College: Texas
- NFL draft: 1943: 27th round, 257th overall pick

Career history
- Phil-Pitt Steagles (1943)*; Brooklyn Dodgers (1946)
- * Offseason or practice squad member only

Career NFL statistics
- Games played: 12
- Games started: 3
- Stats at Pro Football Reference

Jack Lenard Freeman (January 20, 1922 – July 23, 1990) was an American professional football player who was a guard for the Brooklyn Dodgers of the All-America Football Conference (AAFC). He played college football for the Texas Longhorns.

== College career ==
Freeman played football for the Texas Longhorns from 1938 to 1942. He was inducted into the Texas Longhorn Hall of Honor, which he helped organize, in 1989.

== Professional career ==
=== Philadelphia-Pittsburgh Steagles ===
Freeman was selected in the 27th round of the 1943 NFL draft by the Pittsburgh Steelers, who would later temporarily merge with the Philadelphia Eagles to form the Philadelphia-Pittsburgh Steagles for the 1943 NFL season.

However, Freeman did not play with the Steagles in 1943, as he was completing his Army Air Corps training at Randolph Air Base in San Antonio, Texas. He instead played football for two years at Randolph, and for one year at Fort Worth Army Air Base.

=== Brooklyn Dodgers ===
In 1946, Freeman moved to New York to play for the Brooklyn Dodgers of the All-America Football Conference. He played twelve games with the Dodgers, starting three of them.

== Personal life ==
Freeman and his wife Daisy, who he met while at the University of Texas, eloped in January 1943.

He died on July 23, 1990, at the age of 68.
