= Van Davis =

American football player (1921–1987)

No. 55
- Positions: Defensive end, end

Personal information
- Born: October 5, 1921; Philomath, Georgia, U.S.
- Died: July 11, 1987 (aged 65); Carrollton, Georgia, U.S.
- Listed height: 6 ft 2 in (1.88 m)
- Listed weight: 215 lb (98 kg)

Career information
- College: Georgia (1939-1942)
- NFL draft: 1943: 12th round, 108th overall pick

Career history
- New York Yankees (1947-1949)

Career AAFC statistics
- Receptions: 14
- Receiving yards: 254
- Touchdowns: 1
- Stats at Pro Football Reference

Van Andrew Davis Jr. (October 5, 1921 – July 11, 1987) was an American professional football defensive end. He was a member of the New York Yankees of the All-America Football Conference (AAFC).
