= Lloyd Wasserbach =

American football player (1921–1949)

No. 48, 37
- Position: Tackle

Personal information
- Born: January 30, 1921; Baileys Harbor, Wisconsin, U.S.
- Died: February 1, 1949 (aged 28); Ripon, Wisconsin, U.S.
- Listed height: 5 ft 11 in (1.80 m)
- Listed weight: 205 lb (93 kg)

Career information
- High school: Sturgeon Bay (Sturgeon Bay, Wisconsin)
- College: Wisconsin (1939-1942)
- NFL draft: 1943: 21st round, 198th overall pick

Career history
- Chicago Rockets (1946-1947)

Career AAFC statistics
- Games played: 17
- Games started: 3
- Interceptions: 1
- Stats at Pro Football Reference

Lloyd George Wasserbach (January 30, 1921 – February 1, 1949) was a player in the All-America Football Conference (AAFC) for the Chicago Rockets in 1946 and 1947 as a tackle. He played at the collegiate level at the University of Wisconsin–Madison. He was selected in the 21st round by the Green Bay Packers in the 1943 NFL draft, but was drafted into World War II before he had a chance to play for the team.

== Biography ==
Wasserbach was born Lloyd George Wasserbach on January 30, 1921, in Baileys Harbor, Wisconsin. He died on February 1, 1949, in a hotel fire in Ripon, Wisconsin.
