= Glen Sorenson =

American football player (1920–1972)

No. 33
- Position: Guard

Personal information
- Born: February 29, 1920; Salt Lake City, Utah, U.S.
- Died: February 26, 1972 (aged 51); Salt Lake City, Utah, U.S.
- Listed height: 6 ft 0 in (1.83 m)
- Listed weight: 217 lb (98 kg)

Career information
- High school: West High School (Utah)
- College: Utah State

Career history
- Green Bay Packers (1943–1945)

Awards and highlights
- NFL champion (1944)

Career statistics
- Games played: 27
- Stats at Pro Football Reference

Glen G. Sorenson (February 29, 1920 – February 26, 1972) was an American professional football player in the National Football League (NFL). Sorenson was born on February 29, 1920, in Salt Lake City, Utah, where he graduated from West High School. After high school, he attended Utah State University where he played as a guard for their football team. At Utah State, he was named all-Border Conference and selected for the all-Sigma Chi football team. He left the school after his junior year because the school no longer fielded a football team and signed with the Packers. He played 27 games over three seasons with the Green Bay Packers. He was on the 1944 Packers team that won the 1944 championship. Even though he signed with the team before the 1946 NFL season, he never played for the Packers again. He was noted as having only eight fingers.
