= Ken Roskie =

American football player (1920–1986)

No. 74, 50, 30
- Position: Fullback

Personal information
- Born: November 29, 1920; Rockford, Illinois, U.S.
- Died: August 1, 1986 (aged 65); Redmond, Washington, U.S.
- Listed height: 6 ft 1 in (1.85 m)
- Listed weight: 225 lb (102 kg)

Career information
- High school: Harlem (Machesney Park, Illinois)
- College: South Carolina
- NFL draft: 1943: 32nd round, 298th overall pick

Career history
- San Francisco 49ers (1946); Green Bay Packers (1948); Detroit Lions (1948)

Career NFL/AAFC statistics
- Rushing yards: 45
- Rushing average: 3
- Touchdowns: 1
- Return yards: 30
- Stats at Pro Football Reference

Kenneth Roskie (November 29, 1920 – August 1, 1986) was a player in the National Football League (NFL). He was drafted 298th overall by the Green Bay Packers in the thirty-second round of the 1943 NFL draft. Later he went on to play for the San Francisco 49ers of the All-America Football Conference (AAFC) before splitting the 1948 NFL season between the Packers and the Detroit Lions.

Roskie later became a coach, including at Washington from 1951 to 1953.
