= Solon Barnett =

American football player (1921–1998)

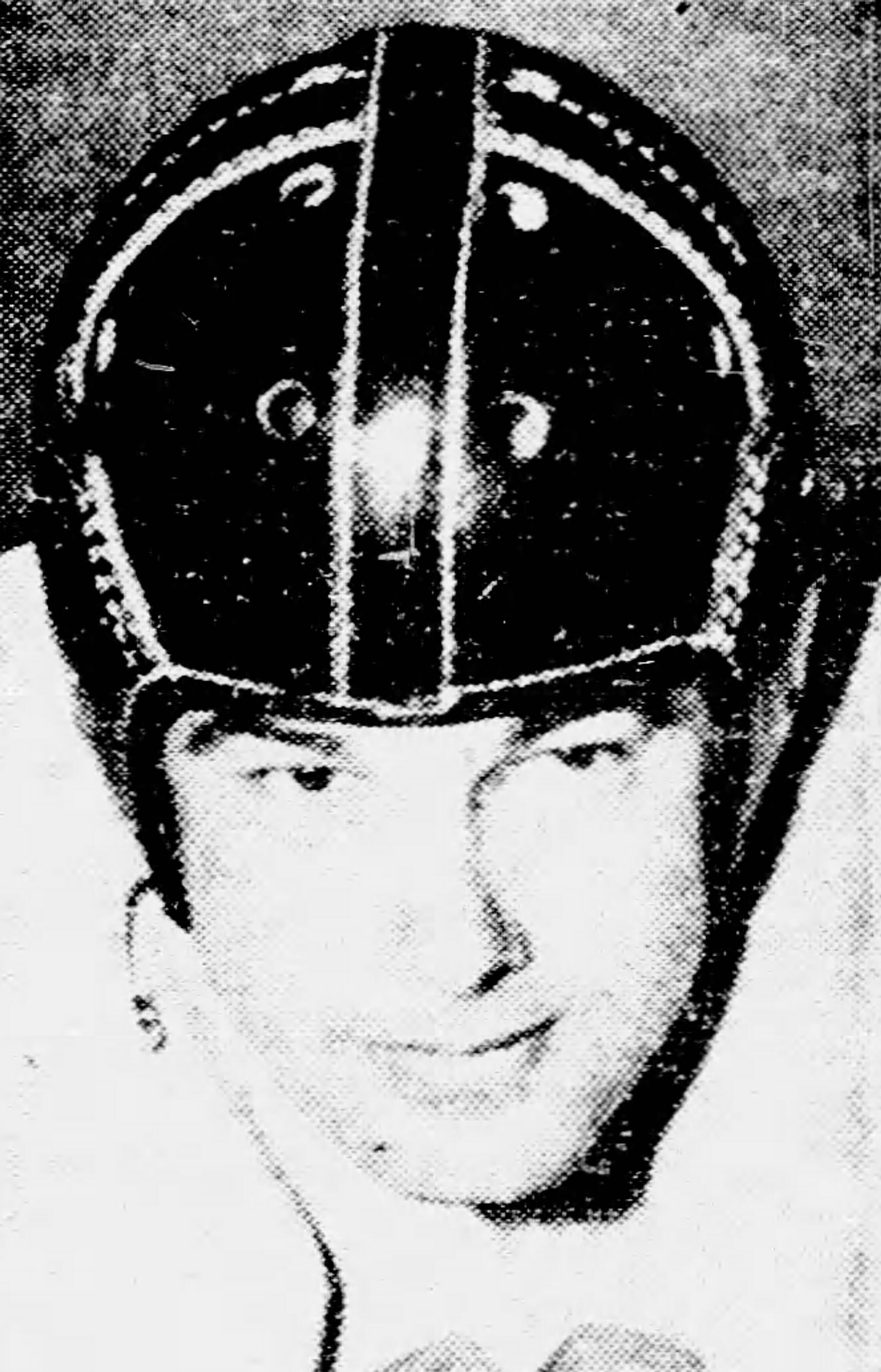
- Barnett c. 1943

No. 27, 72
- Positions: Tackle, guard

Personal information
- Born: March 30, 1921; New Willard, Texas, U.S.
- Died: July 18, 1998 (aged 77); Nacogdoches County, Texas, U.S.
- Listed height: 6 ft 1 in (1.85 m)
- Listed weight: 235 lb (107 kg)

Career information
- High school: Livingston (Livingston, Texas)
- College: Baylor (1939–1942); Southwestern (1943)
- NFL draft: 1945: 14th round, 134th overall pick

Career history
- Green Bay Packers (1945–1946)

Awards and highlights
- First-team All-SWC (1942)

Career NFL statistics
- Games played: 4 or 5 (Note: Sources conflict.)
- Games started: 1
- Stats at Pro Football Reference

Solon Slade Barnett Jr. (Note: One source gives his name as Solon Lilbert Barnett.) (March 30, 1921 – July 18, 1998) was an American professional football player who was a tackle and guard in the National Football League (NFL). He played college football for the Baylor Bears and Southwestern Pirates and was twice selected in the NFL draft: first by the Green Bay Packers in 1943 and then by the Chicago Cardinals in 1945. Barnett played for the Packers from 1945 to 1946.

== Early life ==
Barnett was born on March 30, 1921, in New Willard, Texas, United States. He attended Livingston High School, where he played football for four years and was nicknamed "Bubo". Barnett was the first player from Livingston to play in the NFL. In high school, he stood at 6 feet 1 inch (185 cm) and weighed 230 pounds (104 kg), playing as a fullback on offense and defensive tackle on defense, receiving comparisons to Bronko Nagurski by local fans. The Houston Post noted that when his coach first saw him, he said, "My lad, it's the forward wall for you," but then, after seeing his speed and ability to run with the ball, changed his mind and said, "Son, it's everywhere on the field for you". The Post commented that, "it's no hope for the foes, because when Livingston has the oval, big Bubo leads the blocking, and when the rivals tote the onion, Bubo smears everything but the cheerleader's rouge from his tackle post".

Barnett was described as "tank-resembling" and it was said that he was "unstopped by anything but a pastry window". His coach called him one of the greatest blockers he had ever seen, but The Post nonetheless said Barnett was not a "mean" player, saying that "It's perhaps a good thing he isn't. District 10 has a schedule mapped that it wants to finish". As a senior, he was unanimously selected to the All-District 10-A team. After his high school graduation, Barnett initially decided to attend Louisiana State University (LSU). He later changed his mind and enrolled at Baylor University in 1939.

== College career ==
As a freshman at Baylor in 1939, Barnett moved from the backfield to tackle. He served as a starting tackle for the school's freshman team. Barnett injured his ankle at the start of the 1940 season but came back and eventually moved into a starting role after injuries to several other players, impressing his coaches. The 1940 Baylor team compiled a record of 4–6. He remained a starter in 1941 and saw time at tackle and guard, posting what were described as some of the best performances of his career. The 1941 Bears posted a record of 3–6–1. Despite their poor record, they managed to tie, 7–7, number-one ranked Texas, with Barnett having what was described by The Waco Times-Herald as his greatest performance against them. The Times-Herald noted that, "Seldom in the history of football in this state has a guard played better football for one game than Barnett played against the Longhorns," but "otherwise for that season, he was just a fair guard". He helped the Bears to a record of 6–4–1 in 1942 and was reported by the local paper to have played "a far more consistent brand of ball" in what was his last year with the team. At the end of the season, he was named first-team All-Southwest Conference (SWC) by the United Press and received an invite to the East–West Shrine Game.

Barnett was selected by the Green Bay Packers in the 10th round (88th overall) of the 1943 NFL draft, but was drafted to serve with the United States Marine Corps and did not join the team that year. Instead, he was sent, along with many other players from Texas colleges, to Southwestern University, as part of his Marine unit. At Southwestern, he joined the football team and started at left tackle during the 1943 season, helping them compile a record of 10–1–1. Their tie came against ranked-opponent Tulsa, in which Barnett made a key play by stripping the ball from Clyde Goodnight, leading to Southwestern's tying score. Barnett, who joined the Marines in July 1943, was medically discharged in mid-1944 and worked as a firefighter in Lufkin, Texas, later that year.

== Professional career and later life ==
Barnett was selected by the Green Bay Packers in the 10th round (88th overall) of the 1943 NFL draft. He was later selected by the Chicago Cardinals in the 14th round (134th overall) of the 1945 NFL draft. Instead of joining the Cardinals, he signed with the Green Bay Packers at the start of October 1945. The Green Bay Press-Gazette noted that he "came along rapidly and was used frequently at tackle in the last several games". Barnett became one of the first three people from Southwestern to play in the NFL, and remains one of only nine all-time. He appeared in between two and four games, all as a backup, while the 1945 Packers compiled a record of 6–4. After the season, in February 1946, Barnett re-signed with the Packers. He appeared in only one or two games before being waived in early October. He did not play for any other team, concluding his NFL career with four or five games played.

After Barnett's playing career, he lived in Lufkin and married a former Baylor classmate. He died on July 18, 1998, in Nacogdoches County, Texas, at the age of 77.
