= Paul Faust =

American football player (born 1943)

No. 52
- Position: Linebacker

Personal information
- Born: July 23, 1943 (age 83); Minneapolis, Minnesota U.S.
- Listed height: 6 ft 1 in (1.85 m)
- Listed weight: 225 lb (102 kg)

Career information
- High school: Edina
- College: Minnesota
- NFL draft: 1966: undrafted

Career history
- Minnesota Vikings (1967)
- Stats at Pro Football Reference

Paul Timothy Faust (July 23, 1943) is an American former professional football player who was a linebacker for the Minnesota Vikings of National Football League (NFL). He played college football for the University of Minnesota.
