= Lester Gatewood =

American football player (1921–1965)

Les Gatewood
No. 33
- Position: Center

Personal information
- Born: May 30, 1921; Dallas, Texas, U.S.
- Died: April 9, 1965 (aged 43); Oklahoma City, Oklahoma, U.S.
- Listed height: 6 ft 2 in (1.88 m)
- Listed weight: 198 lb (90 kg)

Career information
- High school: Waco (Waco, Texas)
- College: Baylor; Tulane
- NFL draft: 1943: 8th round, 68th overall pick

Career history
- Green Bay Packers (1946–1947)

Awards and highlights
- 2× Third-team All-American (1942, 1943); First-team All-SEC (1943); First-team All-SWC (1942)

Career NFL statistics
- Games played: 23
- Games started: 6
- Fumble recoveries: 2
- Stats at Pro Football Reference

Lester Boyd "Buddy" Gatewood (May 30, 1921 – April 9, 1965) was an American professional football player who was a center for the Green Bay Packers of the National Football League (NFL). He played college football for the Baylor Bears and Tulane Green Wave.

== Biography ==
Gatewood was born in Dallas, Texas, and played college football at Baylor University and Tulane University. He was selected by the Green Bay Packers in the eighth round of the 1943 NFL draft and played two seasons with the team. He died in Oklahoma City, Oklahoma at the age of 43 from a heart attack.
