= Bob Forte =

American football player (1922–1996)

No. 8
- Positions: Halfback, defensive back, linebacker

Personal information
- Born: July 15, 1922; Lake Village, Arkansas, U.S.
- Died: March 12, 1996 (aged 73); Dallas, Texas, U.S.
- Listed height: 6 ft 0 in (1.83 m)
- Listed weight: 199 lb (90 kg)

Career information
- High school: Lakeside (Arkansas)
- College: Arkansas
- NFL draft: 1943: 11th round, 98th overall pick

Career history
- Green Bay Packers (1946–1950, 1952–1953)

Awards and highlights
- Green Bay Packers Hall of Fame (1973)

Career NFL statistics
- Rushing yards: 331
- Rushing average: 3.1
- Receptions: 24
- Receiving yards: 242
- Interceptions: 23
- Fumble recoveries: 11
- Total touchdowns: 4
- Stats at Pro Football Reference

Robert Dominic Forte (July 15, 1922 – March 12, 1996) was an American professional football player for the Green Bay Packers in the National Football League (NFL). Forte was a two-way player for the Packers during the end of the one-platoon system, playing halfback on offense and defensive back/linebacker on defense.

Following his retirement from football, Forte worked as a radio analyst for the Packers, a television sports director, and as a member of the sports department of the Miller Brewing Company of Milwaukee.

== Early life and college ==
Bob Forte was born July 15, 1922, in Lake Village, Arkansas, a small town in the southeastern part of the state. He began playing sandlot football with neighborhood children, gaining skill as a powerful runner.

Forte attended the University of Arkansas for whom he played in the 1940, 1941, and 1942 seasons, playing halfback on offense and linebacker on defense. He was twice named an All-Conference player and was named to several All-American team lists.

== Career ==
=== Military service ===
Forte was drafted by the Green Bay Packers of the National Football League in the 11th round (98th pick) of the 1943 NFL draft. However, with World War II raging, instead of joining the team, Forte entered the United States Army, in which he served for three years as a first lieutenant of a tank battalion in the 8th Armored Division in the European theater.

After this stint under General George S. Patton in the Third Army, Forte was discharged in May 1946 and returned to life as a civilian.

=== Professional football ===
After his return from Europe, Forte began a seven-season career playing for the Packers, interrupted by the Korean War, during which he was recalled to active duty for 15 months. Forte became one of only 14 NFL players to serve in both World War II and the Korean War.

After missing the 1951 NFL campaign due to military service, Forte returned to the Packers, by whom he was elected as team captain in 1952 and 1953.

In 1973, Forte was enshrined in the Green Bay Packers Hall of Fame in recognition of his accomplishments on and off the field.

=== Post-football ===
Forte began working in the off-season for the Miller Brewing Company of Milwaukee in 1952, serving as a special representative of the company's sports department, making appearances on behalf of the brewery to talk football before athletic and civic groups. He also worked as an analyst for the Packers on the teams radio broadcasts and was hired to be the sports director WISN and WISN-TV in 1956.

In 1957 he returned to Miller Brewing's elaborate sports department on a full-time basis. He narrated eight new films for the company made in 1958 — four of which dealt with football exclusively, including a 30-minute short on the 1957 NFL Championship Game between the Detroit Lions and the Cleveland Browns.

== Personal life ==
Bob Forte died in 1996 at the age of 73.
