= John Finn (American football) =

American football player and coach (1895–1970)

Jack Finn
Biographical details
- Born: August 27, 1895; Bethlehem, Pennsylvania, U.S.
- Died: December 25, 1970 (aged 75); Bethlehem, Pennsylvania, U.S.

Playing career
- 1921: Villanova
- 1922–1923: Moravian
- 1924: Frankford Yellow Jackets
- Position: Back

Coaching career (HC unless noted)
- 1931–1932: Moravian

Head coaching record
- Overall: 6–8–3

John Thomas Finn (August 27, 1895 – December 25, 1970) was an American football player and coach. He played professionally as running back in the National Football League (NFL) for the Frankford Yellow Jackets 1924 season. Finn served as the head football coach at Moravian College—now known as Moravian University—in Bethlehem, Pennsylvania from 1931 to 1932, compiling a record of 6–8–3.

Finn was born in Bethlehem and served in the United States Navy on a submarine during World War I. He later worked as a safety superintendent for Bethlehem Steel until retiring in 1960. He died on December 25, 1970, at Holy Family Manor in Bethlehem.
