= Larry Fuller (American football) =

American football player (1923–2005)

No. 12
- Position: Running back

Personal information
- Born: January 28, 1923; Faust, New York
- Died: April 6, 2005 (aged 82)

Career information
- College: Did Not Attend

Career history
- 1944–1945: Washington Redskins
- 1945: Chicago Cardinals
- Stats at Pro Football Reference

Lawrence Fuller (January 28, 1923 – April 6, 2005) was an American football running back in the National Football League for the Washington Redskins and the Chicago Cardinals. He did not attend college.
