= Andy Feichtinger =

American football player (1897–1962)

Personal information
- Born: November 16, 1897; Salem, Oregon, U.S.
- Died: December 14, 1962 (aged 65); Oregon, U.S.
- Listed height: 5 ft 10 in (1.78 m)
- Listed weight: 170 lb (77 kg)

Career history
- Decatur Staleys (1920)

Career statistics
- Games played: 4
- Stats at Pro Football Reference

Andrew Joseph Feichtinger (November 16, 1897 – December 14, 1962) was an American professional football end who played for one season for the Decatur Staleys of the National Football League (NFL). He never attended any college.
