= Jug Bennett =

American football player (1920–1992)

No. 15
- Position: Guard

Personal information
- Born: February 27, 1920; Skiatook, Oklahoma, U.S.
- Died: October 2, 1992 (aged 72); Wichita Falls, Texas, U.S.
- Listed height: 5 ft 8 in (1.73 m)
- Listed weight: 188 lb (85 kg)

Career information
- High school: Graham (Graham, Texas)
- College: Hardin-Simmons
- NFL draft: 1943: 23rd round, 218th overall pick

Career history
- Green Bay Packers (1946)

Career NFL statistics
- Games played: 3
- Stats at Pro Football Reference

Earl Clinton "Jug" Bennett (February 27, 1920 – October 2, 1992) was an American professional football player who was a guard for the Green Bay Packers of the National Football League (NFL). Drafted in the twenty-third round of the 1943 NFL draft by the Packers out of Hardin–Simmons University, Bennett played in only one season in 1946 after serving in the United States Army as an aerial gunner during World War II. After his football career, he went into the oil drilling business.

== Early life ==
Earl Bennett was born on February 27, 1920, in Skiatook, Oklahoma. He was given the nickname "Jug". He attended Graham High School in Graham, Texas, and then played college football at Hardin–Simmons University. During his time at Hardin-Simmons, he was the football team's co-captain and played in the Sun Bowl.

== Military service ==
Bennett entered the United States Army in 1943. He served during World War II before being discharged in 1946. During his service time, Bennett was an aerial gunner in the European Theater, receiving the Air Medal (with two clusters) and the European Theater ribbon (with four battle stars). He played on various military football teams during his service.

== Career ==
Bennett was drafted by the Green Bay Packers in the 23rd round of the 1943 NFL draft and later played with the team during the 1946 NFL season under head coach Curly Lambeau. During his rookie season, he challenged Russ Letlow and other rookies for the right guard position. During his time with the Packers, he was regarded as the smallest guard in the history of the NFL and was known as the "Watch Charm Guard". He only appeared in three games for the Packers in 1946 and never played in the NFL again.

After his playing career, Bennett went into oil drilling with fellow Packers Ed Neal. Bennett, his father and his brother created the Bennett Well Service and continued working in the oil industry into the 1960s. He had other business enterprises, including ranching and founding a nursing home.

== Personal life ==
Bennett was a member of the American Legion. He also served on the boards of numerous associations, including the West Central Texas Cutting Horse Association, the Graham Chamber of Commerce, the American Cutting Horse Association, the Graham Lions Club and the North Texas Oil & Gas Association. Bennett had a wife and one son; he died on October 2, 1992, at the age of 72.
