= Mart High School =

Location
- 1100 J.L. Davis Ave. Mart, Texas 76664-1405; United States
- Coordinates: 31°32′28″N 96°49′45″W

Information
- School type: Public high school
- Established: 1906; 120 years ago
- School district: Mart Independent School District
- Superintendent: David Hayward
- Principal: Amy Stone, Elementary Ashley Wilton, High School
- Teaching staff: 21.52 (FTE)
- Grades: 7–12
- Enrollment: 603 (2025–2026)
- Student to teacher ratio: 11.34
- Colors: Purple; Gold
- Athletics conference: UIL Class AA
- Mascot: Panthers/Lady Panthers
- Website: www.martisd.org

Mart High School is a public high school located in Mart, Texas, United States' it is classified as a 2A school by the University Interscholastic League. It is part of the Mart Independent School District located in eastern McLennan County. In 2015, the school was rated "met standard" by the Texas Education Agency.

== History ==
Mart High School was established in 1906 and graduated its first senior class in 1908; it used its main building until 2017. A new high school was set to be completed in 2019. Integration between Mart and all-black Anderson High school began in 1966 and was fully integrated by 1970 after Anderson High School graduated its last class in 1969.

Mart High School is known statewide for its success in football, compiling over 700 wins, ranking them in the top five in the state and in the top 20 nationally.

== Athletics ==
The Mart Panthers compete in:

- Baseball
- Basketball
- Football
- Golf
- Softball
- Track and field
- Volleyball

=== State titles ===
- Basketball -
  - 1976 (2A)
- Football -
  - 1957 (1A), 1969 (1A), 1999 (2A/D1), 2006 (2A/D2), 2010 (1A/D1), 2017 (2A/D1), 2018 (2A/D2), 2019 (2A/D2)
- Boys Golf -
  - 1981 (2A)
- Boys Track -
  - 1970 (1A), 1978 (1A)

==== State finalists ====
- Football -
  - 1986 (2A), 2000 (2A/D2), 2008 (1A/D1), 2012 (1A/D1) 2020 (2A/D2), 2022 (2A/D2), 2023 (2A/D2)

== Notable alumni ==
- Jesse Plemons, actor
- Quan Cosby, professional football player
