= Eddie Forrest (American football) =

American football player (1921–2001)

No. 34
- Position: Guard

Personal information
- Born: June 12, 1921; San Francisco, California, U.S.
- Died: May 29, 2001 (aged 79); Palo Alto, California, U.S.
- Listed height: 5 ft 11 in (1.80 m)
- Listed weight: 210 lb (95 kg)

Career information
- High school: St. Ignatius (San Francisco)
- College: Santa Clara
- NFL draft: 1943: 20th round, 188 (by the Green Bay Packers)th overall pick

Career history
- San Francisco 49ers (1946-1947)

Career AAFC statistics
- Games played: 25
- Games started: 5
- Stats at Pro Football Reference

Edwin George Forrest (June 12, 1921 – May 29, 2001) was an American professional football player who was a guard for two seasons with the San Francisco 49ers of the All-America Football Conference (AAFC). He played college football for the Santa Clara Broncos.
