= Mart, Texas =

- City
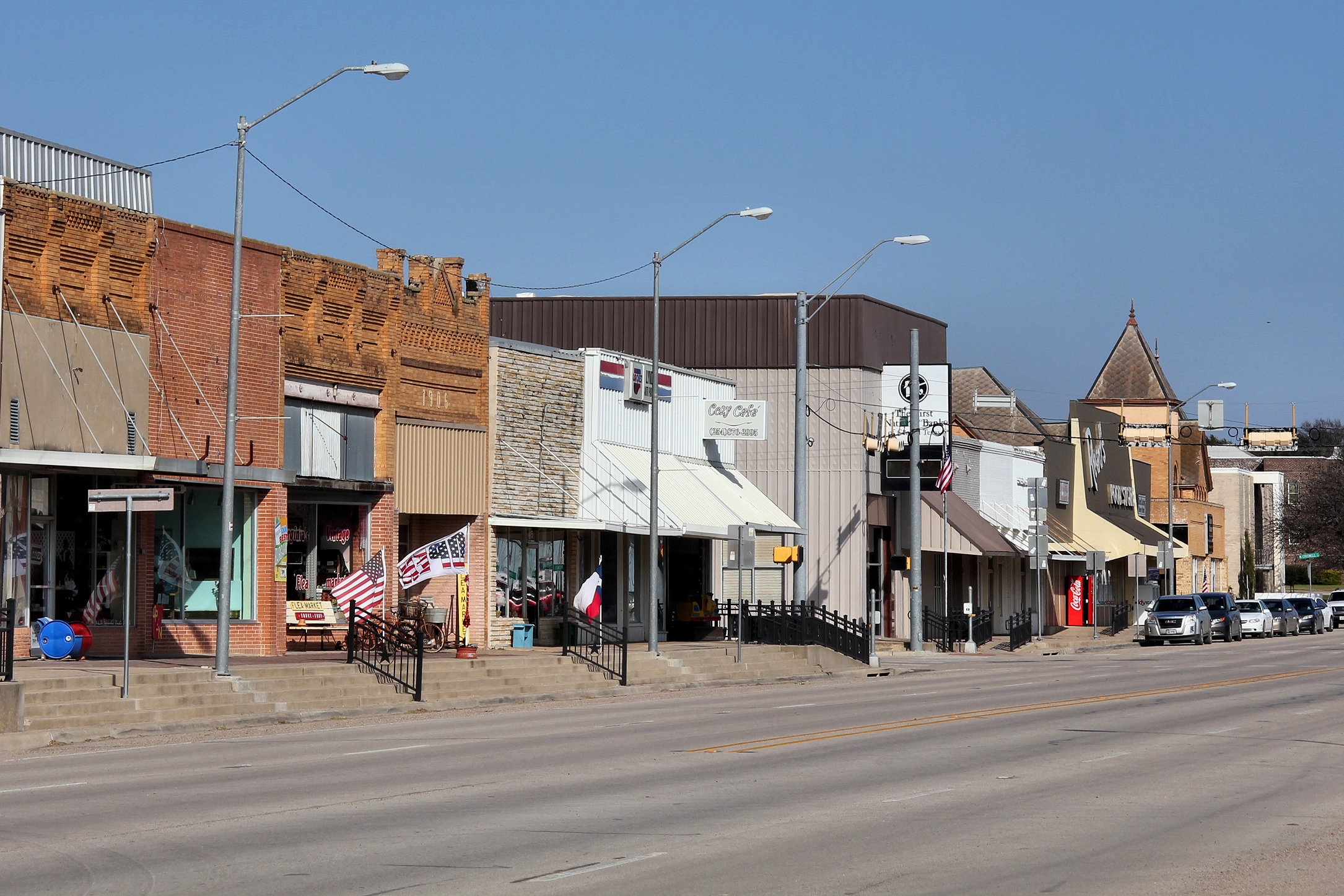
- Downtown Mart, Texas

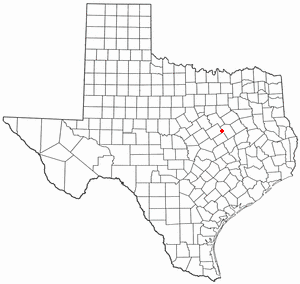
- Location of Mart, Texas

- Coordinates: 31°32′31″N 96°49′49″W
- Country: United States
- State: Texas
- Counties: McLennan, Limestone

Area
  - Total: 1.31 sq mi (3.40 km^{2})
  - Land: 1.31 sq mi (3.40 km^{2})
  - Water: 0 sq mi (0.00 km^{2})
- Elevation: 532 ft (162 m)

Population (2020)
  - Total: 1,748
  - Density: 1,682/sq mi (649.5/km^{2})
- Time zone: UTC-6 (Central (CST))
  - Summer (DST): UTC-5 (CDT)
- ZIP code: 76664
- Area code: 254
- FIPS code: 48-46824
- GNIS feature ID: 2411043
- Website: www.cityofmart.org

Mart is a city in Limestone and McLennan Counties in the U.S. state of Texas. Its population was 1,748 at the 2020 census.

== Geography ==
According to the United States Census Bureau, the city has a total area of 1.3 square miles (3.4 km^{2}), all land.

== Demographics ==
Historical population
Census	Pop.	Note	%±
1910	2,939		—
1920	3,105		5.6%
1930	2,853		−8.1%
1940	2,856		0.1%
1950	2,269		−20.6%
1960	2,197		−3.2%
1970	2,183		−0.6%
1980	2,324		6.5%
1990	2,004		−13.8%
2000	2,273		13.4%
2010	2,209		−2.8%
2020	1,748		−20.9%
U.S. Decennial Census

=== Racial and ethnic composition ===
Mart city, Texas – Racial and ethnic composition Note: the US Census treats Hispanic/Latino as an ethnic category. This table excludes Latinos from the racial categories and assigns them to a separate category. Hispanics/Latinos may be of any race.
Race / Ethnicity (NH = Non-Hispanic)	Pop 2000	Pop 2010	Pop 2020	% 2000	% 2010	% 2020
White alone (NH)	1,491	1,252	954	65.60%	56.68%	54.58%
Black or African American alone (NH)	622	626	446	27.36%	28.34%	25.51%
Native American or Alaska Native alone (NH)	9	17	14	0.40%	0.77%	0.80%
Asian alone (NH)	1	6	1	0.04%	0.27%	0.06%
Native Hawaiian or Pacific Islander alone (NH)	0	0	1	0.00%	0.00%	0.06%
Other race alone (NH)	0	0	4	0.00%	0.00%	0.23%
Mixed race or Multiracial (NH)	18	26	108	0.79%	1.18%	6.18%
Hispanic or Latino (any race)	132	282	220	5.81%	12.77%	12.59%
Total	2,273	2,209	1,748	100.00%	100.00%	100.00%

=== 2020 census ===
As of the 2020 census, Mart had 1,748 people, 657 households, and 450 families residing in the city.

The median age was 38.8 years; 26.3% of residents were under 18, and 17.5% were 65 or older. For every 100 females, there were 88.2 males, and for every 100 females 18 and over, there were 84.5 males 18 and over.

Of the 657 households in Mart, 35.2% had children under 18 living in them, 41.4% were married-couple households, 18.1% were households with a male householder and no spouse or partner present, and 32.6% were households with a female householder and no spouse or partner present. About 26.2% of all households were made up of individuals, and 10.2% had someone living alone who was 65 or older.

The 808 housing units were 18.7% vacant. The homeowner vacancy rate was 5.8% and the rental vacancy rate was 14.8%.

None of residents lived in urban areas, while 100.0% lived in rural areas.

Racial composition as of the 2020 census
Race	Number	Percent
White	1,014	58.0%
Black or African American	462	26.4%
American Indian and Alaska Native	20	1.1%
Asian	1	0.1%
Native Hawaiian and other Pacific Islander	1	0.1%
Some other race	84	4.8%
Two or more races	166	9.5%

=== 2000 census ===
As of the 2000 census, 2,273 people, 832 households, and 550 families resided in the city. The population density was 1,692.0 inhabitants per square mile (653.3/km^{2}). The 934 housing units averaged 695.2 per square mile (269.1/km^{2}). The racial makeup of the city was 68.28% White, 27.54% African American, 0.48% Native American, 0.04% Asian, 2.46% from other races, and 1.19% from two or more races. Hispanics or Latinos of any race were 5.81% of the population.

Of the 832 households, 29.2% had children under 18 living with them, 45.8% were married couples living together, 17.3% had a female householder with no husband present, and 33.8% were not families. About 31.9% of all households were made up of individuals, and 18.5% had someone living alone who was 65 or older. The average household size was 2.53 and the average family size was 3.21.

In the city, the age distribution was 31.1% under 18, 6.6% from 18 to 24, 22.7% from 25 to 44, 18.7% from 45 to 64, and 20.9% who were 65 or older. The median age was 36 years. For every 100 females, there were 85.4 males. For every 100 females 18 and over, there were 76.3 males.

The median income in the city for a household was $26,603 and for a family was $33,203. Males had a median income of $26,750 versus $19,784 for females. The per capita income for the city was $12,721. About 15.9% of families and 20.8% of the population were below the poverty line, including 34.3% of those under 18 and 7.7% of those 65 or over.

== Education ==
The city is served by the Mart Independent School District.

== Gallery ==
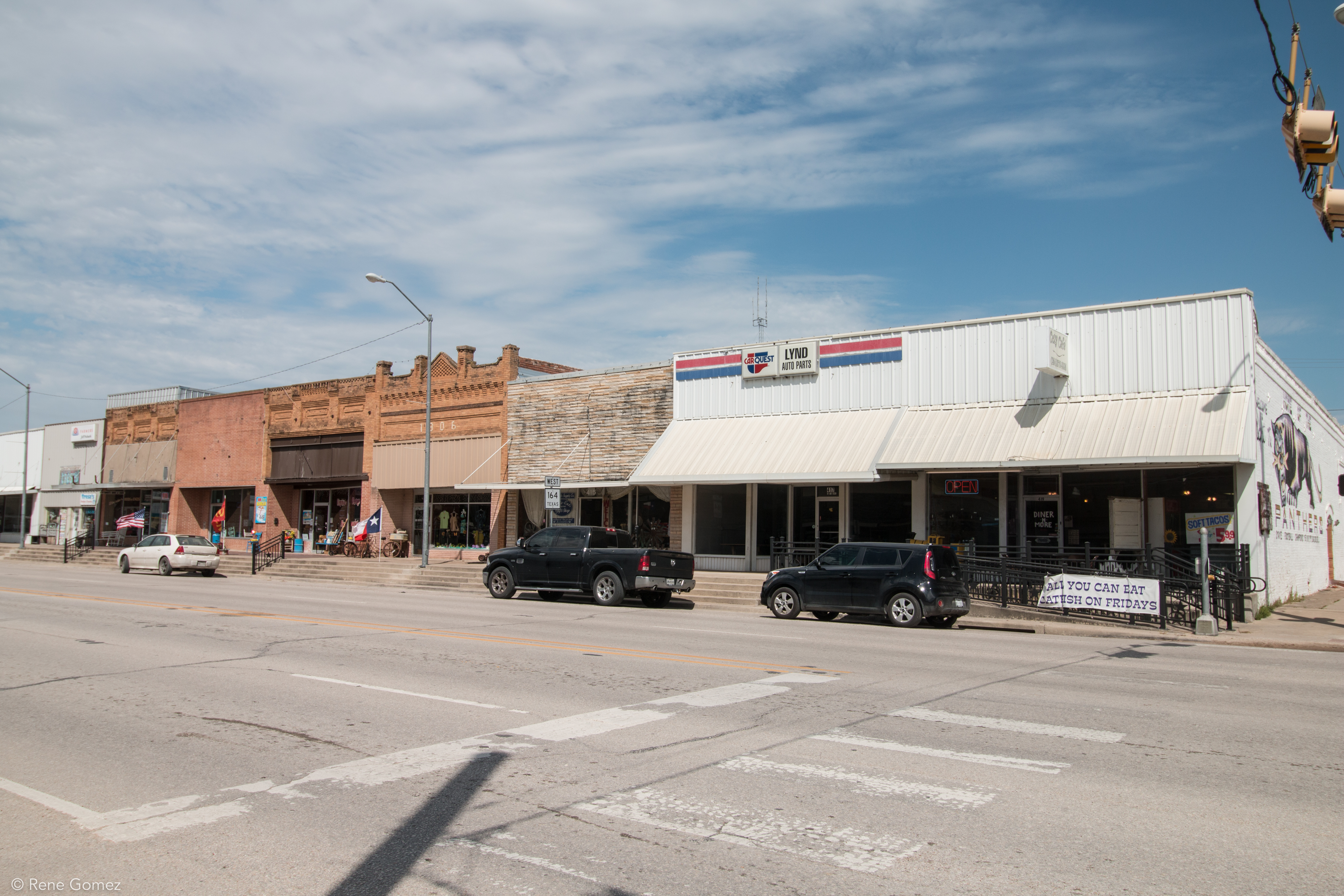
Downtown Mart, Texas

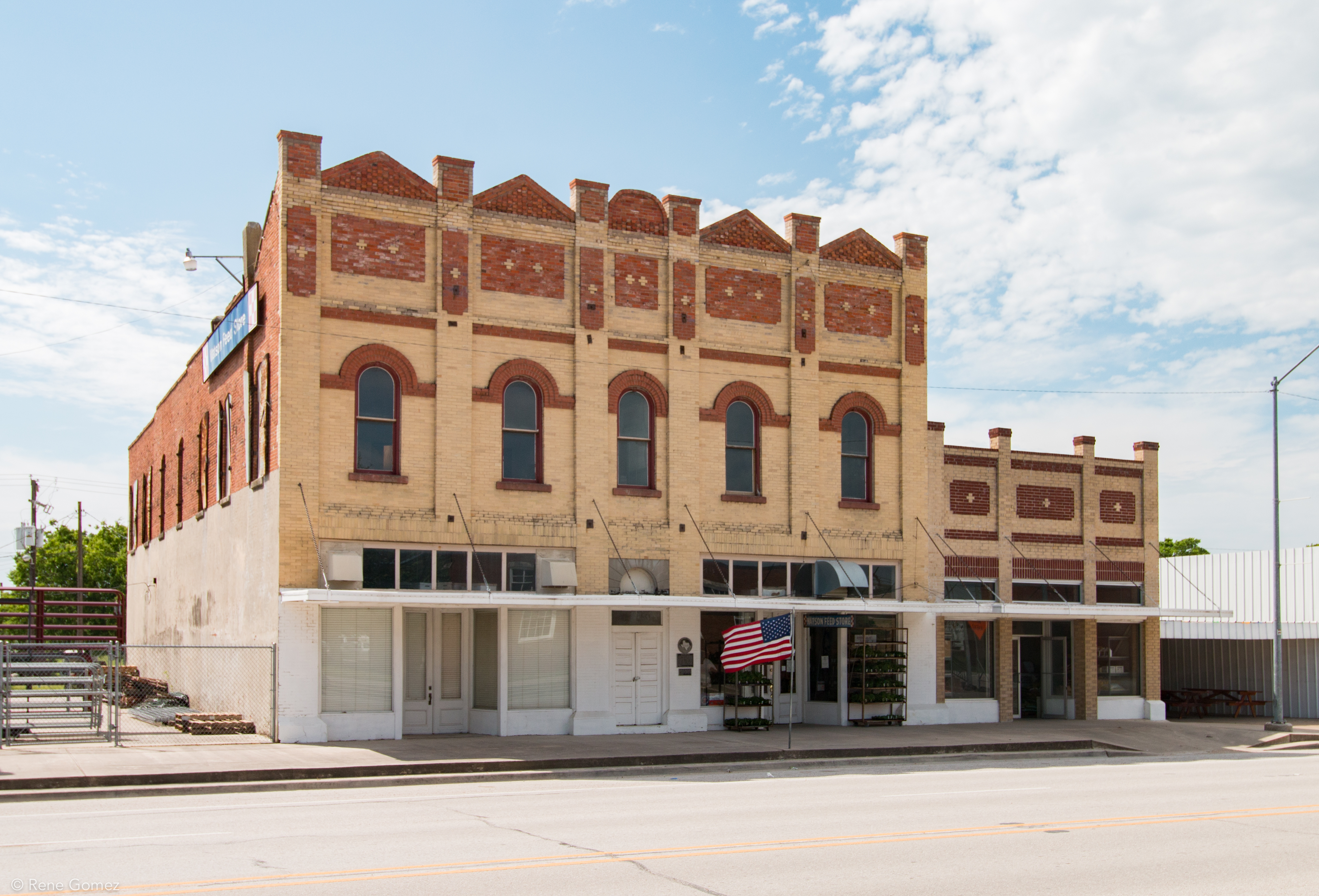
Waston Feed Store

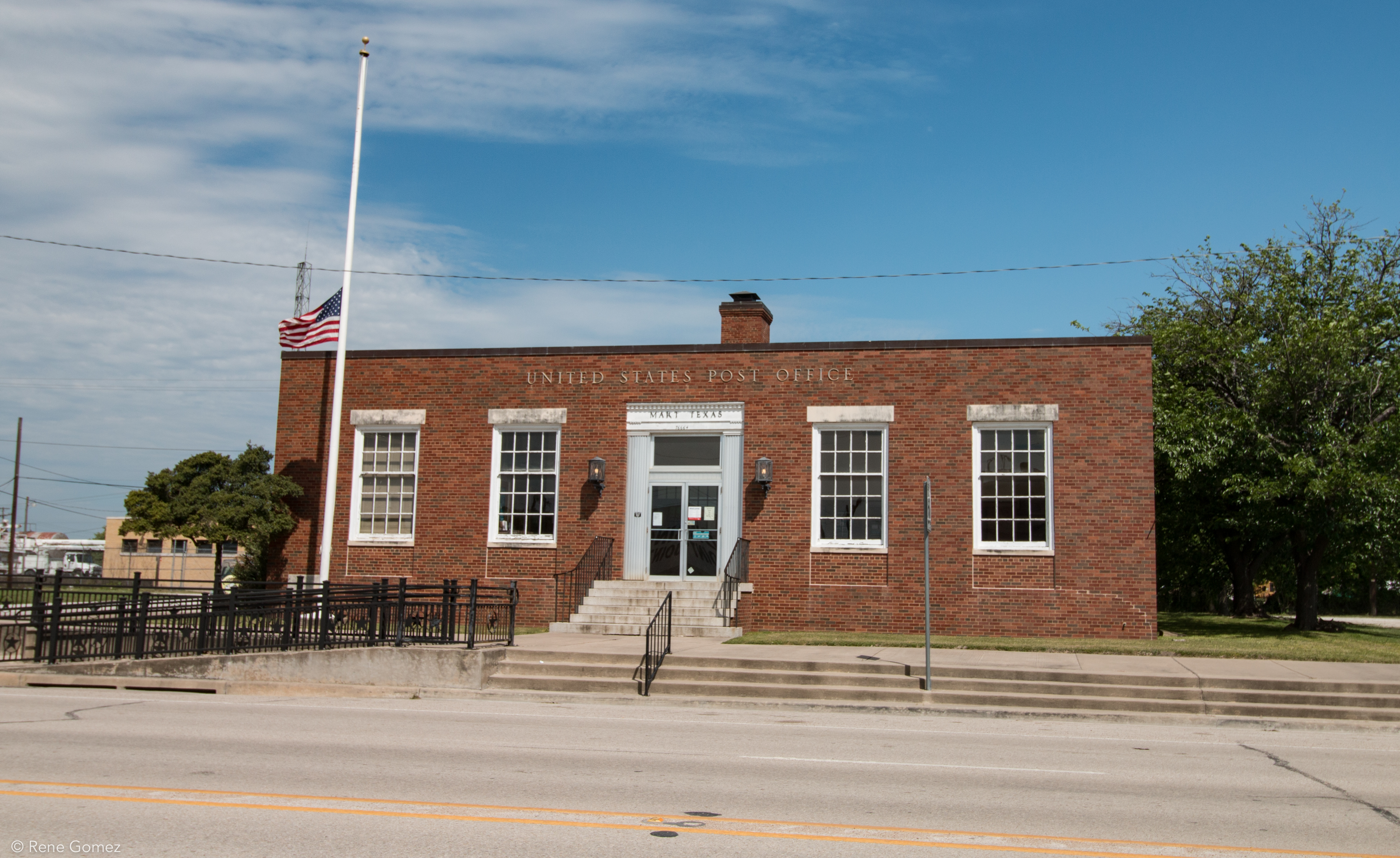
United States Post Office

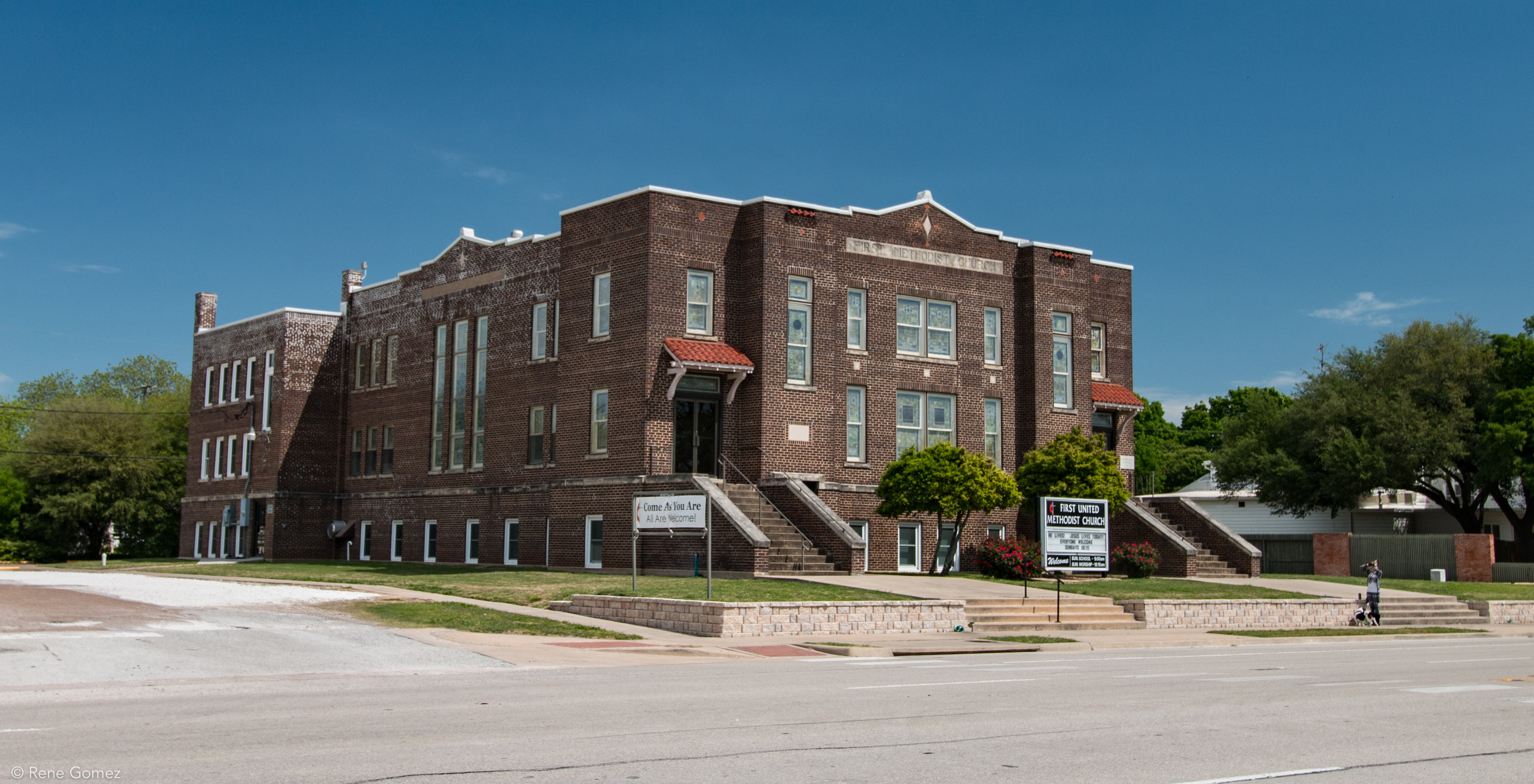
First United Methodist Church

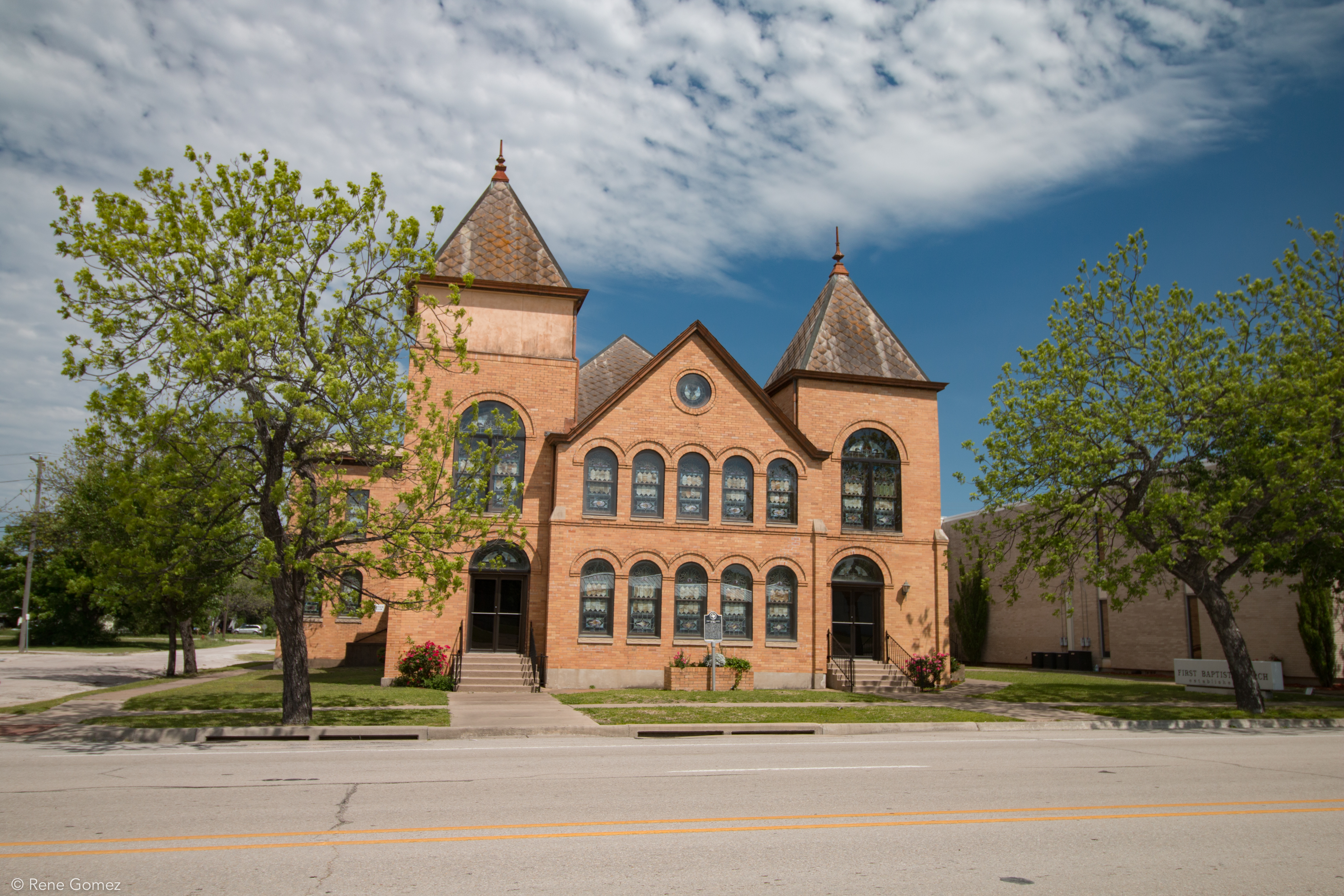
First Baptist Church

== Government and infrastructure ==
The Texas Department of Juvenile Justice operates the McLennan County State Juvenile Correctional Facility (Unit I and Unit II) in unincorporated McLennan County, near Mart.

== Notable people ==
- Quan Cosby, a former wide receiver for the University of Texas and player for four NFL teams is a native of Mart.
- Frankie Lee, soul blues singer, was born in Mart.
- Jesse Plemons, actor known for the TV series Friday Night Lights, Breaking Bad and Fargo, was raised in Mart.
- Cullen Rogers, football player for Texas A&M and Pittsburgh Steelers
- E. Donnall Thomas, 1990 Nobel laureate in physiology or medicine
- Cindy Walker, a Country Music Hall of Fame songwriter
