= 1942 Big Ten Conference football season =

- Sport: Football
- Teams: 9
- Top draft pick: Bill Daley
- Champion: Ohio State
- Season MVP: Dave Schreiner

Football seasons
- 1941 1943

1942 Big Ten Conference football standings
	Conf.					Overall
Team	W		L		T	W		L		T
No. 1 Ohio State $	5	–	1	–	0	9	–	1	–	0
No. 3 Wisconsin	4	–	1	–	0	8	–	1	–	1
No. 9 Michigan	3	–	2	–	0	7	–	3	–	0
Illinois	3	–	2	–	0	6	–	4	–	0
Iowa	3	–	3	–	0	6	–	4	–	0
No. 19 Minnesota	3	–	3	–	0	5	–	4	–	0
Indiana	2	–	2	–	0	7	–	3	–	0
Purdue	1	–	4	–	0	1	–	8	–	0
Northwestern	0	–	6	–	0	1	–	9	–	0
$ – Conference champion; Rankings from AP Poll

The 1942 Big Ten Conference football season was the 47th season of college football played by the member schools of the Big Ten Conference (also known as the Western Conference) and was a part of the 1942 college football season.

The 1942 Ohio State Buckeyes football team, led by head coach Paul Brown, compiled a 9–1, led the Big Ten in scoring offense (33.7 points per game), won the conference championship, and was ranked No. 1 in the final AP Poll. The Buckeyes' only loss was by a 17–7 score against Wisconsin at Camp Randall Stadium. Tackle Charles Csuri received the team's most valuable player award. Halfback Les Horvath went on to win the 1943 Heisman Trophy.

Wisconsin, under head coach Harry Stuhldreher, compiled an 8–1–1 record, led the conference in scoring defense (6.8 points per game allowed), and was ranked No. 3 in the final AP Poll. The Badgers played Notre Dame to a 7–7 and suffered its sole loss on the road against Iowa. End Dave Schreiner was a consensus first-team All-American and received the Chicago Tribune Silver Football trophy as the most valuable player in the conference. The Helms Athletic Foundation selected Wisconsin as 1942 national champions following the season's bowl games.

Michigan, under head coach Fritz Crisler, compiled a 7–3 record and was ranked No. 9 in the final AP Poll. Two Michigan linemen, tackle Al Wistert and guard Julius Franks (Michigan's first African-American All-American), were selected as consensus first-team All-Americans.

== Season overview ==
=== Results and team statistics ===
Conf. Rank	Team	Head coach	AP final	AP high	Overall record	Conf. record	PPG	PAG	MVP
1	Ohio State	Paul Brown	#1	#1	9–1	5–1	33.7	11.4	Charles Csuri
2	Wisconsin	Harry Stuhldreher	#3	#2	8–1–1	4–1	14.9	6.8	Dave Schreiner
3 (tie)	Michigan	Fritz Crisler	#9	#3	7–3	3–2	22.1	13.4	Al Wistert
3 (tie)	Illinois	Ray Eliot	NR	NR	6–4	3–2	22.7	12.6	Elmer Engel
5 (tie)	Indiana	Bo McMillin	NR	NR	7–3	2–2	25.6	7.9	Lou Saban
5 (tie)	Iowa	Eddie Anderson	NR	#12	6–4	3–3	14.7	13.5	Tom Farmer
5 (tie)	Minnesota	George Hauser	#19	#7	5–4	3–3	16.9	10.1	Dick Wildung
8	Purdue	Elmer Burnham	NR	NR	1–8	1–4	3.0	19.9	Bill Buffington
9	Northwestern	Pappy Waldorf	NR	NR	1–9	0–6	9.6	20.9	Ed Hirsch

Key
PPG = Average of points scored per game
PAG = Average of points allowed per game
MVP = Most valuable player as voted by players on each team as part of the voting process to determine the winner of the Chicago Tribune Silver Football trophy

=== Bowl games ===
During the 1942 season, the Big Ten maintained its long-standing ban on postseason games. Accordingly, no Big Ten teams participated in any bowl games.

== All-Big Ten players ==
The following players were picked by the Associated Press (AP) and/or the United Press (UP) as first-team players on the 1942 All-Big Ten Conference football team.

- Dave Schreiner, end, Wisconsin (AP, UP)
- Bob Shaw, end, Ohio State (AP, UP)
- Dick Wildung, tackle, Minnesota (AP, UP)
- Al Wistert, tackle, Michigan (AP, UP)
- Julius Franks, guard, Michigan (AP, UP)
- Lin Houston, guard, Ohio State (AP, UP)
- Fred Negus, center, Wisconsin (AP, UP)
- George Ceithaml, quarterback, Michigan (AP, UP)
- Billy Hillenbrand, halfback, Indiana (AP, UP)
- Elroy Hirsch, halfback, Wisconsin (AP)
- Paul Sarringhaus, halfback, Ohio State (UP)
- Pat Harder, fullback, Wisconsin (AP, UP)

== All-Americans ==
At the end of the 1942 season, Big Ten players secured five of the 12 consensus first-team picks for the 1942 College Football All-America Team. The Big Ten's consensus All-Americans were:

- Dave Schreiner, end, Wisconsin (AAB, AP, CO, INS, LK, NEA, NW, SN, UP, CP, NYS, WC, MS)
- Dick Wildung, tackle, Minnesota (AAB, AP, CO, LK, NEA, NW, SN, UP, CP, NYS, WC, MS)
- Al Wistert, tackle, Michigan (AAB, LK, NW, UP, NYS, WC, MS)
- Julius Franks, guard, Michigan (CO, INS, NW, CP)
- Billy Hillenbrand, halfback, Indiana (AAB, UP, SN, CP, NEA, CO, NYS, WC)

Other Big Ten players who were named first-team All-Americans by at least one selector were:

- Bob Shaw, end, Ohio State (AP, CP)
- Chuck Csuri, tackle, Ohio State (INS)
- Merv Pregulman, guard, Michigan (NEA, MS)
- Lindell Houston, guard, Ohio State (AAB, CO, NYS, WC)
- Alex Agase, guard, Illinois (LK, UP, SN, MS)
- Bill Daley, halfback, Minnesota (MS)
- Pat Harder, fullback, Wisconsin (AAB, WC, MS)

== 1943 NFL draft ==
The following Big Ten players were selected in the first 10 rounds of the 1943 NFL draft:

Name	Position	Team	Round	Overall pick
Bill Daley	Fullback	Minnesota	1	7
Dick Wildung	Tackle	Minnesota	1	8
Dave Schreiner	End	Wisconsin	2	11
Tom Farmer	Back	Iowa	2	15
George Ceithaml	Back	Michigan	3	19
Al Wistert	Tackle	Michigan	5	32
Les Horvath	Quarterback	Ohio State	6	45
Bill Parker	End	Iowa	8	65
Bob Motl	End	Northwestern	9	80
