= 1942 Michigan Wolverines football team =

American college football season

1942 Michigan Wolverines football
- Conference: Big Ten Conference

Ranking
- AP: No. 9
- Record: 7–3 (3–2 Big Ten)
- Head coach: Fritz Crisler (5th season)
- Offensive scheme: Single-wing
- MVP: Al Wistert
- Captain: George Ceithaml
- Home stadium: Michigan Stadium

1942 Big Ten Conference football standings
	Conf.					Overall
Team	W		L		T	W		L		T
No. 1 Ohio State $	5	–	1	–	0	9	–	1	–	0
No. 3 Wisconsin	4	–	1	–	0	8	–	1	–	1
No. 9 Michigan	3	–	2	–	0	7	–	3	–	0
Illinois	3	–	2	–	0	6	–	4	–	0
Iowa	3	–	3	–	0	6	–	4	–	0
No. 19 Minnesota	3	–	3	–	0	5	–	4	–	0
Indiana	2	–	2	–	0	7	–	3	–	0
Purdue	1	–	4	–	0	1	–	8	–	0
Northwestern	0	–	6	–	0	1	–	9	–	0
$ – Conference champion; Rankings from AP Poll

The 1942 Michigan Wolverines football team represented the University of Michigan in the 1942 Big Ten Conference football season. The 1942 team compiled a record of 7–3 and was ranked No. 9 in the final Associated Press poll. The team's line that included Albert Wistert, Merv Pregulman, Julius Franks (U-M's first African-American All-American), Elmer Madar, Robert Kolesar, Bill Pritula and Philip Sharpe and was known as the "Seven Oak Posts."

== Schedule ==
Date	Opponent	Rank	Site	Result	Attendance
September 26	Great Lakes Navy*		Michigan Stadium; Ann Arbor, MI	W 9–0	17,031
October 3	Michigan State*		Michigan Stadium; Ann Arbor, MI (rivalry)	W 20–0	40,023
October 10	Iowa Pre-Flight*		Michigan Stadium; Ann Arbor, MI	L 14–26	36,839
October 17	Northwestern	No. 3	Michigan Stadium; Ann Arbor, MI (rivalry)	W 34–16	32,188
October 24	at No. 13 Minnesota	No. 4	Memorial Stadium; Minneapolis, MN (Little Brown Jug)	L 14–16	49,181
October 31	No. 12 Illinois^{†}	No. 13	Michigan Stadium; Ann Arbor, MI (rivalry)	W 28–14	33,826
November 7	Harvard*	No. 11	Michigan Stadium; Ann Arbor, MI	W 35–7	25,305
November 14	at No. 4 Notre Dame*	No. 6	Notre Dame Stadium; Notre Dame, IN (rivalry)	W 32–20	54,412
November 21	at No. 5 Ohio State	No. 4	Ohio Stadium; Columbus, OH (rivalry)	L 7–21	71,691
November 28	Iowa	No. 9	Michigan Stadium; Ann Arbor, MI	W 28–14	20,923
*Non-conference game; ^{†}Homecoming; Rankings from AP Poll released prior to the game

== Rankings ==
Ranking movements Legend: ██ Increase in ranking ██ Decrease in ranking ( ) = First-place votes
	Week							
Poll	1	2	3	4	5	6	7	Final
AP	3 (12)	4 (2)	13	11	6	4 (3)	9	9

== Season summary ==
=== Week 1: Great Lakes Navy ===
Week 1: Great Lakes Navy at Michigan

Team	1	2	3	4	Total
Great Lakes Navy	0	0	0	0	0
• Michigan	0	6	3	0	9

- Date: September 26, 1942
- Location: Michigan Stadium
  Ann Arbor, MI
- Game attendance: 17,087

On September 26, 1942, Michigan opened the season against the Great Lakes Navy Bluejackets football team. The Great Lakes team was an all-star team of players serving in the Navy. It included 13 players who had been named All-Americans (Urban Odson and Pete Kmetovic) and some who had been playing in the NFL (Carl Mulleneaux, Rudy Mucha, and Gust Zarnas) before the war. The Ann Arbor News reported that Great Lakes was favored by 35 points. Only 17,087 fans attended the game, making it the smallest crowd at Michigan Stadium since 1931. The game marked the debut of Bob Chappuis, who led the team on a 92-yard touchdown drive in the second quarter. The touchdown came on a pass from Chappuis to Paul White. Michigan added a field goal by Jim Brieske in the third quarter. Michigan shut out the heavily favored Great Lakes team, 9-0.

Michigan's starting lineup against Great Lakes was Madar (left end), Wistert (left tackle), Kolesar (right guard), Pregulman (center), Franks (right guard), Pritula (right tackle), Sharpe (right end), Ceithaml (quarterback), Wise (left halfback), White (right halfback), and Wiese (fullback).

=== Week 2: Michigan State ===
Week 2: Michigan State at Michigan

Team	1	2	3	4	Total
Mich. St.	0	0	0	0	0
• Michigan	0	0	13	7	20

- Date: October 3, 1942
- Location: Michigan Stadium
  Ann Arbor, MI
- Game attendance: 39,163

In the second week of the season, Michigan played Michigan State College. Playing in Ann Arbor in front of 39,163 spectators (the smallest crowd to see a Michigan-Michigan State game since 1935), the Wolverines defeated the Spartans, 20–0. With Don Kuzma injured, Don Robinson got the start at left halfback. Robinson scored the first touchdown for Michigan in the third quarter. Frank Wardley and Warren Yaap also scored touchdowns for Michigan. Jim Briske converted two PATs.

Michigan's starting lineup against Michigan State was Sharpe (left end), Wistert (left tackle), Kolesar (right guard), Pregulman (center), Franks (right guard), Pritula (right tackle), Madar (right end), Ceithaml (quarterback), Robinson (left halfback), White (right halfback), and Wiese (fullback).

=== Week 3: Iowa Pre-Flight ===
Week 3: Iowa Pre-Flight at Michigan

Team	1	2	3	4	Total
• Iowa Pre-Flight	0	13	0	13	26
Michigan	7	7	0	0	14

- Date: October 10, 1942
- Location: Michigan Stadium
  Ann Arbor, MI
- Game attendance: 34,124

In the third week of the season, Michigan played the football team from the U.S. Navy pre-flight school at the University of Iowa. The Iowa Pre-Flight team was coached by Bernie Bierman, who came into the game with a 20-game winning streak, and led by quarterback Forest Evashevski, who had played for Michigan from 1938 to 1940. Playing in Ann Arbor in front of 34,124 spectators, Michigan took a 14-0 lead on touchdown pass from Don Robinson to Bob Wiese and from Elmer Madar to Bob Chappuis. The Iowa pre-flight cadets responded with 26 unanswered points and won the game, 26-14. The game was Bierman's ninth straight victory (including games at Minnesota) over Michigan. Bierman had been responsible for five of Fritz Crisler's losses to that date since he joined Michigan in 1938.

Michigan's starting lineup against the Iowa pre-fight cadets was Sharpe (left end), Wistert (left tackle), Kolesar (right guard), Pregulman (center), Franks (right guard), Pritula (right tackle), Madar (right end), Ceithaml (quarterback), Robinson (left halfback), Warbley (right halfback), and Wiese (fullback).

=== Week 4: Northwestern ===
Week 4: Northwestern at #3 Michigan

Team	1	2	3	4	Total
Northwestern	0	3	0	13	16
• Michigan	7	14	6	7	34

- Date: October 17, 1942
- Location: Michigan Stadium
  Ann Arbor, MI
- Game attendance: 32,815

In the fourth week of the season, Michigan opened its Big Ten Conference schedule with a 34-16 win over Northwestern in Ann Arbor. After missing the first three games, Tom Kuzma returned to the lineup in the game. Kuzma scored a touchdown in the third quarter. Paul White scored twice, and Bob Wiese scored once. Merv Pregulman also scored in the fourth quarter after intercepting an Otto Graham pass and returning it 34 yards for a touchdown. Jim Brieske converted four of five PATs. Northwestern's All-American Otto Graham completed 20 of 29 passes for 295 yards, but Michigan's defense held the Wildcats to only 26 rushing yards.

Michigan's starting lineup against Northwestern was Sharpe (left end), Wistert (left tackle), Kolesar (right guard), Pregulman (center), Franks (right guard), Pritula (right tackle), Madar (right end), Ceithaml (quarterback), Robinson (left halfback), White (right halfback), and Wiese (fullback).

=== Week 5: at Minnesota ===
Week 5: #4 Michigan at #13 Minnesota

Team	1	2	3	4	Total
Michigan	7	0	0	7	14
• Minnesota	0	7	7	7	21

- Date: October 24, 1942
- Location: Memorial Stadium
  Minneapolis, MN
- Game attendance: 55,000

In the fifth week of the season, Michigan traveled to Minneapolis and lost to Minnesota, 14-21. Tom Kuzma ran for touchdowns in the first and fourth quarters, and Jim Brieske converted both PATs. Bill Daley, who would go on to play for Michigan in 1943, ran 44 yards for a tying touchdown in the second quarter.

Michigan's starting lineup against Minnesota was Sharpe (left end), Wistert (left tackle), Kolesar (right guard), Pregulman (center), Franks (right guard), Pritula (right tackle), Madar (right end), Ceithaml (quarterback), Kuzma (left halfback), White (right halfback), and Lund (fullback).

=== Week 6: Illinois ===
Week 6: #12 Illinois at #13 Michigan

Team	1	2	3	4	Total
Illinois	0	7	0	7	14
• Michigan	7	7	7	7	28

- Date: October 31, 1942
- Location: Michigan Stadium
  Ann Arbor, MI
- Game attendance: 33,826

In the sixth week of the season, Michigan defeated Illinois, 28-14, in front of 33,826 fans at Michigan Stadium. Michigan touchdowns were scored by Paul White, Bob Chappuis, Bob Wiese, and Bob Stenberg. Wiese's touchdown came on a 19-yard pass from Tom Kuzma. Jim Brieske converted all four PATs for Michigan.

Michigan's starting lineup against Illinois was Madar (left end), Wistert (left tackle), Kolesar (right guard), Pregulman (center), Franks (right guard), Pritula (right tackle), Sharpe (right end), Ceithaml (quarterback), Kuzma (left halfback), White (right halfback), and Boor (fullback).

=== Week 7: Harvard ===
Week 7: Harvard at #11 Michigan

Team	1	2	3	4	Total
Harvard	0	0	7	0	7
• Michigan	7	21	0	7	35

- Date: November 7, 1942
- Location: Michigan Stadium
  Ann Arbor, MI
- Game attendance: 25,534

In the seventh week of the season, Michigan defeated Harvard, 35-7, in front of 25,534 fans at Michigan Stadium. Right halfback Paul White ran for two touchdowns, and Tom Kuzma ran for another. Elmer Madar also scored on a 53-yard interception return. Michigan's final touchdown came on a 32-yard pass play from Bob Chappuis to White. Stenberg also scored on a touchdown pass from Wiese. Jim Brieske converted all five PATs for Michigan.

Michigan's starting lineup against Harvard was Sharpe (left end), Wistert (left tackle), _____ (right guard), Pregulman (center), Franks (right guard), Pritula (right tackle), Madar (right end), Ceithaml (quarterback), Kuzma (left halfback), White (right halfback), and Wiese (fullback).

=== Week 8: at Notre Dame ===
Week 8: #6 Michigan at #4 Notre Dame

Team	1	2	3	4	Total
• Michigan	7	6	19	0	32
Notre Dame	7	7	0	6	20

- Date: November 14, 1942
- Location: Notre Dame Stadium
  South Bend, IN
- Game attendance: 57,500

In the eighth week of the season, Michigan traveled to Notre Dame and defeated the Fighting Irish, 32-20 in front of a capacity crowd of 57,500. Michigan's total of 32 points was the most scored against Notre Dame since 1905. Michigan's first touchdown came on a quarterback sneak by George Ceithaml from the one-yard line. Robinson ran for Michigan's second touchdown on a fake field goal attempt from the four-yard line. Tom Kuzma scored two touchdowns in the second half.

Michigan's starting lineup against Harvard was Sharpe (left end), Wistert (left tackle), Kolesar (right guard), Pregulman (center), Franks (right guard), Pritula (right tackle), Madar (right end), Ceithaml (quarterback), Kuzma (left halfback), White (right halfback), and Wiese (fullback).

=== Week 9: at Ohio State ===
Week 9: #4 Michigan at #5 Ohio State

Team	1	2	3	4	Total
Michigan	0	0	7	0	7
• Ohio State	0	7	7	7	21

- Date: November 21, 1942
- Location: Ohio Stadium
  Columbus, OH
- Game attendance: 71,896

In the ninth week of the season, Michigan traveled to Columbus and lost to Ohio State, 7-21. With the win, Ohio State won the Big Ten championship. Michigan's only touchdown was scored by Bob Wiese in the third quarter.

Michigan's starting lineup against Ohio State was Sharpe (left end), Wistert (left tackle), Kolesar (right guard), Pregulman (center), Franks (right guard), Pritula (right tackle), Madar (right end), Ceithaml (quarterback), Kuzma (left halfback), White (right halfback), and Wiese (fullback).

=== Week 10: Iowa ===
Week 10: Iowa at #9 Michigan

Team	1	2	3	4	Total
Iowa	0	0	7	7	14
• Michigan	14	0	0	14	28

- Date: November 28, 1942
- Location: Michigan Stadium
  Ann Arbor, MI
- Game attendance: 20,634

Michigan concluded the 1942 season with a 28-14 win over Iowa in Ann Arbor. Michigan touchdowns were scored by Tom Kuzma, Bob Wiese, Paul White, and Charles Kennedy. Jim Brieske converted all four PATs.

Michigan's starting lineup against Iowa was Sharpe (left end), Wistert (left tackle), Kolesar (right guard), Pregulman (center), Franks (right guard), Pritula (right tackle), Madar (right end), Ceithaml (quarterback), Kuzma (left halfback), White (right halfback), and Wiese (fullback).

== Players ==
=== Varsity letter winners ===
- Ralph H. Amstutz - guard
- Donald P. Boor - 1 game at fullback
- Jim Brieske - placekicker
- George Ceithaml - 10 games at quarterback
- Bob Chappuis - 1 game at left halfback
- Robert Derleth - tackle
- Julius Franks - 10 games at right guard
- Walter Freihofer - guard
- Jack Karwales - tackle
- Charles F. Kennedy, Jr. - halfback
- Robert Kolesar - 10 games at left guard
- Tom Kuzma - 5 games at left halfback
- Don Lund - 1 game at fullback
- Elmer Madar - 8 games at right end, 2 games at left end
- Merv Pregulman - 10 games at center
- Bill Pritula - 10 games at right tackle
- Don Robinson - 2 games at left halfback, 1 game at right halfback
- Philip E. Sharpe - 8 games at left end, 2 games at right end
- Rudy Smeja - end
- Robert P. Stenberg - fullback
- Robert W. Vernier - quarterback
- Frank L. Wardley - halfback
- Paul White - 9 games at right halfback, 1 game at left halfback
- Bob Wiese - 8 games at fullback
- Cliff Wise - 1 game at left halfback
- Albert Wistert - 10 games at left tackle

=== Reserves ===
- Charles B. Avery - halfback
- William W. Baldwin - tackle
- Cecil Bovee - end
- Fred J. Bryan - end
- Donald J. Cady - tackle
- Otto E. Chady - end
- Clayton Foor - guard
- Robert J. Gage - tackle
- William Gans - guard
- Paul M. Gardner - center
- Louis Goodman - center
- John J. Greene - tackle
- William J. Grey - end
- Peter Gritis - tackle
- John F. Harrigan - quarterback
- James G. Hartrick - guard
- George H. Hildebrandt - guard
- Paul C. Johnson - tackle
- William C. Keenan - halfback
- George C. Kiesel - quarterback
- William E. Kuyper - tackle
- Philip B. Marcellus -tackle
- Frank C. McCarthy - end
- Robert L. McFaddin - center
- Austin S. Miller - fullback
- Philip K. Mooney - center
- Robert L. Morrison - halfback
- Clifton O. Myll - end
- Robert A. Oren - end
- Milton Pergament - quarterback
- Jack E. Petoskey - end
- William R. Rohrbach - guard
- Jerome K. Schaffer - guard
- Donald C. Schorling - guard
- Vincent C. Secontine - tackle
- Robert W. Shemky - end
- Angelo E. Trogan - guard
- Benjamin A. Ungar - tackle
- John S. Vansummern - end
- Howard L. Wikel - fullback
- Warren E. Yaap - halfback

== Awards and honors ==
- All-Americans: Albert Wistert, Julius Franks
- All-Conference: Albert Wistert, Julius Franks, George Ceithaml
- Most Valuable Player: Albert Wistert
- Meyer Morton Award: Bob Wiese

== Coaching and training staff ==
- Head coach: Fritz Crisler
- Assistant coaches

- Backfield coach: Earl Martineau
- Line coach: Biggie Munn
- Other assistant coaches: Ernest McCoy, Bennie Oosterbaan, Wally Weber

- Trainer: Charles B. Hoyt
- Manager: James D. Kline, Howard DeYoung (assistant), Merritt Bigelow (assistant), Samuel Emmons (assistant), Donald Howell (assistant), Robert Oberfelder (assistant)
