= 1942 Wisconsin Badgers football team =

American college football season

1942 Wisconsin Badgers football

National champion (HAF)
- Conference: Big Ten Conference

Ranking
- AP: No. 3
- Record: 8–1–1 (4–1 Big Ten)
- Head coach: Harry Stuhldreher (7th season)
- MVP: Dave Schreiner
- Captains: Dave Schreiner; Mark Hoskins
- Home stadium: Camp Randall Stadium

1942 Big Ten Conference football standings
	Conf.					Overall
Team	W		L		T	W		L		T
No. 1 Ohio State $	5	–	1	–	0	9	–	1	–	0
No. 3 Wisconsin	4	–	1	–	0	8	–	1	–	1
No. 9 Michigan	3	–	2	–	0	7	–	3	–	0
Illinois	3	–	2	–	0	6	–	4	–	0
Iowa	3	–	3	–	0	6	–	4	–	0
No. 19 Minnesota	3	–	3	–	0	5	–	4	–	0
Indiana	2	–	2	–	0	7	–	3	–	0
Purdue	1	–	4	–	0	1	–	8	–	0
Northwestern	0	–	6	–	0	1	–	9	–	0
$ – Conference champion; Rankings from AP Poll

The 1942 Wisconsin Badgers football team was an American football team that represented the University of Wisconsin in the 1942 Big Ten Conference football season. The team compiled an 8–1–1 record (4–1 against conference opponents), finished in second place in the Big Ten Conference, led the conference in scoring defense (6.8 points allowed per game), and was ranked No. 3 in the final AP Poll. Harry Stuhldreher was in his seventh year as Wisconsin's head coach.

The Helms Athletic Foundation selected Wisconsin as the 1942 national champion at the end of the season, giving the program its only national championship. Ohio State, a team that Wisconsin defeated, was selected as national champion in the AP Poll.

The team played its home games at Camp Randall Stadium. During the 1942 season, the average attendance at home games was 29,026.

== Schedule ==
Date	Opponent	Rank	Site	Result	Attendance	Source
September 19	Camp Grant*		Camp Randall Stadium; Madison, WI	W 7–0		
September 26	Notre Dame*		Camp Randall Stadium; Madison, WI	T 7–7	23,243	
October 3	Marquette*		Camp Randall Stadium; Madison, WI	W 35–7	35,000	
October 10	Missouri*		Camp Randall Stadium; Madison, WI	W 17–9		
October 17	at Great Lakes Navy*	No. 7	Soldier Field; Chicago, IL	W 13–7	30,000	
October 24	at Purdue	No. 7	Ross–Ade Stadium; West Lafayette, IN	W 13–0	20,000	
October 31	No. 1 Ohio State^{†}	No. 6	Camp Randall Stadium; Madison, WI	W 17–7	45,000	
November 7	at Iowa	No. 2	Iowa Stadium; Iowa City, IA (rivalry)	L 0–6		
November 14	at Northwestern	No. 7	Dyche Stadium; Evanston, IL	W 20–19		
November 21	No. 10 Minnesota	No. 7	Camp Randall Stadium; Madison, WI (rivalry)	W 20–6	46,000	
*Non-conference game; ^{†}Homecoming; Rankings from AP Poll released prior to the game; Source:

== Rankings ==
Ranking movements Legend: ██ Increase in ranking ██ Decrease in ranking ( ) = First-place votes
	Week							
Poll	1	2	3	4	5	6	7	Final
AP	7	7 (2)	6 (1)	2 (20.33)	7	7	4 (2)	3 (4)

== Awards and honors ==
End Dave Schreiner received the Chicago Tribune Silver Football as the Big Ten's most valuable player. Schreiner was also selected as a unanimous first-team player on the 1942 College Football All-America Team. Schreiner and tackle Bob Baumann joined the United States Marine Corps and were killed in action during the Battle of Okinawa in June 1945.

Journalist and author Terry Frei, the son of Wisconsin guard and decorated P-38 pilot Jerry Frei, wrote a critically acclaimed 2007 book, Third Down and a War to Go, about the '42 Badgers and the team's virtually universal heroism in World War II in both theaters.

In addition to Schreiner, other Wisconsin players receiving All-America or All-Big Ten honors in 1942 were:

- Fullback Pat Harder was selected as a first-team All-American by the All-America Board and the Walter Camp Football Foundation. Harder was also selected by the Associated Press (AP) and United Press (UP) as a first-team player on the 1942 All-Big Ten Conference football team.
- Center Fred Negus was selected by the AP and UP as a first-team All-Big Ten player.
- Halfback Elroy "Crazylegs" Hirsch was selected by the AP as a first-team All-Big Ten player.
- Tackle Paul Hirsbrunner was selected by the UP as a second-team All-Big Ten player.

Three players from the 1942 Wisconsin team have been inducted into the College Football Hall of Fame: Dave Schreiner in 1955; Elroy Hirsch in 1974; and Pat Harder in 1993.

Dave Schreiner received the team's most valuable player award. Schreiner and Mark Hoskins were the team captains.
