= 1942 Illinois Fighting Illini football team =

American college football season

1942 Illinois Fighting Illini football
- Conference: Big Ten Conference
- Record: 6–4 (3–2 Big Ten)
- Head coach: Ray Eliot (1st season)
- MVP: Elmer Engel
- Captain: Jimmy Smith
- Home stadium: Memorial Stadium

1942 Big Ten Conference football standings
	Conf.					Overall
Team	W		L		T	W		L		T
No. 1 Ohio State $	5	–	1	–	0	9	–	1	–	0
No. 3 Wisconsin	4	–	1	–	0	8	–	1	–	1
No. 9 Michigan	3	–	2	–	0	7	–	3	–	0
Illinois	3	–	2	–	0	6	–	4	–	0
Iowa	3	–	3	–	0	6	–	4	–	0
No. 19 Minnesota	3	–	3	–	0	5	–	4	–	0
Indiana	2	–	2	–	0	7	–	3	–	0
Purdue	1	–	4	–	0	1	–	8	–	0
Northwestern	0	–	6	–	0	1	–	9	–	0
$ – Conference champion; Rankings from AP Poll

The 1942 Illinois Fighting Illini football team was an American football team that represented the University of Illinois during the 1942 Big Ten Conference football season. In their first season under head coach Ray Eliot, the Illini compiled a 6–4 record and finished in a tie for third place in the Big Ten Conference. Illinois was ranked at No. 11 (out of 590 college and military teams) in the final rankings under the Litkenhous Difference by Score System for 1942.

End Elmer Engel was selected as the team's most valuable player. Guard Alex Agase received second-team honorshonors from the United Press on the 1942 All-Big Ten Conference football team.

The team played its home games at Memorial Stadium in Champaign, Illinois.

== Schedule ==
Date	Opponent	Rank	Site	Result	Attendance	Source
September 26	South Dakota*		Memorial Stadium; Champaign, IL	W 46–0	7,500	
October 3	Butler*		Memorial Stadium; Champaign, IL	W 67–0	10,000	
October 10	Minnesota		Memorial Stadium; Champaign, IL	W 20–13	24,276	
October 17	at No. 19 Iowa	No. 5	Iowa Stadium; Iowa City, IA	W 12–7	25,600	
October 24	No. 8 Notre Dame*	No. 5	Memorial Stadium; Champaign, IL	L 14–21	43,476	
October 31	at No. 13 Michigan	No. 12	Michigan Stadium; Ann Arbor, MI (rivalry)	L 14–28	33,826	
November 7	at Northwestern	No. 20	Dyche Stadium; Evanston, IL (rivalry)	W 14–7	35,300	
November 14	vs. No. 10 Ohio State	No. 13	Cleveland Stadium; Cleveland, OH (Illibuck)	L 20–44	68,586	
November 21	Great Lakes Navy*		Memorial Stadium; Champaign, IL	L 0–6	10,856	
November 28	at Camp Grant*		Camp Grant; Rockford, IL	W 20–0	5,000	
*Non-conference game; Rankings from AP Poll released prior to the game

== Rankings ==
Ranking movements Legend: ██ Increase in ranking ██ Decrease in ranking — = Not ranked ( ) = First-place votes
	Week							
Poll	1	2	3	4	5	6	7	Final
AP	5 (18)	5 (1)	12	20	13	—	—	—
