= 1942 Iowa Hawkeyes football team =

American college football season

1942 Iowa Hawkeyes football
- Conference: Big Ten Conference
- Record: 6–4 (3–3 Big Ten)
- Head coach: Eddie Anderson (4th season)
- MVP: Tom Farmer
- Home stadium: Iowa Stadium

1942 Big Ten Conference football standings
	Conf.					Overall
Team	W		L		T	W		L		T
No. 1 Ohio State $	5	–	1	–	0	9	–	1	–	0
No. 3 Wisconsin	4	–	1	–	0	8	–	1	–	1
No. 9 Michigan	3	–	2	–	0	7	–	3	–	0
Illinois	3	–	2	–	0	6	–	4	–	0
Iowa	3	–	3	–	0	6	–	4	–	0
No. 19 Minnesota	3	–	3	–	0	5	–	4	–	0
Indiana	2	–	2	–	0	7	–	3	–	0
Purdue	1	–	4	–	0	1	–	8	–	0
Northwestern	0	–	6	–	0	1	–	9	–	0
$ – Conference champion; Rankings from AP Poll

The 1942 Iowa Hawkeyes football team was an American football team that represented the University of Iowa as a member of the Big Ten Conference during the 1942 Big Ten football season. In their fourth year under head coach Eddie Anderson, the Hawkeyes compiled a 6–4 record (3–3 in conference games), tied for fifth place in the Big Ten, and outscored opponents by a total of 147 to 135. This was Anderson's last season during his first stint as head coach for the Hawkeyes, as he left the program for military service during World War II. Iowa was ranked at No. 26 (out of 590 college and military teams) in the final rankings under the Litkenhous Ratings released in December 1942.

The team played its home games at Iowa Stadium (later renamed Kinnick Stadium) in Iowa City, Iowa.

== Schedule ==
Date	Opponent	Rank	Site	Result	Attendance	Source
September 19	Washington University*		Iowa Stadium; Iowa City, IA	W 26–7	8,200–10,000	
September 26	Nebraska*		Iowa Stadium; Iowa City, IA (rivalry)	W 27–0		
October 3	Great Lakes Navy*		Iowa Stadium; Iowa City, IA	L 0–25	8,600	
October 10	Camp Grant*		Iowa Stadium; Iowa City, IA	W 33–16	9,100	
October 17	No. 5 Illinois	No. 19	Iowa Stadium; Iowa City, IA	L 7–12	25,600	
October 24	at Indiana		Memorial Stadium; Bloomington, IA	W 14–13		
October 31	Purdue		Iowa Stadium; Iowa City, IA	W 13–7		
November 7	No. 2 Wisconsin^{†}		Iowa Stadium; Iowa City, IA (rivalry)	W 6–0		
November 14	at No. 16 Minnesota	No. 12	Memorial Stadium; Minneapolis, MN (rivalry)	L 7–27	33,000	
November 28	at No. 9 Michigan		Michigan Stadium; Ann Arbor, MI	L 14–28	20,923	
*Non-conference game; ^{†}Homecoming; Rankings from AP Poll released prior to the game

== Rankings ==
Ranking movements Legend: ██ Increase in ranking ██ Decrease in ranking — = Not ranked
	Week							
Poll	1	2	3	4	5	6	7	Final
AP	19	—	—	—	12	—	—	—
