= 1942 Purdue Boilermakers football team =

American college football season

1942 Purdue Boilermakers football
- Conference: Big Ten Conference
- Record: 1–8 (1–4 Big Ten)
- Head coach: Elmer Burnham (1st season)
- MVP: Bill Buffington
- Captain: Bill Buffington
- Home stadium: Ross–Ade Stadium

1942 Big Ten Conference football standings
	Conf.					Overall
Team	W		L		T	W		L		T
No. 1 Ohio State $	5	–	1	–	0	9	–	1	–	0
No. 3 Wisconsin	4	–	1	–	0	8	–	1	–	1
No. 9 Michigan	3	–	2	–	0	7	–	3	–	0
Illinois	3	–	2	–	0	6	–	4	–	0
Iowa	3	–	3	–	0	6	–	4	–	0
No. 19 Minnesota	3	–	3	–	0	5	–	4	–	0
Indiana	2	–	2	–	0	7	–	3	–	0
Purdue	1	–	4	–	0	1	–	8	–	0
Northwestern	0	–	6	–	0	1	–	9	–	0
$ – Conference champion; Rankings from AP Poll

The 1942 Purdue Boilermakers football team was an American football team that represented Purdue University during the 1942 Big Ten Conference football season. In their first season under head coach Elmer Burnham, the Boilermakers compiled a 1–8 record, finished in eighth place in the Big Ten Conference with a 1–4 record against conference opponents, and were outscored by their opponents by a total of 179 to 27.

Purdue was ranked at No. 74 (out of 590 college and military teams) in the final rankings under the Litkenhous Difference by Score System for 1942.

== Schedule ==
Date	Opponent	Site	Result	Attendance	Source
September 26	Fordham*	Ross–Ade Stadium; West Lafayette, IN	L 7–14	20,000	
October 3	at Vanderbilt*	Dudley Field; Nashville, TN	L 0–26	18,000	
October 10	at Northwestern	Dyche Stadium; Evanston, IL	W 7–6	33,000	
October 17	at No. 1 Ohio State	Ohio Stadium; Columbus, OH	L 0–26	45,943	
October 24	No. 7 Wisconsin^{†}	Ross–Ade Stadium; West Lafayette, IN	L 0–13	20,000	
October 31	at Iowa	Iowa Stadium; Iowa City, IA	L 7–13		
November 7	Great Lakes Navy*	Ross–Ade Stadium; West Lafayette, IN	L 0–42	12,000	
November 14	at Michigan State*	Macklin Field; East Lansing, MI	L 6–19	7,500	
November 21	No. 18 Indiana	Ross–Ade Stadium; West Lafayette, IN (Old Oaken Bucket)	L 0–20	20,000	
*Non-conference game; ^{†}Homecoming; Rankings from AP Poll released prior to the game

== Roster ==
- John Andretich, HB
- Bob Bachmann, C
- Dick Barwegen, G
- Andy Berkley, HB
- Anthony Berto, HB
- Mel Brown, E
- Bill Buffington, FB
- Jim Comer, HB
- Walter Cook, HB
- E. J. Cyceneas, HB
- Harry Dameron, E
- Pete DeMaria, G
- Vernon Erk, E
- Frank Foughty, E
- Barry French, T
- Bob Hajzy, QB
- Fred Halpin, E
- Charles Harris, E
- O. L. Hurrle, G
- Joe Johnston, HB
- LaVern King, E
- Edward Klein
- Carl Leevy
- Alex Leugo, C
- Cook Lougheed, G
- E. E. Matrewitz, T
- Forrest McCaffry, E
- Ewell O'Bryan, T
- Mike Popovich, FB
- William Powers, G
- Bob Rickbell, G
- Frank Ruggieri, G
- Bill Shimer, E
- Fred Smerke, QB-E
- Kenneth Smock, HB
- V. A. Snyder, FB
- Raymond Stoelting, T
- Hank Stram, FB-HB
- Bruce Warren, T
- Richard Wiley
- Joe Winkler, C
