= Dick Wildung =

American football player (1921–2006)

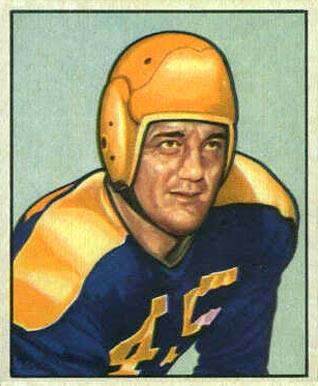
- Wildung on a 1950 Bowman football card

No. 45, 70
- Positions: Tackle, guard

Personal information
- Born: August 16, 1921; Scotland, South Dakota, U.S.
- Died: March 15, 2006 (aged 84); Minneapolis, Minnesota, U.S.
- Listed height: 6 ft 0 in (1.83 m)
- Listed weight: 221 lb (100 kg)

Career information
- High school: Luverne (MN)
- College: Minnesota (1939–1942)
- NFL draft: 1943: 1st round, 8th overall pick

Career history
- Green Bay Packers (1946–1951, 1953)

Awards and highlights
- Second-team All-Pro (1947, 1949); Pro Bowl (1951); Green Bay Packers Hall of Fame; 2× National champion (1940, 1941); 2× Consensus All-American (1941, 1942); 2× First-team All-Big Ten (1941, 1942)

Career NFL statistics
- Games played: 83
- Games started: 73
- Fumble recoveries: 11
- Stats at Pro Football Reference
- College Football Hall of Fame

Richard Kay Wildung (August 16, 1921 – March 15, 2006) was an American professional football player who was a tackle for the Green Bay Packers in the National Football League (NFL). He played college football for the Minnesota Golden Gophers (1940–1942). Wildung played for back-to-back national championship teams at Minnesota and was a consensus All-American in 1941 and 1942. He was inducted into the College Football Hall of Fame in 1957 and Green Bay Packers Hall of Fame in 1973.

== Early life ==
Wildung was born in Scotland, South Dakota, in 1921. He grew up and graduated from high school in Luverne, Minnesota. Wildung's father died when Wildung was a boy, and his mother ran a dress shop in Luverne.

Wildung starred in both football and basketball and was also second academically in his class in high school.

== Minnesota ==
Wildung enrolled at the University of Minnesota in 1939 and played that fall for the freshman football team. As a sophomore in 1940, he became a starter from the first game. He was a starter at tackle position, both on offense and defense, for the undefeated 1940 Minnesota Golden Gophers football team that was ranked No. 1 in the final AP poll. While at Minnesota Wildung was a member of Phi Delta Theta fraternity.

The 1941 Minnesota team repeated as national champion, and Wildung was one of the returning players who played for back-to-back national champions. Minnesota coach Bernie Bierman called Wildung "as good a tackle as I ever have coached." The Associated Press wrote that he had "a solid frame and a terrific charge" and "an ability to sense the opponents' plays almost before they are executed." George A. Barton of The Minneapolis Tribune described him as "remarkably fast and active" who was able not only to open "gaping holes" in the line but also to lead plays down the field, clearing the way with "brutal downfield blocking". He was also an "iron man" player who played on defense as well, including all 60 minutes of Minnesota's 1941 victories over Washington, Michigan, Northwestern, Nebraska, and Iowa.

Wildung was a consensus pick at tackle on the 1941 All-America college football team. He received first-team honors from ten All-America selectors, including the All-America Board, Associated Press, United Press, International News Service, Collier's Weekly Life magazine, and The Sporting News. In announcing Wildung's selection as an All-American, Associated Press sports editor Dillon Graham wrote:

It was Minnesota's powerful line, plus [Bruce] Smith, that carried the Gophers to a perfect record and the No. 1 man on that forewall was Wildung. . . . Wildung often blocked two rivals on the same play. He was so tough that some teams finally stopped trying to get yardage through his slot. Iowa, for instance, didn't run a single play at him.

At the end of the 1941 season, Wildung was also chosen by his teammates as captain of the 1942 Minnesota football team. The 1942 compiled a 5–4 record and was ranked No. 19 in the final AP poll. Wildung was selected as the team's most valuable player. He also repeated as a consensus pick for the 1942 All-America team.

== Military service ==
Wildung served in the United States Navy during World War II. He was commissioned at the midshipman's school in Chicago in December 1943. He was also married on New Year's Day 1944 to Margaret Jane Jaehning. As of February 1944, Wildung was assigned as an ordnance teacher at a Chicago naval school. He also served aboard a ship in the southwest Pacific. He also served in a PT boat squadron and won a battle star in the Philippines. He was discharged from the Navy in May 1946.

== Green Bay ==
Wildung was selected eighth overall in the first round of the 1943 NFL draft by the Green Bay Packers, but his pro football debut was delayed until his discharge from the Navy. He was one of several players, along with Bruce Smith, Ray Frankowski, Urban Odson, and Merv Pregulman, who served in the military before resuming their football careers with the Packers.

Wildung signed a contract with the Packers in May 1946. He was the Packers' starting left guard in 1946 and 1947 and the starting left tackle from 1948 to 1951 and in 1953. He appeared in a total of 81 NFL games, 73 of them as a starter. He was selected as an All-NFL player in 1947 and 1949 and played in the Pro Bowl following the 1951 season. He was described as a "tough-as-nails tackle" who missed only two games in seven seasons" and played on both offense and defense at a time when "two-way linemen ... were becoming a dying breed."

Wildung played for the Packers during a period of decline, compiling records of 2–10 in 1949 and 3–9 in 1948, 1950, and 1951. He later recalled that coach Curly Lambeau was out of touch with the direction of pro football: "The game kind of passed Curly by."

Wildung missed the 1952 season. During the off-season, he ran a hardware, appliance, and plumbing business in Redwood Falls, Minnesota, in partnership with his brother-in-law. His brother-in-law died in July 1952. Wildung was unable to find a manager and remained in Redwood Falls to manage the business.

Wildung announced his retirement from football in July 1954, indicating his intention to work full time at his hardware store in Redwood Falls, Minnesota.

== Later life ==
After retiring from football, Wildung led a "humble" life operating a hardware store. In 1957, Wildung was inducted into the College Football Hall of Fame. In 1973 he was inducted into the Green Bay Packers Hall of Fame.
