= 1942 Northwestern Wildcats football team =

American college football season

1942 Northwestern Wildcats football
- Conference: Big Ten Conference
- Record: 1–9 (0–6 Big Ten)
- Head coach: Pappy Waldorf (8th season)
- Offensive scheme: Single-wing
- MVP: Ed Hirsch
- Captain: Nick Burke
- Home stadium: Dyche Stadium

1942 Big Ten Conference football standings
| | Conf. | | | | | Overall |
| Team | W | | L | | T | W | | L | | T |
|---|---|---|---|---|---|---|---|---|---|---|
| No. 1 Ohio State $ | 5 | – | 1 | – | 0 | 9 | – | 1 | – | 0 |
| No. 3 Wisconsin | 4 | – | 1 | – | 0 | 8 | – | 1 | – | 1 |
| No. 9 Michigan | 3 | – | 2 | – | 0 | 7 | – | 3 | – | 0 |
| Illinois | 3 | – | 2 | – | 0 | 6 | – | 4 | – | 0 |
| Iowa | 3 | – | 3 | – | 0 | 6 | – | 4 | – | 0 |
| No. 19 Minnesota | 3 | – | 3 | – | 0 | 5 | – | 4 | – | 0 |
| Indiana | 2 | – | 2 | – | 0 | 7 | – | 3 | – | 0 |
| Purdue | 1 | – | 4 | – | 0 | 1 | – | 8 | – | 0 |
| Northwestern | 0 | – | 6 | – | 0 | 1 | – | 9 | – | 0 |
$ – Conference champion; Rankings from AP Poll

The 1942 Northwestern Wildcats team represented Northwestern University during the 1942 Big Ten Conference football season. In their eighth year under head coach Pappy Waldorf, the Wildcats compiled a 1–9 record (0–6 against Big Ten Conference opponents) and finished in last place in the Big Ten Conference.

Quarterback Otto Graham was selected by both the Associated Press and United Press as a second-team All-Big Ten player. He was also selected as a third-team All-American by The Sporting News and the Central Press.

Northwestern was ranked at No. 35 (out of 590 college and military teams) in the final rankings under the Litkenhous Difference by Score System for 1942.

== Schedule ==
| Date | Opponent | Site | Result | Attendance | Source |
|---|---|---|---|---|---|
| September 26 | Iowa Pre-Flight* | Dyche Stadium; Evanston, IL | L 12–20 | 20,000 | |
| October 3 | Texas* | Dyche Stadium; Evanston, IL | W 3–0 | 43,000 | |
| October 10 | Purdue | Dyche Stadium; Evanston, IL | L 6–7 | 33,000 | |
| October 17 | at No. 3 Michigan | Michigan Stadium; Ann Arbor, MI (rivalry) | L 16–34 | 32,188 | |
| October 24 | No. 1 Ohio State | Dyche Stadium; Evanston, IL | L 6–20 | 40,000 | |
| October 31 | at No. 10 Minnesota | Memorial Stadium; Minneapolis, MN | L 7–19 | 37,000 | |
| November 7 | No. 20 Illinois | Dyche Stadium; Evanston, IL (rivalry) | L 7–14 | 35,300 | |
| November 14 | No. 7 Wisconsin | Dyche Stadium; Evanston, IL | L 19–20 | | |
| November 21 | at No. 8 Notre Dame* | Notre Dame Stadium; Notre Dame, IN (rivalry) | L 20–27 | 26,098 | |
| November 26 | Great Lakes Navy* | Dyche Stadium; Evanston, IL | L 0–48 | 18,500 | |
*Non-conference game; Rankings from AP Poll released prior to the game
