= 1942 Ohio State Buckeyes football team =

American college football season

1942 Ohio State Buckeyes football
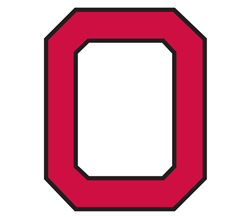

AP Poll national champion Big Ten champion
- Conference: Big Ten Conference

Ranking
- AP: No. 1
- Record: 9–1 (5–1 Big Ten)
- Head coach: Paul Brown (2nd season)
- Offensive scheme: Heavy run
- Base defense: Multiple
- MVP: Jack Graf
- Home stadium: Ohio Stadium

1942 Big Ten Conference football standings
	Conf.					Overall
Team	W		L		T	W		L		T
No. 1 Ohio State $	5	–	1	–	0	9	–	1	–	0
No. 3 Wisconsin	4	–	1	–	0	8	–	1	–	1
No. 9 Michigan	3	–	2	–	0	7	–	3	–	0
Illinois	3	–	2	–	0	6	–	4	–	0
Iowa	3	–	3	–	0	6	–	4	–	0
No. 19 Minnesota	3	–	3	–	0	5	–	4	–	0
Indiana	2	–	2	–	0	7	–	3	–	0
Purdue	1	–	4	–	0	1	–	8	–	0
Northwestern	0	–	6	–	0	1	–	9	–	0
$ – Conference champion; Rankings from AP Poll

The 1942 Ohio State Buckeyes football team was an American football team that represented Ohio State University in the Big Ten Conference during the 1942 season. In their second season under head coach Paul Brown, the Buckeyes compiled a 9–1 record, outscored opponents by a total of 337 to 114, won the Big Ten championship, and was ranked No. 1 in the final AP poll, thus earning Ohio State their first ever national championship in program history.

The team was led by wingback Les Horvath, quarterback and team captain George Lynn, and halfback Gene Fekete. Fekete led the Big 10 with 910 rushing yards.

The Buckeyes' only loss was to No. 3 Wisconsin. Half of the Buckeye players contracted an intestinal disorder after drinking from an unsanitary drinking fountain on the train to Madison. Horvath then led the Buckeyes to three scores through the air to upset Michigan.

== Schedule ==
Date	Opponent	Rank	Site	Result	Attendance	Source
September 26	Fort Knox*		Ohio Stadium; Columbus, OH	W 59–0	22,555	
October 3	Indiana		Ohio Stadium; Columbus, OH	W 32–21	48,227	
October 10	USC*		Ohio Stadium; Columbus, OH	W 28–12	56,436	
October 17	Purdue	No. 1	Ohio Stadium; Columbus, OH	W 26–0	45,943	
October 24	at Northwestern	No. 1	Dyche Stadium; Evanston, IL	W 20–6	40,000	
October 31	at No. 6 Wisconsin	No. 1	Camp Randall Stadium; Madison, WI	L 7–17	45,000	
November 7	Pittsburgh*	No. 6	Ohio Stadium; Columbus, OH	W 59–19	34,893	
November 14	vs. No. 13 Illinois	No. 10	Cleveland Stadium; Cleveland, OH (Illibuck)	W 44–20	68,586	
November 21	No. 4 Michigan	No. 5	Ohio Stadium; Columbus, OH (rivalry)	W 21–7	71,691	
November 28	Iowa Pre-Flight*	No. 3	Ohio Stadium; Columbus, OH	W 41–12	27,259	
*Non-conference game; Rankings from AP Poll released prior to the game

== Rankings ==
Ranking movements Legend: ██ Increase in ranking ██ Decrease in ranking ( ) = First-place votes
	Week							
Poll	1	2	3	4	5	6	7	Final
AP	2 (12)	1 (58)	1 (80)	6	10 (1)	5 (1)	3 (16)	1 (84)

== Coaching staff ==
- Paul Brown, head coach, second year

== Awards ==
=== All-Americans ===
- Charles Csuri, T (Team MVP)
- Gene Fekete, FB
- Lindell Houston, G
- Paul Sarringhaus, HB
- Bob Shaw, E

=== All-Big Ten ===
- Lindell Houston, G
- Paul Sarringhaus, HB
- Bob Shaw, E

=== Big Ten Scholar/Athlete ===
- Don Steinberg, WR

== 1943 NFL draftees ==
Player	Round	Pick	Position	NFL club
Les Horvath	6	45	Halfback	Cleveland Rams
Bill Vickroy	12	105	Center	Cleveland Rams
Don McCafferty	13	116	End	New York Giants
