= 1942 Indiana Hoosiers football team =

American college football season

1942 Indiana Hoosiers football
- Conference: Big Ten Conference
- Record: 7–3 (2–2 Big Ten)
- Head coach: Bo McMillin (9th season)
- MVP: Lou Saban
- Captain: Bob White
- Home stadium: Memorial Stadium

1942 Big Ten Conference football standings
	Conf.					Overall
Team	W		L		T	W		L		T
No. 1 Ohio State $	5	–	1	–	0	9	–	1	–	0
No. 3 Wisconsin	4	–	1	–	0	8	–	1	–	1
No. 9 Michigan	3	–	2	–	0	7	–	3	–	0
Illinois	3	–	2	–	0	6	–	4	–	0
Iowa	3	–	3	–	0	6	–	4	–	0
No. 19 Minnesota	3	–	3	–	0	5	–	4	–	0
Indiana	2	–	2	–	0	7	–	3	–	0
Purdue	1	–	4	–	0	1	–	8	–	0
Northwestern	0	–	6	–	0	1	–	9	–	0
$ – Conference champion; Rankings from AP Poll

The 1942 Indiana Hoosiers football team represented the Indiana Hoosiers in the 1942 Big Ten Conference football season. The Hoosiers played their home games at Memorial Stadium in Bloomington, Indiana. The team was coached by Bo McMillin, in his ninth year as head coach of the Hoosiers.

Indiana was ranked at No. 18 (out of 590 college and military teams) in the final rankings under the Litkenhous Difference by Score System for 1942.

== Schedule ==
Date	Opponent	Rank	Site	Result	Attendance	Source
September 26	Butler*		Memorial Stadium; Bloomington, IN	W 53–0		
October 3	at Ohio State		Ohio Stadium; Columbus, OH	L 21–32	48,227	
October 10	at Nebraska*		Memorial Stadium; Lincoln, NE	W 12–0	24,000	
October 17	at Pittsburgh*		Pitt Stadium; Pittsburgh, PA	W 19–7	20,000	
October 24	Iowa		Memorial Stadium; Bloomington, IN	L 13–14		
October 31	Iowa Pre-Flight*		Memorial Stadium; Bloomington, IN	L 6–26	8,000	
November 7	at No. 7 Minnesota		Memorial Stadium; Minneapolis, MN	W 7–0	32,000	
November 14	Kansas State*		Memorial Stadium; Bloomington, IN	W 54–0	7,500	
November 21	at Purdue	No. 18	Ross–Ade Stadium; West Lafayette, IN (Old Oaken Bucket)	W 20–0	20,000	
November 28	vs. Fort Knox*		Louisville, KY	W 51–0		
*Non-conference game; Rankings from AP Poll released prior to the game

== Rankings ==
Ranking movements Legend: ██ Increase in ranking ██ Decrease in ranking — = Not ranked т = Tied with team above or below
	Week							
Poll	1	2	3	4	5	6	7	Final
AP	—	—	—	—	—	18т	—	—

== 1943 NFL draftees ==
Player	Position	Round	Pick	NFL team
Earl Doloway	Back	15	133	Chicago Cardinals
