= Gene Fekete =

American football player (1922–2011)

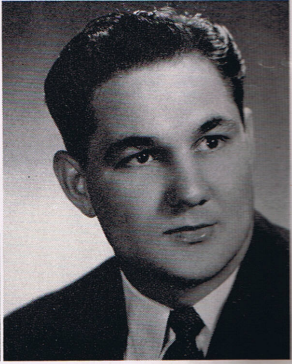
- Fekete, c. 1958

No. 44, 70
- Positions: Fullback, linebacker

Personal information
- Born: August 31, 1922; Sugarcreek, Ohio, U.S.
- Died: April 28, 2011 (aged 88); Columbus, Ohio, U.S.
- Listed height: 6 ft 0 in (1.83 m)
- Listed weight: 195 lb (88 kg)

Career information
- High school: Findlay (Findlay, Ohio)
- College: Ohio State
- NFL draft: 1945: 6th round, 49th overall pick

Career history
- Cleveland Browns (1946)

Awards and highlights
- AAFC champion (1946); National champion (1942); Third-team All-American (1942); Second-team All-Big Ten (1942)

Career NFL statistics
- Rushing yards: 106
- Rushing average: 4.1
- Receptions: 1
- Receiving yards: 2
- Total touchdowns: 1
- Stats at Pro Football Reference

Eugene H. Fekete (August 31, 1922 – April 28, 2011) was an American professional football fullback and linebacker who played for the Cleveland Browns for one season in the All-America Football Conference (AAFC) before launching a coaching and education career.

Fekete was from Findlay, Ohio, where he starred on several high school sports teams. He graduated and enrolled at Ohio State University in 1941. At Ohio State, he was part of a football team that won the school's first national championship in 1942. After serving in the U.S. Army for several years during World War II, Fekete returned to Ohio State to finish his education and played one year for the Browns, a new professional football team in the AAFC.

His career cut short by a bad knee, Fekete went on to serve as an assistant football coach at Ohio State for 10 years. He then got a degree in educational administration and was the principal of two high schools and two middle schools in Columbus, Ohio before he retired in 1975. He was inducted into Ohio State's Varsity "O" Hall of Fame in 1998. Fekete died in 2011.

== Early life ==
Fekete was born to Hungarian immigrants who settled in Findlay, Ohio in the early 1900s. Like his brothers John and Frank, he played on the Findlay High School basketball, track and football teams. A standout athlete, he was recruited by several big-name college football programs, including Michigan State University, Notre Dame University and Ohio State University. He accepted Ohio State's offer.

== College and military career ==
Fekete played on Ohio State's freshman team in 1941, and moved to the varsity team under coach Paul Brown the following year. As a sophomore in 1942, Fekete scored two touchdowns in the team's first regular-season game, a 59–0 win over a Fort Knox military team. He scored another pair of touchdowns in Ohio State's second game, a 32–21 win over Indiana University. In a game against the University of Pittsburgh, he set an Ohio State record for the longest run from scrimmage, an 89-yard dash to the end zone. The record still stands. While Fekete's run was not recorded as a touchdown in Ohio State's record-books, a YouTube video shows him running into the end zone.

Fekete led the Big Ten Conference in scoring and rushing in 1942 as Ohio State amassed a 9–1 record and won its first-ever national title. Fekete was selected as a third-team All-American and was on the second-team of United Press's all-Big-Ten team. Fekete also was eighth in the Heisman Trophy voting, making him the first Ohio State player to finish in the top ten.

Fekete joined the U.S. Army in 1943 and was sent to Fort Bragg in North Carolina. After a stint at the Pratt Institute in Brooklyn, New York to train as an engineer, he was sent to a recruitment center in Manhattan as an assistant psychologist. Fekete competed in the annual College All-Star Game in 1944 despite not having played football or exercised regularly for a year. He was out of shape and reported late to practice because the army initially denied his request to participate. On a handoff from quarterback Otto Graham in the team's first practice, he snapped ligaments in his left knee. After his discharge from the military, Fekete returned to Ohio State to finish out a master's degree in physical education. His thesis was a manual for the U.S. Air Force's conditioning program.

== Professional career ==
After about a year of recuperation, Fekete's knee was strong enough for him to play football again. He was selected 49th overall by the Detroit Lions in the sixth round of the 1945 NFL draft. He signed instead with the Cleveland Browns, a team set to start play in the new All-America Football Conference (AAFC) in 1946. The Browns were coached by Paul Brown, his old coach at Ohio State.

During the 1946 season, Fekete shared time at fullback with Marion Motley. His knee injury flared up again, however, and it became clear that it could not sustain the hard knocks of a professional football season. He ended his playing career and got married after the Browns won the AAFC championship in 1946, for which Fekete received an $833 bonus.

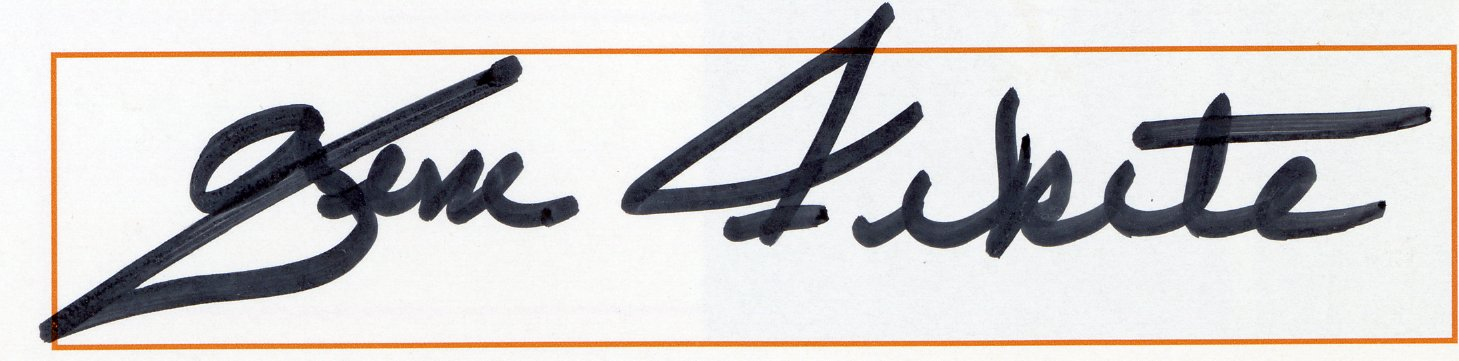

== Coaching and education career ==
in 1948, Fekete accepted a job as head basketball coach, backfield coach for the football team, and physical education teacher at Northern Illinois State Teachers College—now known as Northern Illinois University. After a year in that job, he returned to Ohio State as an assistant coach under Wes Fesler in 1949. Woody Hayes took over as Ohio State's head coach in 1951, and Fekete remained on the staff until 1958. He coached running backs including Heisman Trophy winners Vic Janowicz and Howard "Hopalong" Cassady. Ohio State won two national championships while Fekete was with the team, in 1954 and 1957.

Frustrated at not getting a head coaching job in the college ranks and wanting to spend more time with his family and two sons, Fekete left his Ohio State coaching job. He tried the insurance business, then became the coach of the Columbus team in the new United Football League, in 1961, but resigned the following year. He spent four years as a world history teacher and football coach at West High School in Columbus, Ohio. The 1965 Occident Yearbook p. 88 states that Fekete "left after the first semester to become a cadet principal". He then moved on to North High School in Columbus as an assistant principal, followed by Franklin and Starling middle schools before serving as principal of Briggs High School for 13 years.

== Later life and death ==
Fekete retired from Briggs in 1975 and was elected to the Ohio State Men's Varsity "O" Hall of Fame in 1998. He died in 2011 at Riverside Methodist Hospital in Columbus.
