= Bob Gaudio (American football) =

American football player (1925–2003)

- Gaudio (right) at a dinner in 1947

No. 34, 38
- Position: Guard

Personal information
- Born: July 13, 1925; Ashtabula, Ohio, U.S.
- Died: May 10, 2003 (aged 77); Miami, Florida, U.S.
- Listed height: 5 ft 10 in (1.78 m)
- Listed weight: 219 lb (99 kg)

Career information
- College: Ohio State University

Career history
- Cleveland Browns (1947–1949, 1951)

Awards and highlights
- 3× AAFC champion (1947, 1948, 1949)

Career statistics
- Games: 51
- Stats at Pro Football Reference

Angelo Robert Gaudio (July 13, 1925 – May 10, 2003) was an American football guard who played four seasons for the Cleveland Browns in the All-America Football Conference (AAFC) and National Football League (NFL) between 1947 and 1951.

Gaudio grew up in Cleveland, Ohio and attended college at Ohio State University, where he played as a guard for two seasons interrupted by service in World War II. He then joined the Browns, playing under head coach Paul Brown for three seasons before retiring. The Browns won the AAFC championship in each of Gaudio's years with the team. He came out of retirement to play a final season in Cleveland in 1951. After football, Gaudio worked for his family's construction business in Chagrin Falls, Ohio and later moved to Miami, Florida to start a construction business. He died in Miami in 2003.

== High school and college career ==
Gaudio attended Shaw High School in East Cleveland, Ohio and was a star guard on the school's football team for three seasons. He then enrolled at Ohio State University, continuing as a guard on the Ohio State Buckeyes football team beginning as a freshman in 1942. Gaudio was set to play in 1943 under head coach Paul Brown, but instead joined the Army Air Force during World War II.

== Professional football career ==
Gaudio returned to Ohio State after the war for the 1946 season. He then worked in the construction business with his father before joining the Cleveland Browns in the All-America Football Conference in the summer of 1947, despite having two years of college eligibility left. He barely made the team, but Brown, who had become the first coach of the Browns, called Gaudio "technically perfect" and said he had the speed and agility he wanted in a guard.

As part of Cleveland's offensive line, Gaudio helped protect quarterback Otto Graham and open up running room for fullback Marion Motley. He was used primarily in his first season as a defensive lineman, but played increasingly on offense the following year after assistant coach Blanton Collier praised his technique in an annual review of film from the previous season. He played more snaps in 1948 than veteran guard Lin Houston. "Lin hasn't lost his touch, he's just as good as ever," Browns guard coach Fritz Heisler said at the time. "But this fellow Gaudio has been doing a terrific job for us and we just can't keep him off the field."

Helped by strong line play, Cleveland finished the 1947 season with a 12–1–1 record and defeated the New York Yankees to win the AAFC championship. The team won the championship again in 1948, winning all of its games and turning in professional football's first perfect season. The Browns again won the AAFC championship in 1949, but the league dissolved after the season and the Browns were absorbed by the more established National Football League (NFL). Gaudio retired after the 1949 season, when he was 24 years old. He came out of retirement to play for the Browns in 1951. After the team lost the NFL championship game to the Los Angeles Rams, he retired for a second time to focus on his family's construction business.

== Later life and death ==
Gaudio settled in Chagrin Falls, Ohio and by the late 1950s was the vice president of the National Construction Company, a sewer contractor. He worked in the business with his father and two of his brothers, Anthony and Harry. He later started a construction company in Miami, Florida and owned J&B Gaudio Farms in Ocala, Florida. He helped found the Ocala Breeders' Sales Company, a thoroughbred racehorse auction firm, contributing a $250,000 personal loan. He died in 2003.
