= 1942 Minnesota Golden Gophers football team =

American college football season

1942 Minnesota Golden Gophers football
- Conference: Big Ten Conference

Ranking
- AP: No. 19
- Record: 5–4 (3–3 Big Ten)
- Head coach: George Hauser (1st season)
- MVP: Dick Wildung
- Captain: Dick Wildung
- Home stadium: Memorial Stadium

1942 Big Ten Conference football standings
	Conf.					Overall
Team	W		L		T	W		L		T
No. 1 Ohio State $	5	–	1	–	0	9	–	1	–	0
No. 3 Wisconsin	4	–	1	–	0	8	–	1	–	1
No. 9 Michigan	3	–	2	–	0	7	–	3	–	0
Illinois	3	–	2	–	0	6	–	4	–	0
Iowa	3	–	3	–	0	6	–	4	–	0
No. 19 Minnesota	3	–	3	–	0	5	–	4	–	0
Indiana	2	–	2	–	0	7	–	3	–	0
Purdue	1	–	4	–	0	1	–	8	–	0
Northwestern	0	–	6	–	0	1	–	9	–	0
$ – Conference champion; Rankings from AP Poll

The 1942 Minnesota Golden Gophers football team represented the University of Minnesota in the 1942 Big Ten Conference football season. In their first year under head coach George Hauser, the Golden Gophers compiled a 5–4 record and outscored their opponents by a combined total of 152 to 91. Minnesota was ranked No. 19 in the final AP poll and No. 10 in the final Litkenhous Difference by Score System rankings.

Tackle Dick Wildung was named an All-American by the Walter Camp Football Foundation, Associated Press, Stern, Collier's/Grantland Rice, Look Magazine. Wildung was also named All-Big Ten first team.

Dick Wildung was awarded the Team MVP Award.

The Gophers hosted the U.S. Navy Pre-Flight school at the University of Iowa. The Pre-Flight team was coached by Bernie Bierman, who had coached the Golden Gophers to five national titles between 1934 and 1941, and resumed coaching the Golden Gophers in 1945.

Total attendance for the season was 231,307, which averaged to 38,551. The season high for attendance was against Michigan.

== Schedule ==
Date	Opponent	Rank	Site	Result	Attendance	Source
September 26	Pittsburgh*		Memorial Stadium; Minneapolis, MN	W 50–7	22,000	
October 3	Iowa Pre-Flight*		Memorial Stadium; Minneapolis, MN	L 6–7	37,500	
October 10	at Illinois		Memorial Stadium; Champaign, IL	L 13–20	24,276	
October 17	at Nebraska*	No. 14	Memorial Stadium; Lincoln, NE (rivalry)	W 15–2	25,000	
October 24	No. 4 Michigan^{†}	No. 13	Memorial Stadium; Minneapolis, MN (Little Brown Jug)	W 16–14	55,000	
October 31	Northwestern	No. 10	Memorial Stadium; Minneapolis, MN	W 19–7	37,000	
November 7	Indiana	No. 7	Memorial Stadium; Minneapolis, MN	L 0–7	32,000	
November 14	No. 12 Iowa	No. 16	Memorial Stadium; Minneapolis, MN (rivalry)	W 27–7	33,000	
November 21	No. 7 Wisconsin	No. 10	Memorial Stadium; Minneapolis, MN (rivalry)	L 6–20	46,000	
*Non-conference game; ^{†}Homecoming; Rankings from AP Poll released prior to the game

== Rankings ==
Ranking movements Legend: ██ Increase in ranking ██ Decrease in ranking т = Tied with team above or below ( ) = First-place votes
	Week							
Poll	1	2	3	4	5	6	7	Final
AP	14 (1)	13	10	7 (1)	16	10	20	19т

== Game summaries ==
=== Michigan ===
Week 5: Michigan at Minnesota

Team	1	2	3	4	Total
Michigan	7	0	0	7	14
• Minnesota	0	7	7	7	21

- Date: October 24, 1942
- Location: Memorial Stadium
  Minneapolis, MN
- Game attendance: 55,000

In the fifth week of the season, Minnesota defeated Michigan, 16–14. Tom Kuzma ran for touchdowns in the first and fourth quarters, and Jim Brieske converted both PATs. Bill Daley, who would go on to play for Michigan in 1943, ran 44 yards for a tying touchdown in the second quarter.
