= 1942 All-America college football team =

Official list of the best college football players of 1942

The 1942 All-America college football team is composed of college football players who were selected as All-Americans by various organizations and writers that chose All-America college football teams in 1942. The nine selectors recognized by the NCAA as "official" for the 1942 season are (1) Collier's Weekly, as selected by Grantland Rice, (2) the Associated Press, (3) the United Press, (4) the All-America Board, (5) the International News Service (INS), (6) Look magazine, (7) the Newspaper Enterprise Association (NEA), (8) Newsweek, and (9) the Sporting News.

Two individuals were unanimous selections; they were Georgia halfback (and Heisman Trophy winner) Frank Sinkwich and Wisconsin end Dave Schreiner.

== Consensus All-Americans ==
For the year 1942, the NCAA recognizes nine published All-American teams as "official" designations for purposes of its consensus determinations. The following chart identifies the NCAA-recognized consensus All-Americans and displays which first-team designations they received.

Name	Position	School	UP votes	Number	Official selectors	Other selectors
Frank Sinkwich	Halfback	Georgia	1,004	9/9	AAB, AP, CO, INS, LK, NEA, NW, SN, UP	CP, MS, NYS, PL, WC
Dave Schreiner	End	Wisconsin	752	9/9	AAB, AP, CO, INS, LK, NEA, NW, SN, UP	CP, MS, NYS, PL, WC
Dick Wildung	Tackle	Minnesota	748	8/9	AAB, AP, CO, LK, NEA, NW, SN, UP	CP, MS, NYS, PL, WC
Mike Holovak	Fullback	Boston College	594	6/9	AP, CO, LK, NEA, NW, UP	CP, NYS
Paul Governali	Quarterback	Columbia	406	6/9	AAB, AP, CO, NW, SN, UP	CP, NYS, PL, WC
Joe Domnanovich	Center	Alabama	308	6/9	AAB, AP, CO, LK, NW, SN	PL
Billy Hillenbrand	Halfback	Indiana	486	5/9	AAB, CO, NEA, SN, UP	CP, NYS, WC
Bob Dove	End	Notre Dame	507	5/9	AAB, NEA, NW, SN, UP	WC
Al Wistert	Tackle	Michigan	532	4/9	AAB, LK, NW, UP	NYS, WC, MS, PL)
Harvey Hardy	Guard	Georgia Tech	516	4/9	INS, NEA, NW, UP	CP, NYS
Chuck Taylor	Guard	Stanford		4/9	AAB, AP, LK, SN	PL, WC
Julius Franks	Guard	Michigan		3/9	CO, INS, NW	CP

== All-American selections for 1942 ==
=== Ends ===
- Dave Schreiner, Wisconsin (College Football Hall of Fame) (AAB; AP-1; CO-1; INS-1; LK-1; NEA-1; NW; SN-1; UP-1; CP-1; NYS-1; WC-1; MS-1; PL)
- Bob Dove, Notre Dame (College Football Hall of Fame) (AAB; INS-2; NEA-1; NW; SN-1; UP-1; CP-2; NYS-2; WC-1)
- Don Currivan, Boston College (AP-2; UP-2; INS-1; NEA-3; CO-1; NYS-1)
- Bob Shaw, Ohio State (AP-1; SN-3; CP-1)
- George Poschner, Georgia (AP-2; UP-2; SN-2; CP-3; NEA-2; MS-1)
- Bruce Alford, TCU (AP-3)
- Al Hust, Tennessee (AP-3; INS-2; NEA-2)
- Nick Susoeff, Washington State ( NYS-2)
- James Kelleher, Army (SN-3; NEA-3)
- Bert Kuczynski, Penn (LK-1)
- Pete Pihos, Indiana (PL)
- Bob Gantt, Duke (SN-2)
- Alyn Beals, Santa Clara (CP-2)
- Saxon Judd, Tulsa (CP-3)

=== Tackles ===
- Dick Wildung, Minnesota (College Football Hall of Fame) (AAB; AP-1; CO-1; LK-1; NEA-1; NW; SN-1; UP-1; CP-1; NYS-1; WC-1; MS-1; PL)
- Al Wistert, Michigan (College Football Hall of Fame) (AAB; AP-2; LK-1; NEA-3; NW; SN-2; UP-1; CP-3; NYS-1; WC-1; MS-1; PL)
- Clyde Johnson, Kentucky (AP-1)
- Stan Mauldin, Texas (AP-2; CP-1)
- Don Whitmire, Alabama (College Football Hall of Fame) (AP-3; SN-3; NEA-1)
- Norm Verry, USC (AP-3)
- Derrell Palmer, TCU (SN-3; INS-1; CP-2)
- Francis E. Merritt, Army (College Football Hall of Fame) (CP-2; NEA-2)
- Al Klug, Marquette (CP-3)
- Chuck Csuri, Ohio State (UP-2; SN-2; INS-1; NYS-2)
- Gil Bouley, Boston College (UP-2; SN-1; CP-2; NEA-3)
- Robin Olds, Army (CO-1; NYS-2)
- Lou Rymkus, Notre Dame ( NEA-2)
- Don McCafferty, Ohio State (INS-2)
- John Donaldson, Penn (INS-2)

=== Guards ===
- Harvey Hardy, Georgia Tech (AP-2; INS-1; NEA-1; NW; UP-1; CP-1; NYS-1)
- Chuck Taylor, Stanford (College Football Hall of Fame)(AAB; AP-1; LK-1; SN-1; CP-3; NEA-2; WC-1; PL)
- Julius Franks, Michigan (AP-2; CO-1; INS-1; NEA-2; NW; SN-3; CP-1; NYS-2)
- Merv Pregulman, Michigan (SN-3; NEA-1; MS-1 [4-way tie])
- Buster Ramsey, William & Mary (College Football Hall of Fame) (AP-1; SN-2; CP-2; NYS-2; MS-1 [4-way tie])
- Jack Lescoulie, UCLA (AP-3; INS-2)
- Lindell Houston, Ohio State (AAB; AP-3; CO-1; CP-2; UP-2; NEA-3; NYS-1; WC-1; PL)
- Alex Agase, Illinois (College Football Hall of Fame) (LK-1; UP-1; SN-1; INS-2; CP-3; NEA-3; MS-1 [4-way tie])
- Harry C. Wright, Notre Dame (SN-2)
- George Hecht, Alabama ( MS-1 [4-way tie])
- Rocco Canale, Boston College (UP-2)

=== Centers ===
- Joe Domnanovich, Alabama (AAB; AP-1; CO-1; INS-2; LK-1; NW; SN-1; UP-2; CP-1; NYS-1; WC-1; MS-1; PL)
- Spencer Moseley, Yale (AP-3; UP-1; SN-2; CP-2; NEA-1)
- Fred Naumetz, Boston College (SN-3; INS-1; CP-3; NYS-2)
- Lou Sossamon, South Carolina (AP-2)
- Walt Harrison, Washington (NEA-2)
- Buddy Gatewood, Baylor (NEA-3)

=== Quarterbacks ===
- Paul Governali, Columbia (College Football Hall of Fame) (AAB; AP-1; CO-1; NEA-3; NW; SN-1; UP-1; CP-2; NYS-1; WC-1; PL)
- Glenn Dobbs, Tulsa (College Football Hall of Fame) (AP-1; INS-1; NEA-1; NW; SN-2; UP-2; CP-2; NYS-2)
- Angelo Bertelli, Notre Dame (College Football Hall of Fame) (LK-1; SN-2; UP-2; CP-3)
- Jesse Freitas, Santa Clara (AP-3)
- Clint Castleberry, Georgia Tech (AP-3; UP-2; SN-3; INS-2; NEA-2)
- Otto Graham, Northwestern (College and Pro Hall of Fame) (SN-3; CP-3)

=== Halfbacks ===
- Frank Sinkwich, Georgia (College Football Hall of Fame) (AAB; AP-1; CO-1; INS-1; LK-1; NEA-1; NW; SN-1; UP-1; CP-1; NYS-1; WC-1; MS-1; PL)
- Billy Hillenbrand, Indiana (AAB; AP-2; UP-1; SN-1; CP-1; NEA-1; CO-1; NYS-1; WC-1)
- Monk Gafford, Auburn (AP-2; INS-1; CP-3; NYS-2; PL)
- Bob Steuber, Missouri (College Football Hall of Fame) (AP-2; SN-1; CP-2; NEA-2; NYS-2; PL)
- Bill Daley, Minnesota (SN-3; CP-2; NEA-3; MS-1)
- J. T. "Blondy" Black, Mississippi State (CP-3; NEA-3)
- Gene Fekete, Ohio State (SN-3; CP-3)
- Jackie Fellows, Fresno State (LK-1; MS-1)
- Henry Mazur, Army (INS-2)

=== Fullbacks ===
- Mike Holovak, Boston College (College Football Hall of Fame) (AP-1; CO-1; LK-1; NEA-1; NW; UP-1; CP-1; NYS-1)
- Bob Kennedy, Washington State (AP-2; INS-1; CP-1)
- Pat Harder, Wisconsin (College Football Hall of Fame) (AAB; P-3; UP-2; SN-2; INS-2; NEA-2; NYS-2; WC-1; MS-1)
- Joe Muha, VMI (NEA-3)
- Roy McKay, Texas (INS-2)

== Key ==
Bold = Consensus All-American

- 1 – First-team selection
- 2 – Second-team selection
- 3 – Third-team selection

=== Official selectors ===
- AAB = All-America Board
- AP = Associated Press
- CO = Collier's Weekly, selected by Grantland Rice
- INS = International News Service
- LK = NBC radio and Look magazine, selected under the supervision of Bill Stern, by 138 sports announcers and 25 key sports writers
- NEA = Newspaper Enterprise Association
- NW = Newsweek
- SN = Sporting News, selected through a poll of 86 sports writers in 40 states
- UP = United Press

=== Other selectors ===
- CP = Central Press Association, selected with the assistance of the nation's football captains
- NYS = New York Sun
- WC = Walter Camp Football Foundation
- MS = Maxwell Stiles, noted California sports writer, based on the number of weeks a player was named player of the week at his position
- PL = All-Players All-America team selected based on ballots cast by 1,706 major college lettermen and announced by Norman Sper, a radio football broadcaster

== See also ==
- 1942 Little All-America college football team
- 1942 All-Big Six Conference football team
- 1942 All-Big Ten Conference football team
- 1942 All-Pacific Coast Conference football team
- 1942 All-SEC football team
