= Dave Schreiner =

American football player (1921–1945)

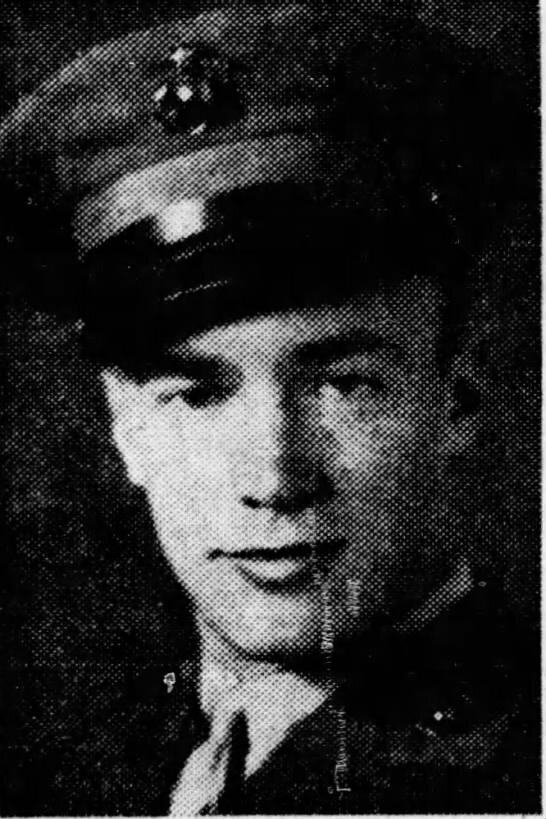
- Schreiner in his military uniform

No. 80
- Position: End

Personal information
- Born: March 5, 1921; Lancaster, Wisconsin, U.S.
- Died: June 21, 1945 (aged 24); Okinawa, Ryukyu Islands, Japanese Empire
- Listed height: 6 ft 2 in (1.88 m)
- Listed weight: 198 lb (90 kg)

Career information
- High school: Lancaster
- College: Wisconsin (1940–1942)

Awards and highlights
- National champion (1942); Unanimous All-American (1942); First-team All-American (1941); Chicago Tribune Silver Football (1942); 2× First-team All-Big Ten (1941, 1942); Wisconsin Badgers No. 80 retired
- College Football Hall of Fame (Class of 1955)

David Nathan Schreiner (March 5, 1921 – June 21, 1945) was an American football player. From Lancaster in southwest Wisconsin, he was a two-time All-American and the 1942 Big Ten Most Valuable Player end at Wisconsin and a 1943 first round draft choice (11th overall) of the Detroit Lions of the National Football League (NFL).

Instead of playing in the NFL, he went to serve in the Marines during WWII. He was mortally wounded in action by a grenade on June 20, 1945, during the Battle of Okinawa and died the next day. Coincidentally, fellow #11 overall NFL draft pick (1944) Tony Butkovich had died from sniper fire at Okinawa two months earlier.

He was elected to the College Football Hall of Fame in 1955. His life and death are detailed in the book Third Down and a War to Go, written by Terry Frei, the son of Jerry Frei, one of Schreiner's teammates on the 1942 Wisconsin Badgers football team.
