= Paul Sarringhaus =

American football player (1920–1998)

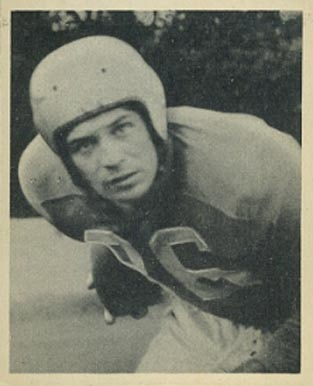
- Sarringhaus on a 1948 Bowman football card

No. 40, 17, 14, 18, 11, 32, 23
- Position: Halfback

Personal information
- Born: August 13, 1920; Hamilton, Ohio, U.S.
- Died: April 7, 1998 (aged 77); Middletown, Ohio, U.S.
- Listed height: 6 ft 0 in (1.83 m)
- Listed weight: 185 lb (84 kg)

Career information
- High school: Hamilton
- College: Ohio State (1940–1942, 1945)
- NFL draft: 1944: 9th round, 80th overall pick

Career history
- Philadelphia Eagles (1946)*; Chicago Cardinals (1946); Detroit Lions (1946); Wilmington Clippers (1946–1947); Detroit Lions (1948); Wilmington Clippers (1948); Jersey City Giants (1949); Bethlehem Bulldogs (1949)
- * Offseason or practice squad member only

Awards and highlights
- National champion (1942); First-team All-Big Ten (1942)

Career NFL statistics
- Rushing yards: 39
- Rushing average: 1.9
- Return yards: 95
- Stats at Pro Football Reference

Paul Richard Sarringhaus (August 13, 1920 – April 7, 1998) was an American professional football halfback who played two seasons in the National Football League (NFL) with the Chicago Cardinals and Detroit Lions. He was selected by the Philadelphia Eagles in the ninth round of the 1944 NFL draft. He played college football at Ohio State University. He was on the cover of the October 22, 1945, edition of Life.

== Early life and college ==
Paul Richard Sarringhaus was born on August 13, 1920, in Hamilton, Ohio. He attended Hamilton High School in Hamilton.

Sarringhaus was first a member of the Ohio State Buckeyes of Ohio State University from 1940 to 1942 and a two-year letterman from 1941 to 1942. In 1942, he was named second-team All-Big Ten by the Associated Press and first-team All-Big Ten by the United Press. The 1942 Buckeyes were AP Poll national champions. Sarringhaus then served in the United States Army during World War II. He returned to Ohio State in 1945 and was a letterman that season. He was featured on the cover of the October 22, 1945, edition of Life.

== Professional career ==
Sarringhaus was selected by the Philadelphia Eagles in the ninth round, with the 80th overall pick, of the 1944 NFL draft. He signed with the Eagles in 1946.

Sarringhaus was purchased by the Chicago Cardinals on September 23, 1946. He played in two games for the Cardinals during the 1946 season, rushing twice for one yard, before being released On October 8, 1946.

Sarringhaus was claimed off waivers by the Detroit Lions on October 8, 1946. However, he was released six days later without appearing in a game.

He played in six games, all starts, for the Wilmington Clippers of the American Football League (AFL) in 1946, catching 15 passes for 148 yards and one touchdown while also scoring one rushing touchdown. He appeared in eight games, starting five, during the 1947 season, recording 68 carries for 335 yards and two touchdowns.

Sarringhaus signed with the Detroit Lions on July 27, 1948. He played in five games, starting two, for the Lions in 1948, totaling 19 rushing attempts for 38 yards, one reception for no yards, and five kick returns for 95 yards. He was released on October 26, 1948.

Sarringhaus signed with the Clippers again on October 29, 1948. He appeared in four games for the Clippers that year and scored three rushing touchdowns.

Sarringhaus played in seven games, starting four, for the Jersey City Giants of the AFL in 1949, scoring two rushing touchdowns. He then played in two games, starting one, for the AFL's Bethlehem Bulldogs that season as well.

== Personal life ==
Sarringhaus died on April 7, 1998, in Middletown, Ohio.
