= Charles Csuri =

American computer artist (1922–2022)

- Born: July 4, 1922; Grant Town, West Virginia, U.S.
- Died: February 27, 2022 (aged 99); Lakewood Ranch, Florida, U.S.
- Known for: Computer art pioneer
- Football career

Ohio State Buckeyes
- Position: Tackle

Career information
- College: Ohio State (1942)

Awards and highlights
- National champion (1942); First-team All-American (1942); Second-team All-Big Ten (1942)

Charles "Chuck" Csuri (July 4, 1922 – February 27, 2022) was an American artist and computer art creator, described by the Smithsonian magazine as the "father of digital art and computer animation."

== Early life ==
Csuri was born in Grant Town, West Virginia, on July 4, 1922, to parents from Hungary. He grew up in Cleveland, Ohio.

== College football career ==
Csuri attended Ohio State University on a football scholarship. He became captain of their first national championship football team, and is in the College Football Hall of Fame as MVP in the 1942 Big Ten Conference. He was selected in the 1944 NFL draft by the Chicago Cardinals (16th round, 154th overall pick), but declined the offer in order to serve in World War II.

== Military service ==
Csuri served in the U.S. Army from 1943 to 1946, receiving the Bronze Star in 1945 for heroism in the Battle of the Bulge.

== Teaching career ==
Csuri returned to Ohio State and completed his MA in art in 1948. In 1949, he joined the faculty of the Department of Art at the university. He became a full Professor of Art Education in 1978, a Professor of Computer Information Science in 1986, and Professor Emeritus in 1990.

== Digital art ==
Csuri created his first digital art pieces in 1964, and was quickly recognized by the Museum of Modern Art (MoMA) and the Association for Computing Machinery Special Interest Group Graphics (ACM SIGGRAPH). In particular, his 1967 short film Hummingbird, a collaboration with James Shaffer, is in MoMa's permanent collection as one of the earliest surviving examples of computer animation. Csuri taught for over forty years at Ohio State University, and between 1971 and 1987 established a series of groundbreaking graphics research centers there: the Computer Graphics Research Group, the Ohio Supercomputer Graphics Project, and Cranston/Csuri Productions, which spun off from the university in 1981 to become one of the world's first computer animation production companies. In 1987, these groups combined to form the Advanced Computing Center for Arts and Design (ACCAD), which remains in operation as of 2025. In 2000, Csuri received an Ohio Governor's Award for the Arts and Ohio State's Sullivant Medal, the institution's highest honor, in acknowledgement of his lifetime achievements. A retrospective exhibit of seventy of Csuri's artworks, titled Beyond Boundaries, traveled to museums throughout Europe and Asia in 2010. Other notable works by Csuri include Random War (1967), Sine Curve Man (1967), Wondrous Spring (1992), Spinning (1994), A Happy Time (1996), Random War Pics (2013), Despair (2016), Doddle (2016), Old Age (2016), and ribFIG (2016).

== Death ==
Csuri died in Lakewood Ranch, Florida, on February 27, 2022, at the age of 99.
