= Cook Lougheed =

American politician

Cook O.P. Lougheed

Allen County Councilman

Personal details
- Born: April 8, 1922 Montpelier, Ohio, USA
- Died: April 23, 2008 (aged 86) Fort Wayne, Indiana, USA
- Party: Republican
- Spouse: Jeanne S. Lougheed
- Education: Purdue University
- Occupation: Entrepreneur, Civic Leader
- Website: www.cooklougheed.com

Cook Olin Pierre "O.P." Lougheed (April 8, 1922 – April 23, 2008) was a Fort Wayne entrepreneur, Allen County Councilman, civil leader and philanthropist. He was well known for his lengthy service to the Fort Wayne Children's Zoo, Parkview Hospital and the Boy Scouts of America.

A longtime Fort Wayne resident, Lougheed started the Earth Construction Company in the 1950s. A highly successful businessman, at one time, Cook was president of 11 different companies, involving real estate and lake developments and equipment. He was inducted into the Greater Fort Wayne Junior Achievement Business and Education Leaders Hall of Fame in 2004 and received one of scouting's highest awards - the Distinguished Eagle Scout Award in 1977.

In addition to his entrepreneurial success, Cook volunteered with many local organizations. He served the Fort Wayne Zoological Society for 34 years (two years as board president). Contributing to the development of the African Safari Veldt was one of his greatest accomplishments.

He served Parkview Hospital for 30 years. In fact, the Frances Slocum Elementary School was renamed the Lougheed Center to honor Cook for all his years of service on the Parkview Hospital Board.

He also served the Association of Building Contractors, Greater Fort Wayne Chamber of Commerce, Fort Wayne Rotary Club, Kiwanis, The John Purdue Club and his local church, to name a few. He was elected Allen County Councilman in the 1970s.
