= Bob Shaw (end) =

American football player, coach, and executive (1921–2011)

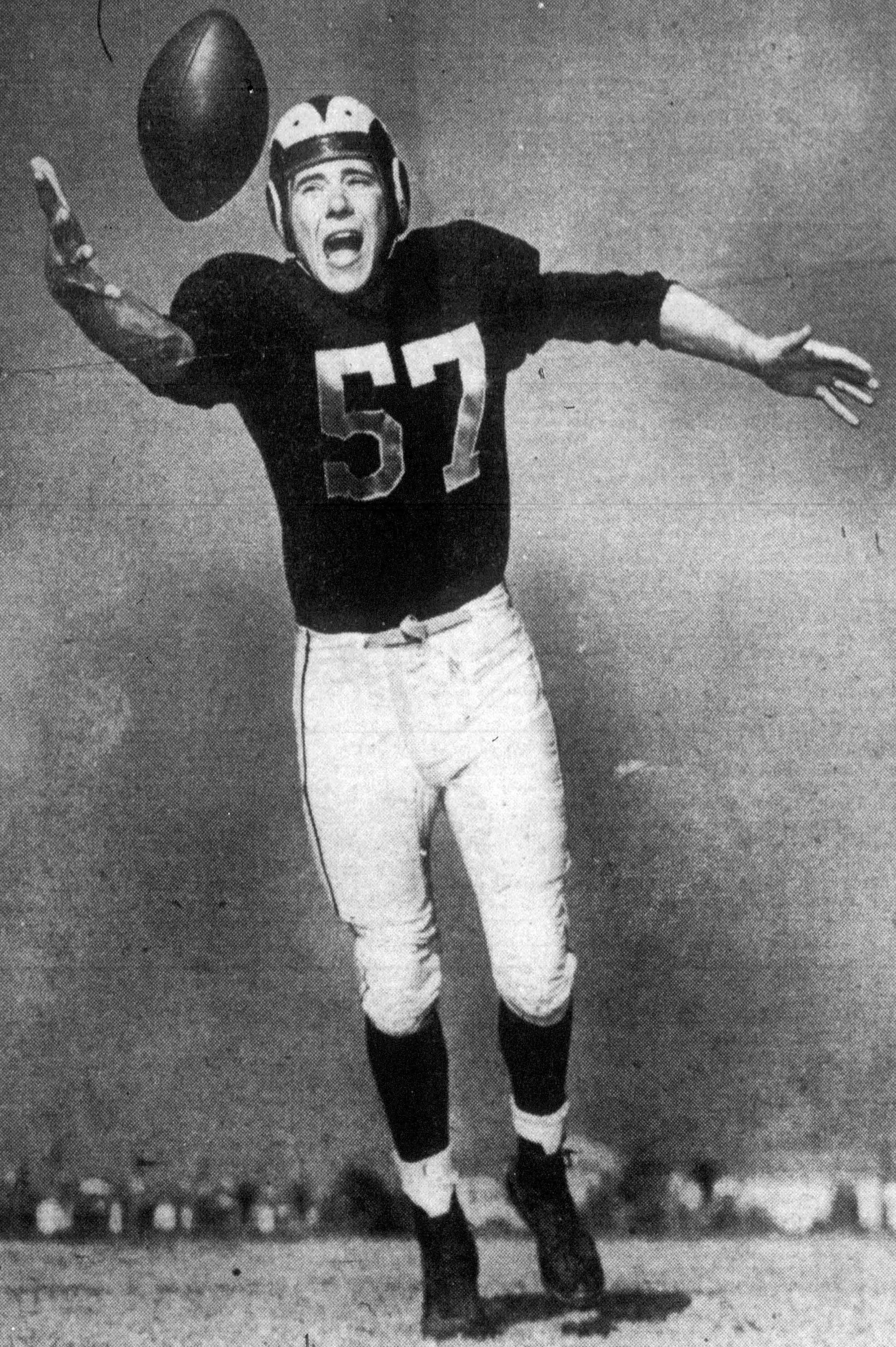
- Shaw, c. 1949

No. 32, 60, 77
- Position: End

Personal information
- Born: May 22, 1921; Richwood, Ohio, U.S.
- Died: April 10, 2011 (aged 89); Westerville, Ohio, U.S.
- Listed height: 6 ft 4 in (1.93 m)
- Listed weight: 226 lb (103 kg)

Career information
- High school: Fremont Ross (Fremont, Ohio)
- College: Ohio State (1941-1942)
- NFL draft: 1944: 10th round, 97th overall pick

Career history

Playing
- Cleveland / Los Angeles Rams (1945–1946; 1949); Chicago Cardinals (1950); Calgary Stampeders (1951–1952); Toronto Argonauts (1953)

Coaching
- Calgary Stampeders (1951) Line coach; Baltimore Colts (1957–1958) End coach; San Francisco 49ers (1959) Offensive ends/backfield coach; New Mexico Military (1960–1962) Head coach; Saskatchewan Roughriders (1963–1964) Head coach; Toronto Argonauts (1965–1966) Head coach; New Orleans Saints (1967–1968) Receivers coach; Chicago Bears (1969–1972) End coach; Buffalo Bills (1973–1974) Receivers coach; Hamilton Tiger-Cats (1976–1977) Head coach; Otterbein (1981–1984) Defensive coordinator; Otterbein (1985–1987) Head coach

Operations
- New Mexico Military (1960–1963) Athletic director; Hamilton Tiger-Cats (1976–1979) General manager

Awards and highlights
- As player: National champion (1942); NFL champion (1945); Pro Bowl (1950); NFL receiving touchdowns leader (1950); 2× Dave Dryburgh Memorial Trophy (1951, 1952); First-team All-American (1942); First-team All-Big Ten (1942); Second-team All-Big Ten (1941); As coach: NFL champion (1958); Annis Stukus Trophy (1976)

Career NFL statistics
- Receptions: 81
- Receiving yards: 1,569
- Receiving touchdowns: 20
- Stats at Pro Football Reference

Robert Shaw (May 22, 1921 – April 10, 2011) was an American football player and coach. He played professionally as an end in the National Football League (NFL) and Canadian Football League (CFL). He played college football for the Ohio State Buckeyes.

== Early life ==
Shaw lettered three times each in football, basketball and track at Fremont Ross High School. He was first-team All-Ohio in both football and basketball and won the shot put and discus in the state track and field meet. At Ohio State University, he lettered twice in football. Playing right end, on both offense and defense, Shaw was part of the Buckeyes' first NCAA national championship team in 1942 and was named a first-team All American for that season. He also lettered in basketball and track, helping the Buckeyes to their first Western Conference track crown in 1942. Shaw was inducted into Ohio State University Athletic Hall of Fame in 1996.

He served with the 104th Infantry Division in the European Theater during World War II, and he was subsequently awarded a Bronze Star Medal. He later completed his bachelor's degree in education at Otterbein College.

== Professional football career ==
Shaw began his NFL career began in 1945 when he joined the Cleveland Rams. He played as an end. The Rams won the championship in his rookie year. In the off-season, he played for the Toledo Jeeps of the National Basketball League.

He played for the Cleveland/Los Angeles Rams (1945–1949) and the Chicago Cardinals (1950). He was the NFL leader in receiving touchdowns with 12 in 1950 and was the first player to catch five touchdowns in a game. He played two seasons for the Calgary Stampeders, winning the Dave Dryburgh Memorial Trophy in 1951 and 1952. After his release by Calgary, he signed with the Toronto Argonauts in late September 1953 on the strength of his place-kicking.

After his retirement, Shaw served as an assistant coach with the Baltimore Colts, and San Francisco 49ers before becoming head coach of the New Mexico Military Institute in 1960. In three seasons at NMMI, Shaw had a 22–6–1 record. He later moved to the Canadian Football League where he coached the Saskatchewan Roughriders to a 16–14–2 record over two seasons and the Toronto Argonauts to an 8–20 record from 1965 to 1966. In 1976, he won the Annis Stukus Trophy (coach of the year) while with the Hamilton Tiger-Cats.

He lived in Cooksville during his time coaching the Argos.

== Personal life and death ==
Shaw died April 10, 2011, at his home in Westerville, Ohio, after a brief illness at the age of 89. He was predeceased by his wife of 63 years, Mary Garr.

== Head coaching record ==
=== College ===
Year	Team	Overall	Conference	Standing	Bowl/playoffs
Otterbein Cardinals (Ohio Athletic Conference) (1985–1987)
1985	Otterbein	0–10	0–8	9th	
1986	Otterbein	1–9	1–7	8th	
1987	Otterbein	2–8	1–7	T–8th	
Otterbein:		3–27	2–22		
Total:		3–27			
