= Billy Hillenbrand =

American football player (1922–1994)

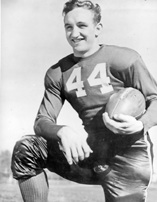

No. 66, 82
- Positions: Halfback, return specialist

Personal information
- Born: March 29, 1922; Armstrong, Indiana, U.S.
- Died: July 17, 1994 (aged 72); Indianapolis, Indiana, U.S.
- Listed height: 6 ft 0 in (1.83 m)
- Listed weight: 188 lb (85 kg)

Career information
- High school: Reitz Memorial (Evansville, Indiana)
- College: Indiana (1940-1942)
- NFL draft: 1944: 1st round, 6th overall pick

Career history
- Chicago Rockets (1946); Baltimore Colts (1947–1948)

Awards and highlights
- AAFC receiving yards leader (1948); Consensus All-American (1942); 2× First-team All-Big Ten (1941, 1942)

Career AAFC statistics
- Rushing yards: 889
- Rushing average: 4.1
- Receptions: 110
- Receiving yards: 1,987
- Total touchdowns: 31
- Return yards: 1,654
- Return touchdowns: 3
- Stats at Pro Football Reference

William Frank Hillenbrand (March 29, 1922 – July 17, 1994) was an American professional football halfback and return specialist who played professionally in the All-America Football Conference (AAFC). He attended Indiana University, where he played for the Indiana Hoosiers. In 1942, he was a consensus All-American and was drafted by the New York Giants in the first round (sixth overall) in the 1944 NFL draft. After serving with the Army during World War II, he played three seasons in the AAFC from 1946 to 1948 for the Chicago Rockets and Baltimore Colts. He was a versatile player, who scored 186 points gained over 4,000 all-purpose yards in three years of professional football—1,987 receiving, 1,042 on kickoff returns, 889 rushing, and 612 on punt returns. He also had a 48-yard interception return, a 96-yard kickoff return, and an 89-yard punt return. In 1948, his total of 970 receiving yards, and his average of 11.2 yards per touch was the best in the AAFC, and his total of 2,067 all-purpose yards was second best in the league.

== AAFC career statistics ==
Legend
	Led the league
**Bold**	Career high

=== Regular season ===
Year	Team	Games		Rushing				Receiving			
Year	Team	GP	GS	Att	Yds	Avg	TD	Rec	Yds	Avg	TD
1946	CHR	14	9	50	175	3.5	2	21	315	15.0	4
1947	BCL	13	13	66	204	3.1	2	39	702	18.0	**7**
1948	BCL	14	13	**100**	**510**	**5.1**	**7**	**50**	**970**	**19.4**	6
		41	35	216	889	4.1	11	110	1,987	18.1	17

=== Playoffs ===
Year	Team	Games		Rushing				Receiving			
Year	Team	GP	GS	Att	Yds	Avg	TD	Rec	Yds	Avg	TD
1948	BCL	1	1	6	5	0.8	0	7	75	10.7	0
		1	1	6	5	0.8	0	7	75	10.7	0

== See also ==
- List of NCAA major college yearly punt and kickoff return leaders
