= Lin Houston =

American football player (1921–1995)

- Houston while playing for the Cleveland Browns

No. 32, 62
- Position: Guard

Personal information
- Born: January 11, 1921; Carbondale, Illinois, U.S.
- Died: September 9, 1995 (aged 74); Canton, Ohio, U.S.
- Listed height: 6 ft 0 in (1.83 m)
- Listed weight: 213 lb (97 kg)

Career information
- High school: Massillon Washington (Massillon, Ohio)
- College: Ohio State
- NFL draft: 1944: 11th round, 106th overall pick

Career history
- Cleveland Browns (1946-1953)

Awards and highlights
- NFL champion (1950); 4× AAFC champion (1946–1949); National champion (1942); First-team All-American (1942); First-team All-Big Ten (1942); Second-team All-Big Ten (1941)

Career NFL/AAFC statistics
- Games played: 98
- Games started: 43
- Fumble recoveries: 1
- Stats at Pro Football Reference

Lindell Lee Houston (January 11, 1921 – September 9, 1995) was an American football guard who played eight seasons in the All-America Football Conference (AAFC) and in the National Football League (NFL) with the Cleveland Browns. He was the older brother of Jim Houston.

Houston played with the Browns from their inception in 1946 through the 1953 season. Cleveland reached the league championship game in each of Houston eight seasons with the club, winning four times between 1946 and 1949 in the AAFC and once in the NFL in 1950. Houston played for coach Paul Brown during every phase of his football career: at Massillon (Ohio) High School, Ohio State and the Browns. He retired from football after the 1953 season and worked as an executive in the steel industry. He died in 1995.

== High school and college career ==
Houston was born in Illinois, but his family moved to Ohio after a relative got a job at a steel mill in Massillon and convinced his father to move there. Houston had been a standout basketball player in Illinois, but Paul Brown, the head football coach at Massillon Washington High School, thought his combination of quickness and size would make him a good football player. He started as a middle guard on defense but was soon switched to an offensive guard, where he excelled. The Associated Press named him a first-team All-Ohio guard in 1938.

After graduating from high school, Houston attended Ohio State University. He played as a guard on the school's varsity football team starting as a sophomore in 1941 under Paul Brown, who had by then been hired as the school's head football coach. Houston sat out for two weeks with a knee injury but returned to finish the season, and in 1942 became a regular starter at right guard. Collier's named him an All-American that season, when the Ohio State Buckeyes football team won the school's first national championship.

Houston joined the U.S. Army in 1943. He stayed at Ohio State but was not allowed by the Army to play on the football team. In 1944, he played in the College All-Star Game against the Chicago Bears.

== Professional career ==
Houston signed in 1946 with the Cleveland Browns, a professional team under formation in the new All-America Football Conference and coached by Paul Brown. Houston became a starter when Bill Willis was ill in 1946. The Browns won the AAFC championship that year.

In later seasons, Houston rotated with Bob Gaudio as part of a system where Brown used guard substitutions to relay plays to his quarterback. The Browns won three more AAFC championships in 1947, 1948 and 1949 before the league dissolved and the Browns were absorbed by the more established National Football League. The Browns won the NFL championship in 1950, their first season in the league.

Houston's job was to protect quarterback Otto Graham and open up running room for fullback Marion Motley. He was known for his toughness and durability. In a 1950 game against the Washington Redskins in which the Browns were ahead 24 points, he rushed through five Redskins players to make a tackle on a kickoff, risking injury. He played through a bad cold and injuries to his shoulder and face. Brown used him as a model to demonstrate blocking technique in training camp.

The Browns reached the championship game in 1951 and 1952 but lost both times. Despite his reputation for durability, Houston suffered from numerous injuries during his career and announced he would retire after the 1952 season. He changed his mind, however, and returned in 1953, when the Browns again reached the championship game but lost to the Detroit Lions. He retired for good in 1954, after 12 years playing for Paul Brown's teams. He left the game to concentrate on his job at the Sharon Steel Products Company.

== Later life and death ==
Houston spent much of his life after football as a steel executive. He died of cancer in 1995 and was inducted into the Stark County High School Football Hall of Fame in 2008.
