= Julius Franks =

Player of American football (1922–2008)

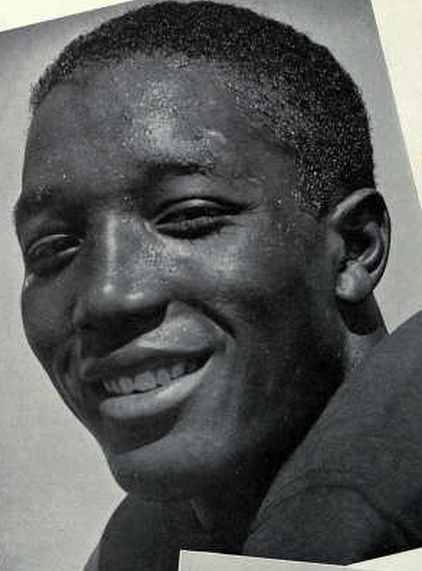
- Franks, c. 1942

No. 63
- Position: Guard

Personal information
- Born: September 5, 1922; Macon, Georgia, U.S.
- Died: November 26, 2008 (aged 86); Grand Rapids, Michigan, U.S.
- Listed height: 6 ft 0 in (1.83 m)
- Listed weight: 187 lb (85 kg)

Career information
- High school: Hamtramck (MI)
- College: Michigan
- NFL draft: 1944: undrafted

Awards and highlights
- Consensus All-American (1942); First-team All-Big Ten (1942)

Julius "Julie" Franks, Jr. (September 5, 1922 – November 26, 2008) was a civil rights leader and an All-American who played football as a guard at the University of Michigan from 1941 to 1942. Franks wore #62 as a varsity letterman in 1941 and #63 in 1942. Franks was the first (or second depending on the source) African-American University of Michigan player to become an All-American in football. Illness cut short his collegiate athletic career.

After Michigan, Franks pursued a career in dentistry. He also became an active community leader who contributed his time to public service and who helped to integrate Grand Rapids, Michigan by financing home construction in a majority Caucasian neighborhood.

== First African-American All-American football player at Michigan ==
Julius Franks was born in Macon, Georgia, and raised in Hamtramck, Michigan. He was named to the Detroit, Michigan, all-city team after the 1939 high school football season. He is the son of Julius Franks, Sr. and Nellie Mae Solomon and father of Daryl, Cheryl, Bobby, Beverly A Grant, Fredrick. After graduating from high school, he attended the University of Michigan, where he became the third African-American to play for the Michigan Wolverines football team. In 1942, he became the first African-American at Michigan to earn All-American honors. He is described as the second to be All-American by some accounts.

Franks as a Michigan All-American in 1942

Head coach Fritz Crisler said Franks was one of the hardest-working players he ever coached. The 1942 Wolverines' offensive line, which included Franks, Al Wistert, Robert Kolesar, Merv Pregulman, and Elmer Madar, was known as the "Seven Oak Posts". Franks credited the group's success to scrimmaging as rookies against the 1940 offense that included Tom Harmon, Forest Evashevski, and Bob Westfall. Franks was played all 60 minute in his games as a junior in 1942 and was named a first-team All American by the International News Service (Hearst newspapers), Central Press, and Collier's Weekly, and a second-team All-American by the Associated Press and New York Sun.

In 1943, Franks and teammate Tom Kuzma came down with tuberculosis and were hospitalized at University Hospital for 25 months as they recuperated. Franks recalled that head coach Fritz Crisler was a regular visitor to his hospital room, and team star Tom Harmon also stopped to visit while on leave from military service. As a result of the hospitalization, Franks missed his senior year as a football player. He obtained his Bachelor of Science degree in 1947.

In 1982, Franks was named to the University of Michigan Hall of Honor in the fifth class of inductees that was inducted in 1983. He was the twelfth Michigan football player to earn this honor.

== Professional career and community service ==
In 1951, Franks earned his D.D.S. from the University of Michigan Dental School, and practiced dentistry in Grand Rapids, Michigan for more than 40 years. Franks was a leader in the Urban League, United Way, American Red Cross, Boy Scouts of America, and Rotary Club. In 1964, Michigan Governor George Romney appointed Franks to Western Michigan University's first Board of Trustees, where he served as a trustee until 1983. Franks served on several boards: Executive Communication, Vice President, President, 1951–87; Kent County Dental Society, 1951–92; Michigan & American Dental Association, 1951–96; trustee, Western Michigan University, 1964–82 (trustee emeritus, 1983); Director, Boulevard Memorial Medical Center, 1974–84; Director, United Way Kent County, 1987–92. In 1992, Franks contracted Guillain–Barré syndrome, which forced him into retirement.

In the 1960s, Franks helped to integrate Grand Rapids. In the early 1960s, African Americans were not welcome in Grand Rapids' "white" middle-class neighborhoods, and real estate agents would not show them houses. In 1962, Franks' friend, J.E. Adams, found vacant land designated as a potential park site. Adams, Franks, and friends Joseph Lee and Samuel Triplett created a plan to purchase the 20 acres (80,937 m^{2}) site and build a middle-class neighborhood for African-Americans. The announcement "caused an uproar that resulted in protests, lawsuits and threats." When banks refused to finance the project, the four men purchased the land on their own for $60,000 and started building. The first of 51 houses was completed in 1965. Today, the neighborhood, known as Auburn Hills (not to be confused with Auburn Hills, Michigan), has a population of 542 and the lowest crime rate in Grand Rapids. In 2006, the Michigan Alumni Club gave Franks the "Paul G. Goebel, Sr. Distinguished Alumni in Athletics Award". In later years, Franks was also a leader with the Urban League, United Way and other groups.

== See also ==
- University of Michigan Athletic Hall of Honor

== Sources ==
- Jim Cnockaert, "Michigan: Where Have You Gone?" (2004 Sports Publishing), pp. 76–79.
