= Tom Farmer (American football) =

American football player (1921–1980)

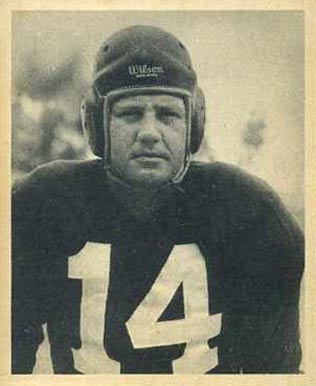
- Farmer on a 1948 Bowman football card

No. 34, 14
- Position: Halfback

Personal information
- Born: April 17, 1921; Cedar Rapids, Iowa, U.S.
- Died: July 1, 1980 (aged 59); Iowa City, Iowa, U.S.
- Listed height: 5 ft 11 in (1.80 m)
- Listed weight: 190 lb (86 kg)

Career information
- College: Iowa
- NFL draft: 1943: 2nd round, 15th overall pick

Career history
- Los Angeles Rams (1946); Washington Redskins (1947–1948)

Awards and highlights
- Second-team All-Big Ten (1942)

Career NFL statistics
- Rushing yards: 307
- Rushing average: 3.2
- Receptions: 26
- Receiving yards: 302
- Total touchdowns: 5
- Stats at Pro Football Reference

Thomas Manduis Farmer (April 17, 1921 – July 1, 1980) was an American professional football halfback in the National Football League (NFL). He played for the Los Angeles Rams (1946) and the Washington Redskins (1947–1948).

== Biography ==
Farmer was born in Cedar Rapids, Iowa, and played college football and baseball at the University of Iowa. He was drafted in the second round of the 1943 NFL draft by the Cleveland Rams. He played for the Los Angeles Rams (1946) and the Washington Redskins (1947–1948). He died in Iowa City in 1980, at the age of 59.
