= Merv Pregulman =

American football player (1922–2012)

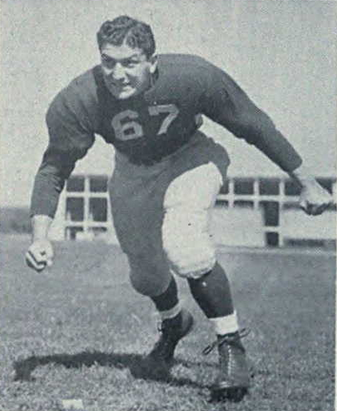
- Pregulman in 1948

No. 17, 67, 57, 61, 84
- Positions: Center, tackle

Personal information
- Born: October 10, 1922; Lansing, Michigan, U.S.
- Died: November 30, 2012 (aged 90); Chattanooga, Tennessee, U.S.
- Listed height: 6 ft 3 in (1.91 m)
- Listed weight: 215 lb (98 kg)

Career information
- College: Michigan
- NFL draft: 1944: 1st round, 7th overall pick

Career history
- Green Bay Packers (1946); Detroit Lions (1947–1948); New York Bulldogs (1949)

Awards and highlights
- 2× First-team All-American (1942, 1943); 3× Second-team All-Big Ten (1941, 1942, 1943)

Career NFL statistics
- Field goals made: 2
- Field goal attempts: 6
- Field goal %: 33.3
- Interceptions: 3
- Fumble recoveries: 4
- Stats at Pro Football Reference
- College Football Hall of Fame

Mervin Pregulman (October 10, 1922 – November 30, 2012) was an American football player, businessman, and philanthropist. He played college football as a tackle and center for the Michigan Wolverines from 1941 to 1943 and was selected as a first-team All-American in 1943. He was inducted into the United States Navy and served in the Pacific Theater during World War II, narrowly surviving a kamikaze attack on his ship in 1945.

Pregulman was a first-round draft pick (seventh overall pick) of the Green Bay Packers in the 1944 NFL draft. He played four years professionally with the Packers (1946), Detroit Lions (1947–48), and New York Bulldogs (1949).

He later became the president of Siskin Steel & Supply Co in Chattanooga, Tennessee. He was also active in philanthropy and community service, including service as president of the Siskin Foundation and a member of the University of Chattanooga Foundation's board of trustees. In 2004, he became the 13th recipient of the University of Michigan's Gerald R. Ford Award. He was also inducted into the College Football Hall of Fame in 1982.

== Childhood ==
Merv Pregulman was born on October 22, 1922, and raised in Lansing, Michigan. He was born with Jewish ancestry. His father, George Pregulman, had little formal education, but became a millionaire through his business ventures. Pregulman went to Lansing Central High School, which was close to the campus of Michigan State University (then known as Michigan State College of Agriculture and Applied Science). In his senior year of high school, Pregulman was "captain of the all-state football team".

== College football ==
Despite growing up and attending high school close to Michigan State, Pregulman chose to attend the University of Michigan. At Michigan, he played for Coach Fritz Crisler from 1941 to 1943. He was a versatile lineman who "moved from guard to tackle to center as needed, and who played each position with skill, confidence and winning effectiveness."

=== 1941 season ===
In 1941, Pregulman was a 19-year-old sophomore starting at right guard. On October 18, 1941, he intercepted a pass thrown by College and Pro Football Hall of Famer Otto Graham and ran it back 65 yards (59 m) for the game-winning touchdown in a 14–7 victory over Northwestern. That year, Pregulman was named a Grantland Rice All-American honorable mention and was given the team's Meyer Morton Award as the most improved player during spring drills. The 1941 Michigan team finished the year with a record of 6–1–1, outscored its opponents 147–41, and was ranked No. 5 in the final AP poll.

=== 1942 season ===
In 1942, the Michigan team was 7–3 and finished the season ranked No. 7 in the AP poll. Michigan played the Notre Dame Fighting Irish for the first time in 25 years and won, 32–20. Pregulman was named to the All Big Ten team. The 1942 Wolverines' offensive line that included Pregulman, Julius Franks (U-M's first African-American All-American), Al Wistert, Robert Kolesar, Bill Pritula and Elmer Madar, was known as the "Seven Oak Posts."

=== 1943 season ===
In 1943, the Michigan football team was 8–1, outscored its opponents, 302–73, and was co-champion of the Big Ten Conference, finishing the season ranked No. 3 in the final AP poll. The only loss was to Notre Dame, 35–12. The Wolverines did not allow any other opponent to score more than seven points that season and defeated Minnesota, 49–6, and Ohio State 45–7. For the 1943 season, Pregulman was named Grantland Rice first-team All-American at guard, UP All-American second-team at tackle, and AP All-American third-team at tackle.

=== Awards and accolades ===
His biography at the University of Michigan Athletic History site says: "Originally a center he was shifted to guard, then back to center where his accurate passes were a vital factor in Michigan's famed single-winged attack. Smart and aggressive, he never turned in a performance below the high standard he set for himself."

Sportswriter Grantland Rice wrote that Pregulman was "fast and alert … was voted the best combination center, guard, and tackle the Middlewest had known in years."

In addition to his father, Pregulman said he had three heroes in his life: Michigan Coach Fritz Crisler, Michigan's line coach (and future Michigan State head coach) Biggie Munn, and Axle Martin, a university professor.

In 1969, Pregulman was selected for the Michigan Wolverines' all-time football team. He was inducted into the College Football Hall of Fame in 1982 and the University of Michigan Hall of Honor in 1988. He was also part of the second group inducted into the Michigan Jewish Sports Hall of Fame in 1986.

In 2005, Pregulman was selected as one of the 100 greatest Michigan football players of all time by the "Motown Sports Revival," ranking 61st on the all-time team.

== Service in World War II ==
In 1944, Pregulman entered the United States Navy where he served as a gunnery officer on the USS Taluga in the Pacific Theater of Operations. The Taluga left Norfolk, Virginia, in October 1944. On December 10, 1944, the ship reached Ulithi, an atoll in the Caroline Islands in the western Pacific Ocean, which served as the ship's base of operations until the end of World War II. For the next 11 months, Pregulman and the Taluga crew were in and out of Ulithi picking up oil and other supplies and delivering them to units of the U.S. Pacific Fleet. During that time, they supported carrier strikes and landings on Luzon in the Philippine Islands, landings on Okinawa, strikes on Formosa, and the final sweep of the Japanese home islands in the summer of 1945. Between April and July 1945, Pregulman and the Taluga crew spent much of their time in and around the anchorage at Kerama Retto, just west of the southern end of Okinawa. At dawn on April 16, 1945, ten kamikazes attacked their formation. One of the kamikazes dove at Taluga, strafed the deck, and then made for the superstructure. The attacker careened off the ship's bridge and hit the wheelhouse. However, only 12 men were injured, and the oiler was soon back in action. Pregulman normally would have been in the wheelhouse, but he went on deck just before the attack. He recalled: "If he had been five minutes later, I would have been in the wheelhouse and I certainly wouldn't be here". He recalled that the plane sheared off the top of the wheelhouse, and blew a hole in the deck, but no American soldiers were killed.

Just 11 days after the cessation of hostilities, Taluga entered Tokyo Bay on August 26, 1945, and took up duty as station oiler until early October. On November 18, 1945, the ship left Japan to support ships engaged in the occupation of China and Korea. The ship visited Qingdao and Jinsen before returning to Yokosuka, Japan, on December 6, 1945. On January 31, 1946, the Taluga began its return to the United States, arriving in San Pedro, California, on February 16.

== Professional football ==
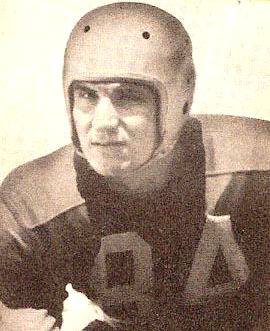
Merv Pregulman 1948 Bowman football card

=== Green Bay Packers ===
Pregulman was selected by the Green Bay Packers in the first round (seventh choice overall) of the 1944 NFL Draft, but was called into military service in the Navy. After completing his military service, Pregulman finally signed with the Packers in June 1946. A Wisconsin sports writer touted the signing: "Curly Lambeau came up with a dandy for the Green Bay Packers when he landed Merv Pregulman. … At Michigan he was a star at three different positions -- tackle, guard and center. I've a hunch that he would do just as well at end." Pregulman appeared in nine games for a Packers' team that had a 6–5 record in 1946.

=== Detroit Lions ===
During the spring of 1947, Pregulman joined the coaching staff of the Michigan State Spartans football team when Biggie Munn took over as head coach. Munn had been Pregulman's position coach at Michigan.

In June 1947, Pregulman was traded by the Packers to the Detroit Lions in exchange for his former teammate at Michigan, Paul White. Pregulman played in all 24 games for the Lions during the 1947 and 1948 seasons. The Lions went 3–9 in 1947 and 2–10 in 1948. Pregulman had three interceptions and recovered three fumbles for the Lions. He also handled the Lions' kicking duties in 1948, kicking two field goals in six attempts, and completing 26 extra points in 27 attempts. He also had a punt return for nine yards (eight m) in 1947.

=== New York Bulldogs ===
In August 1949, Pregulman was traded by the Lions to the New York Bulldogs in exchange for John Treadaway and John Prochlik. He played in all 12 games for the Bulldogs team that went 1–10–1.

In June 1950, Pregulman announced that he was retiring from football. He said he had received a contract to play for the Philadelphia Eagles, but had decided to remain in Lansing, Michigan, where he was in the furniture business.

== Business career ==
After his football career ended, Pregulman initially went into the furniture business.

In 1957, Pregulman moved with his wife Helen to her hometown, Chattanooga, Tennessee. His wife was the granddaughter of Robert Hyman Siskin, the founder of Siskin Steel & Supply Co. The company was started in 1900 by Siskin, a Lithuanian immigrant, as a small scrap metal business. His two sons, Mose and Garrison Siskin expanded the company into one of Chattanooga's leading businesses.

In 1978, when Mose Siskin died, Pregulman was named president and chief executive officer. In 1980, Siskin was generating about $50 million in annual revenues. Under Pregulman's management over the next 15 years the company's annual revenues tripled to $151 million, as the company expanded its operations throughout the Southeast. In 1985, Siskin bought Birmingham, Alabama-based Steel Supply Company, which subsequently took on the Siskin name. Next, Siskin built a 100,000-square-foot (9,300 m^{2}) steel service center in Nashville in 1989 to cut transportation costs and accommodate Nissan Motors and Saturn Corporation automobile plants in the area. When Pregulman retired, his son John Pregulman took over as the company's president.

In 1996, Siskin Steel was sold to Reliance Steel & Aluminum Co. for $71 million in cash. Under an agreement with Reliance Steel, the company remained under local management with Merv Pregulman continuing to serve as vice-chairman, and his son John Pregulman continuing as president. In 2002, John Pregulman left Siskin.

== Philanthropy and community service ==
Pregulman was also active in philanthropy and community service. For many years, he was the chairman of the Siskin Memorial Foundation and played a lead role in building the Siskin Hospital for Physical Rehabilitation, one of the leading rehabilitation centers in the United States. Even after he retired, he remained active as the Foundation's vice-chairman. He was also president of the Jewish Community Federation of Chattanooga, a member of the University of Chattanooga Foundation's board of trustees, and a leader at the University of Tennessee at Chattanooga and The McCallie School, a boy's preparatory school near his home in the Missionary Ridge section of Chattanooga. He also played an important role in raising money to build Finley Stadium, opened in 1997, and has served on the board of directors for the Finley Stadium/Davenport Field Corporation. Pregulmanparticularly active in community service efforts directed at improving health care and has received awards from the Tennessee Medical Association and the Chattanooga/Hamilton County Medical Society.

In 1997, Pregulman and his wife were given Chattanooga's top philanthropist honor at the 10th Annual National Philanthropy Day Luncheon and Award presentation, for their varied efforts since moving to Chattanooga in 1957. After his wife spoke, Pregulman told the attendees: "Helen (his wife) comes by charity work very honestly. When you talk about philanthropy and community there's no need to write them down on paper, the words come from the heart."

In 1998, Pregulman and his wife Helen (also a U-M graduate) endowed a scholarship at the University of Michigan. The Mervin and Helen S. Pregulman Endowed Scholarship Fund is awarded based on students' leadership ability, financial need, and commitment to work in the Jewish community after graduation. Pregulman said: "Helen and I are committed to Jewish communal service. We see it as essential to the health and vitality of the Jewish communities throughout the world. The students … will play an integral role in administration and related activities at synagogues and Jewish Community Centers in the future. We hope to encourage more leadership from our young adults through this scholarship program."

In 2004, Pregulman was the 13th person to receive the Gerald R. Ford Award. The award is the highest honor bestowed on a former University of Michigan athlete and is given for "excellence in scholarship, sport and society."

Pregulman was also a vocal opponent of efforts in 2005 to impose historic district zoning restrictions on the Missionary Ridge area of Chattanooga, where Pregulman lives. The ridge was the site of a Civil War battle and is listed in the National Register of Historic Places. Pregulman argued that historic zoning would limit the rights of property owners: "We live with enough restrictions. We don't need them."

A transcript of an interview with Pregulman is part of the American Jewish Committee Oral History Collection at the New York Public Library.

== See also ==
- University of Michigan Athletic Hall of Honor
- List of select Jewish football players
