= 1942 All-Big Ten Conference football team =

American college football all-star team

The 1942 All-Big Ten Conference football team consists of American football players selected to the All-Big Ten Conference teams selected by the Associated Press (AP) and United Press (UP) for the 1942 Big Ten Conference football season. Dave Schreiner was the only unanimous pick with 18 points (representing all nine first-team picks); Julius Franks and Dick Wildung followed with 17 points each.

== All Big-Ten selections ==
=== Ends ===
- Dave Schreiner, Wisconsin (AP-1, UP-1)
- Bob Shaw, Ohio State (AP-1, UP-1)
- Pete Pihos, Indiana (UP-2)
- Bill Parker, Iowa (UP-2)

=== Tackles ===
- Dick Wildung, Minnesota (AP-1, UP-1)
- Al Wistert, Michigan (AP-1, UP-1)
- Charles Csuri, Ohio State (UP-2)
- Paul Hirsbrunner, Wisconsin (UP-2)

=== Guards ===
- Julius Franks, Michigan (AP-1, UP-1)
- Lin Houston, Ohio State (AP-1, UP-1)
- Alex Agase, Illinois (UP-2)
- John Billman, Minnesota (UP-2)

=== Centers ===
- Fred Negus, Wisconsin (AP-1, UP-1)
- Merv Pregulman, Michigan (AP-2, UP-2)

=== Quarterbacks ===
- George Ceithaml, Michigan (AP-1, UP-1)
- Otto Graham, Northwestern (AP-2, UP-2)

=== Halfbacks ===
- Billy Hillenbrand, Indiana (AP-1, UP-1)
- Elroy Hirsch, Wisconsin (AP-1, UP-2)
- Paul Sarringhaus, Ohio State (AP-2, UP-1)
- Tom Farmer, Iowa (UP-2)
- Tom Kuzma, Michigan (AP-2)

=== Fullbacks ===
- Pat Harder, Wisconsin (AP-1, UP-1)
- Gene Fekete, Ohio State (UP-2)

== Key ==
AP = Associated Press, chosen by conference coaches

UP = United Press
