= Al Wistert =

American football player (1920–2016)

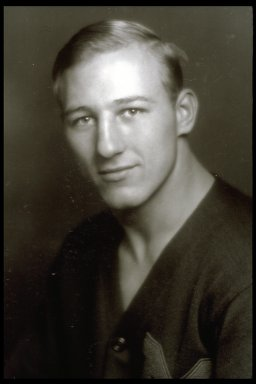

No. 70
- Position: Tackle

Personal information
- Born: December 28, 1920; Chicago, Illinois, U.S.
- Died: March 5, 2016 (aged 95); Grants Pass, Oregon, U.S.
- Listed height: 6 ft 1 in (1.85 m)
- Listed weight: 214 lb (97 kg)

Career information
- High school: Carl Schurz (Chicago)
- College: Michigan (1940–1942)
- NFL draft: 1943: 5th round, 32nd overall pick

Career history
- Steagles (1943); Philadelphia Eagles (1944–1951)

Awards and highlights
- 2× NFL champion (1948, 1949); 4× First-team All-Pro (1944–1947); Second-team All-Pro (1948); Pro Bowl (1950); NFL 1940s All-Decade Team; Philadelphia Eagles Hall of Fame; Philadelphia Eagles No. 70 retired; Consensus All-American (1942); Second-team All-American (1941); First-team All-Big Ten (1942); 2× Second-team All-Big Ten (1940, 1941); Michigan Wolverines No. 11 retired

Career NFL statistics
- Games played: 95
- Games started: 84
- Fumble recoveries: 8
- Stats at Pro Football Reference
- College Football Hall of Fame

Albert Alexander "Ox" Wistert (December 28, 1920 – March 5, 2016) was an American professional football player who was a tackle in the National Football League (NFL) for the Philadelphia Eagles. He played his entire nine-year NFL career for the Eagles and became their team captain. He was named to play in the NFL's first Pro Bowl as an Eagle. During most of Wistert's career there were no football All-star games, although he was named to the league All-Pro team four times.

Wistert played college football for the Michigan Wolverines. He is one of the three brothers—along with Whitey and Alvin—who were named All-American tackles at Michigan and later inducted into the College Football Hall of Fame. He was the first Michigan alumnus to be selected to the Pro Bowl. The Wistert brothers all wore jersey No. 11 at Michigan and are among the seven players who have had their numbers retired by the Michigan Wolverines football program. Their number will be put back into circulation starting on November 10, 2012, before a Michigan home game against the Northwestern Wildcats as part of the Michigan Football Legend program. The Legends program was discontinued in July 2015, and the numbers again permanently retired.

== Early life ==
Wistert, who was born in Chicago, Illinois, was from a Lithuanian family. His father, Kazimer Wistert, was a Spanish–American War veteran who was later killed in the line of duty while working for the Chicago Police Department. The story of the Wistert brothers at Michigan began when Whitey's Carl Schurz High School classmate John Kowalik was invited to visit the University of Michigan. At the time, Whitey Wistert had a factory job where he was involved with building Majestic radios. Kowalik took Whitey with him on his visit to Ann Arbor, and according to Alvin Wistert, "that's how it started: the Wisterts of Michigan."

== College football ==
And if I'm not mistaken I think this is unprecedented in the annals of college football: that three brothers all would go to the same school, all played football. All played tackle, all wore the same number 11, all made All-American. Two of us played on four national championship teams. And all were inducted into the College Football Hall of Fame. – Alvin Wistert

After graduating from Foreman High School, Wistert became the second of the Wistert brothers to play for Michigan where he wore number 11 like his brothers and played from 1940 to 1942. He was a consensus All-American and team MVP in 1942. He played in the 1943 East–West Shrine Game. He is well remembered, among other things, for his exploits in a 1942 game against the Notre Dame Fighting Irish football team, and he was inducted into the College Football Hall of Fame in 1968, one year after his brother Francis. In 1981, he was named to the University of Michigan Hall of Honor in the fourth class of inductees alongside his brothers. Only five Michigan football players earned this honor before him.

Michigan posted a 20–5–1 record during Wistert's three years on the team. In 1940, the team's only loss in its eight-game season was to the eventual national champion Minnesota Golden Gophers football. The Wolverines followed that season with 6–1–1 and 7–3 marks in the next two years. Wistert served as captain of the College All-star team that beat the Sammy Baugh-led National Football League champion Washington Redskins, 27–7, in Chicago. He was the only one of the three brothers not to play on a national championship squad at Michigan.

== Professional football ==
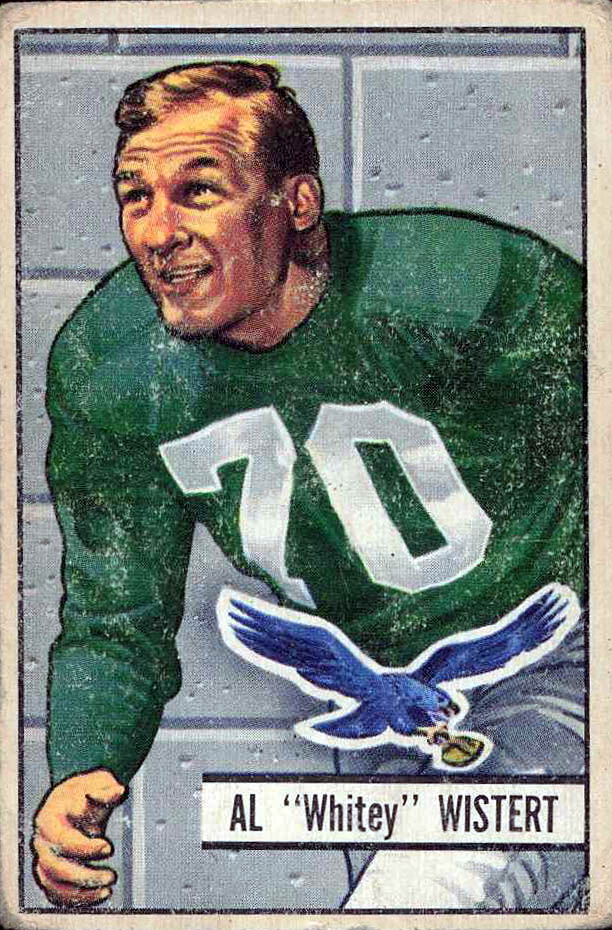
Wistert displayed on a Bowman card of 1951

After being drafted 32nd overall in the fifth round by the Philadelphia Eagles and signing for $3800 ($70,702 today), he encountered animosity from veteran players for having signed such a large contract (though they thought he signed for $4500). He earned All-Pro honors in eight (four by consensus) of his nine seasons. As a two-way player, he played his entire nine-year career for the Philadelphia Eagles (who operated as a merged team with the Pittsburgh Steelers for one season during World War II.) The National Football League had no All-Star games between 1943 and 1950. Thus, although Wistert was a perennial All-Pro selection, it is difficult to compare him to more modern players who are often measured by Pro Bowl invitations. He served as Eagles captain for five consecutive seasons, from 1946 to 1950, and was named All-Pro in each season. In Wistert's next to last season he was selected to the first Pro Bowl. In his final season, he recovered three fumbles. The Eagles won the 1948 and 1949 National Football League Championships with Wistert. These were the only consecutive National Football League champions to win by shutout. His number 70 was retired by the Eagles in 1952. According to his College Football Hall of Fame biography, during his career he started every game the Eagles played except for the 1950 season opener against the Cleveland Browns. However, according to other statistical databases he started 84 of his career 95 games. His jersey number is one of nine retired by the Eagles. In 2005, Wistert lamented not having been enshrined in the Professional Football Hall of Fame and on Philadelphia Eagles Honor Roll:

The two things that would really make my career complete is to be inducted into both the Pro Football Hall of Fame and the Philadelphia Eagles Honor Roll.

Wistert was inducted into the Philadelphia Eagles Honor Roll on September 29, 2009, along with Randall Cunningham. In 2003, he was named to the Pro Football Researchers Association Hall of Very Good in the association's inaugural HOVG class; he is one of two players that the Association officially supports for induction into the Pro Football Hall of Fame. He was named as a senior finalist for the class of 2020's "blue ribbon panel" but also missed out. In 2023, he was named as a senior semifinalist for the class of 2024.

== Later life and family ==
After football, Wistert became a successful life insurance salesman. He sold insurance for 40 years. Among the places he has lived since retirement are California and Grants Pass, Oregon. He was married to his late wife Ellie for 61 years and has three daughters (Pam, Dianna and Kathy) and three grandchildren. At one point he was both coaching football at Riverside High School in Riverside Township, New Jersey and playing professionally. According to brother Alvin, their father "was born Casmir Vistertus and he Anglicized it when he came to America to Wistert."

Wistert died on March 5, 2016, in Grants Pass, Oregon at the age of 95.

== See also ==
- List of Michigan Wolverines football All-Americans
- University of Michigan Athletic Hall of Honor

== Sources ==
- Algeo, Matthew (2007). Last Team Standing: How the Pittsburgh Steelers and the Philadelphia Eagles—'The Steagles'—Saved Pro Football During World War II. Da Capo Press. ISBN 978-0-306-81576-8.
