= 1942 Oklahoma Sooners football team =

American college football season

1942 Oklahoma Sooners football
- Conference: Big Six Conference
- Record: 3–5–2 (3–1–1 Big 6)
- Head coach: Dewey Luster (2nd season)
- Captains: Bill Campbell; Walter Lamb
- Home stadium: Memorial Stadium

1942 Big Six Conference football standings
	Conf.					Overall
Team	W		L		T	W		L		T
Missouri $	4	–	0	–	1	8	–	3	–	1
Oklahoma	3	–	1	–	1	3	–	5	–	2
Nebraska	3	–	2	–	0	3	–	7	–	0
Kansas State	2	–	3	–	0	3	–	8	–	0
Iowa State	1	–	4	–	0	3	–	6	–	0
Kansas	1	–	4	–	0	2	–	8	–	0
$ – Conference champion

The 1942 Oklahoma Sooners football team represented the University of Oklahoma in the 1942 college football season. In their second year under head coach Dewey Luster, the Sooners compiled a 3–5–2 record (3–1–1 against conference opponents), finished in second place in the Big Six Conference, and outscored their opponents by a combined total of 135 to 78.

No Sooners received All-America honors in 1942, but six Sooners received all-conference honors: William Campbell (back), Huel Hamm (back), Jack Marsee (center), Clare Morford (guard), W.G. Lamb (end), and Homer Simmons (tackle).

Oklahoma was ranked at No. 52 (out of 590 college and military teams) in the final rankings under the Litkenhous Difference by Score System for 1942.

== Schedule ==
Date	Opponent	Site	Result	Attendance	Source
September 26	at Oklahoma A&M*	Lewis Field; Stillwater, OK (Bedlam)	T 0–0	13,000	
October 3	at Tulsa*	Skelly Field; Tulsa, OK	L 0–23	12,000	
October 10	vs. Texas*	Cotton Bowl; Dallas, TX (rivalry)	L 0–7	20,000	
October 17	at Kansas	Memorial Stadium; Lawrence, KS	W 25–0	4,000	
October 24	Nebraska	Memorial Stadium; Norman, OK (rivalry)	L 0–7		
October 31	at Iowa State	Clyde Williams Stadium; Ames, IA	W 14–7	7,720	
November 7	Kansas State	Memorial Stadium; Norman, OK	W 76–0	8,000	
November 14	Missouri	Memorial Stadium; Norman, OK (Tiger–Sooner Peace Pipe)	T 6–6	20,000	
November 21	at Temple*	Temple Stadium; Philadelphia, PA	L 7–14	5,000	
November 28	No. 19 William & Mary*	Memorial Stadium; Norman, OK	L 7–14	5,000	
*Non-conference game; Rankings from AP Poll released prior to the game

== NFL draft ==
The following players were drafted into the National Football League following the season.

Round	Pick	Player	Position	NFL team
10	85	Homer Simmons	Tackle	Cleveland Rams
10	89	Dub Lamb	End	Chicago Bears
17	153	Bill Campbell	Back	Chicago Cardinals
25	231	Huel Hamm	Back	Detroit Lions
