= 1942 Pittsburgh Panthers football team =

American college football season

1942 Pittsburgh Panthers football
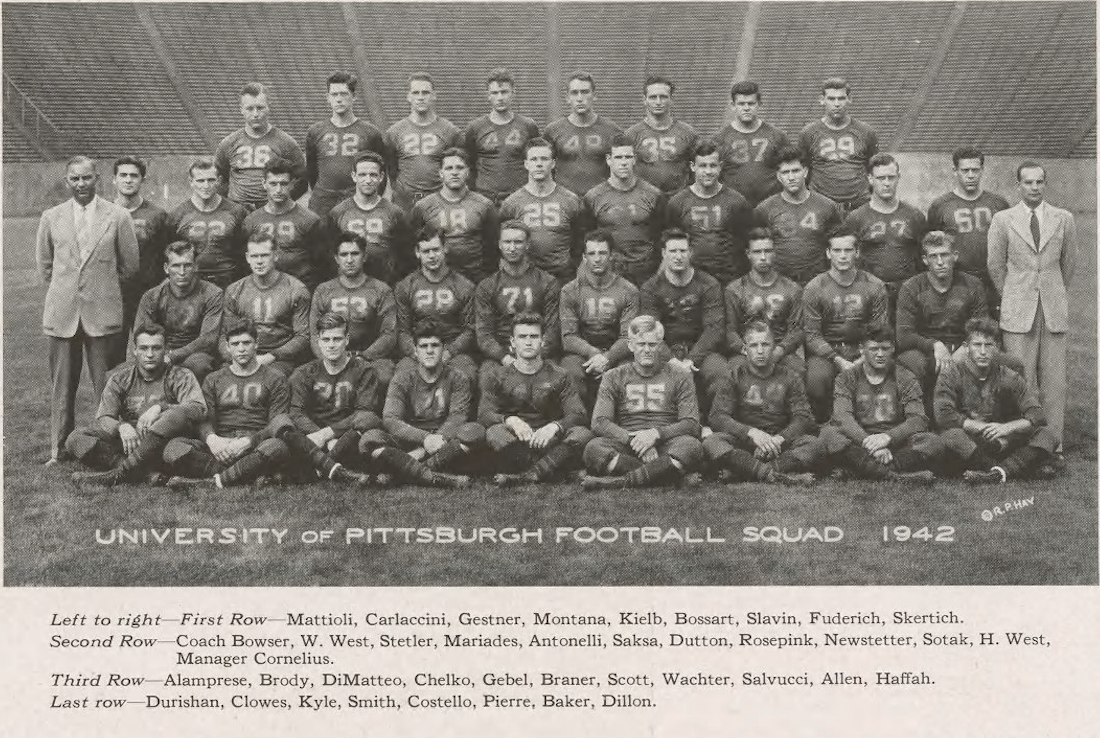
- Conference: Independent
- Record: 3–6
- Head coach: Charley Bowser (4th season)
- Home stadium: Pitt Stadium

1942 Eastern college football independents records
	Conf.			Overall
Team	W	L	T	W		L		T
Williams		–		7	–	1	–	0
No. 19 Penn State		–		6	–	1	–	1
No. 8 Boston College		–		8	–	2	–	0
Buffalo		–		6	–	2	–	0
Bucknell		–		6	–	2	–	1
Colgate		–		6	–	2	–	1
Army		–		6	–	3	–	0
Syracuse		–		6	–	3	–	0
Duquesne		–		6	–	3	–	1
Yale		–		5	–	3	–	0
Fordham		–		5	–	3	–	1
Penn		–		5	–	3	–	1
No. T–19 Holy Cross		–		5	–	4	–	1
Dartmouth		–		5	–	4	–	0
Brown		–		4	–	4	–	0
Villanova		–		4	–	4	–	0
Vermont		–		4	–	3	–	0
Carnegie Tech		–		3	–	3	–	0
Boston University		–		4	–	5	–	0
Cornell		–		3	–	5	–	1
Princeton		–		3	–	5	–	1
Temple		–		2	–	5	–	3
Columbia		–		3	–	6	–	0
Pittsburgh		–		3	–	6	–	0
Tufts		–		2	–	5	–	1
Franklin & Marshall		–		1	–	4	–	2
Massachusetts State		–		2	–	5	–	0
Harvard		–		2	–	6	–	1
Manhattan		–		2	–	6	–	0
CCNY		–		1	–	7	–	1
Rankings from AP Poll

The 1942 Pittsburgh Panthers football team represented the University of Pittsburgh as an independent during the 1942 college football season. The team compiled a 3–6 record under head coach Charley Bowser.

Pitt was ranked at No. 80 (out of 590 college and military teams) in the final rankings under the Litkenhous Difference by Score System for 1942.

== Schedule ==
Date	Opponent	Site	Result	Attendance	Source
September 26	at Minnesota	Memorial Stadium; Minneapolis, MN	L 7–50	22,000	
October 3	SMU	Pitt Stadium; Pittsburgh, PA	W 20–7	15,000	
October 10	vs. Great Lakes Navy	Cleveland Municipal Stadium; Cleveland, OH	L 6–7	12,315	
October 17	Indiana	Pitt Stadium; Pittsburgh, PA	L 7–19	20,000	
October 24	Duke	Pitt Stadium; Pittsburgh, PA	L 0–28	15,000–20,000	
October 31	Carnegie Tech	Pitt Stadium; Pittsburgh, PA	W 19–6	5,000–7,500	
November 7	at No. 6 Ohio State	Ohio Stadium; Columbus, OH	L 19–59	34,893	
November 14	Nebraska	Pitt Stadium; Pittsburgh, PA	W 6–0	6,000–7,000	
November 21	at Penn State	New Beaver Field; State College, PA (rivalry)	L 6–14	11,710–12,000	
Rankings from AP Poll released prior to the game

== Preseason ==
The war effort caused uncertainty for Coach Bowser with his staff and roster. Bowser hired Forest Evashevski, former Michigan halfback, who had been the head coach at Hamilton College the previous season, to replace Harold Stebbins and Dr. Arnold Greene, both of whom resigned from their assistant coaching positions for business reasons. Evashevski lasted through the spring training period and then he enlisted in the Iowa Naval Pre-Flight School. Four sophomores expected to play on the varsity had already enlisted in the armed forces – Glen McCurdy, Harry Kozic, Charles Surina and Dick Stitt. Bowser's fourth spring practice session opened on March 16. On April 25, as part of a baseball/football doubleheader at the stadium, the Blues beat the Whites in the final intrasquad game 20 to 0. Halfback Jack Stetler scored all 3 touchdowns.

On September 2, twenty-two Panthers, who were enrolled in the third trimester, started fall practice. The remainder of the squad, another twenty men, joined practice the following week. Coach Bowser was honest: “I don't know what kind of season we will have but I am hoping for the best. I don't know if all the boys we are expecting will be on hand, but if they are we should have a pretty fair team. Of course, our schedule is such that we can't hope for too much success.”

== Coaching staff ==
1942 Pittsburgh Panthers football staff
Coaching staff: Charley Bowser – Head coach; Robert Hoel – Assistant coach; Charles Hartwig – assistant coach; John Dickinson – assistant coach; Nick Kliskey– freshman coach	Support staff: Dr. H. A. Ralph Shanor – team physician; Bill Smith – football trainer; Harold Whitson – varsity equipment manager; James Hagan - director of athletics; Frank Carver – publicity director; Edward Cornelius – varsity student manager

== Roster ==
1942 Pittsburgh Panthers football roster
Player	Position	Games	Height	Weight	Class	Prep School	Hometown
Louis Alamprese	halfback	0	5 ft 10 in	165	1945	Altoona H. S.	Altoona, PA
Bruce Allen	tackle	3	5 ft 11 in	210	1945	Schenley H. S.	Pittsburgh, PA
George Allshouse*	center	8	5 ft 10 in	188	1942	Duquesne H. S.	Duquesne, PA
Vincent Antonelli*	guard	9	5 ft 10 in	183	1943	Schenley H. S.	Pittsburgh, PA
John Baker*	tackle	9	6 ft	205	1945	Coatesville H. S.	Coatesville, PA
Loren Braner	center	1	6 ft 2 in	195	1945	Lancaster H. S.	Lancaster, PA
Joseph Brody	end	1	5 ft 11 in	175	1943	Latrobe H. S.	Latrobe, PA
Joseph Broudy	guard	0	6 ft	190	1944	Peabody H. S.	Pittsburgh, PA
Wendell Bossart	guard	0	6 ft	190	1944	Arona H. S.	Arona, PA
Angelo Carlaccini*	halfback	4	5 ft 10 in	165	1945	Tarentum H. S.	Tarentum, PA
Louis Chelko*	halfback	4	5 ft 10 in	192	1965	Har-Brack H. S.	Har-Brack, PA
James Clowes*	center	9	6 ft 1 in	195	1944	Har-Brack H. S.	Tarentum, PA
Robert Costello*	tackle	5	6 ft 1 in	195	1944	Schenley H. S.	Pittsburgh, PA
William Dillon*	guard	8	6 ft	190	1944	Trinity H. S.	Marianna, PA
Tony DiMatteo*	halfback	8	5 ft 11 in	180	1945	Perry H. S.	Pittsburgh, PA
Jack Durishan*	tackle	9	6 ft	220	1944	Hazleton H. S.	Hazleton, PA
William Dutton*	halfback	9	5 ft 10 in	175	1943	Weston H. S.	Weston, WV
Pete Fuderich	quarterback	0	5 ft 7 in	165	1945	Aliquippa H. S.	Aliquippa, PA
Matthew Gebel*	halfback	4	6 ft 1 in	185	1944	East Pittsburgh H. S.	East Pittsburgh, PA
Norbert Gestner*	end	3	6 ft 2 in	165	1944	Tarentum H. S.	Tarentum, PA
Joe Kielb	halfback	0	5 ft 10 in	170	1945		Pittsburgh, PA
William Kyle*	end	8	6 ft	190	1945	Wilkinsburg H. S.	Wilkinsburg, PA
William Lohmeyer	end	0	6 ft 3 in	195	1943	Central Catholic H. S.	Pittsburgh, PA
James Mariades	guard	2	5 ft 10 in	185	1944	Groveton H. S.	Groveton, PA
Francis Mattioli*	guard	9	5 ft 10 in	190	1945	Kiski H. S.	Har-Brack, PA
John Montana*	fullback	1	5 ft 10in	175	1945	Meadville H. S.	Meadville, PA
Ned Naffah	end	0		160	1944		Pittsburgh, PA
Wilbur Newsstetter*	guard	2	5 ft 9 in	165	1945		Pittsburgh, PA
Joe Pierre	end	3	6 ft	180	1944	Windber H. S.	Windber, PA
Martin Rosepink*	end	7	6 ft 1 in	200	1944	Verona H. S.	Verona, PA
Frank Saksa*	halfback	9	6 ft	182	1943	Braddock H. S.	Braddock, PA
Joe Salvucci*	tackle	6	6 ft 1 in	210	1944	Peabody H. S.	Pittsburgh, PA
Charles Schwartz	tackle	0	6 ft	185	1945	Glenshaw H. S.	Glenshaw, PA
Howard Scott	end	1	6 ft	190	1945		Pittsburgh, PA
William Skertich	halfback	0	5 ft 9 in	170	1945	Etna H. S.	Etna, PA
Joe Skladaney	halfback	0	6 ft	180	1944	Larksville H. S.	Larksville, PA
Ed Slavin	quarterback	0	5 ft 9 in	170	1945	Duquesne H. S.	Duquesne, PA
Robert Smith*	quarterback	8	6 ft 1 in	190	1945	Tarentum H. S.	Tarentum, PA
Michael Sotack*	end	9	5 ft 8 in	180	1944	Hazleton H. S.	Hazleton, PA
Jack Stetler*	halfback	9	5 ft 10' in	180	1941	Glenshaw H. S.	Glenshaw, PA
William Wachter	guard	1	6 ft 1 in	190	1945	Beaver H. S.	Beaver, PA
Walter West*	quarterback	9	6 ft	190	1945	Burgettstown H. S.	Atlasburg, PA
Henry West*	end	5	6 ft	180	1945	Burgettstown H. S.	Atlasburg, PA
Edward Cornelius*	student manager				1943		
* Letterman

== Game summaries ==
=== At Minnesota ===
Week 1: Pitt at Minnesota

Team	1	2	3	4	Total
Pitt	7	0	0	0	7
• Minnesota	20	3	13	14	50

- Date: September 26, 1942
- Location: Memorial Stadium (University of Minnesota)
  Minneapolis, MN
- Game start: 2:30 p.m.
- Game attendance: 22,000
- Game weather: cold
- Referee: Harry O. Dayhoff (Bucknell)

The Panthers opened the season against the Minnesota Gophers. Pitt was 0–3 against the Gophers and had been outscored 59–10. The Gophers were coached by George Hauser, who was appointed when Bernie Bierman was called to active duty by the U. S. Marine Corps reserve. The Gophers were the reigning Associated Press 1940 and 1941 National Champions and owned a 17-game win streak. All-Americans - halfback Bill Daley and tackle Dick Wildung – were the team leaders.

On the eve of the Panthers trip to Minneapolis, second-string quarterback Pete Fuderich dropped out of school to work in a defense plant. Coach Bowser had 9 lettermen but only one returning starter, in the starting lineup. The Panthers were decided underdogs at 5–1 odds.

Minnesota romped over the Panthers 50–7 to run their winning streak to 18 games. The Gophers scored in 3 plays on a 19-yard scamper by Bill Daley. Pitt answered with a 98-yard kick-off return by Tony DiMatteo to tie the score. Minnesota dominated the remainder of the game. Daley scored 3 more touchdowns. Herman Frickey, Dick Kelly and Charles Sandberg each scored one. Vic Kulbiski tacked on a 21-yard field goal and Bill Garnaas (3), Bob Kula (1) and Joe Slovich (1) converted extra points. The Gophers finished the season with a 5–4 record.

This was the worst defeat for the Panthers since the 1903 season when they lost to Geneva 57–0 and Penn State 59–0. Eddie Beachler of The Pittsburgh Press summarized: "The Panthers have been in a steady decline since being upset by Duquesne in mid-season of 1939, showing only occasional flashes of major league football, and all the while their schedules have grown not one bit softer."

The Pitt starting lineup for the game against Minnesota was Norbert Gestner (left end), Jack Durishan (left tackle), William Dillon (left guard), George Allshouse (center), Vince Antonelli (right guard), Joe Salvucci (right tackle), William Kyle (right end), Walter West (quarterback), Tony DiMatteo (left halfback), Jack Stetler (right halfback) and Frank Saksa (fullback). Substitutes appearing in the game for Pitt were William Dutton, Mike Sotack, Loren Braner, Francis Mattioli, James Clowes, Joe Pierre, John Baker, Angelo Carlaccini, Robert Smith, Robert Costello and Ed Slavin.

Scoring summary

Quarter	Time	Drive			Team	Scoring information	Score	
Quarter	Time	Plays	Yards	TOP	Team	Scoring information	Pittsburgh	Minnesota
1		3	38		Minnesota	Bill Daley 29-yard touchdown run, Bill Garnaas kick good	0	7
1		1	98		Pittsburgh	Kickoff returned 98 yards for touchdown by Tony DiMatteo, Walter West kick good	7	7
1		6	68		Minnesota	BIll Daley 56-yard touchdown run, Bill Garnaas kick no good	7	13
1		7	17		Minnesota	Herman Frickey 1-yard touchdown run, Bill Garnaas kick good	7	20
2		4	0		Minnesota	21-yard field goal by Vic Kulbitski	7	23
3		8	65		Minnesota	Bill Daley 8-yard touchdown run, Bill Garnaas kick no good	7	29
3		7	33		Minnesota	Bill Daley 6-yard touchdown run, Bill Garnaas kick good	7	36
4		2	62		Minnesota	Dick Kelly 23-yard touchdown run, Bob Kula kick good	7	43
4		1	15		Minnesota	Charles Sandberg 15-yard touchdown reception from Joe Slovich, Joe Slovich kick good	7	50
"TOP" = time of possession. For other American football terms, see Glossary of American football.							7	50

=== SMU ===
Week 2: SMU at Pitt

Team	1	2	3	4	Total
SMU	0	0	0	7	7
• Pitt	7	0	13	0	20

- Date: October 3, 1942
- Location: Pitt Stadium
  Pittsburgh, PA
- Game start: 2:00 p.m.
- Game attendance: 15,000
- Game weather: warm and dry
- Referee: F. X. Keating (Fitchburg)

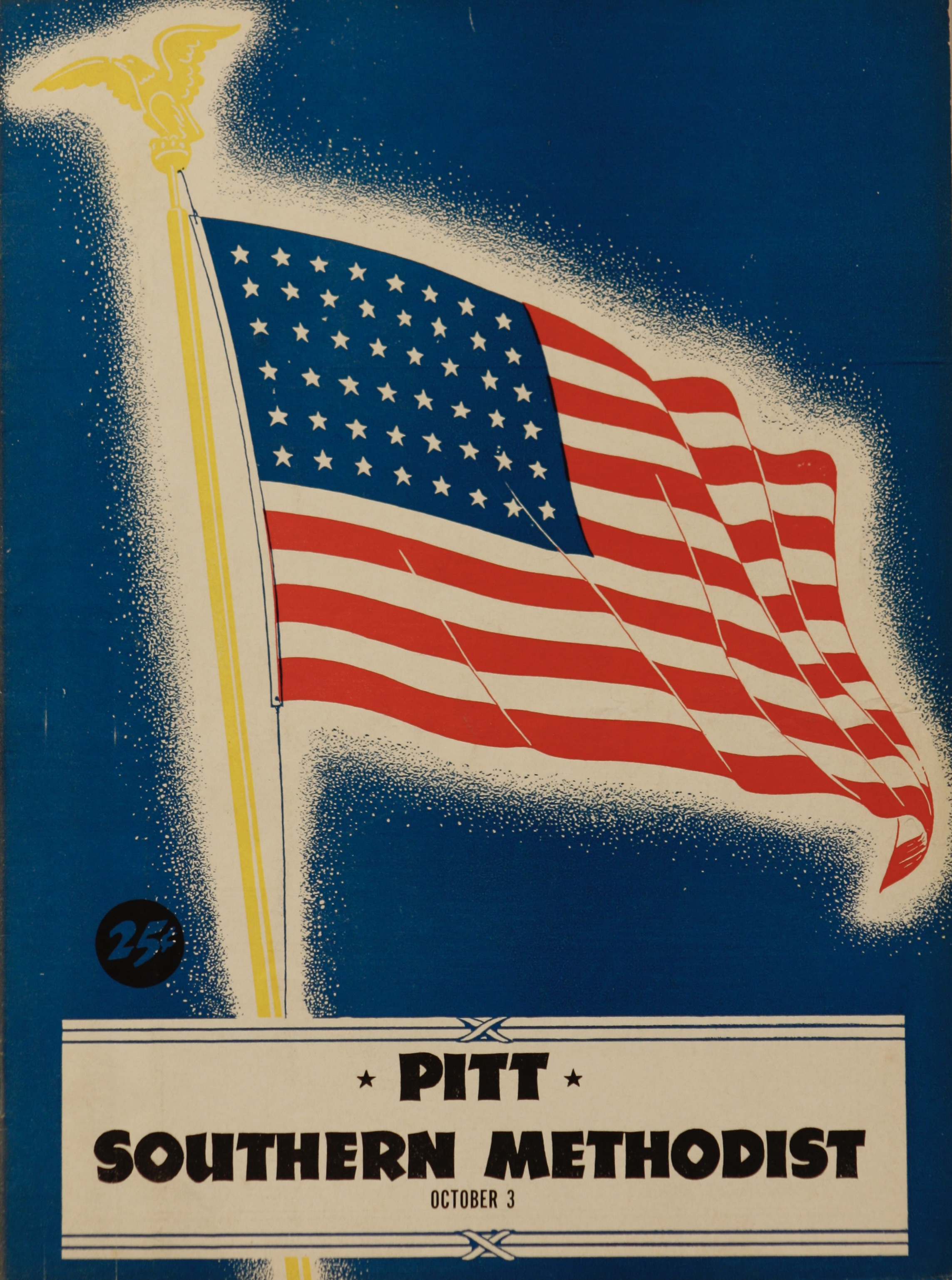
Program for the October 3 game versus SMU

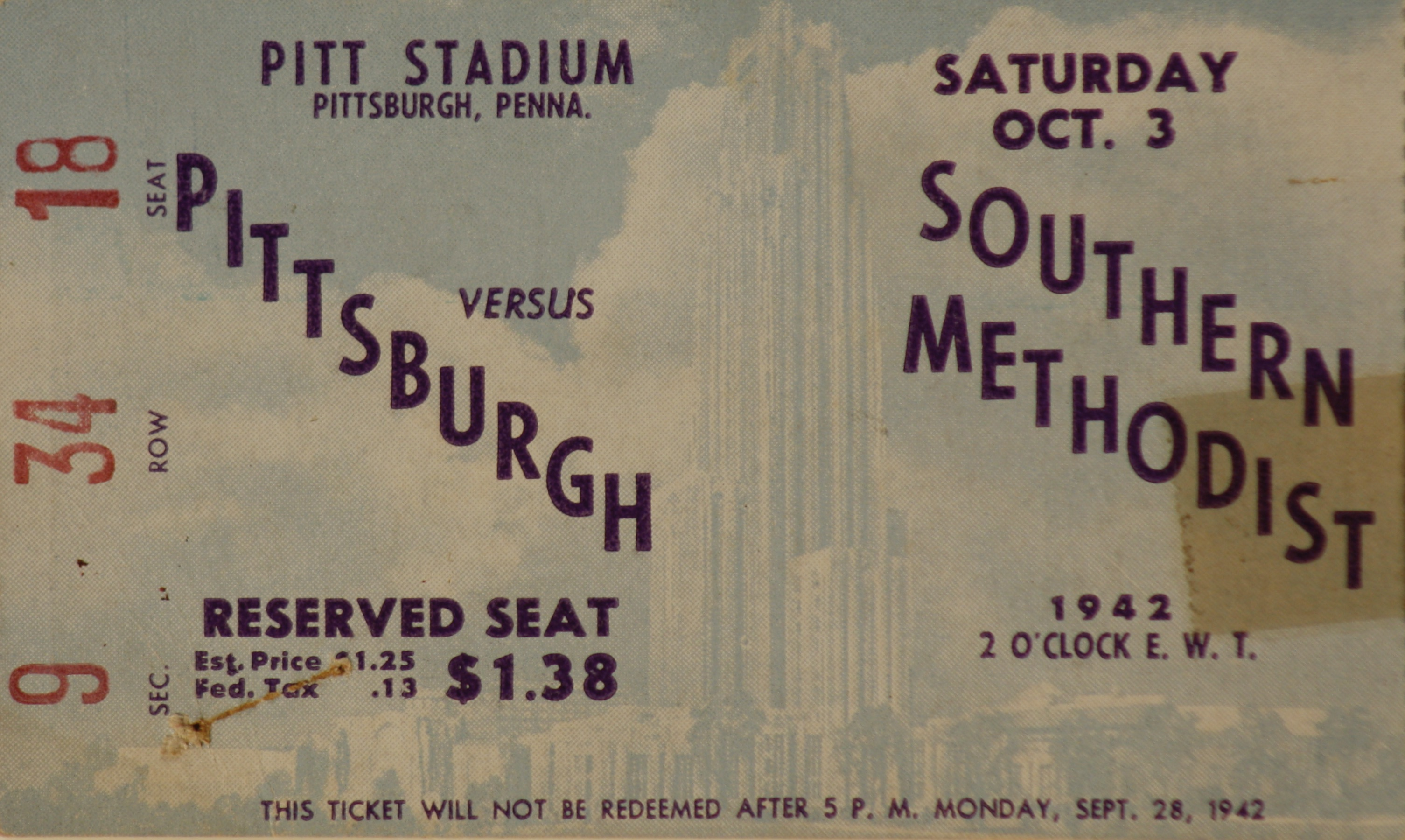
Ticket stub for October 3 game versus SMU

On October 3, the Panthers hosted the SMU Mustangs for the third time. Pitt won the 1938 contest 34–7 and the 1940 matchup ended in a 7–7 tie.

After SMU head coach Matty Bell joined the Navy, James Stewart, their business manager, was appointed head coach. The Mustangs opened their season with a 26–7 victory over North Texas State. Their star running back, Carroll Parker, was injured during the game and was unable to make the trip to Pittsburgh.

The Panthers were healthy. Bowser started the same lineup that faced Minnesota except that William Dutton replaced Tony DiMatteo at left halfback.

The Panthers rebounded from the previous week's debacle with a 20–7 victory over the visiting Mustangs. Panther quarterback Walter West returned the opening kick-off 57 yards to the SMU 36-yard line. Five rushes advanced the ball to the 4-yard line. William Dutton scooted through tackle for the touchdown. Walter West added the point after and Pitt led 7–0. The Panthers played most of the second quarter in SMU territory, but a fumble and penalties thwarted their drives. Early in the second half the Panthers gained possession on the Mustangs 46-yard line. Pitt completed 3 straight passes for their second touchdown. The touchdown toss was 19-yards from William Dutton to Frank Saksa. Jack Durishan's placement attempt was blocked. The Panthers scored later in the third period on a 3-yard scamper by Tony DiMatteo to end a 7-play, 53-yard drive. West kicked the extra point and Pitt led 20–0. The Mustangs scored late in the fourth quarter on a 6-yard touchdown pass from Wayne Shaw to Kelly Simpson. Jim Wright added the extra point.

Pitt led the series 2–0–1 and SMU finished their season with a 3–6–2 record.

The Pitt starting lineup for the game against SMU was Norbert Gestner (left end), Jack Durishan (left tackle), William Dillon (left guard), George Allshouse (center), Vince Antonelli (right guard), Joe Salvucci (right tackle), William Kyle (right end), Walter West (quarterback), William Dutton (left halfback), Jack Stetler (right halfback) and Frank Saksa (fullback). Substitutes appearing in the game for Pitt were Mike Sotack, Martin Rosepink, John Baker, Robert Costello, Francis Mattioli, James Clowes, William Dutton, Robert Smith and Tony DiMatteo.

Scoring summary

Quarter	Time	Drive			Team	Scoring information	Score	
Quarter	Time	Plays	Yards	TOP	Team	Scoring information	SMU	Pittsburgh
1		6	36		Pittsburgh	William Dutton 4-yard touchdown run, Walter West kick good	0	7
3		4	46		Pittsburgh	Frank Saksa 19-yard touchdown reception from William Dutton, Jack Durishan kick blocked	0	13
3		7	53		Pittsburgh	Tony DiMatteo 3-yard touchdown run, Walter West kick good	0	20
4		3	46		Pittsburgh	Kelly Simpson 6-yard touchdown reception from Wayne Shaw, Jim Wright kick good	7	20
"TOP" = time of possession. For other American football terms, see Glossary of American football.							7	20

=== At Great Lakes ===
Week 3: Pitt at Great Lakes

Team	1	2	3	4	Total
Pitt	0	6	0	0	6
• Great Lakes	0	0	0	7	7

- Date: October 10, 1942
- Location: Cleveland Municipal Stadium
  Cleveland, OH
- Game start: 2:00 p.m.
- Game attendance: 12,315
- Referee: Joseph H. Williams (Bucknell)

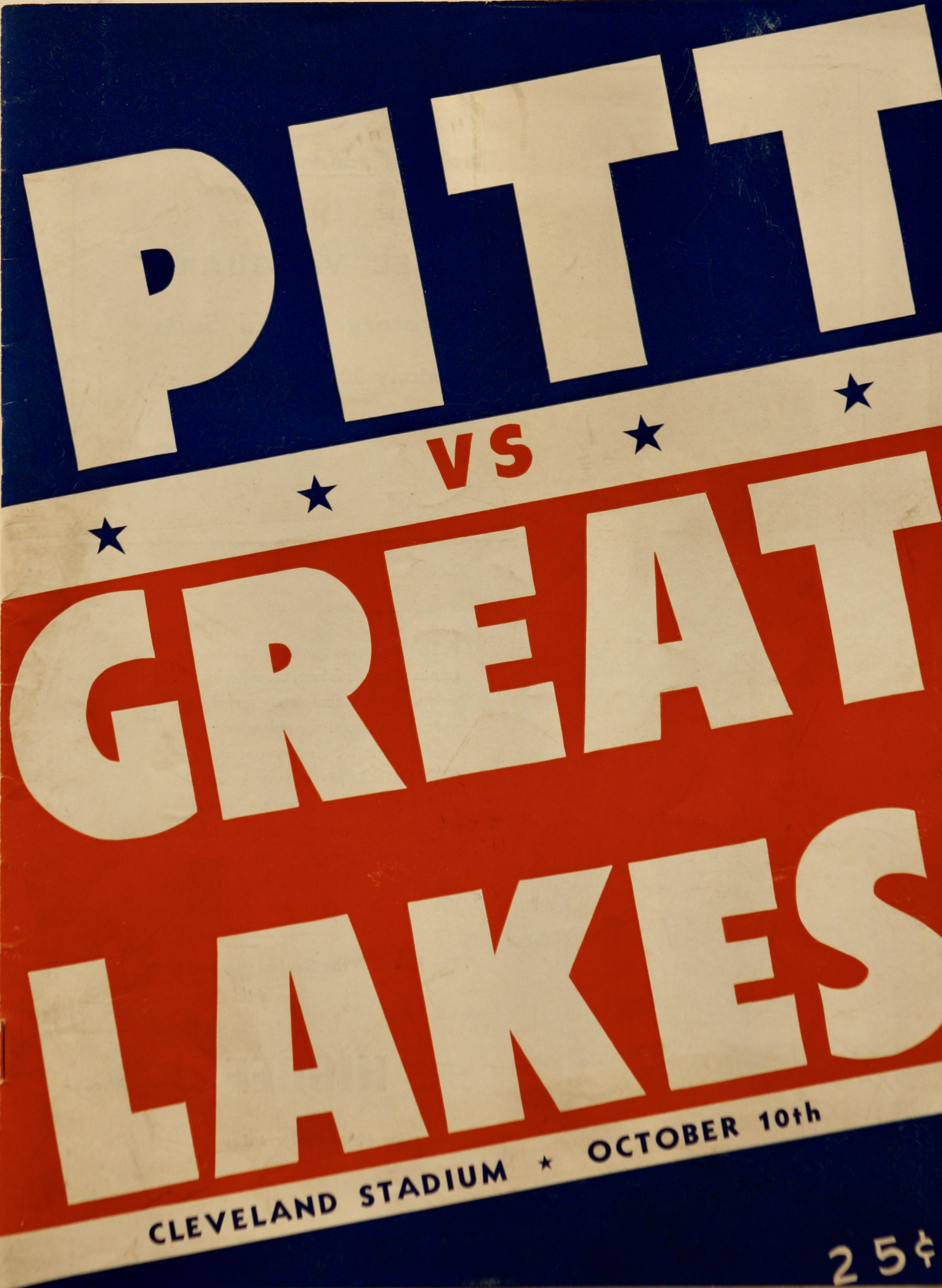
Program for October 10 game versus Great Lakes

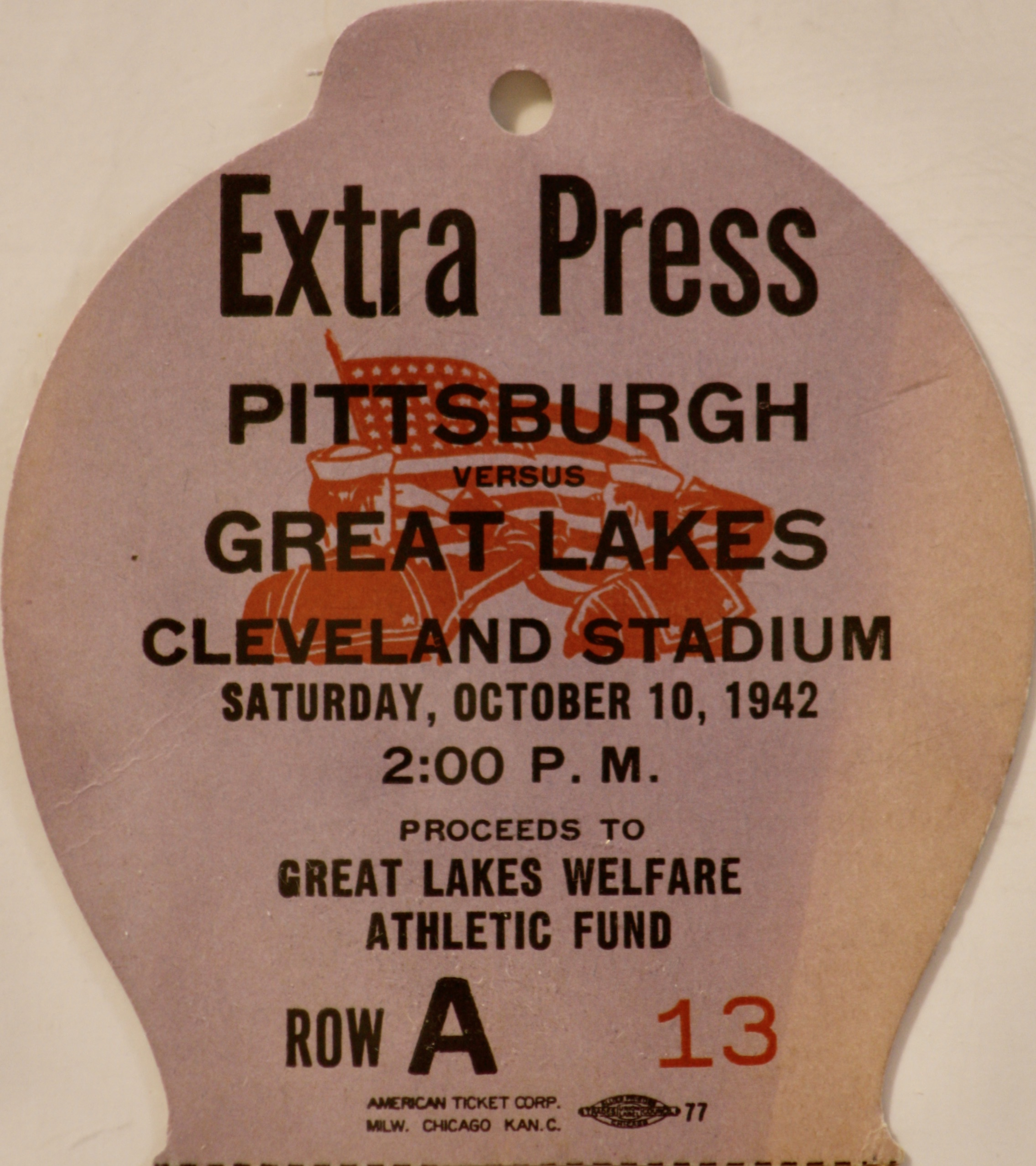
Press pass for October 10 game versus Great Lakes

The Panthers second road trip was to Cleveland, Ohio to play the Great Lakes Naval Training Station Bluejackets football team. The Bluejackets were coached by Butler University's head coach, Tony Hinkle. His roster was loaded with veteran college players. 1941 Heisman Trophy winner Bruce Smith was the starting halfback, and Steve Belichick, Bill Belichick's father, was a substitute halfback. The Bluejackets opened their season with a 9–0 loss to Michigan and then rebounded with a 25–0 shutout of Iowa. Great Lakes was heavily favored.

While the Pitt varsity traveled to Cleveland, the freshman squad, under the direction of baseball coach Ralph Mitterling, went to Annapolis to play the Navy Junior Varsity. The Panthers and Midshipmen played to a 6–6 tie.

In front of only 12,315 fans, in the 80,000 seat Cleveland Stadium, the Great Lakes eleven eked out a 7–6 victory over the Panthers. After a scoreless first period, Pitt gained possession on their own 37-yard line via a Jack Stetler interception. The Pitt offense engineered a 12-play, 63-yard drive that ended with William Dutton running through left tackle for a 9-yard touchdown. Walter West's placement was wide and Pitt led 6–0. The Bluejackets dominated the game statistically, but the Panthers held the lead into the fourth quarter. After an 11-yard punt return the Bluejackets were on the Panther 38-yard line. On first down John Popov gained 2 yards over center. On second down Bill Harrell connected with Steve Belichick for a 13-yard gain to the Pitt 23-yard line. Howard Hickey caught Harrell's next pass on the 13-yard line and ran into the end zone to tie the score. Bob Nelson's placement provided the winning margin. The Bluejackets earned 17 first downs to the Panthers 4, and they out-gained Pitt 336 yards to 79. The Panthers punted 10 times for an average of 53.6 yards, which helped keep the game close.

Coach Bowser praised his team's effort: "I couldn't have been more proud of them if they had won. They played their hearts out. We gave them all we had for three quarters, but their weight and power gradually wore us down....I've had a lot of fine football players in years gone by, but never have I had a team with the heart that this one possesses."

The Bluejackets finished the season with an 8–3–1 record.

The Pitt starting lineup for the game against Great Lakes was Norbert Gestner (left end), Jack Durishan (left tackle), William Dillon (left guard), George Allshouse (center), Vince Antonelli (right guard), Joe Salvucci (right tackle), William Kyle (right end), Walter West (quarterback), William Dutton (left halfback), Jack Stetler (right halfback) and Frank Saksa (fullback). Substitutes appearing in the game for Pitt were Mike Sotack, John Baker, Francis Mattioli, James Clowes and Tony DiMatteo.

Scoring summary

Quarter	Time	Drive			Team	Scoring information	Score	
Quarter	Time	Plays	Yards	TOP	Team	Scoring information	Pittsburgh	Great Lakes
2		12	63		Pittsburgh	William Dutton 9-yard touchdown run, Walter West kick no good, wide	6	0
4		3	38		Great Lakes	Howard Hickey 23-yard touchdown reception from Bill Harrell, Bob Nelson kick good	6	7
"TOP" = time of possession. For other American football terms, see Glossary of American football.							6	7

=== Indiana ===
Week 4: Indiana at Pitt

Team	1	2	3	4	Total
• Indiana	7	6	6	0	19
Pitt	0	7	0	0	7

- Date: October 17, 1942
- Location: Pitt Stadium
  Pittsburgh, PA
- Game start: 2:00 p.m.
- Game attendance: 20,000
- Game weather: warm and dry
- Referee: Russell Rupp

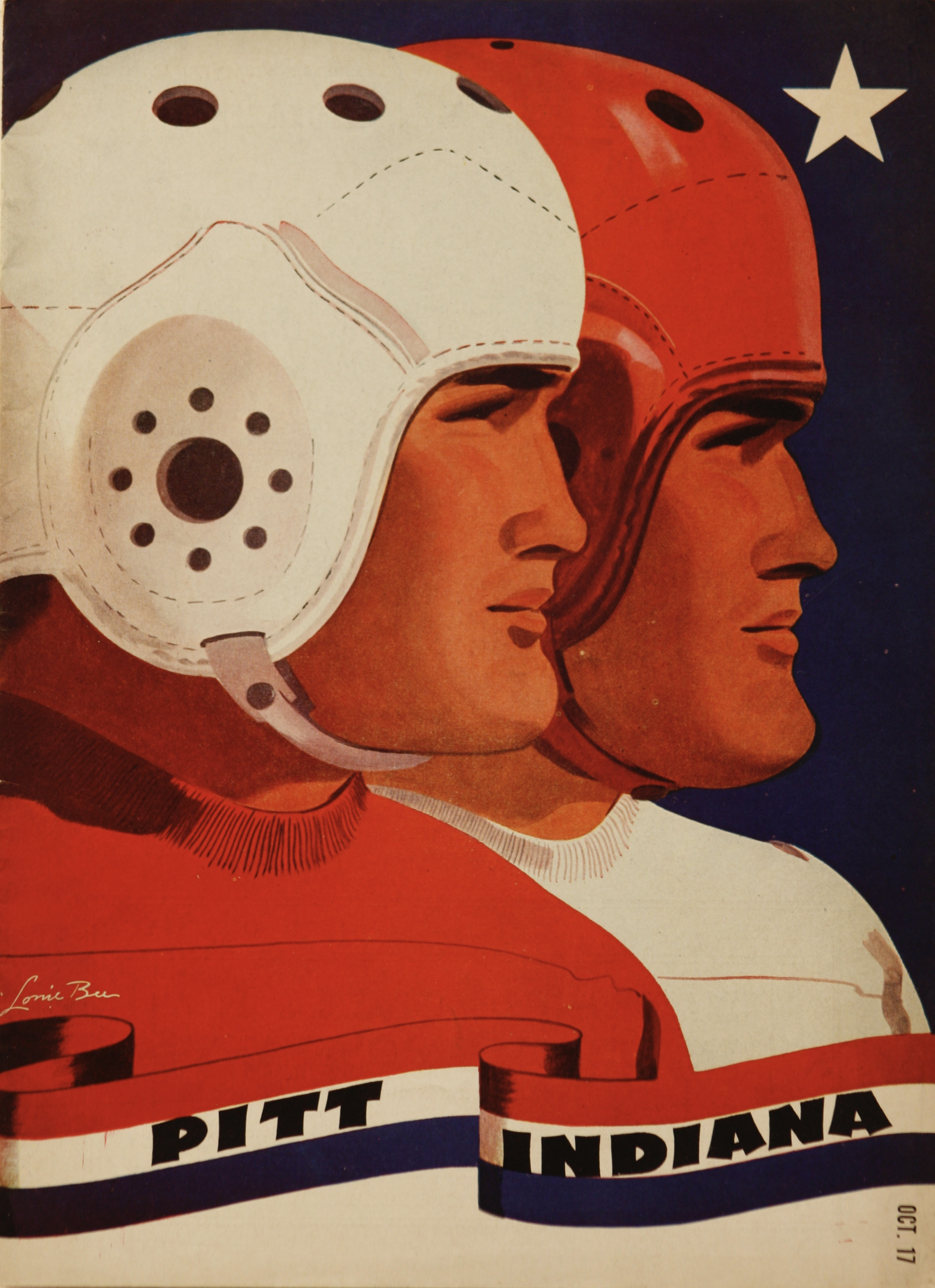
Program for October 17 game versus Indiana

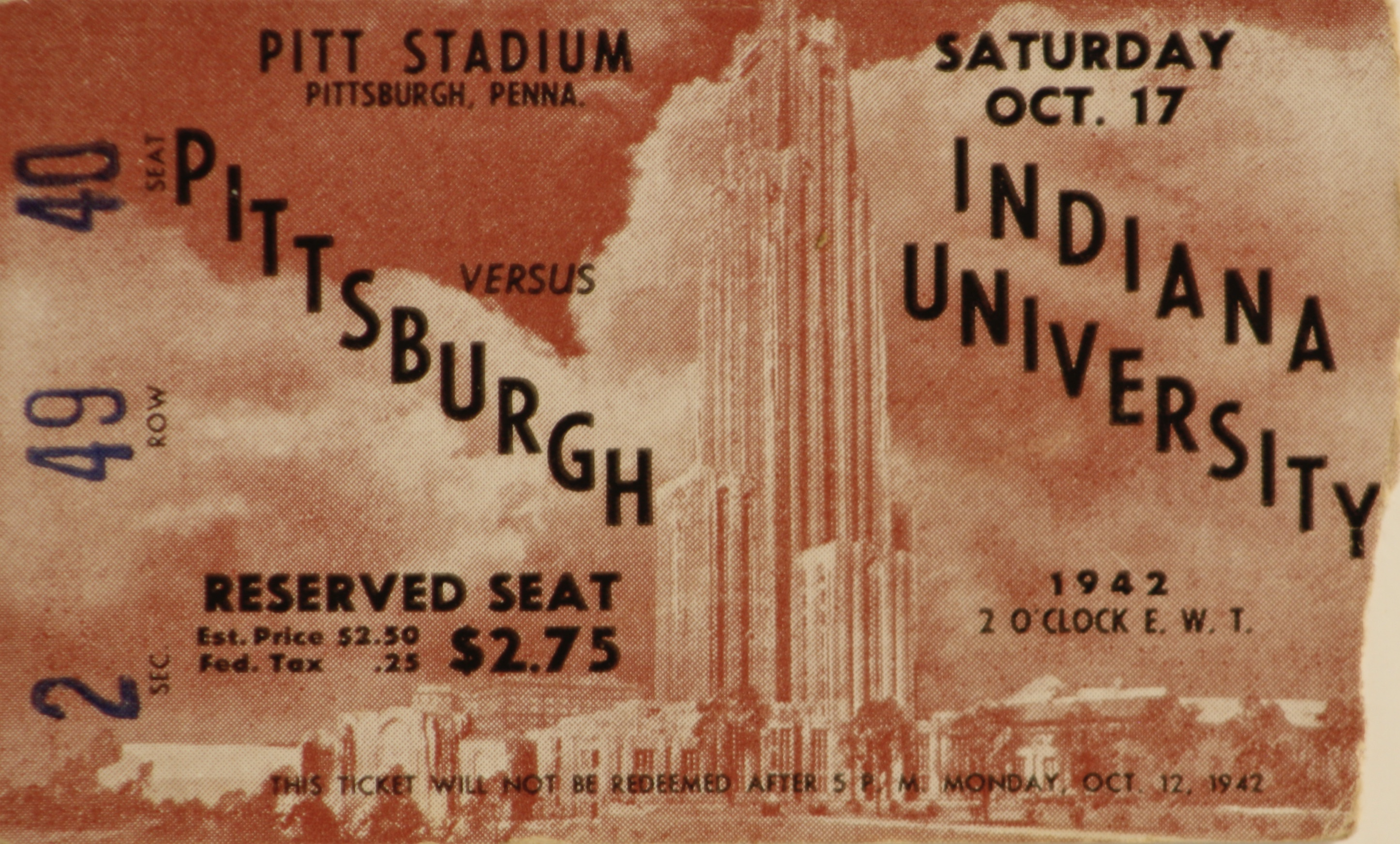
Stub for the October 17 game versus Indiana

On October 17, the Panthers hosted the Indiana Hoosiers for the first time. This was Pitt's eighth game against the Big Ten and they were winless in the previous seven. Ninth-year coach Bo McMillin brought his touchdown-favored squad to Pittsburgh with a 2–1 record. Indiana beat Butler (53–0) and Nebraska (12–0) and lost to eventual AP National Champion Ohio State (21–32). The Hoosiers had two All-Americans in their lineup – halfback Billy Hillenbrand and end Pete Pihos, together with Lou Saban at quarterback. Coach Bowser, while at Grove City, was 2–0 over Bo McMillin's Geneva squad.

Pitt starting left end Norbert Gestner had injured his knee and was replaced by Mike Sotack in the starting lineup. The Pitt athletic office announced that all servicemen in uniform would be granted free admission.

All-American Billy Hillenbrand threw three touchdown passes and Pitt lost their third game of the season 19–7. Halfback Bob Cowan hauled in a 46-yard scoring pass in the first quarter and Lou Saban added the extra point for a 7–0 Hoosier lead. In the second period, Ted Hasapes scored on a 6-yard toss from Hillenbrand to up the lead to 13–0. The Pitt offense answered with a 6-play, 72-yard drive that cut the lead to 13–7 at halftime. William Dutton completed a pass to end Mike Sotak on the 5-yard line and as he was being tackled, he lateraled to Jack Stetler, who ran into the end zone for his first touchdown. Walter West's first placement was low, but Indiana was offside. The second try split the uprights. The Indiana offense dominated the second half, but they only scored once. Hillenbrand connected with Cowan on a 44-yard pass to extend the lead to 19–0 late in the third quarter. The numbers were all in the Hoosiers favor. They earned 18 first downs, gained 231 yards on the ground and 184 through the air. Pitt had 5 first downs, 80 yards rushing and 80 yards passing. Indiana finished the season with a 7–3 record.

The Pitt starting lineup for the game against the Hoosiers was Mike Sotack (left end), Jack Durishan (left tackle), William Dillon (left guard), George Allshouse (center), Vince Antonelli (right guard), Joe Salvucci (right tackle), William Kyle (right end), Walter West (quarterback), William Duton (left halfback), Jack Statler (right halfback) and Frank Saksa (fullback). Substitutes appearing in the game for Pitt were Henry West, Martin Rosepink, Robert Costello, John Baker, Francis Mattioli, Robert Smith, Tony DiMatteo, Angelo Carlaccini and Matthew Gebel.

Scoring summary

Quarter	Time	Drive			Team	Scoring information	Score	
Quarter	Time	Plays	Yards	TOP	Team	Scoring information	Indiana	Pittsburgh
1		5	59		Indiana	Bob Cowan 46-yard touchdown reception from Billy Hillenbrand, Lou Saban kick good	7	0
2		6	33		Indiana	Ted Hasapes 6-yard touchdown reception from Billy Hillenbrand, Lou Saban kick no good	13	0
2		6	72		Pittsburgh	Mike Sotack, who lateraled to Jack Stetler 38-yard touchdown reception from William Dutton, Walter West kick good	13	7
3		5	49		Indiana	Bob Cowan 44-yard touchdown reception from Billy Hillenbrand, Lou Saban kick no good	19	7
"TOP" = time of possession. For other American football terms, see Glossary of American football.							19	7

=== Duke ===
Week 5: Duke at Pitt

Team	1	2	3	4	Total
• Duke	7	7	0	14	28
Pitt	0	0	0	0	0

- Date: October 24, 1942
- Location: Pitt Stadium
  Pittsburgh, PA
- Game start: 2:00 p.m.
- Game attendance: 20,000
- Game weather: cool and dry
- Referee: R. A. Carrington

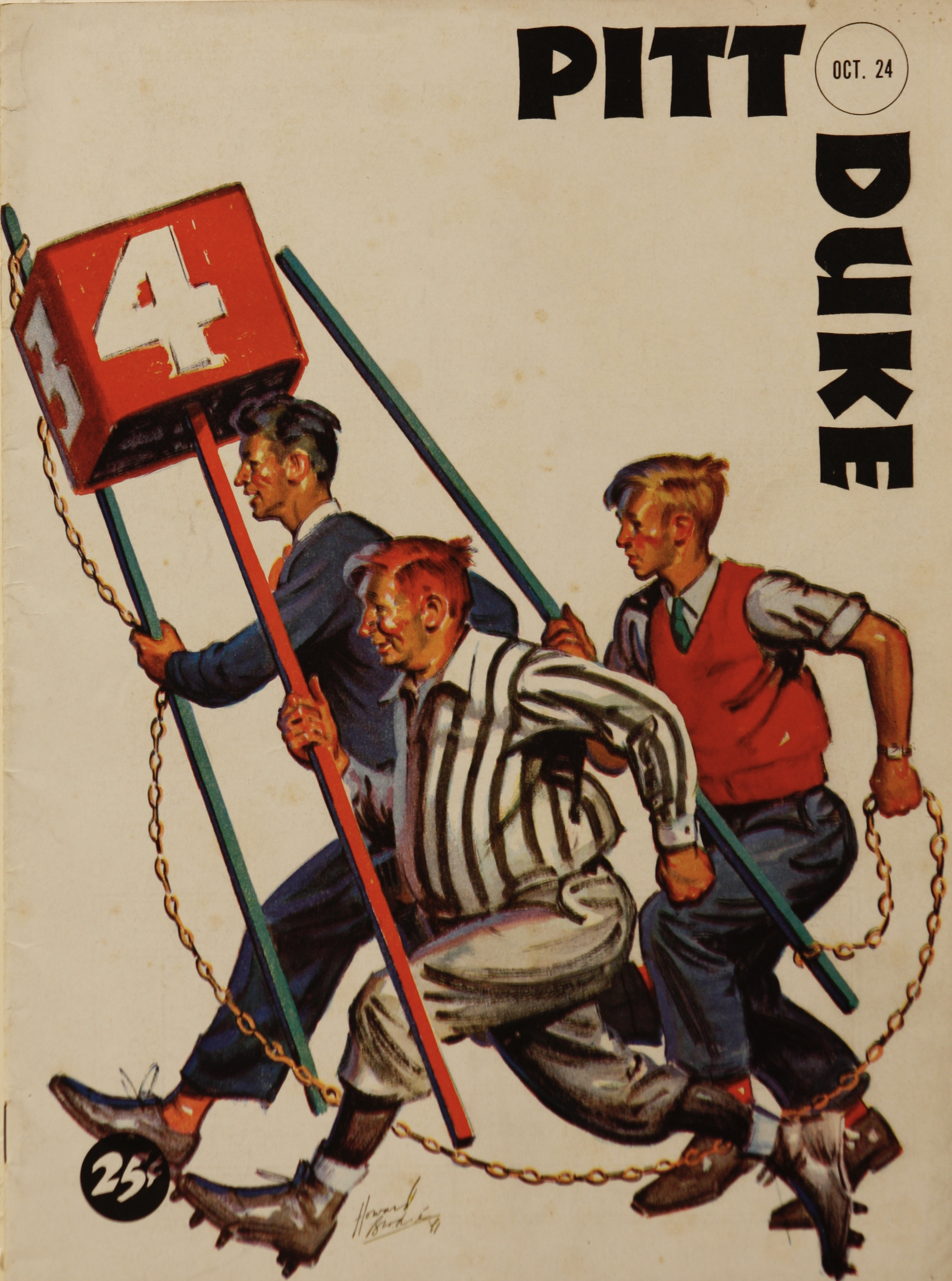
Program for October 24 game versus Duke

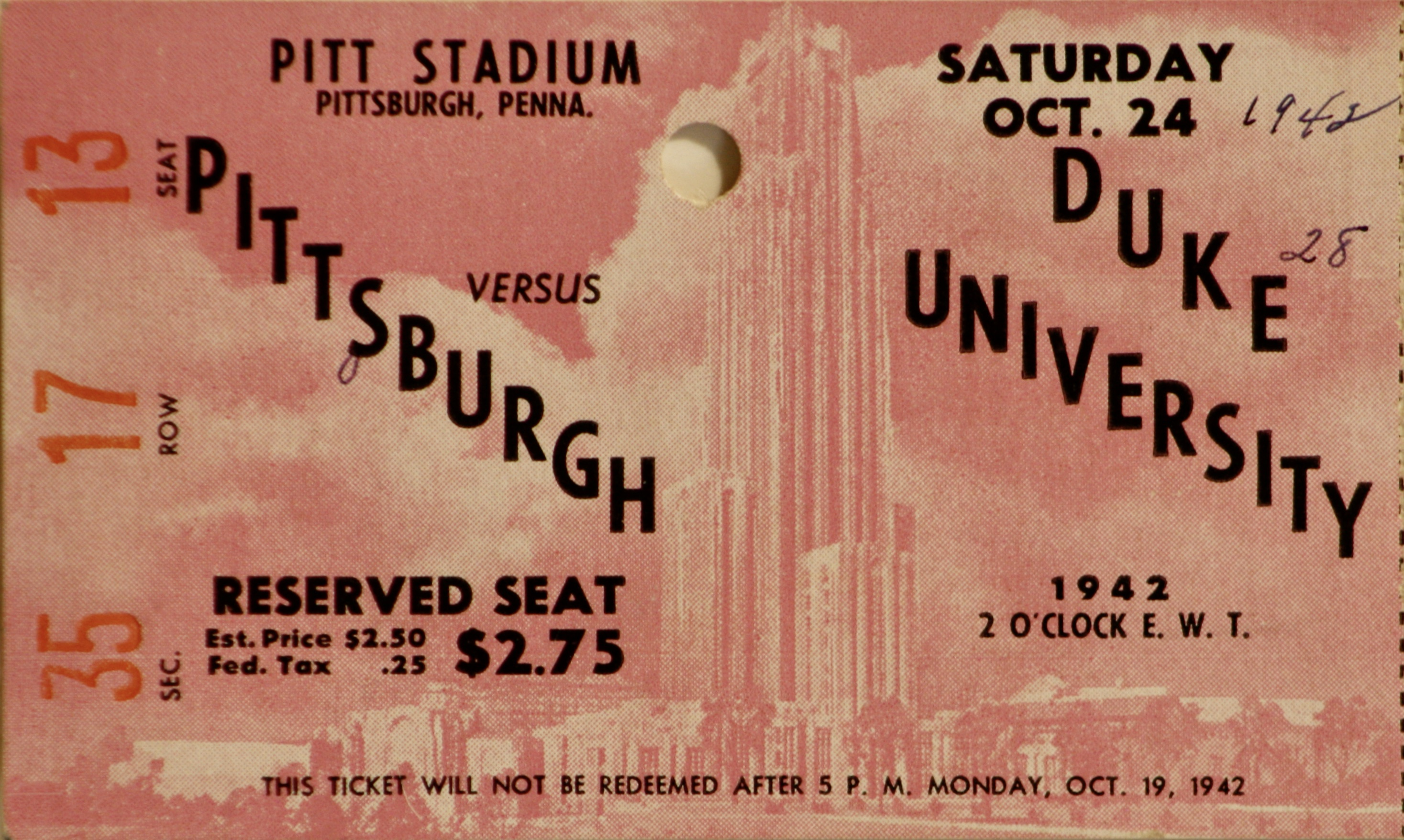
Ticket stub for October 24 game versus Duke

On October 24, the Eddie Cameron-led Duke Blue Devils came to Pittsburgh with a 2–2 record. After Pitt led the all-time series 3–1, Duke had won the last 2 games to even the slate at 3–3. Right end Robert Gantt was named All-America by the Football News.

Bowser adjusted the Panthers starting lineup due to injuries. John Baker replaced Joe Salvucci at right tackle, Matt Gebel replaced Frank Saksa at fullback, Tony DeMatteo replaced Jack Stetler at right halfback and Bob Smith replaced Walter West at quarterback. Substitute back Ralph Skertich dropped out of school and enlisted in the Army.

The Blue Devils took a 4–3 lead in the series with a 28–0 shutout of the Panthers. Pitt fullback Matt Gebel fumbled early in the opening period and Duke recovered on their 40-yard line. Two rushing plays gained a first down on the Pitt 45-yard line. Duke scored on the next play. Fullback Tom Davis threw a touchdown pass to Gordon Carver and Bob Gantt converted the first of his 4 extra points to give the Devils a 7–0 lead. Late in the second quarter Duke halfback Bobby Rute fielded a William Dutton punt on his own 42-yard line and raced 58 yards for the second touchdown. The third period was scoreless. Early in the final quarter Duke's offense went 57 yards in 5 plays for their third touchdown. Bobby Rute threw a 10-yard pass to Bob Gantt for the score. On their next possession, Pitt fumbled on their own 25-yard line. On first down Moffat Storer sped around left end to the end zone on a reverse from Tom Davis. Duke ended the season with a 5–4–1 record.

The 1943 Owl Yearbook was not pleased with the squad's effort in this contest: ....."Although Bill Dutton played his usual brand of bang-up ball, the team, as a whole, displayed its poorest form – slip-shod tackling, shoddy blocking, numerous fumbles and lack of spirit."

The Pitt starting lineup for the game against Duke was Mike Sotack (left end), Jack Durishan (left tackle), Francis Mattioli (left guard), George Allshouse (center), Vince Antonelli (right guard), John Baker (right tackle), William Kyle (right end), Robert Smith (quarterback), William Dutton (left halfback), Tony DiMatteo (right halfback) and Matthew Gebel (fullback). Substitutes appearing in the game for Pitt were Martin Rosepink, William Wachter, Bruce Allen, William Dillon, James Clowes, Walter West, Jack Stetler and Frank Saksa.

Scoring summary

Quarter	Time	Drive			Team	Scoring information	Score	
Quarter	Time	Plays	Yards	TOP	Team	Scoring information	Duke	Pittsburgh
1		3	59		Duke	Gordon Carver 45-yard touchdown reception from Tom Davis, Bob Gantt kick good	7	0
2		1	58		Duke	Punt returned 58 yards for touchdown by Bobby Rute, Bob Gantt kick good	14	0
4		5	57		Duke	Bob Gantt 10-yard touchdown reception from Bobby Rute, Bob Gantt kick good	21	0
4		1	25		Duke	Moffat Storer 25-yard touchdown run, Bob Gantt kick good	28	0
"TOP" = time of possession. For other American football terms, see Glossary of American football.							28	0

=== Carnegie Tech ===
Week 6: Carnegie Tech at Pitt

Team	1	2	3	4	Total
Carnegie Tech	0	6	0	0	6
• Pitt	6	0	0	13	19

- Date: October 31, 1942
- Location: Pitt Stadium
  Pittsburgh, PA
- Game start: 2:00 p.m.
- Game attendance: 5,000–7,500
- Game weather: warm with rain
- Referee: Hol Slutz

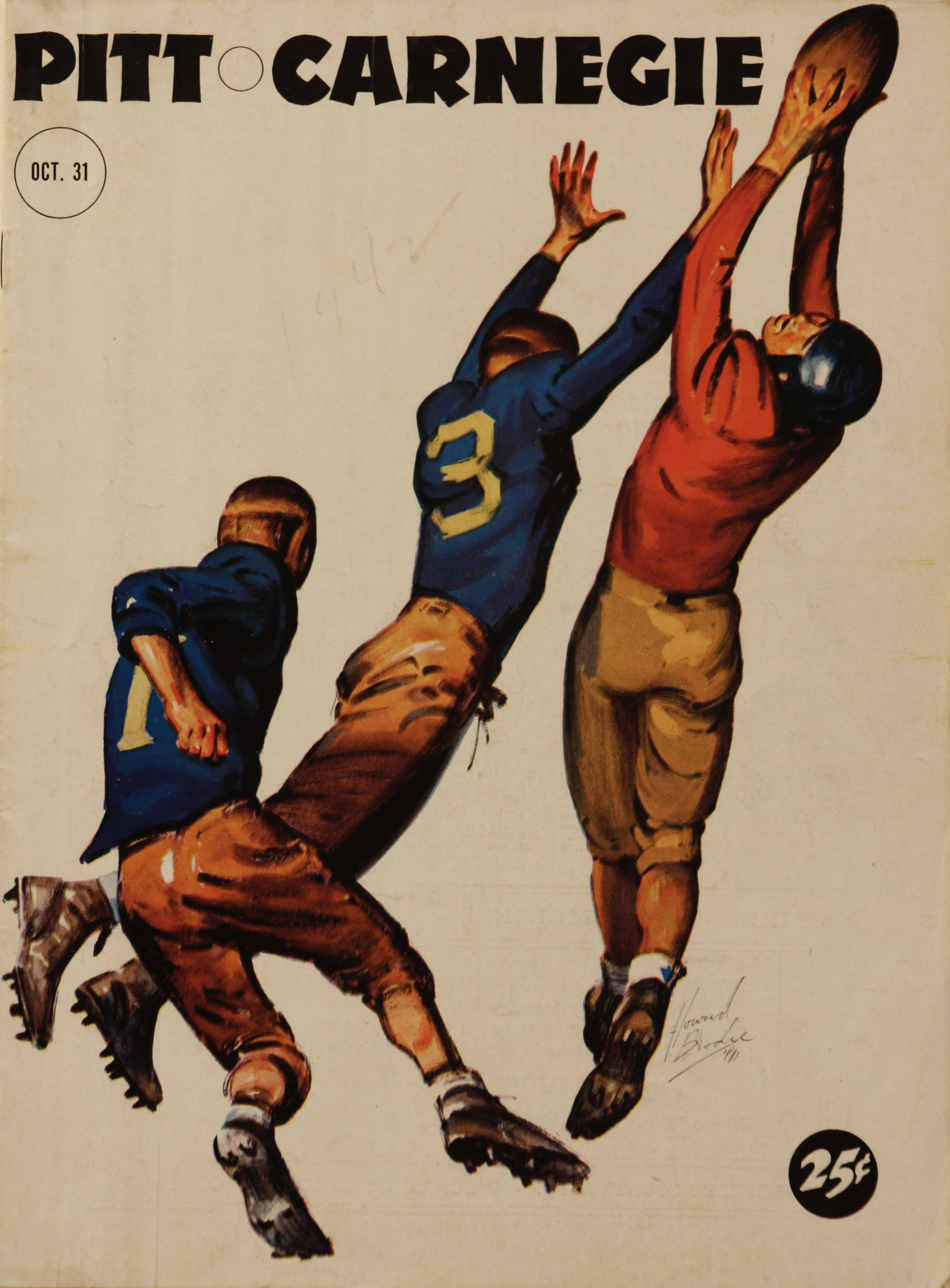
Program for October 31 game versus Carnegie Tech

On October 31, the Panthers and the Carnegie Tech Tartans met on the gridiron for the penultimate time. This Pitt Homecoming was their twenty-ninth game and Pitt held a lopsided (22–5–1) edge in the series. Eddie Baker's Tartans were 3–2 on the season, but Pitt was the only major school on their schedule. They beat Westminster, Grove City and Buffalo, and lost to Geneva and Case. Betty Brown, the Ice Capades majorette led the Tartan band at halftime.

Since the Tartans had been using freshmen all season, the Panthers added four to their injury-depleted roster. End Walt Cummins, center Frank Novak, quarterback Roland Catarinella and halfback Robert DeMar were promoted to varsity status. Quarterback Walter West and fullback Frank Saksa were back in the starting lineup.

On a rainy day, in front of 5,000 to 7,500 fans, the Pitt Panthers gained their twenty-third victory over Carnegie Tech 19–6. Early in the first period, Panther halfback Bill Dutton carried the ball into the end zone three times. The first touchdown was negated by a holding penalty, the second touchdown was negated by an offside penalty, the third touchdown put 6 points on the scoreboard. Walter West's placement was blocked by Bill Purcell. Late in the half, Tartan tackle Don Burns intercepted Bill Dutton's pass and scampered 54 yards to tie the score. Jack McLaughlin missed the extra point. The Pitt offense was in Tartan territory most of the third quarter, but was unable to score. Early in the final stanza, the Panthers gained possession on the Tartan 37-yard line. Tony DiMatteo carried the final 6 yards for the go-ahead score. Mike Sotak missed the extra point and Pitt led 12–6. The Panthers regained possession after an exchange of punts on the Tech 47-yard line. On second down, Frank Saksa took a hand-off and ran to the 15-yard line, where he lateraled to Bill Dutton and threw a block allowing Dutton to score. West was good on the placement, and Pitt won the twenty-ninth "City Game".

The Pitt starting lineup for the game against Carnegie Tech was Mike Sotack (left end), Jack Durishan (left tackle), Francis Mattioli (left guard), George Allshouse (center), Vince Antonelli (right guard), Robert Costello (right tackle), William Kyle (right end), Walter West (quarterback), William Dutton (left halfback), Tony DiMatteo (right halfback) and Frank Saksa (fullback). Substitutes appearing in the game for Pitt were Henry West, Martin Rosepink, Joe Pierre, Joe Brody, Bruce Allen, John Baker, William Dillon, James Mariades, Wilbur Newstetter, James Clowes, Robert Smith, Jack Stetler, Angelo Carlaccini and Louis Chelko.

Scoring summary

Quarter	Time	Drive			Team	Scoring information	Score	
Quarter	Time	Plays	Yards	TOP	Team	Scoring information	Carnegie Tech	Pittsburgh
1		6	16		Pitt	Bill Dutton 6-yard touchdown run, Walter West kick no good (blocked by Bill Purcell)	0	6
2		1	54		Carnegie Tech	Interception returned 54 yards for touchdown by Don Burns, Jack McLaughlin kick no good	6	6
4		11	38		Pitt	Tony DiMatteo 6-yard touchdown run, Mike Sotak kick no good (low and wide)	6	12
4		2	47		Pitt	Bill Dutton (on lateral from Frank Saksa) 44-yard touchdown run, Walter West kick good	6	19
"TOP" = time of possession. For other American football terms, see Glossary of American football.							6	19

=== At Ohio State ===
Week 7: Pitt at Ohio State

Team	1	2	3	4	Total
Pitt	0	0	7	12	19
• Ohio State	21	20	6	12	59

- Date: November 7, 1942
- Location: Ohio Stadium
  Columbus, OH
- Game start: 2:00 p.m.
- Game attendance: 34,893
- Referee: John Getchell (St. Thomas)

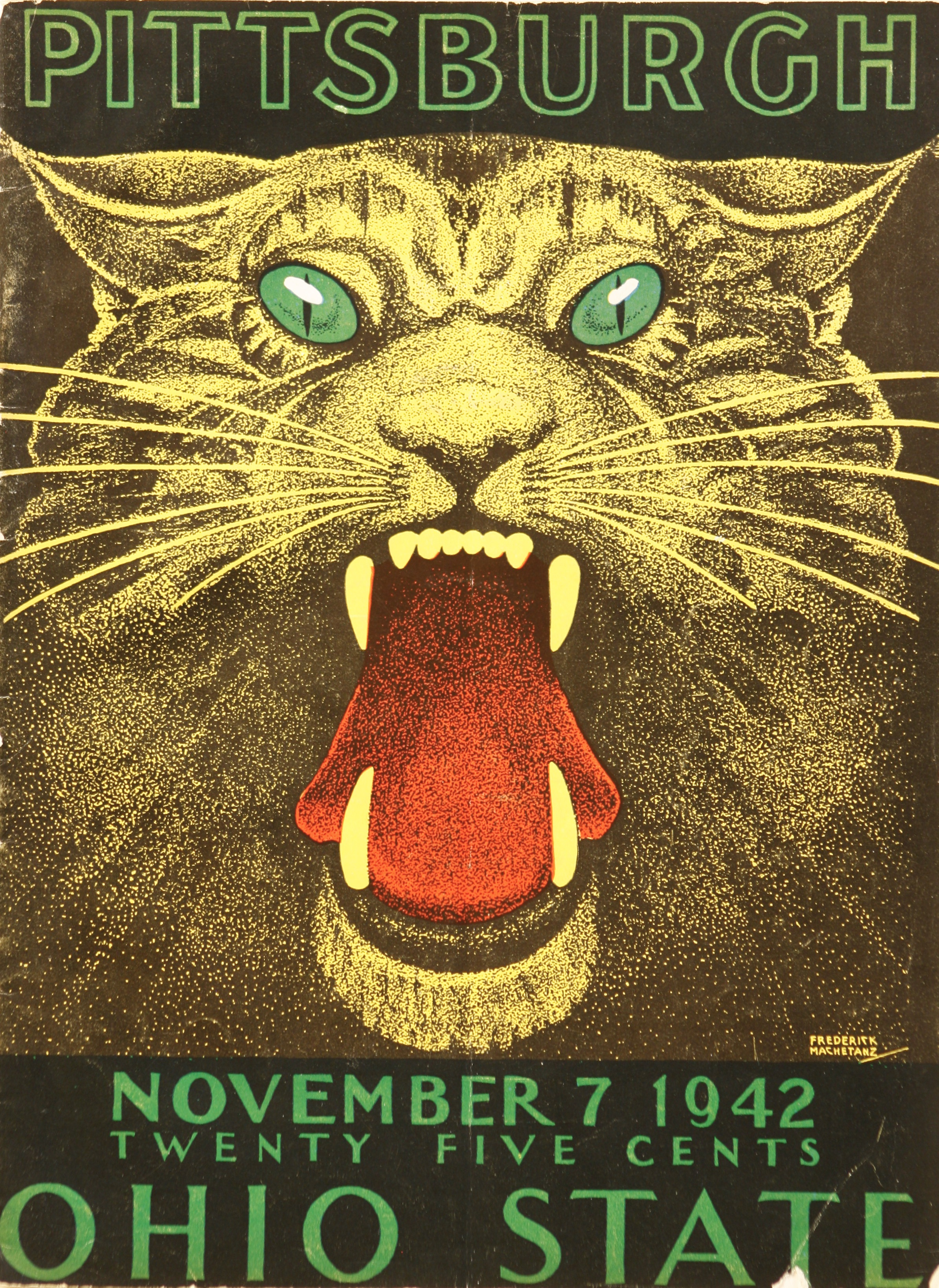
Program for the November 7 game versus Ohio State

On November 7, the Panthers and Buckeyes met for the seventh time. Ohio led the series 3–2–1, and had a 2-game winning streak. After losing to Wisconsin the previous week, second-year coach Paul Brown's squad had a 5–1 record, and was ranked #6 in the Associated Press poll. The Buckeyes' lineup had 5 All-Americans – end Robert Shaw, tackle Charles Csuri, guard Lindell Lee Houston, halfback Gene Fekete and halfback Paul Sarringhaus.

Coach Bowser, who had an 0–7 record against Western Conference foes, had to replace six injured regulars in the starting lineup. Chester Smith of The Pittsburgh Press wrote: "Frankly", a man who is in close touch with the Western Conference said, 'Pitt is farther away from the Big Nine today than for the last three years. We play a pretty rugged brand of football in our league, and it was because it could no longer compete that the University of Chicago withdrew from our football schedules. If Pitt can't do any better than it has, the chances of it being taken in are mighty slim."

Ohio State rebounded from their loss to Wisconsin by scoring nine touchdowns against the hapless Panthers. The final score read 59–19. The Buckeye starters played until the score was 28–0, and then the substitutes took charge, and scored 5 more touchdowns. Bill Dutton was the lone bright spot for the Panthers, as he scored two rushing touchdowns and passed for a third. In the third quarter, trailing 47–0, Pitt gained possession on their own 36-yard line. On first down, Dutton completed a 49-yard pass to Bill Dillon, who was tackled on the State 15-yard line. Dutton then ran through right tackle for the score. Walter West added the point after. The Panthers defense then forced State to punt for the first time, and Pitt gained possession on their own 15-yard line. Pitt advanced the ball to their own 47-yard line in eight plays with Dutton doing the bulk of the work. On third down “Wild Bill” scampered 53-yards around end for his second touchdown. West missed the extra point. The Buckeyes added two more touchdowns before the Panthers last tally. The Pitt defense held State on downs on the Pitt 46-yard line. Three plays produced the final Panther touchdown. A 20-yard pass completion from Dutton to Robert Smith was followed by a 22-yard Dutton run to the 13-yard line. Then Dutton passed to Francis Mattioli for the score. Mike Sotak missed the placement.

Ohio State finished the season with a 9–1 record and was ranked number 1 by the Associated Press.

The Pitt starting lineup for the game against Ohio State was Mike Sotack (left end), Bruce Allen (left tackle), William Dillon (left guard), James Clowes (center), Vince Antonelli (right guard), John Baker (right tackle), Martin Rosepink (right end), Walter West (quarterback), William Dutton (left halfback), Angelo Carlaccini (right halfback) and Frank Saksa (fullback). Substitutes for Pitt appearing in the game were Henry West, William Kyle, Joe Pierre, Jack Durishan, Joe Salvucci, Wilbur Newstetter, Howard Scott, Jack Stetler, Matthew Gebel, Louyis Chelko and John Montana.

Scoring summary

Quarter	Time	Drive			Team	Scoring information	Score	
Quarter	Time	Plays	Yards	TOP	Team	Scoring information	Pittsburgh	Ohio State
1		4	65		Ohio State	Paul Sarringhaus 1-yard touchdown run, Gene Fekete kick good	0	7
1		4	65		Ohio State	Tommy James 15-yard touchdown run, Gene Fekete kick good	0	14
1		1	84		Ohio State	Gene Fekete 84-yard touchdown run, Gene Fekete kick good	0	21
2		4	52		Ohio State	Paul Sarringhaus 1-yard touchdown run, Gene Fekete kick good	0	28
2		3	53		Ohio State	Robert Frye 42-yard touchdown reception from George Slusser, Robert Frye kick good	0	35
2		14	77		Ohio State	Richard Palmer 1-yard touchdown run, Tommy James kick no good	0	41
3		7	78		Ohio State	Ken Eichwald 34-yard touchdown reception from George Slusser, George Slusser kick no good	0	47
3		2	64		Pittsburgh	William Dutton 15-yard touchdown run, Walter West kick good	7	47
4		8	85		Pittsburgh	William Dutton 53-yard touchdown run, Walter West kick no good	13	47
4		2	22		Ohio State	Cyril Lipaj 4-yard touchdown run, Cyril Lipaj kick no good	13	53
4		3	7		Ohio State	Loren Staker 3-yard touchdown run, Georgev Slusser kick no good	13	59
4		4	54		Pittsburgh	Francis Mattioli 22-yard touchdown reception from William Dutton, Mike Sotak kick no good	19	59
"TOP" = time of possession. For other American football terms, see Glossary of American football.							19	59

=== Nebraska ===
Week 8: Nebraska at Pitt

Team	1	2	3	4	Total
Nebraska	0	0	0	0	0
• Pitt	6	0	0	0	6

- Date: November 14, 1942
- Location: Pitt Stadium
  Pittsburgh, PA
- Game start: 2:00 p.m.
- Game attendance: 6,000–7,000
- Game weather: cold
- Referee: H. O. Dayoff (Bucknell)

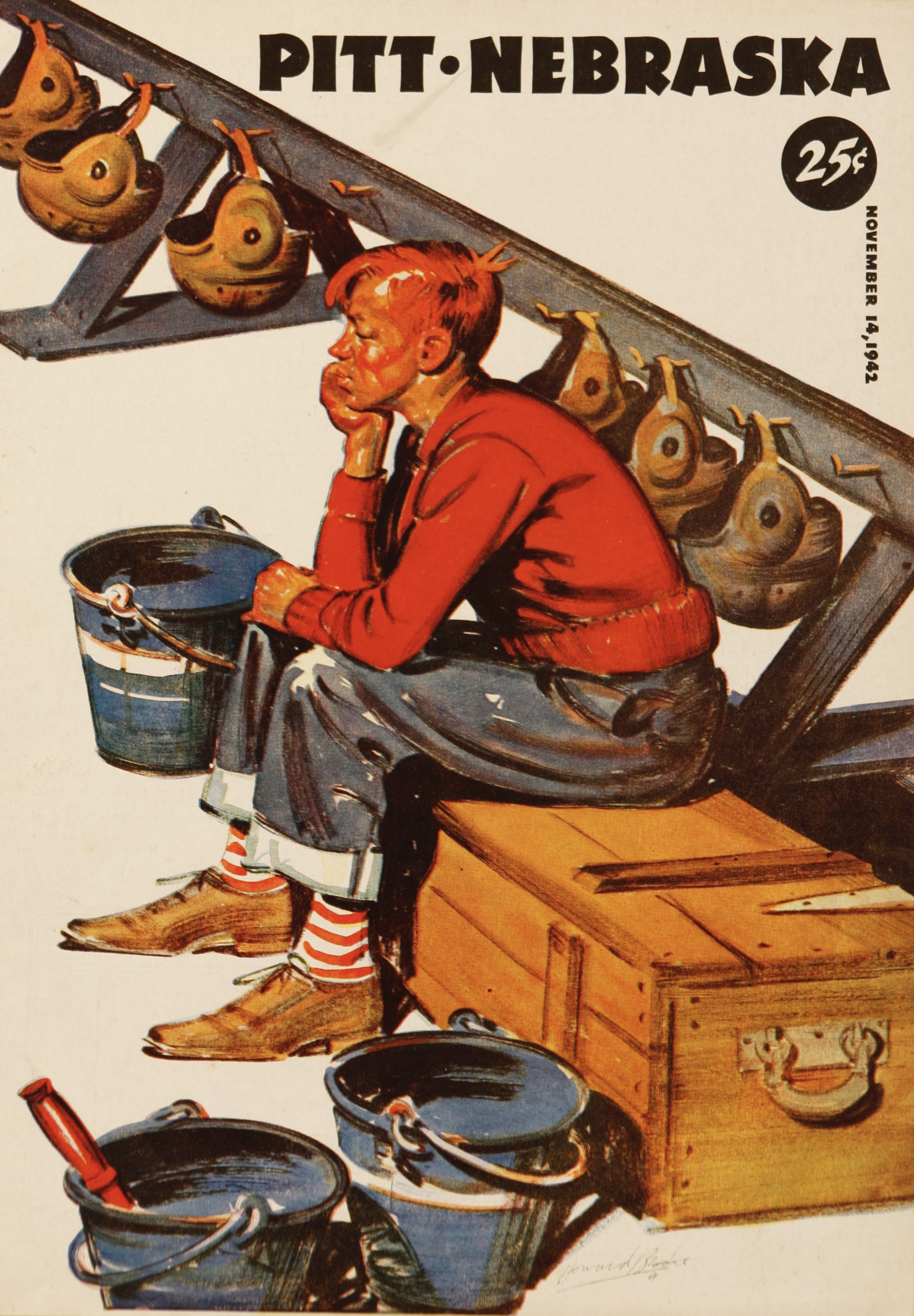
Program for the November 14 game versus Nebraska

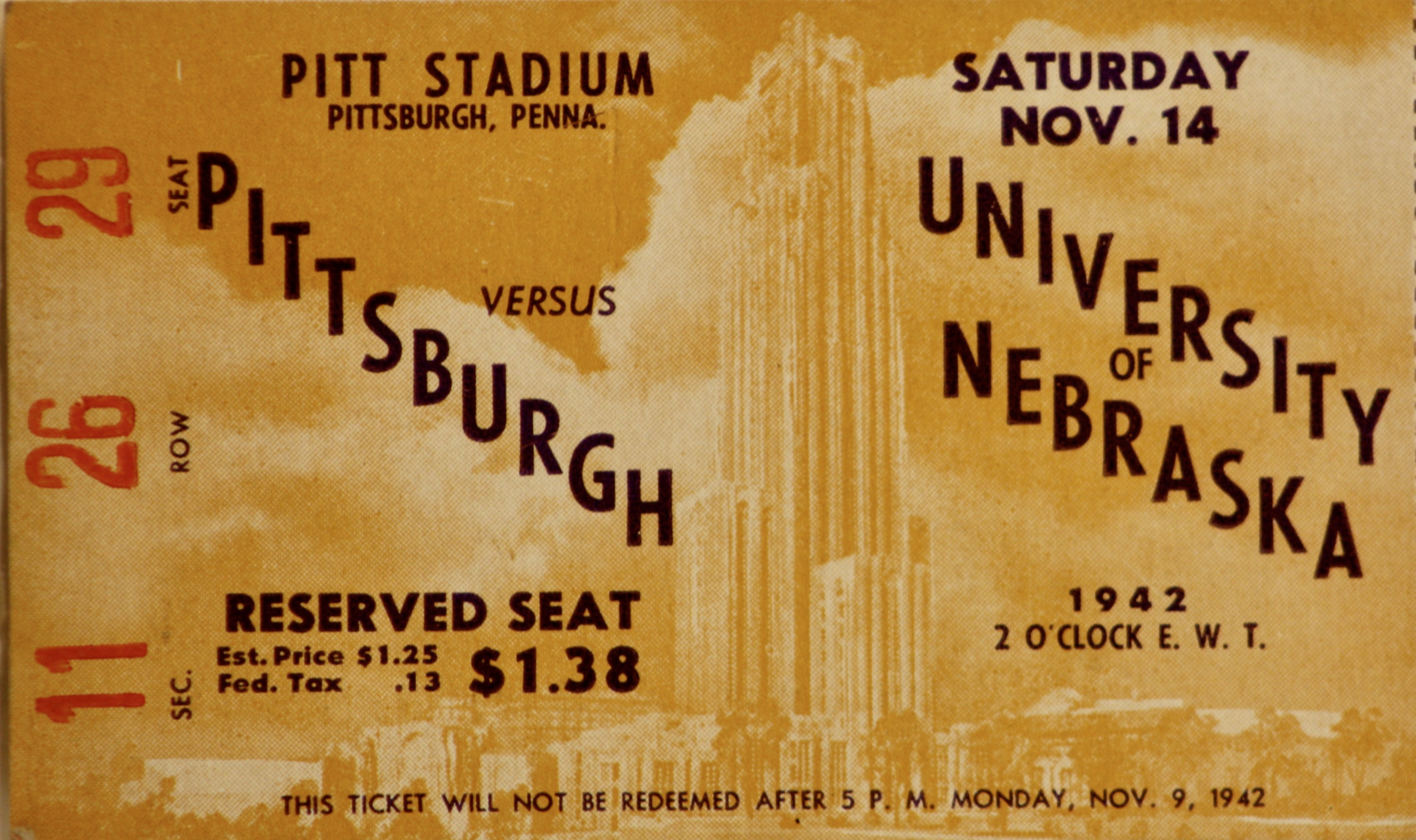
Ticket stub for November 14 game vesus Nebraska

On November 14, the Pitt Panthers played the Nebraska Cornhuskers for the seventeenth time. Pitt led the series 10–3–3. Former Husker running back Glenn Presnell was their coach. His squad was 3–4 for the season, having just lost to the Big Six Conference champion Missouri Tigers 26–6 the previous week. Coach Presnell spoke with the Pittsburgh Sun-Telegraph: "We are in poor physical shape," Presnell explained, "but at that I guess we are no worse off than Pitt. We have had a pretty rough time of it this year. Our material is down, with a lot of the boys we counted upon going into military service, and there's been no corresponding reduction in our schedule."

Nine Panthers suited up for their final game at Pitt Stadium. Bill Dutton, Jack Stetler, Frank Saksa, Walt West, Vince Antonelli, Joe Salvucci and George Allshouse were seniors. Jim Clowes and Jim Mariades joined the Marines. Due to multiple injuries, Coach Bower started two sophomores in the backfield (Bob Smith at quarterback and Lou Chelko at right halfback), along with subs Jim Clowes at center, John Baker at tackle and Martin Rosepink at end.

On a frigid day in Pittsburgh, the Panthers beat the Cornhuskers 6–0. Halfway through the opening quarter, a 41-yard pass from Pitt back Bill Dutton was deflected by Husker defensive back Marv Athey into the waiting hands of Pitt end Mike Sotack on the 5-yard line and he trotted into the end zone for the only score of the game. Walter West's placement attempt was blocked. The Cornhuskers gained 15 first downs and 213 total yards, but the Panther defense intercepted two passes and recovered two fumbles to keep the shutout intact.

Coach Presnell stated: "It looked to me like a couple of teams from the infirmary playing out there today." Nebraska finished the season with a 3–7 record in Presnell's only season.

Pitt halfback William Dutton, third-leading gainer in the country, added 136 yards to bring his total to 1256 yards for the season. He ranked second all-time at Pitt, trailing Warren Heller's 1931 record of 1338 by 82 yards.

The Pitt starting lineup for the game against Nebraska was Mike Sotack (left end), Jack Durishan (left tackle), Francis Mattioli (left guard), James Clowes (center), Vince Antonelli (right guard), John Baker (right tackle), Martin Rosepink (right end), Robert Smith (quarterback), William Dutton (left halfback), Louis Chelko (right halfback) and Frank Saksa (fullback). Substitutes appearing in the game for Pitt were Henry West, William Kyle, George Allshouse, Walter West, Tony DiMatteo and Jack Stetler.

Scoring summary

Quarter	Time	Drive			Team	Scoring information	Score	
Quarter	Time	Plays	Yards	TOP	Team	Scoring information	Nebraska	Pittsburgh
1		2	45		Pittsburgh	Mike Sotack 41-yard touchdown reception from William Dutton, Walter West kick no good (blocked by Vic Schleich)	0	6
"TOP" = time of possession. For other American football terms, see Glossary of American football.							0	6

=== At Penn State ===
Week 9: Pitt at Penn State

Team	1	2	3	4	Total
Pitt	0	0	6	0	6
• Penn State	0	0	7	7	14

- Date: November 21, 1942
- Location: New Beaver Field
  State College, PA
- Game start: 2:00 p.m.
- Game attendance: 11,710
- Referee: W. D. Maginnes (Lehigh)

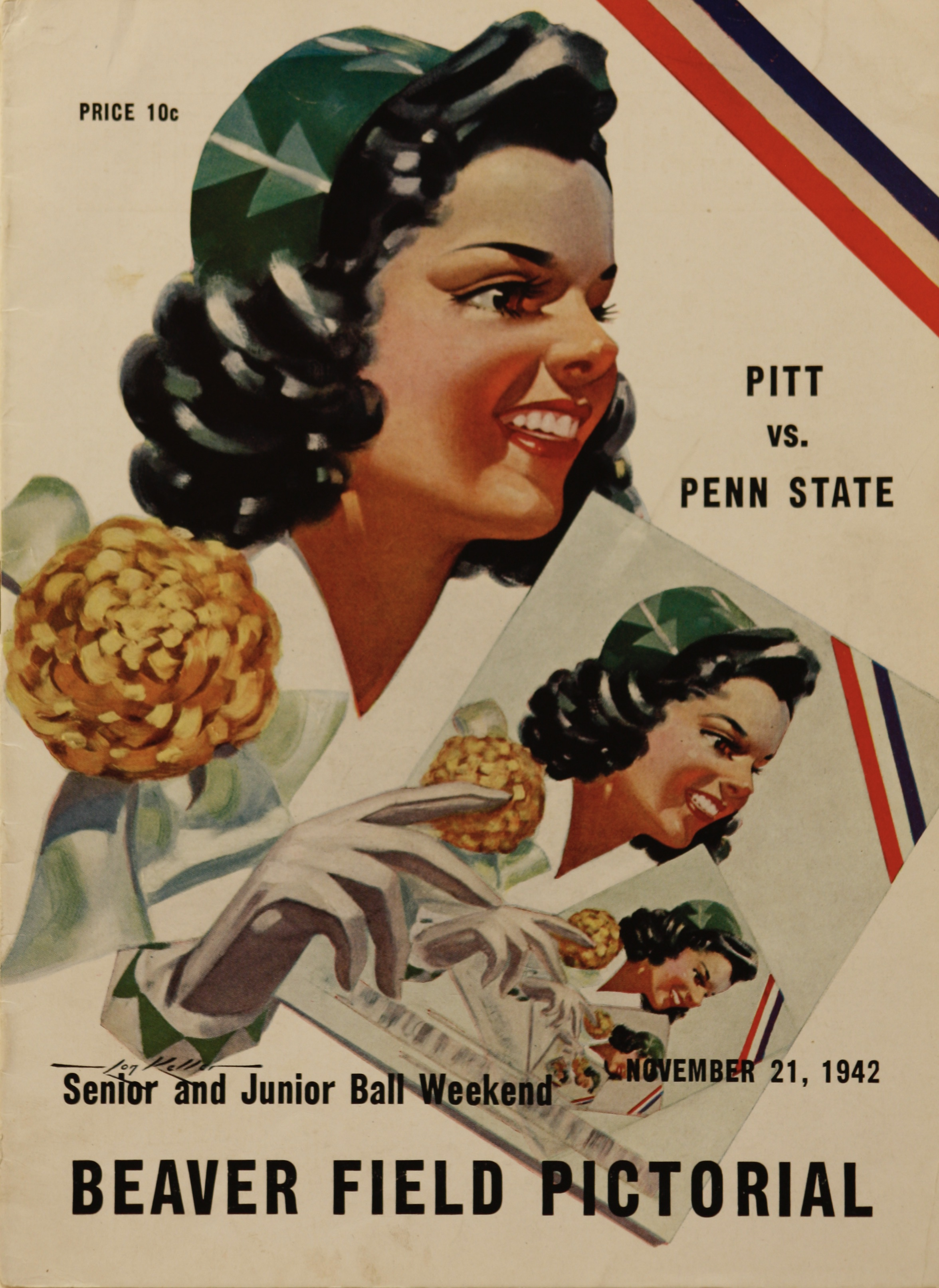
Program for November 21 game versus Penn State

On November 21, the Panthers ended their season at State College. Pitt lead the all-time series 24–15–2, but Penn State had won 2 of the past 3 games. Bob Higgins' Lions were 5–1–1 on the season. A (24–0) loss at West Virginia and a scoreless tie at Cornell were the only blemishes on their schedule. Higgins replaced injured Sparky Brown with Larry Joe at left halfback. Joe had scored the winning touchdown against Penn the week before. Coach Higgins urged caution: "I know we have a better record than Pitt, but then we had a better record than the Panthers two years ago when they knocked us out of a bowl bid in the Pitt Stadium. We won't have Sparky Brown, our ace left halfback, available today...."

Coach Bowser made two adjustments in the Pitt lineup. Henry West replaced the injured Mike Sotack at left end and Walter West was back at quarterback.

The de-emphasized Panthers lost back-to-back games to the Lions for the first time since the 1911- 1912 seasons. After a scoreless first half, the Lions managed to score two touchdowns and two extra points in the second half, while holding the Panthers to a single touchdown for a 14–6 victory. Substitute-halfback Larry Joe took the second half kick-off 90 yards for the first touchdown. Wilbur Van Lenten booted the extra point and State lead 7–0. Pitt answered late in the third period. Frank Saksa returned a punt from mid-field to the State 10-yard line. On second down, Bill Dutton passed to Walter West for the touchdown. West's placement attempt to tie the game was blocked. State added a touchdown in the final quarter on a 6-yard touchdown pass from Bobby Williams to Aldo Cenci. Van Lenten's placement made it 14–6. Penn State did not get a Bowl bid and ended the season with a 6–1–1 record and ranked #19 in the AP poll.

The State defense stymied Bill Dutton's chance to pass Warren Heller as Pitt's all-time season leading ball-carrier. Dutton ran the ball 20 times for minus 1-yard. He only completed 3 of 18 passes for 30-yards and had 5 intercepted.

The Pitt starting lineup for the game against Penn State was Henry West (left end), Jack Durishan (left tackle), Francis Mattioli (left guard), James Clowes (center), Vince Antonelli (right guard), John Baker (right tackle), Martin Rosepink (right end), Walter West (quarterback), William Dutton (left halfback), Louis Chelko (right halfback) and Frank Saksa (fullback). Substitutes appearing in the game for Pitt were Mike Sotack, William Kyle, Joe Salvucci, Robert Costello, William Dillon, George Allshouse, Robert Smith, Angelo Carlaccini, Jack Stetler, Matthew Gebel and Tony DiMatteo.

Scoring summary

Quarter	Time	Drive			Team	Scoring information	Score	
Quarter	Time	Plays	Yards	TOP	Team	Scoring information	Pittsburgh	Penn State
3		1	90		Penn State		0	7
3		2	10		Pittsburgh	Walter West 9-yard touchdown reception from William Dutton, Walter West kick no good (blocked)	6	7
4		5	48		Penn State	Aldo Cenci 4-yard touchdown reception from Bobby Williams, Wilbur Van Lenten kick good	6	14
"TOP" = time of possession. For other American football terms, see Glossary of American football.							6	14

== Individual scoring summary ==
1942 Pittsburgh Panthers scoring summary
Player	Touchdowns	Extra points	Field goals	Safety	Points
Bill Dutton	6	0	0	0	36
Tony DiMatteo	3	0	0	0	18
Walter West	1	6	0	0	12
Francis Mattioli	1	0	0	0	6
Frank Saksa	1	0	0	0	6
Mike Sotak	1	0	0	0	6
Jack Stetler	1	0	0	0	6
Totals	14	6	0	0	90

== Postseason ==
Letters were awarded to Norbert Gestner, Jack Durishan, William Dillon, George Allshouse, Vince Antonelli, Joe Salvucci, William Kyle, Walter West, Tony DiMatteo, jack Stetler, Frank Saksa, James Clowes, Francis Mattioli, John Baker, Robert Costello, Mike Sotack, William Dutton, Angelo Carlaccini, Robert Smith, Martin Rosepink, Henry West, Matthew Gebel and Louis Chelko.

Bill Dutton was named to the Associated Press All-Eastern team, and earned honorable mention on the United Press All-American team.

On December 8, Dr. Ralph Shanor, Pitt's team doctor for 14 years, was commissioned lieutenant-commander in the Navy.

== Team players drafted into the NFL ==
The following players were selected in the 1943 NFL draft.

Player	Position	Round	Pick	NFL club
Bill Dutton	Back	3	25	Washington Redskins
Jack Stetler	Back	26	245	Cleveland Rams
Jack Durishan	Tackle	29	277	Steagles
George Allhouse	Center	30	283	Brooklyn Dodgers
