= 1942 Kansas Jayhawks football team =

American college football season

1942 Kansas Jayhawks football
- Conference: Big Six Conference
- Record: 2–8 (1–4 Big 6)
- Head coach: Gwinn Henry (4th season)
- Captain: None
- Home stadium: Memorial Stadium

1942 Big Six Conference football standings
	Conf.					Overall
Team	W		L		T	W		L		T
Missouri $	4	–	0	–	1	8	–	3	–	1
Oklahoma	3	–	1	–	1	3	–	5	–	2
Nebraska	3	–	2	–	0	3	–	7	–	0
Kansas State	2	–	3	–	0	3	–	8	–	0
Iowa State	1	–	4	–	0	3	–	6	–	0
Kansas	1	–	4	–	0	2	–	8	–	0
$ – Conference champion

The 1942 Kansas Jayhawks football team represented the University of Kansas in the Big Six Conference during the 1942 college football season. In their fourth and final season under head coach Gwinn Henry, the Jayhawks compiled a 2–8 record (1–4 against conference opponents), tied for fifth place in the conference, and were outscored by opponents by a combined total of 248 to 77. They played their home games at Memorial Stadium in Lawrence, Kansas.

The team's statistical leaders included Ray Evans with 293 rushing yards and 1,117 passing yards, Otto Schnellbacher with 366 receiving yards, and Ed Lindquist with 24 points scored (four touchdowns). No team captain was elected in 1942. Two players on the team would later become more well-known for accomplishments other than their playing careers. End Bob Dole would later go on to a lengthy political career and quarterback Bud Adams would later become a businessman and NFL owner.

Kansas was ranked at No. 131 (out of 590 college and military teams) in the final rankings under the Litkenhous Difference by Score System for 1942.

== Schedule ==
Date	Opponent	Site	Result	Attendance	Source
September 19	Iowa Navy Pre-Flight*	Memorial Stadium; Lawrence, KS	L 0–61	3,000	
September 26	Marquette*	Memorial Stadium; Lawrence, KS	L 0–14	2,006	
October 2	at Denver*	DU Stadium; Denver, CO	L 0–17	8,000	
October 10	at TCU*	Amon G. Carter Stadium; Fort Worth, TX	L 6–41		
October 17	Oklahoma	Memorial Stadium; Lawrence, KS	L 0–25	4,000	
October 24	at Kansas State	Memorial Stadium; Manhattan, KS (rivalry)	W 19–7		
October 31	Nebraska^{†}	Memorial Stadium; Lawrence, KS (rivalry)	L 7–14	5,187	
November 7	Washington University*	Memorial Stadium; Lawrence, KS	W 19–7	2,400	
November 14	at Iowa State	Clyde Williams Field; Ames, IA	L 13–20	4,217	
November 26	at Missouri	Memorial Stadium; Columbia, MO (rivalry)	L 13–42	10,000	
*Non-conference game; ^{†}Homecoming
