= 1942 Kansas State Wildcats football team =

American college football season

1942 Kansas State Wildcats football
- Conference: Big Six Conference
- Record: 3–8 (2–3 Big 6)
- Head coach: Ward Haylett (1st season)
- Home stadium: Memorial Stadium

1942 Big Six Conference football standings
	Conf.					Overall
Team	W		L		T	W		L		T
Missouri $	4	–	0	–	1	8	–	3	–	1
Oklahoma	3	–	1	–	1	3	–	5	–	2
Nebraska	3	–	2	–	0	3	–	7	–	0
Kansas State	2	–	3	–	0	3	–	8	–	0
Iowa State	1	–	4	–	0	3	–	6	–	0
Kansas	1	–	4	–	0	2	–	8	–	0
$ – Conference champion

The 1942 Kansas State Wildcats football team represented Kansas State University in the 1942 college football season. The team's head football coach was Ward Haylett, in his first year at the helm of the Wildcats. The Wildcats played their home games in Memorial Stadium. The Wildcats finished the season with a 3–8 record with a 2–3 record in conference play. They finished in fourth place in the Big Six Conference. The Wildcats scored 79 points and gave up 334 points.

Kansas State was ranked at No. 230 (out of 590 college and military teams) in the final rankings under the Litkenhous Difference by Score System for 1942.

== Schedule ==
Date	Opponent	Site	Result	Attendance	Source
September 19	at Kansas Wesleyan*	Salina, KS	W 37–6		
September 26	at Texas*	War Memorial Stadium; Austin, TX	L 0–64	15,000	
October 3	Fort Riley*	Memorial Stadium; Manhattan, KS	L 7–21	5,500	
October 10	at Duquesne*	Forbes Field; Pittsburgh, PA	L 0–33	13,176	
October 17	Missouri	Memorial Stadium; Manhattan, KS	L 2–46	5,500	
October 24	Kansas^{†}	Memorial Stadium; Manhattan, KS (rivalry)	L 7–19	7,500	
October 31	at Wichita*	Wichita, KS	L 0–9	5,000	
November 7	at Oklahoma	Oklahoma Memorial Stadium; Norman, OK	L 0–76	8,000	
November 14	at Indiana*	Memorial Stadium; Bloomington, IN	L 0–54	7,500	
November 21	Iowa State	Memorial Stadium; Manhattan, KS (rivalry)	W 7–6	4,180	
November 28	at Nebraska	Memorial Stadium; Lincoln, NE (rivalry)	W 19–0	7,000	
*Non-conference game; ^{†}Homecoming
