= 1942 Iowa State Cyclones football team =

American college football season

1942 Iowa State Cyclones football
- Conference: Big Six Conference
- Record: 3–6 (1–4 Big 6)
- Head coach: Ray Donels (2nd season; first 3 games); Mike Michalske (1st season, final 6 games)
- Captain: Royal Lohry
- Home stadium: Clyde Williams Field

1942 Big Six Conference football standings
	Conf.					Overall
Team	W		L		T	W		L		T
Missouri $	4	–	0	–	1	8	–	3	–	1
Oklahoma	3	–	1	–	1	3	–	5	–	2
Nebraska	3	–	2	–	0	3	–	7	–	0
Kansas State	2	–	3	–	0	3	–	8	–	0
Iowa State	1	–	4	–	0	3	–	6	–	0
Kansas	1	–	4	–	0	2	–	8	–	0
$ – Conference champion

The 1942 Iowa State Cyclones football team represented Iowa State College of Agricultural and Mechanic Arts (later renamed Iowa State University) in the Big Six Conference during the 1942 college football season. Under head coaches Ray Donels (first three games) and Mike Michalske (final six games), the Cyclones compiled a 3–6 record (1–4 against conference opponents), tied for last place in the conference, and were outscored by opponents by a combined total of 177 to 94. They played their home games at Clyde Williams Field in Ames, Iowa.

Royal Lohry was the team captain. Back Paul Darling was selected as a first-team all-conference player.

Iowa State was ranked at No. 128 (out of 590 college and military teams) in the final rankings under the Litkenhous Difference by Score System for 1942.

== Schedule ==
Date	Time	Opponent	Site	Result	Attendance	Source
September 25	9:00 p.m.	at Denver*	DU Stadium; Denver, CO	W 7–0	7,073	
October 3	3:00 p.m.	at Nebraska	Memorial Stadium; Lincoln, NE (rivalry)	L 0–26	14,472	
October 10	3:00 p.m.	Marquette*	Clyde Williams Field; Ames, IA	L 12–34	7,000	
October 17	2:00 p.m.	Drake*	Clyde Williams Field; Ames, IA	W 29–6	6,081	
October 24	3:00 p.m.	at Missouri	Memorial Stadium; Columbia, MO (rivalry)	L 6–45	7,094	
October 31	2:00 p.m.	Oklahoma^{†}	Clyde Williams Field; Ames, IA	L 7–14	7,720	
November 6	8:30 p.m.	at Villanova*	Shibe Park; Philadelphia, PA	L 7–32	8,827	
November 14	2:00 p.m.	Kansas	Clyde Williams Field; Ames, IA	W 20–13	4,217	
November 21	3:00 p.m.	at Kansas State	Memorial Stadium; Manhattan, KS (rivalry)	L 6–7	4,180	
*Non-conference game; ^{†}Homecoming; All times are in Central time
