= 1942 All-Big Six Conference football team =

The 1942 All-Big Six Conference football team consists of American football players chosen by various organizations for All-Big Six Conference teams for the 1942 college football season. The selectors for the 1942 season included the Associated Press (AP) and the United Press (UP).

== All-Big Six selections ==
=== Backs ===
- Huell Hamm, Oklahoma (AP-1 [QB]; UP-1)
- Ray Evans, Kansas (AP-1 [HB]; UP-1)
- Bob Steuber, Missouri (AP-1 [HB]; UP-1)
- Paul Darling, Iowa State (AP-1 [FB]; UP-2)
- Royal Lohry, Iowa State (AP-2 [HB]; UP-1)
- Harold Adams, Missouri (AP-2 [QB]; UP-2)
- Bill Campbell, Oklahoma (AP-2 [HB])
- Don Reece, Missouri (AP-2 [FB])
- Kerwin Eisenhart, Nebraska (UP-2)
- Thomas Davis, Oklahoma (UP-2)

=== Ends ===
- Bert Ekern, Missouri (AP-1; UP-1)
- Walt Lamb, Oklahoma (AP-1; UP-1)
- Marshall Shurnas, Missouri (AP-2; UP-2)
- James Tyree, Oklahoma (AP-2)
- Marvin Thompson, Nebraska (UP-2)

=== Tackles ===
- Vic Schleigh, Nebraska (AP-1; UP-1)
- Homer Simmons, Oklahoma (AP-1)
- Edward Hodges, Missouri (AP-2; UP-1)
- Bernard Pepper, Missouri (AP-2; UP-2)
- LaVerne McGraw, Iowa State (UP-2)

=== Guards ===
- Mike Fitzgerald, Missouri (AP-1; UP-1)
- Clare Morford, Oklahoma (AP-1; UP-1)
- Verlie Abrams, Missouri (AP-2)
- Charles Duda, Nebraska (AP-2; UP-2)
- Neill, Kansas State (UP-2)

=== Centers ===
- Jack Marsee, Oklahoma (AP-1; UP-2)
- Jeff Davis, Missouri (AP-2; UP-1)

== Key ==
- AP = Associated Press
- UP = United Press

== See also ==
- 1942 College Football All-America Team
