= 1942 Nebraska Cornhuskers football team =

American college football season

1942 Nebraska Cornhuskers football
- Conference: Big Six Conference
- Record: 3–7 (3–2 Big 6)
- Head coach: Glenn Presnell (1st season)
- Offensive scheme: T formation
- Home stadium: Memorial Stadium

1942 Big Six Conference football standings
	Conf.					Overall
Team	W		L		T	W		L		T
Missouri $	4	–	0	–	1	8	–	3	–	1
Oklahoma	3	–	1	–	1	3	–	5	–	2
Nebraska	3	–	2	–	0	3	–	7	–	0
Kansas State	2	–	3	–	0	3	–	8	–	0
Iowa State	1	–	4	–	0	3	–	6	–	0
Kansas	1	–	4	–	0	2	–	8	–	0
$ – Conference champion

The 1942 Nebraska Cornhuskers football team was an American football team that represented the University of Nebraska in the Big Six Conference during the 1942 college football season. In its only season under head coach Glenn Presnell, the team compiled a 3–7 record (3–2 against conference opponents), finished third in the Big Six, and was outscored by a total of 158 to 55.

Nebraska was ranked at No. 102 (out of 590 college and military teams) in the final rankings under the Litkenhous Difference by Score System for 1942.

The team played its home games at Memorial Stadium in Lincoln, Nebraska.

== Before the season ==
Assistant coach Glenn Presnell was named acting football coach for the 1942 season after Biff Jones was recalled to active military service and was appointed athletic director at the United States Military Academy.

== Schedule ==
Date	Time	Opponent	Site	Result	Attendance	Source
September 26	2:00 p.m.	at Iowa*	Iowa Stadium; Iowa City, IA (rivalry)	L 0–27		
October 3	3:00 p.m.	Iowa State	Memorial Stadium; Lincoln, NE (rivalry)	W 26–0	14,472	
October 10	3:00 p.m.	Indiana*^{†}	Memorial Stadium; Lincoln, NE	L 0–12	24,000	
October 17	3:00 p.m.	No. 14 Minnesota*	Memorial Stadium; Lincoln, NE (rivalry)	L 2–15	25,000	
October 24	3:00 p.m.	at Oklahoma	Memorial Stadium; Norman, OK (rivalry)	W 7–0		
October 31	3:00 p.m.	at Kansas	Memorial Stadium; Lawrence, KS (rivalry)	W 14–7	5,187	
November 7	3:00 p.m.	Missouri	Memorial Stadium; Lincoln, NE (rivalry)	L 6–26		
November 14	1:00 p.m.	at Pittsburgh*	Pitt Stadium; Pittsburgh, PA	L 0–6	8,000	
November 21	2:00 p.m.	at Iowa Pre-Flight*	Iowa Stadium; Iowa City, IA	L 0–46	5,400	
November 28	3:00 p.m.	Kansas State	Memorial Stadium; Lincoln, NE (rivalry)	L 0–19		
*Non-conference game; ^{†}Homecoming; Rankings from AP Poll released prior to the game; All times are in Central time

== Roster ==
Athey, Marvin #41 HB; Bachman, Forrest #11 C Bradley, Dale #42 HB; Bryant, William #29 G Buckley, Newman #15 C Byler, Joe #45 T Chaloupka, Melville #43 T Clark, Victor #47 E Cooper, Robert #24 QB; DeBus, William Howard #31 HB; Domeier, Dwayne #27 T Duda, Charles #22 G Eisenhart, Kerwin #17 FB; Gelwick, Dean #19 E Gissler, Bert #10 E Grubaugh, Alvin #48 G Grubaugh, Marvin #49 T Hatfield, Wilford #21 C Hazard, Frank #34 G Hazen, Jack #32 E Hennings, Glen #38 T Hewit, William #35 E Hopp, Wallace #18 FB; Hungerford, Harold #23 HB	Kathol, Gerald #12 E Kindler, Dorsey #26 T Long, Roy #33 HB; McKee, Neal #53 HB; McNutt, Robert #53 T Metheny, Fred #36 QB; Nyden, Ed #16 E Partington, Joe #20 C Peters, John #46 E Reichel, Henry #51 HB; Salisbury, Harold #63 QB; Salisbury, Randall #14 FB; Schleich, Victor #57 T Sim, Eugene #52 T Stranathan, Wayne #30 G Thompson, Marvin #44 E Thompson, Richard #13 HB; Thorne, Charles #54 E VonGoetz, Herbert #58 G Wilkins, Frank #37 G Wilson, Art #55 G Wright, Charles #56 T Wright, George #65 HB; Zikmund, Allen #59 HB

== Coaching staff ==
Name	Title	First year in this position	Years at Nebraska	Alma mater
Glenn Presnell	Head Coach	1938	1938–1942, 1946	Nebraska
Charles Armstrong		1937	1937–1942, 1944	
Adolph J. Lewandowski		1937	1937–1944	Nebraska
William Pfeiff		1942	1939, 1942	
Dale Harvey	Freshman Coach	1941	1941–1942	
Bob Devaney	Freshman Coach		1942, 1962–1972	Alma
Elmer Holm		1942	1942	
Rollie Harney	Freshman Coach		1942	

== Game summaries ==
=== Iowa ===
Nebraska at Iowa

Team	1	2	Total
Nebraska			0
• Iowa			27

- Date: September 26
- Location: Iowa Stadium • Iowa City, Iowa

Nebraska opened their season with their first wartime game, traveling to Iowa City to meet the Hawkeyes. Hopes to open the season with victory were quickly deflated as Iowa had little difficulty getting around the Cornhusker line. By the final whistle, Iowa had posted 27 unanswered points to shut out Nebraska, and had snapped their skid of eight straight losses to the Cornhuskers. It was the first time that Nebraska had been held scoreless to open the season since the 1929 0–0 tie opener against Southern Methodist, and their first shutout loss to open a season since a 0–18 blanking handed down by the Hawkeyes in 1919. Iowa made a move to narrow their series deficit, going to 8–20–3.

=== Iowa State ===
Iowa State at Nebraska

Team	1	2	Total
Iowa State			0
• Nebraska			26

- Date: October 3
- Location: Memorial Stadium • Lincoln, Nebraska
- Game attendance: 14,472

The Cornhuskers utilized much of the same forms of attack that Iowa had utilized in their win the previous week, and in doing so Nebraska took an uncharacteristic turn towards an aerial attack to befuddle the Cyclones, leaving Iowa State in disarray for much of the game. The Cornhuskers completed 11 of 16 passes and kept the Cyclones off the board to bounce back from the disappointing season opener. It was Nebraska's fourth straight win in the series as they improved to 31–5–1 against Iowa State all time.

=== Indiana ===
Indiana at Nebraska

Team	1	2	3	4	Total
• Indiana	0	6	0	6	12
Nebraska	0	0	0	0	0

- Date: October 10
- Location: Memorial Stadium • Lincoln, Nebraska
- Game attendance: 24,000

The Nebraska season started low, then high, and dropped right back into gloom when Indiana came to Lincoln and defeated Nebraska for the second time in a row, in front of the homecoming crowd. Nebraska had gone undefeated in the first five meetings of these teams, only to suffer its second loss to the Hoosiers despite a spirited defensive effort.

=== Minnesota ===
#14 Minnesota at Nebraska

Team	1	2	Total
• #14 Minnesota			15
Nebraska			2

- Date: October 17
- Location: Memorial Stadium • Lincoln, Nebraska

The #14 ranked Minnesota Golden Gophers seemed to be back to their ways, again handing Nebraska an all-too-familiar defeat. If not for a flashy blocked punt in the second quarter, with the Gophers pinned just six inches off their goal, the Cornhuskers would not even have managed the 2-point safety to avoid being blanked for the third time in four straight games. Minnesota improved to 18–4–2 over Nebraska, but had slipped to a 5–4 record and three-way tie for 19th in the AP Poll by the conclusion of the season.

=== Oklahoma ===
Nebraska at Oklahoma

Team	1	2	Total
• Nebraska			7
Oklahoma			0

- Date: October 24
- Location: Oklahoma Memorial Stadium • Norman, Oklahoma

After a very disappointing opening stretch to the 1942 season, the Cornhuskers found a bright spot and darkened the spirits of Oklahoma by handing the Sooners a shutout loss in Norman, the first home opening loss to be suffered by Oklahoma in eighteen years. Nebraska was able to taste some victory and enjoy their 4th straight win in the series, improving to 16–3–3 over the Sooners to date. This win marked Nebraska's 300th program victory of all time.

=== Kansas ===
Nebraska at Kansas

Team	1	2	3	4	Total
• Nebraska	0	0	0	14	14
Kansas	0	0	0	7	7

- Date: October 31
- Location: Memorial Stadium • Lawrence, Kansas

This game was a back and forth affair with neither team able to put points up until only ten minutes remained. Finally, Nebraska's third-string quarterback provided the spark to produce points. The Jayhawks responded in kind once, but could not answer Nebraska's second touchdown. Kansas saw their record run of futility stretch to 26 straight games without a win against the Cornhuskers, as they fell to 9–37–3 in the series.

=== Missouri ===
Missouri at Nebraska

Team	1	2	Total
• Missouri			26
Nebraska			6

- Date: November 7
- Location: Memorial Stadium • Lincoln, Nebraska

Missouri overcame Nebraska's single early game score to steadily run up the points and easily pull away from the Cornhuskers. Although both teams had fifteen first downs, and despite Nebraska not lagging far behind with 325 overall yards compared to Missouri's 390, the game was not as close as some statistics might imply. Husker quarterback Roy Long accounted for 258 all purpose yards, setting a new quarterback single-game national record. The Tigers kept the Missouri-Nebraska Bell for another season, enjoying their tenth win against Nebraska all time in 36 meetings.

=== Pittsburgh ===
Nebraska at Pittsburgh

Team	1	2	3	4	Total
Nebraska	0	0	0	0	0
• Pittsburgh	6	0	0	0	6

- Date: November 14
- Location: Pitt Stadium • Pittsburgh
- Game attendance: 8,000

Nebraska's rough fortunes so far this season may have caused some to not hope for much success at Pitt Stadium against longtime nemesis Pittsburgh. The Cornhuskers came out strong, and their stiff defensive effort produced a tipped Panther pass in the first quarter that unfortunately redirected the ball into the hands of another Pitt receiver. The result was the first points of the game, but Nebraska allowed no others. The Cornhuskers produced successful drives, twice pulling up to the Panther six yard line before being turned away on downs, and accumulated 15 first downs on the day compared to only 6 for Pittsburgh while holding the time of possession advantage. For all those stats and efforts, the Cornhuskers were never able to actually score, allowing the one first-quarter Panther touchdown to carry the game. Nebraska fell to 3–11–3 in the series.

=== Iowa Pre-Flight ===
Nebraska at Iowa Pre-Flight

Team	1	2	Total
Nebraska			0
• Iowa Pre-Flight			46

- Date: November 21
- Location: Iowa Stadium • Iowa City, Iowa

As the United States had entered World War II, five "service teams" joined the college football landscape in 1942. With so many former college players to choose from, condensed into those five teams, the service team rosters contained a disproportionate number of former stars and all-Americans. One of those teams was the Iowa Pre-Flight Seahawks, affiliated with the University of Iowa, and so it was that the Cornhuskers returned to Iowa Stadium for the second time of the season. Even at full strength, Nebraska would have faced long odds, but the Cornhusker roster was so short due to injuries that a tackle had been moved into the starting fullback position. The outcome was never in doubt, as the Seahawks rolled up and down the field at will and kept Nebraska from ever finding the scoreboard. It was the worst ever defeat for Nebraska to date, as no other team had ever scored so many points or won by such a large margin of victory in the 50-year history of the program, supplanting the previous record 0–40 loss to Pittsburgh in 1931. This was the only game ever played between the teams, denying Nebraska any opportunity of payback.

=== Kansas State ===
Kansas State at Nebraska

Team	1	2	Total
• Kansas State			19
Nebraska			0

- Date: November 28
- Location: Memorial Stadium • Lincoln, Nebraska

Nebraska ended the 1942 season on another down note, dropping another shutout loss, this time to Kansas State in Lincoln. It was the 2nd win in a row and just the 4th win overall against the Cornhuskers for the Wildcats in all 27 tries. This loss also set a new record for consecutive losses to close a season, the four closing losses exceeding the record of the three losses posted to close the 1899 campaign.

== After the season ==
The 1942 season ended as one of the worst seasons in program history. It was only the second time ever that Nebraska dropped seven games in a single season, the previous being the bleak 1–7–1 record from the A. Edwin Branch's single season at the top in 1899. While the cause of these disappointments could be attributed to the personnel changes at the top, the depleted roster, or the high number of injuries, the numbers posted for the 1942 season were no less of a disappointment. Coach Presnell subsequently stepped down after just one year, and assistant Adolph J. Lewandowski assumed the role of head football coach and also athletic director. Presnell's single season career at Nebraska was the second-worst in the program's history to date, which contributed to the football team's overall record slipping to 301–110–31 (.716), as the conference tally also fell, to 107–19–11 (.821).
