= Bill Campbell (gridiron football) =

American gridiron football player (1920–1974)

No. 21, 53, 14, 55, 32
- Positions: Center, linebacker, tackle

Personal information
- Born: August 6, 1920; Pawhuska, Oklahoma, U.S.
- Died: October 28, 1974 (aged 54); Tulsa, Oklahoma, U.S.
- Listed height: 6 ft 0 in (1.83 m)
- Listed weight: 195 lb (88 kg)

Career information
- High school: Pawhuska
- College: Oklahoma (1939–1942)
- NFL draft: 1943: 17th round, 153rd overall pick

Career history
- Chicago Cardinals (1945–1948); New York Bulldogs (1949); Chicago Cardinals (1949); Winnipeg Blue Bombers (1951)

Awards and highlights
- NFL champion (1947); Second-team All-Big Six (1942)

Career NFL statistics
- Games played: 38
- Games started: 12
- Fumble recoveries: 1
- Stats at Pro Football Reference

William Roscoe Campbell (August 6, 1920 – October 28, 1974) was an American professional football player who played five seasons in the National Football League (NFL) with the Chicago Cardinals and New York Bulldogs. He was selected by the Cardinals in the 17th round of the 1943 NFL draft after playing college football at the University of Oklahoma. Campbell also played for the Winnipeg Blue Bombers of the Western Interprovincial Football Union

== Early life and college ==
William Roscoe Campbell was born on August 6, 1920, in Pawhuska, Oklahoma. He attended Pawhuska High School in Pawhuska.

Campbell was a member of the Oklahoma Sooners from 1939 to 1942 and a three-year letterman from 1940 to 1942. He was named second-team All-Big Six Conference by the Associated Press in 1942. He served in the United States Army Air Forces during World War II.

== Professional career ==
Campbell was selected by the Chicago Cardinals in the 17th round, with the 153rd overall pick, of the 1943 NFL draft. He signed with the Cardinals in 1945. He played in six games, starting two, for the team during the 1945 season. He appeared in all 11 games, starting seven, in 1946, recording one kick return for 17 yards and one fumble recovery. Campbell played in four games, starting one, during the 1947 season. He also started for the Cardinals in the 1947 NFL Championship Game, a 28–21 victory over the Philadelphia Eagles. Campbell appeared in seven games, starting two, for the Cardinals in 1948.

Campbell was traded to the New York Bulldogs in 1949. He played in four games for the Bulldogs before being released.

He was then re-signed by the Cardinals on November 1, 1949. He then appeared in six games for the Cardinals during the 1949 season. Campbell became a free agent after the season.

Campbell played in ten games for the Winnipeg Blue Bombers of the Western Interprovincial Football Union in 1951.

== Death ==
Campbell died on October 28, 1974, in Tulsa, Oklahoma.
