= 1942 Missouri Tigers football team =

American college football season

1942 Missouri Tigers football

Big 6 champion
- Conference: Big Six Conference
- Record: 8–3–1 (4–0–1 Big 6)
- Head coach: Don Faurot (8th season)
- Home stadium: Memorial Stadium

1942 Big Six Conference football standings
	Conf.					Overall
Team	W		L		T	W		L		T
Missouri $	4	–	0	–	1	8	–	3	–	1
Oklahoma	3	–	1	–	1	3	–	5	–	2
Nebraska	3	–	2	–	0	3	–	7	–	0
Kansas State	2	–	3	–	0	3	–	8	–	0
Iowa State	1	–	4	–	0	3	–	6	–	0
Kansas	1	–	4	–	0	2	–	8	–	0
$ – Conference champion

The 1942 Missouri Tigers football team was an American football team that represented the University of Missouri in the Big Six Conference (Big 6) during the 1942 college football season. The team compiled an 8–3–1 record (4–0–1 against Big 6 opponents), won the Big 6 championship, and outscored all opponents by a combined total of 288 to 107. The team played its home games at Memorial Stadium in Columbia, Missouri.

The team's leading scorer was Bob Steuber with 121 points, a scoring title that remained a Missouri record for 65 years until Jeff Wolfert scored 130 points in 2007.

Missouri was ranked at No. 29 (out of 590 college and military teams) in the final rankings under the Litkenhous Difference by Score System for 1942.

During the 1942 season, Don Faurot was the head coach for the eighth of 19 seasons. In June 1943, after a younger brother was reported missing in action in the Battle of the Bismarck Sea, the 41-year-old Faurot joined the United States Navy where he was commissioned as a lieutenant. A total of four Faurot brothers served in the military during World War II. Chauncey Simpson, who had been the school's head track coach and a backfield coach for the football team, was appointed to serve as "acting football coach" during Faurot's military service.

== Schedule ==
Date	Opponent	Site	Result	Attendance	Source
September 19	vs. Fort Riley*	Central High School Stadium; St. Joseph, MO	W 31–0		
September 26	Saint Louis*	Memorial Stadium; Columbia, MO	W 38–7		
October 3	Colorado*	Memorial Stadium; Columbia, MO	W 26–13	4,000	
October 10	at Wisconsin*	Camp Randall Stadium; Madison, WI	L 9–17		
October 17	at Kansas State	Memorial Stadium; Manhattan, KS	W 46–2		
October 24	Iowa State	Memorial Stadium; Columbia, MO (rivalry)	W 45–6	7,094	
October 31	Great Lakes Navy*	Sportsman's Park; St. Louis, MO	L 0–17	16,627	
November 7	at Nebraska	Memorial Stadium; Lincoln, NE (rivalry)	W 26–6		
November 14	at Oklahoma	Memorial Stadium; Norman, OK (rivalry)	T 6–6	20,000	
November 21	at Fordham*	Polo Grounds; New York, NY	L 12–20	11,000	
November 26	Kansas^{†}	Memorial Stadium; Columbia, MO (rivalry)	W 42–13	10,000	
December 5	Iowa Pre-Flight*	Ruppert Stadium; Kansas City, MO	W 7–0	7,600	
*Non-conference game; ^{†}Homecoming
