= Walt Lamb =

American football player (1920–1991)

No. 12
- Position: End

Personal information
- Born: December 21, 1920; Ardmore, Oklahoma, U.S.
- Died: January 5, 1991 (aged 70)
- Listed height: 6 ft 1 in (1.85 m)
- Listed weight: 195 lb (88 kg)

Career information
- High school: Ardmore
- College: Oklahoma (1939–1942)
- NFL draft: 1943: 10th round, 89th overall pick

Career history
- Chicago Bears (1946)

Awards and highlights
- NFL champion (1946); First-team All-Big Six (1942)

Career NFL statistics
- Receptions: 1
- Receiving yards: 10
- Stats at Pro Football Reference

Walter G. "Dub" Lamb (December 21, 1920 – January 5, 1991) was an American professional football end who played one season with the Chicago Bears of the National Football League (NFL). He was selected by the Bears in the tenth round of the 1943 NFL draft after playing college football at the University of Oklahoma.

== Early life and college ==
Walter G. Lamb was born on December 21, 1920, in Ardmore, Oklahoma. He attended Ardmore High School in Ardmore.

Lamb was a member of the Oklahoma Sooners from 1939 to 1942 and a three-year letterman from 1940 to 1942. He was named first-team All-Big Six by both the Associated Press and United Press his senior year in 1942.

== Professional career ==
Lamb was selected by the Chicago Bears in the 10th round, with the 89th overall pick, of the 1943 NFL draft. He served in the United States Army Air Forces during World War II. He finally signed with the Bears in 1946. Lamb played in all 11 games, starting three, for the Bears during the 1946 season, catching one pass for ten yards while also recovering one fumble. He also played in the 1946 NFL Championship Game, a 24–14 victory over the New York Giants. He was released in 1947.

== Personal life ==
Lamb died on January 5, 1991.
