= List of Alabama Crimson Tide in the NFL draft =

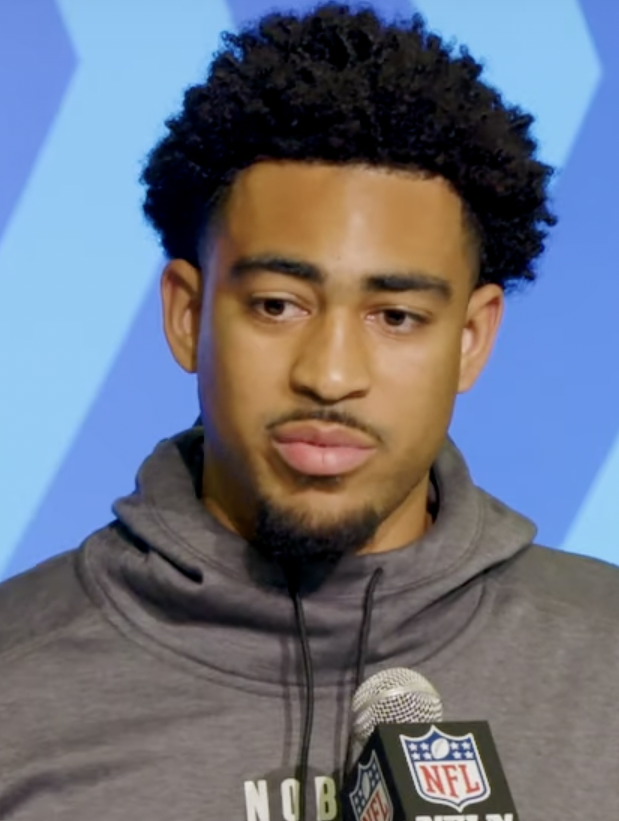
Bryce was the first overall selection in the 2023 NFL draft.

Note: Pro Bowl selections and Super Bowl wins are counted only from players drafted by the University of Alabama. Super Bowl winning players are selected from the active 53-man roster on the day of the Super Bowl or if they were considered a starter before being placed on Injury Reserve/Report.

The University of Alabama has a combined 477 total players drafted from the National Football League (NFL), American Football League (AFL), and (NFL) supplemental draft. (Note: Because of the NFL–AFL merger agreement, the history of the AFL is officially recognized by the NFL and therefore this list includes the AFL draft (1960–1966) and the common draft (1967–1969).) Of these players 429 have been drafted into the National Football League (NFL) since the league began holding drafts in 1936. This includes 86 players taken in the first round and three overall number one picks, Harry Gilmer in the 1948 NFL draft, Joe Namath in the 1965 AFL draft and Bryce Young in the 2023 NFL draft. The University of Alabama has had 56 former players selected to a Pro Bowl, 164 Pro Bowl selections over all, 6 players honored as the leagues NFL Most Valuable Player, NFL Offensive Player of the Year, or NFL Defensive Player of the Year with 9 total selections (5 MVP, 3 Offensive Player of the Year, and 1 NFL Defensive Player of the Year), 52 former players selected 1st Team All-Pro, 53 former players have won a (NFL championship or Super Bowl) with their respective teams (70 times represented and won), and 8 players have been elected to the Pro Football Hall of Fame.

Each NFL franchise seeks to add new players through the annual NFL draft. The draft rules were last updated in 2009. The team with the worst record the previous year picks first, the next-worst team second, and so on. Teams that did not make the playoffs are ordered by their regular-season record with any remaining ties broken by strength of schedule. Playoff participants are sequenced after non-playoff teams, based on their round of elimination (wild card, division, conference, and Super Bowl). Prior to the merger agreements in 1966, the American Football League (AFL) operated in direct competition with the NFL and held a separate draft. This led to a bidding war over top prospects between the two leagues. As part of the merger agreement on June 8, 1966, the two leagues held a multiple-round "common draft". Once the AFL officially merged with the NFL in 1970, the common draft became the NFL draft.

== Selections ==
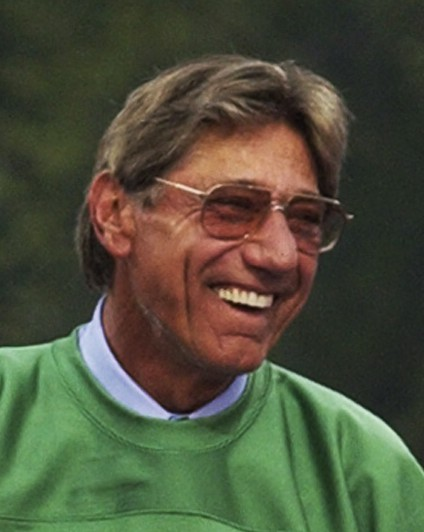
Joe Namath was the first selection in the 1965 AFL draft.

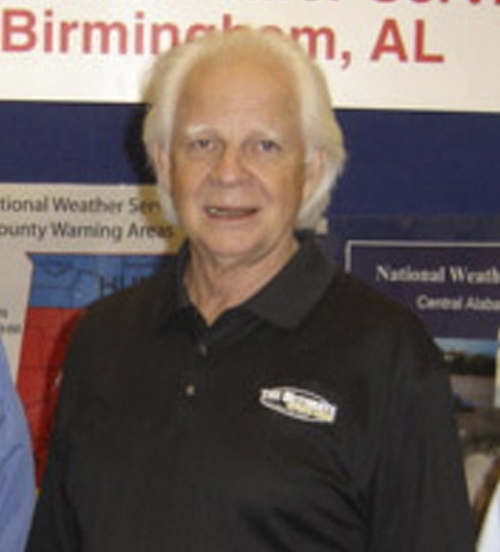
Ken Stabler was drafted 52nd overall by the Oakland Raiders in the 1968 NFL draft.

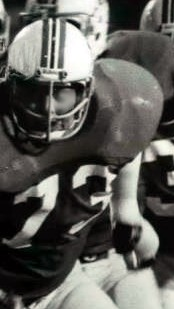
John Hannah was drafted 4th overall by the New England Patriots in the 1973 NFL draft.

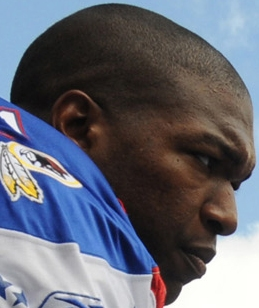
Chris Samuels was drafted 3rd overall by the Washington Redskins in the 2000 NFL draft.

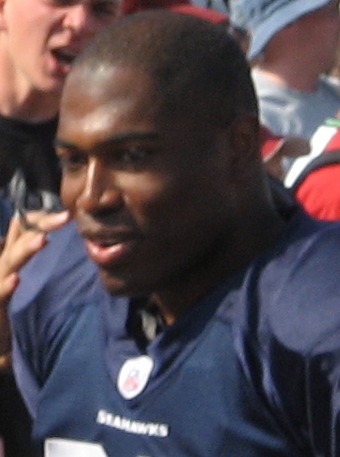
Shaun Alexander was drafted 19th overall by the Seattle Seahawks in the 2000 NFL draft.

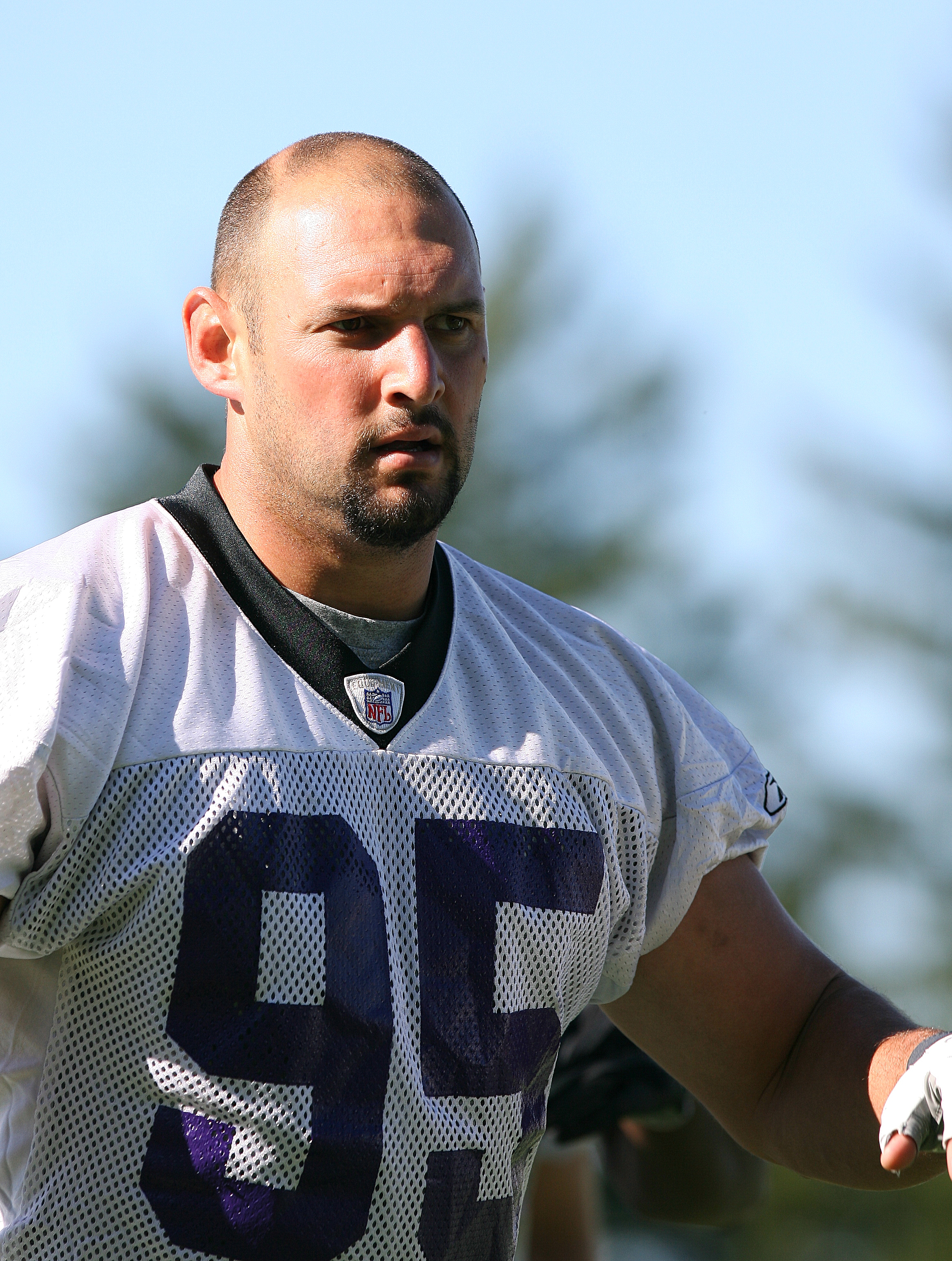
Jarret Johnson was drafted 109th overall by the Baltimore Ravens in the 2003 NFL draft.

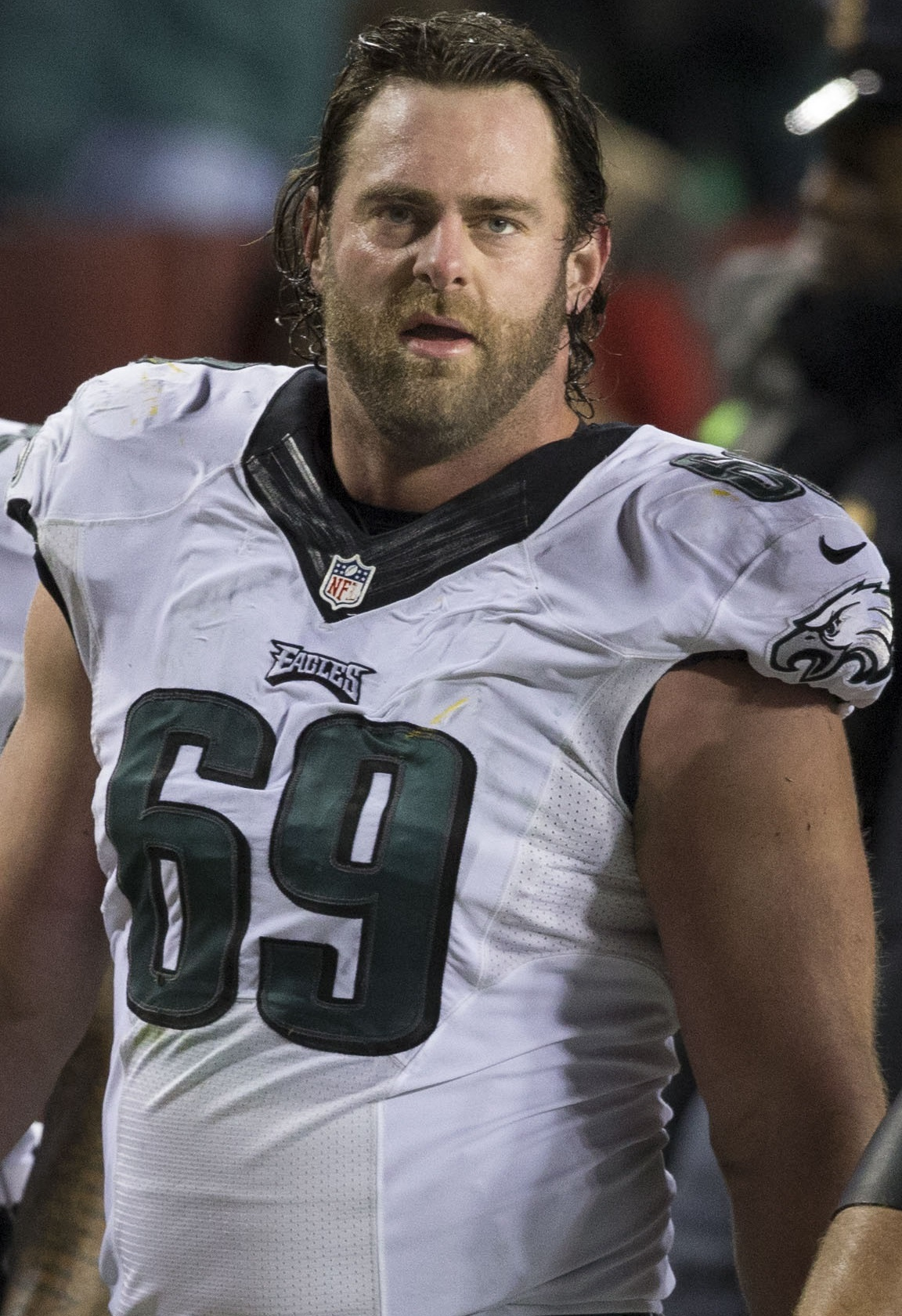
Evan Mathis was drafted 79th overall by the Carolina Panthers in the 2005 NFL draft.

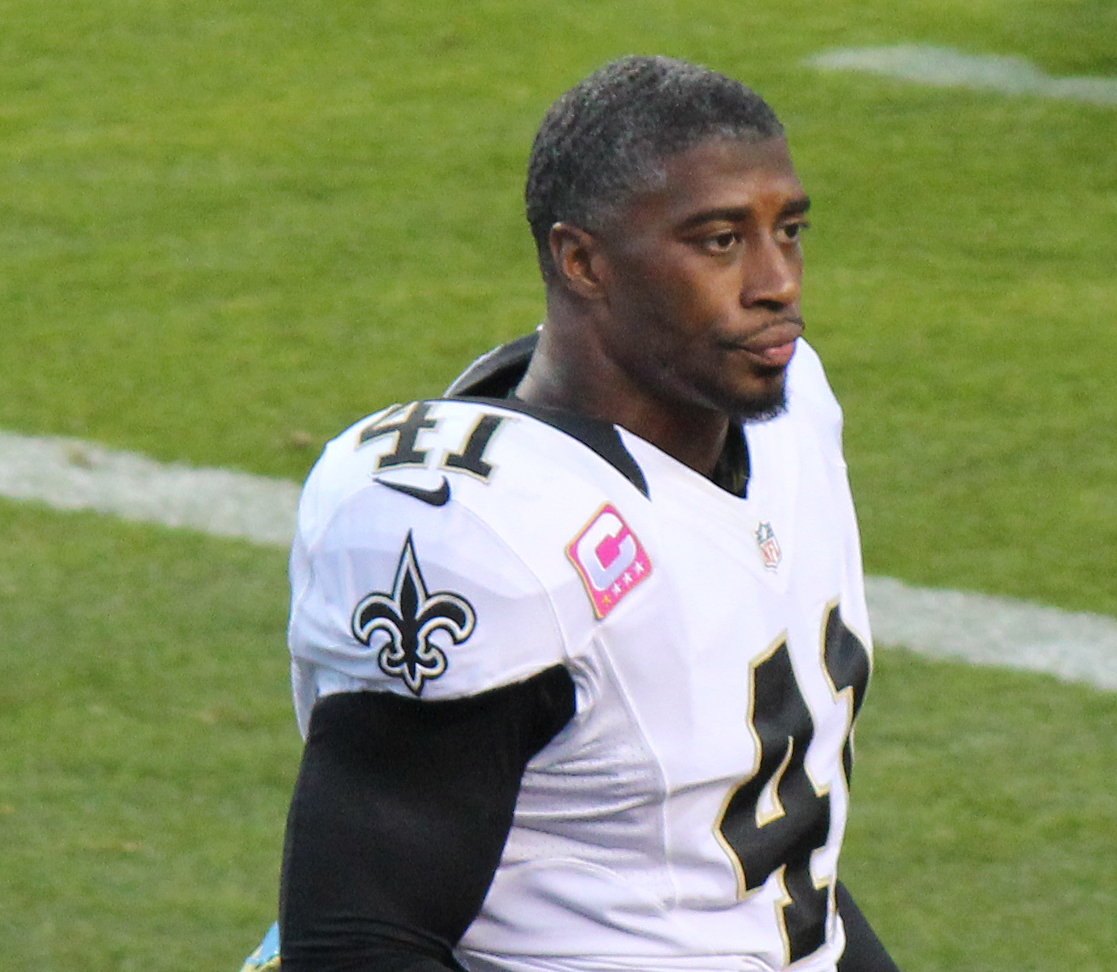
Roman Harper was drafted 43rd overall by the New Orleans Saints in the 2006 NFL draft.

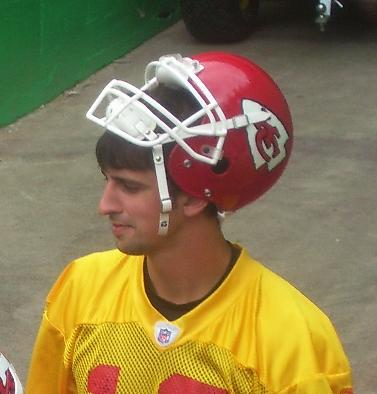
Brodie Croyle was drafted 85th overall by the Kansas City Chiefs in the 2006 NFL draft.

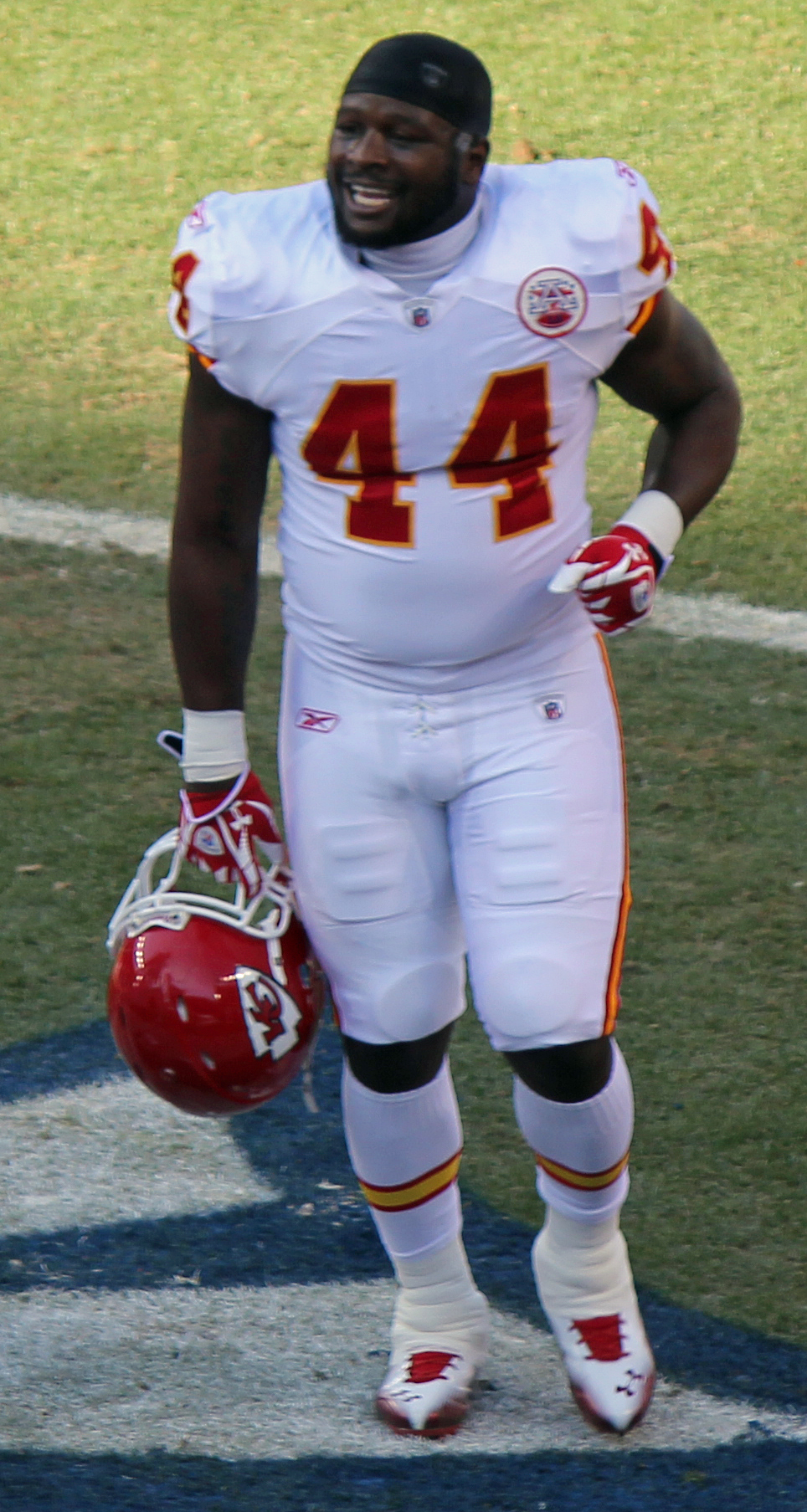
Le'Ron McClain was drafted 137th overall by the Baltimore Ravens in the 2007 NFL draft.

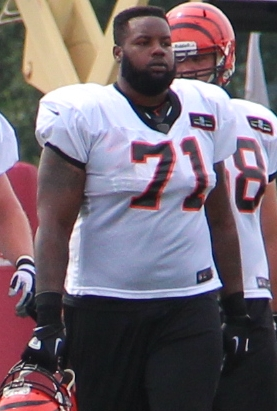
Andre Smith was drafted 6th overall by the Cincinnati Bengals in the 2009 NFL draft.

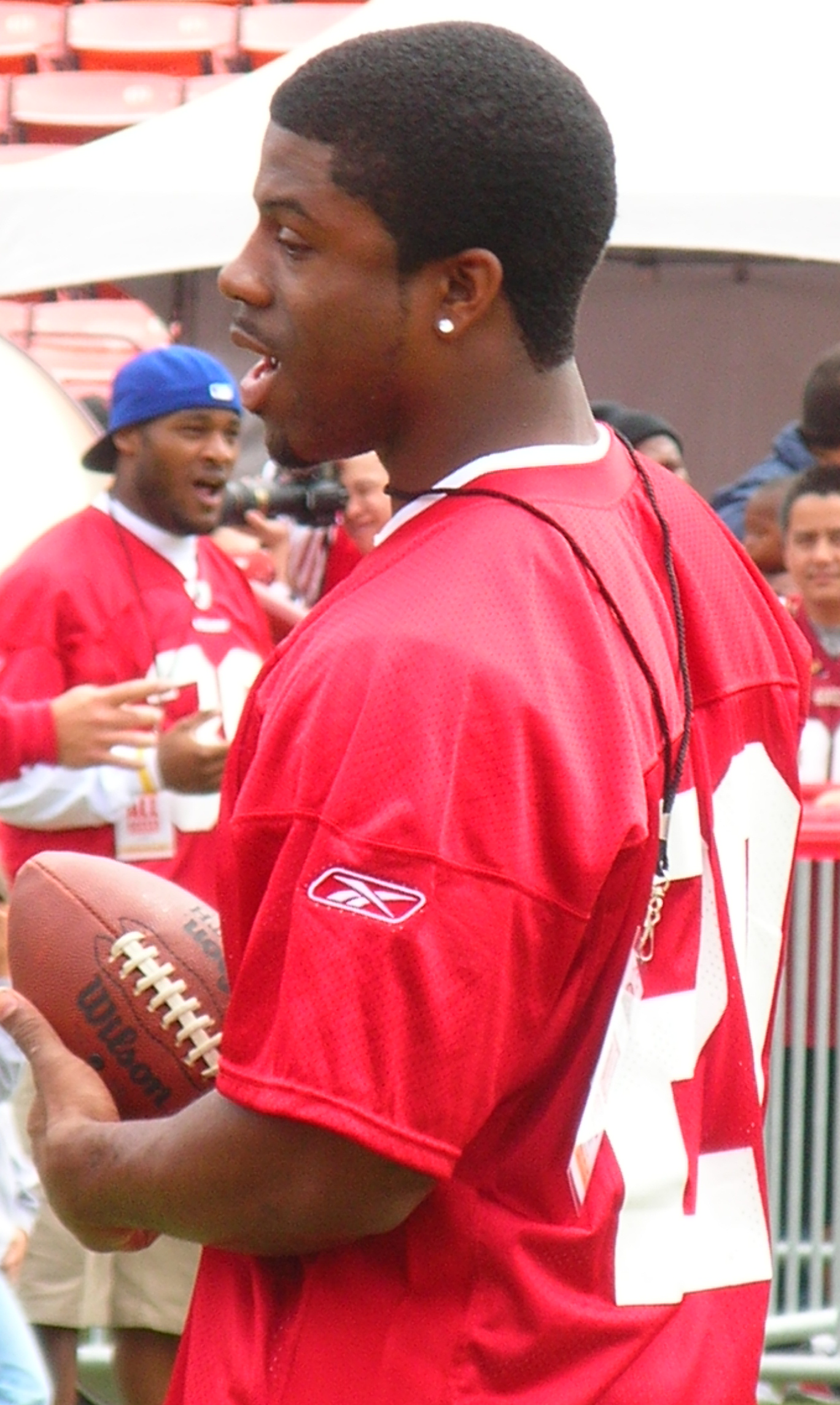
Glen Coffee was drafted 74th overall by the San Francisco 49ers in the 2009 NFL draft.

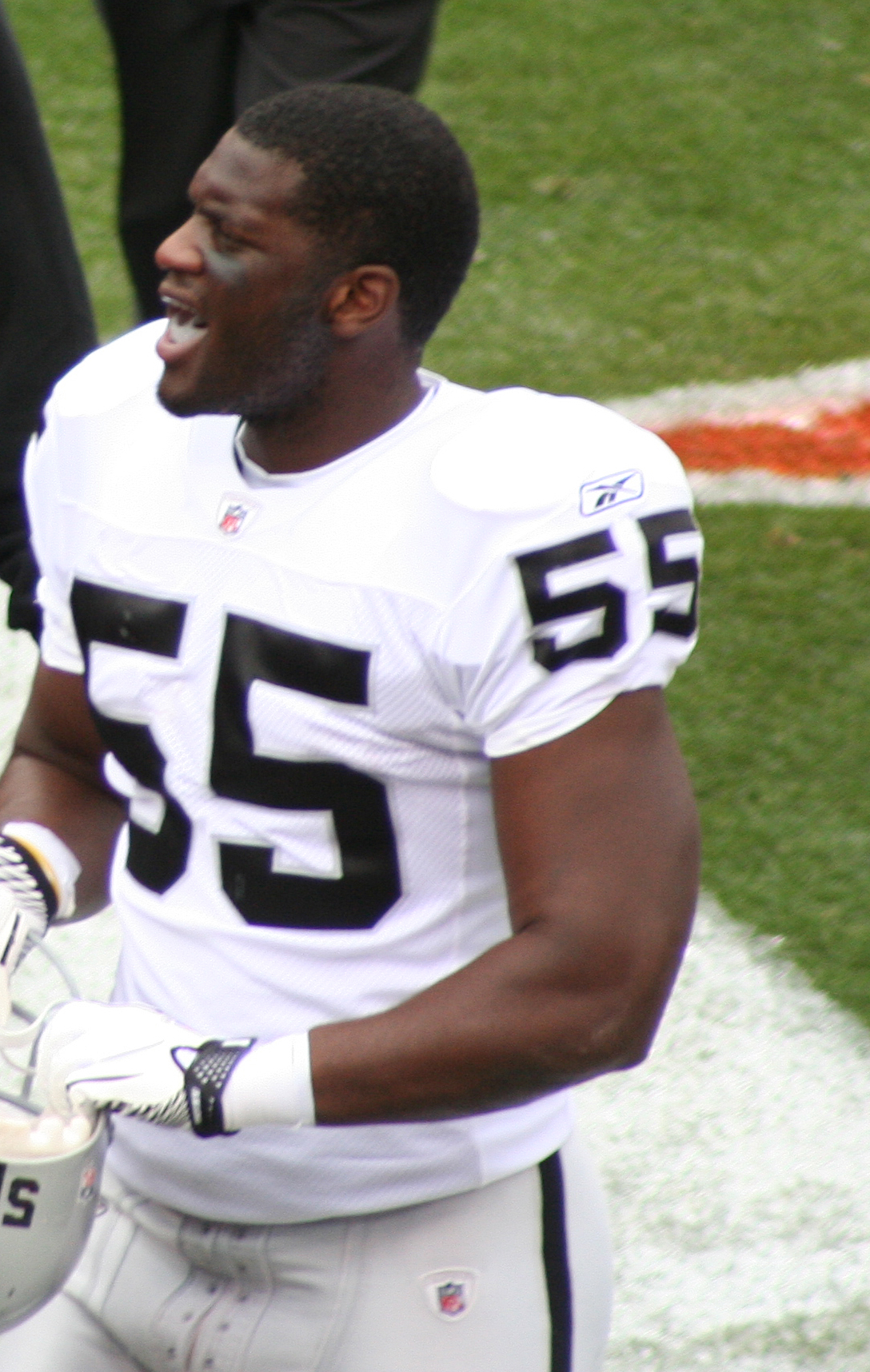
Rolando McClain was drafted 8th overall by the Oakland Raiders in the 2010 NFL draft.

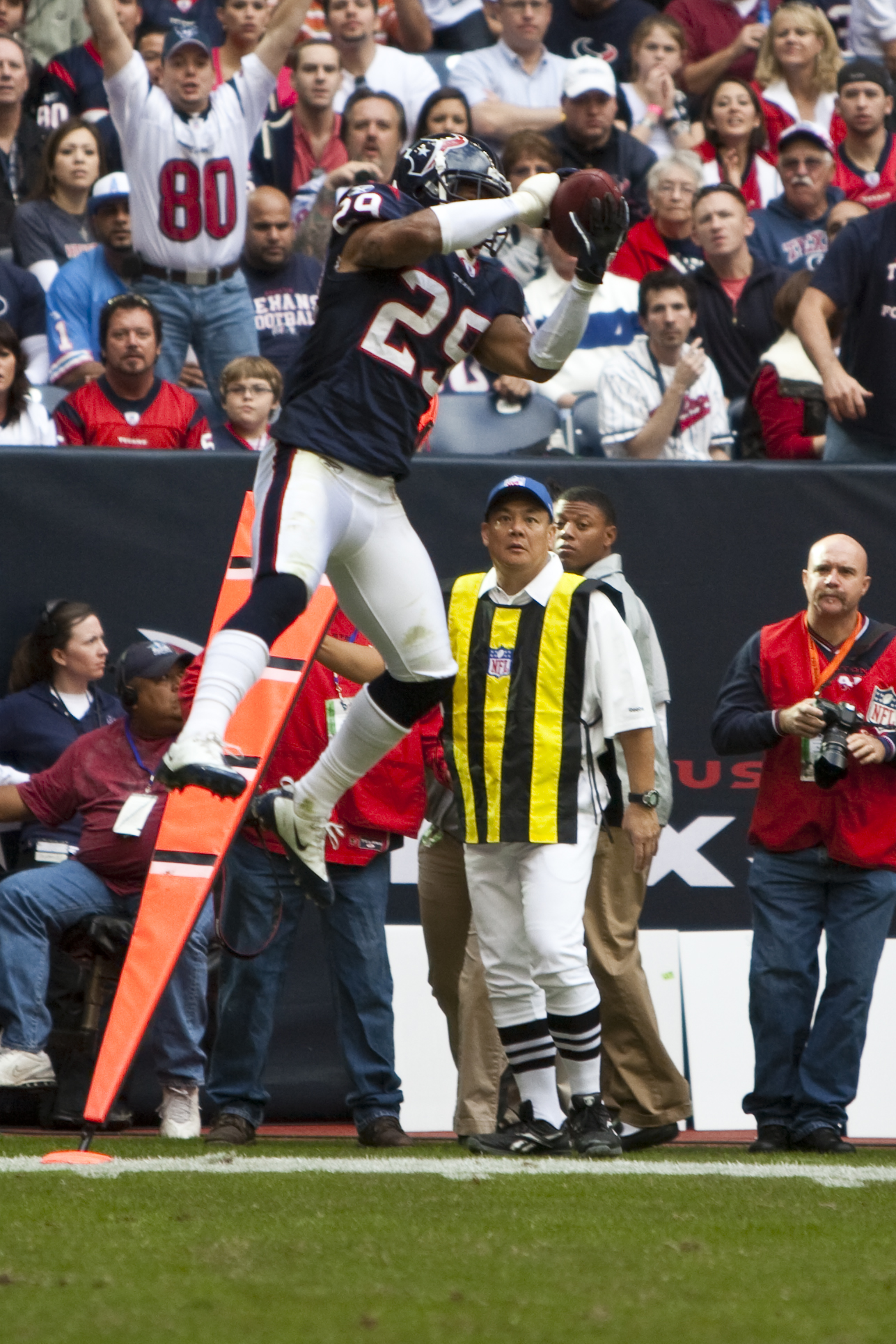
Kareem Jackson was drafted 20th overall by the Houston Texans in the 2010 NFL draft.

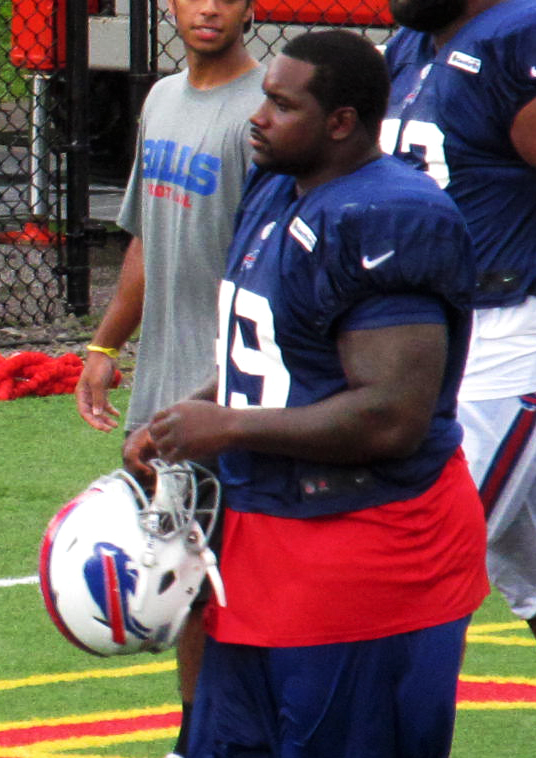
Marcell Dareus was drafted 3rd overall by the Buffalo Bills in the 2011 NFL draft.

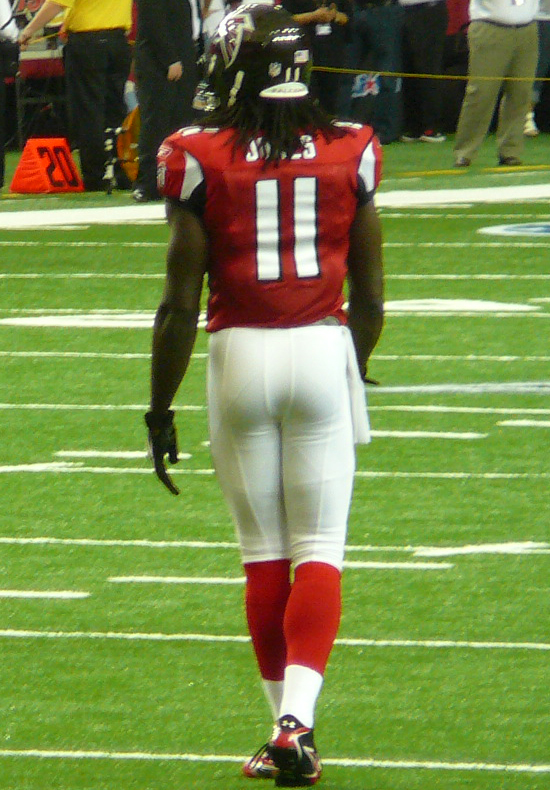
Julio Jones was drafted 6th overall by the Atlanta Falcons in the 2011 NFL draft.

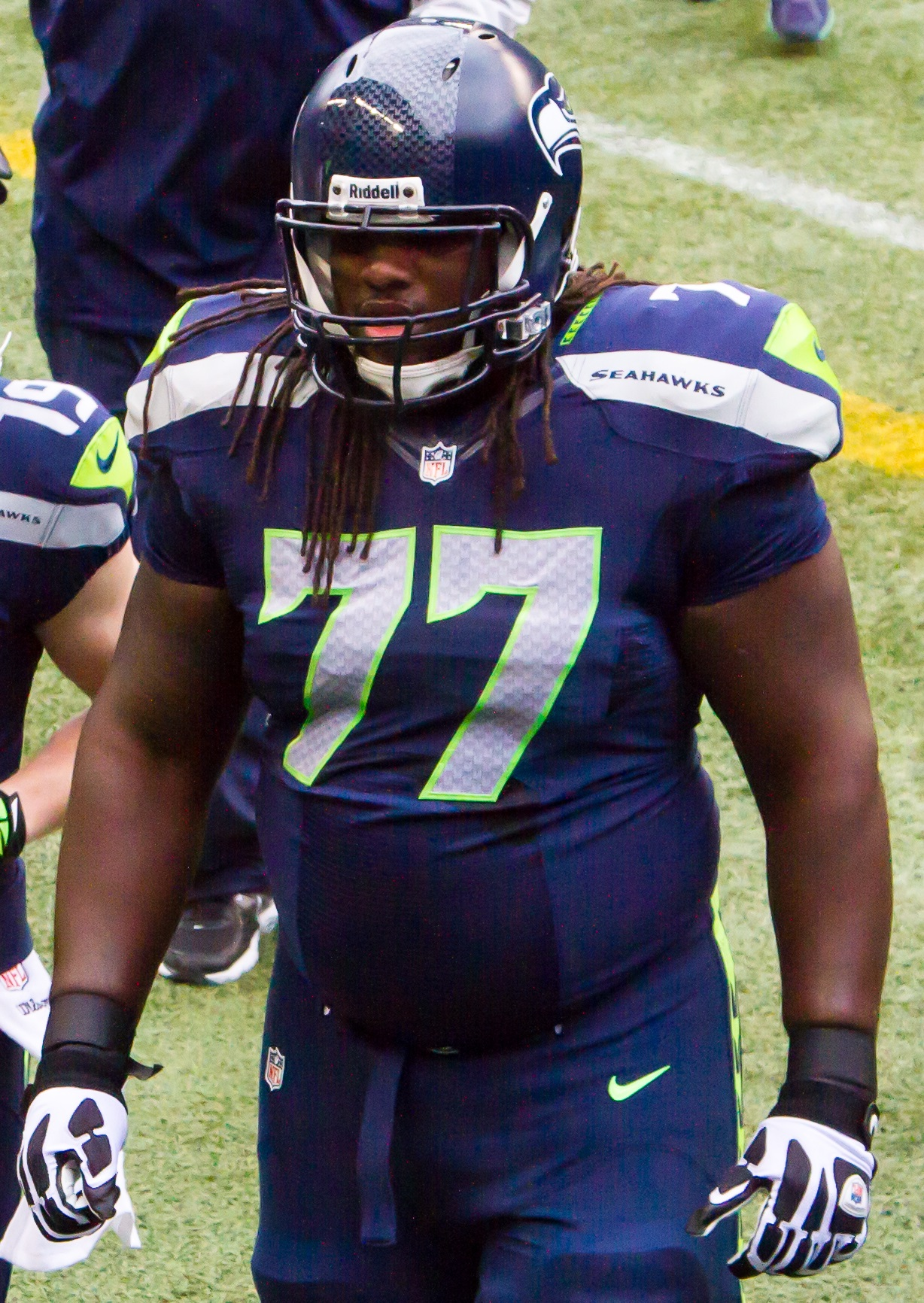
James Carpenter was drafted 25th overall by the Seattle Seahawks in the 2011 NFL draft.

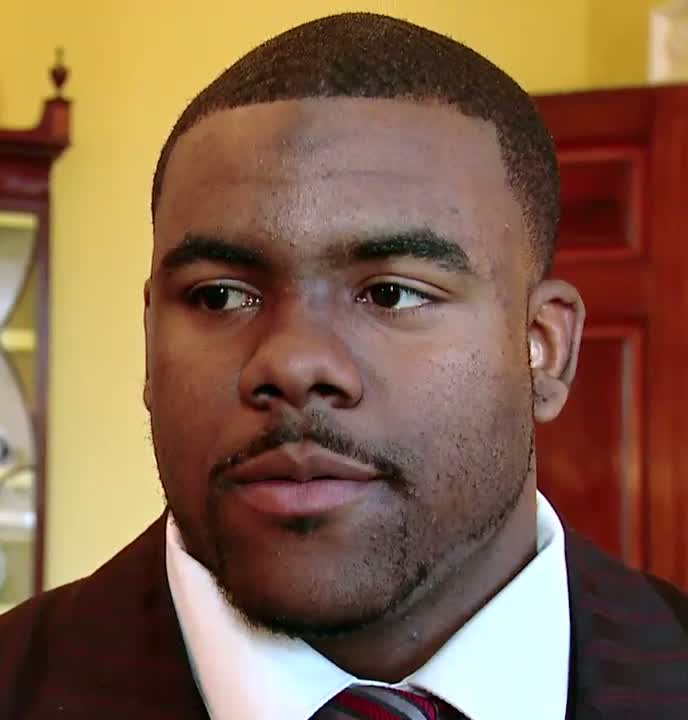
Mark Ingram II was drafted 28th overall by the New Orleans Saints in the 2011 NFL draft.

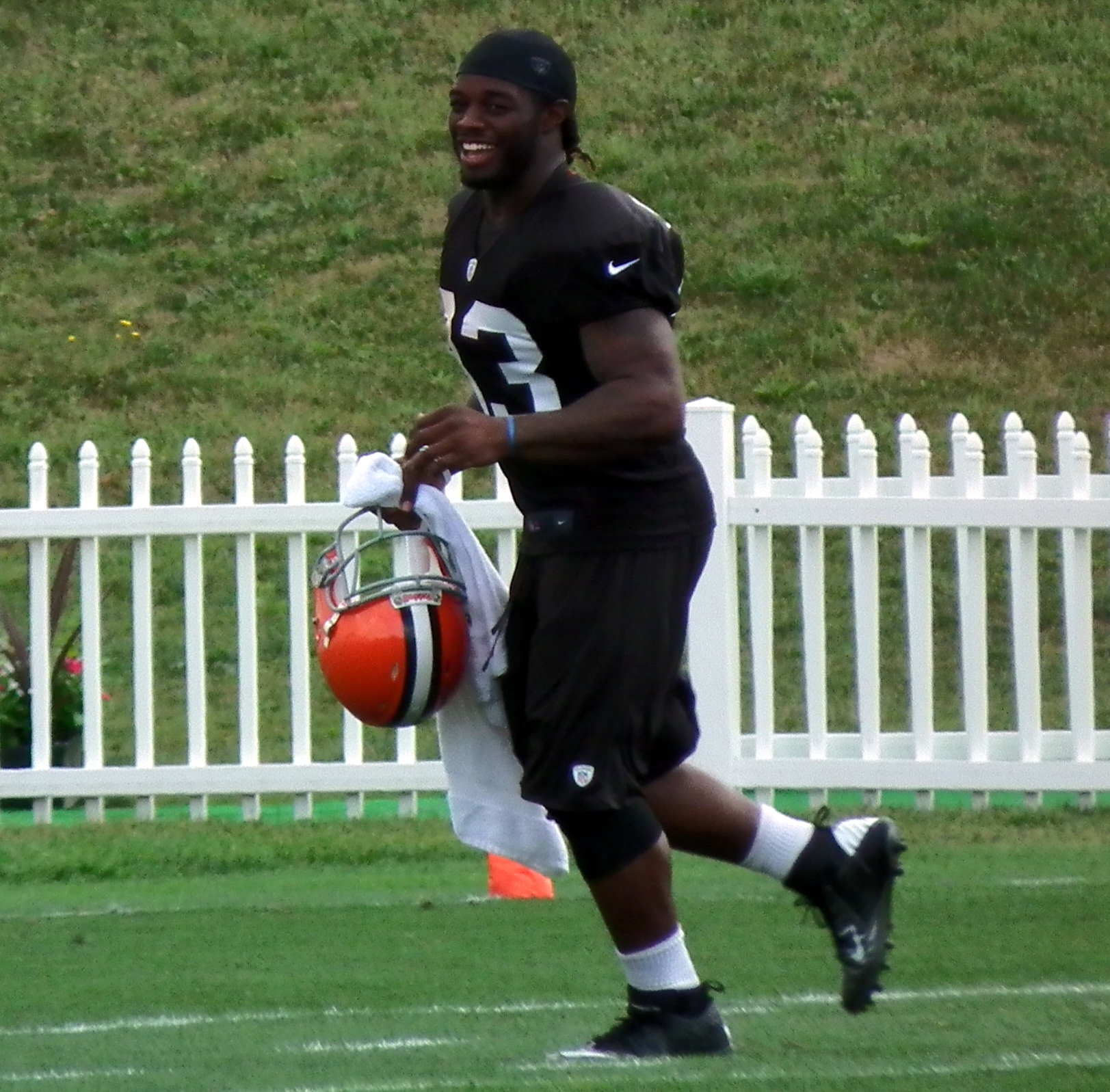
Trent Richardson was drafted 3rd overall by the Cleveland Browns in the 2012 NFL draft.

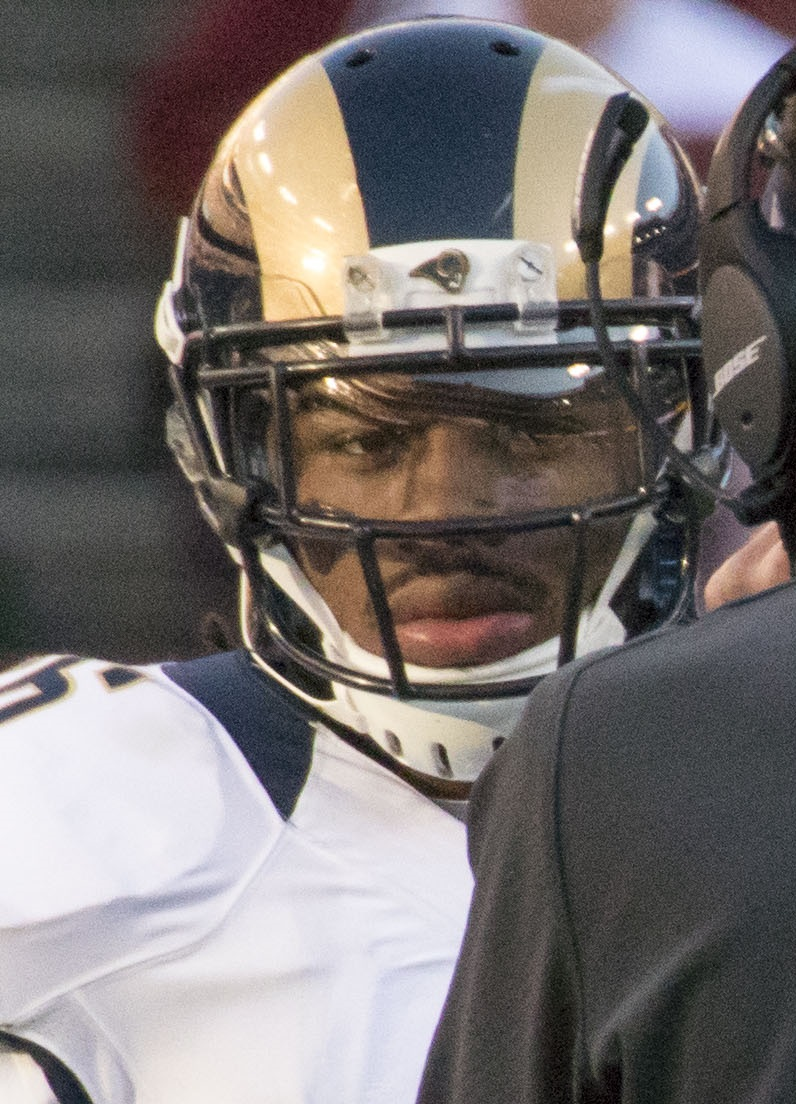
Mark Barron was drafted 7th overall by the Tampa Bay Buccaneers in the 2012 NFL draft.

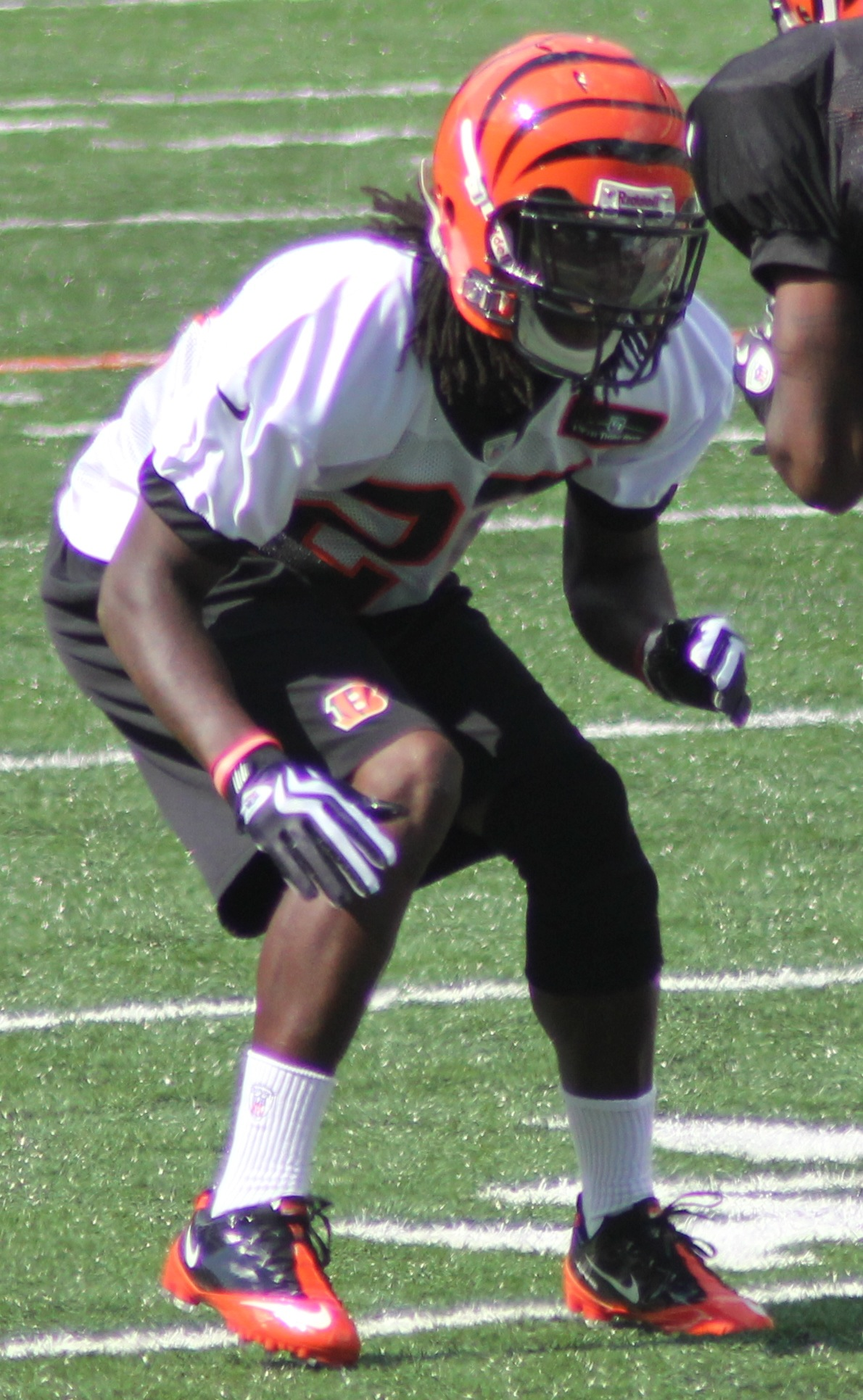
Dre Kirkpatrick was drafted 17th overall by the Cincinnati Bengals in the 2012 NFL draft.

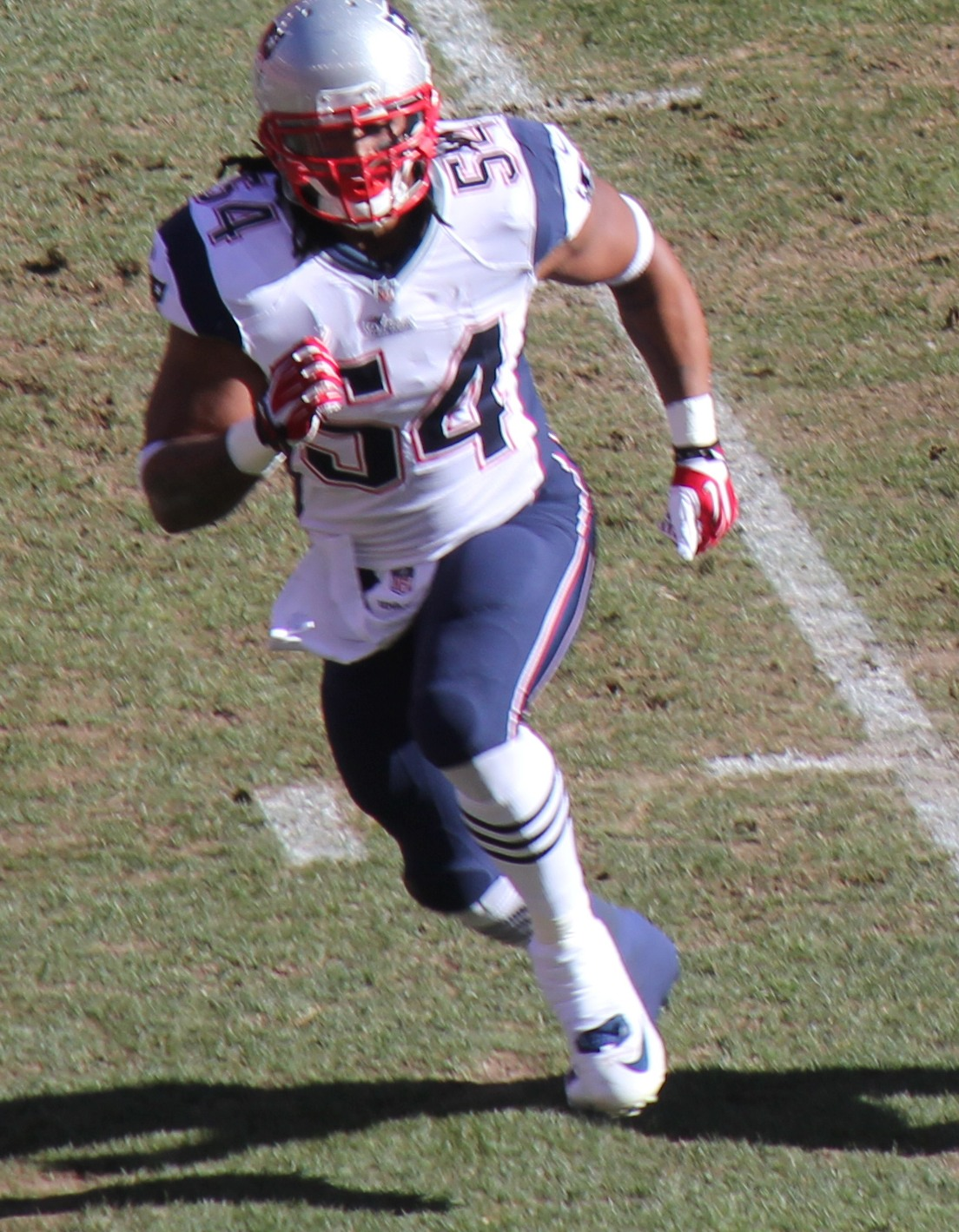
Don't'a Hightower was drafted 25th overall by the New England Patriots in the 2012 NFL draft.

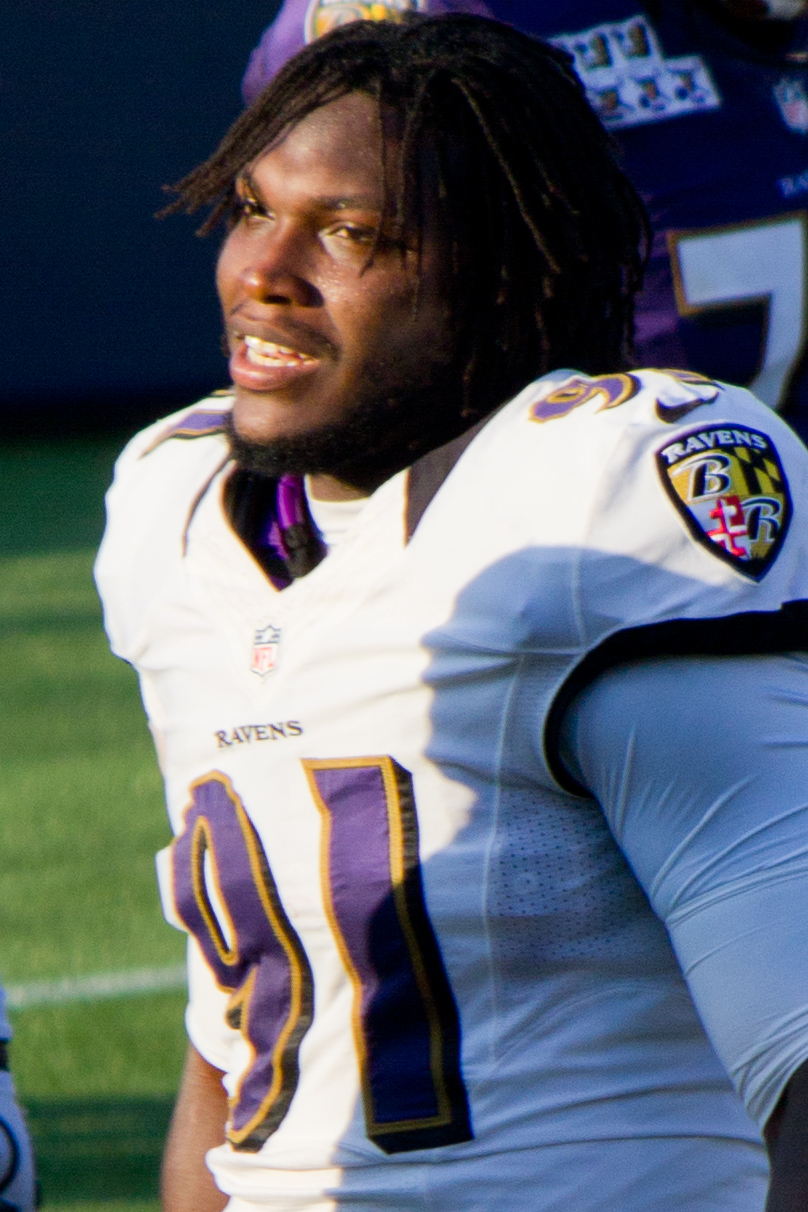
Courtney Upshaw was drafted 35th overall by the Baltimore Ravens in the 2012 NFL draft.

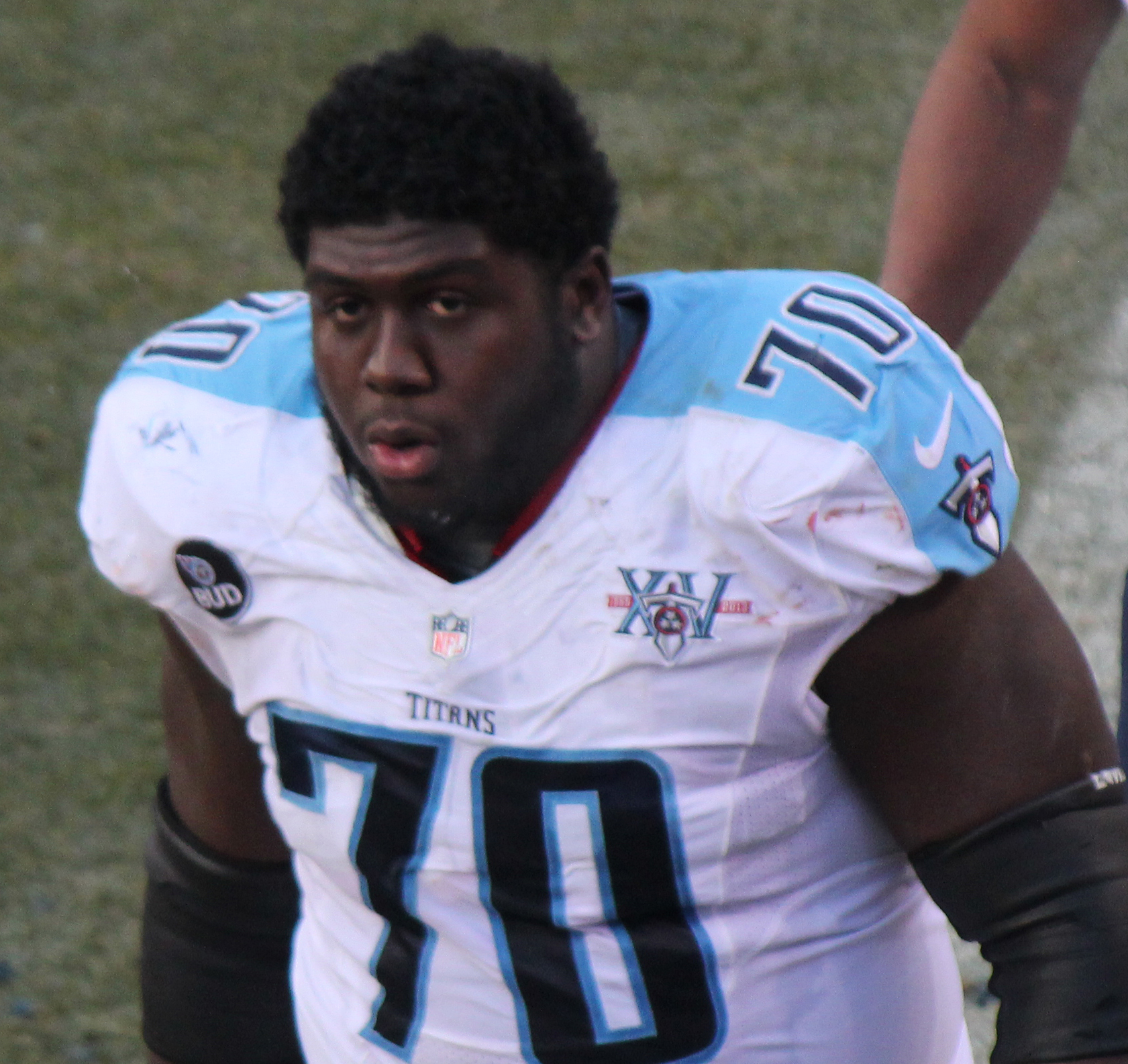
Chance Warmack was drafted 10th overall by the Tennessee Titans in the 2013 NFL draft.

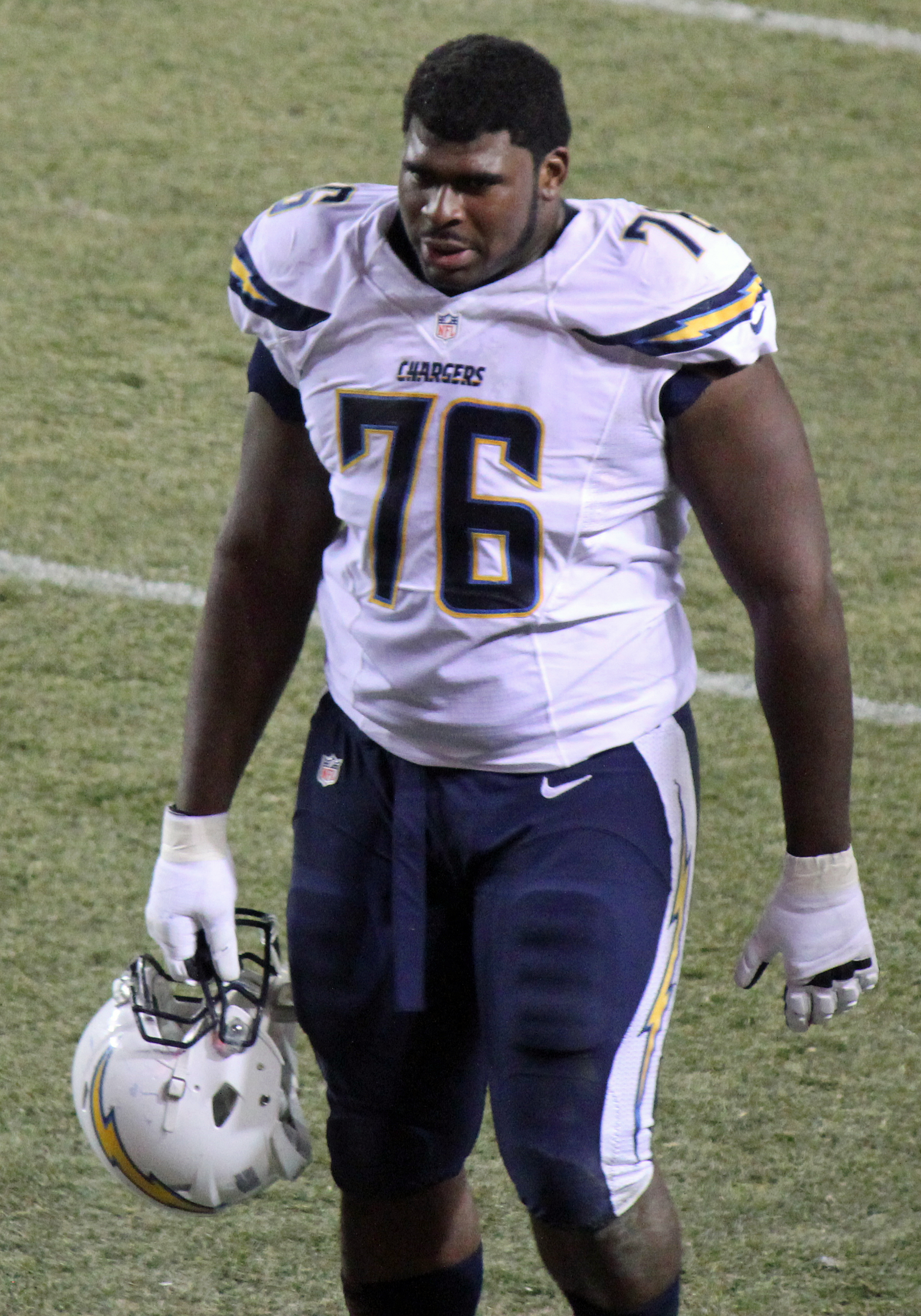
D. J. Fluker was drafted 11th overall by the San Diego Chargers in the 2013 NFL draft.

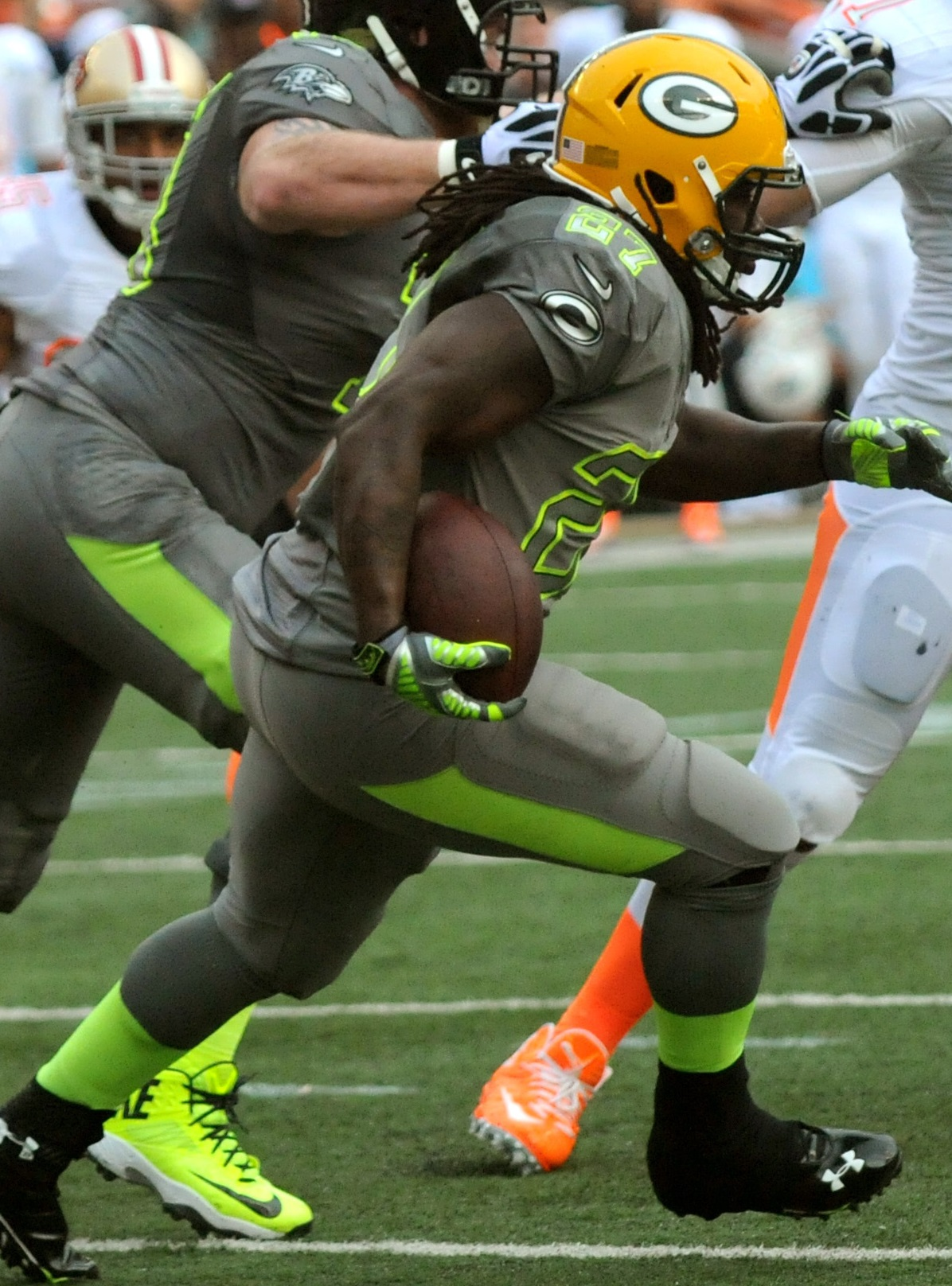
Eddie Lacy was drafted 61st overall by the Green Bay Packers in the 2013 NFL draft.

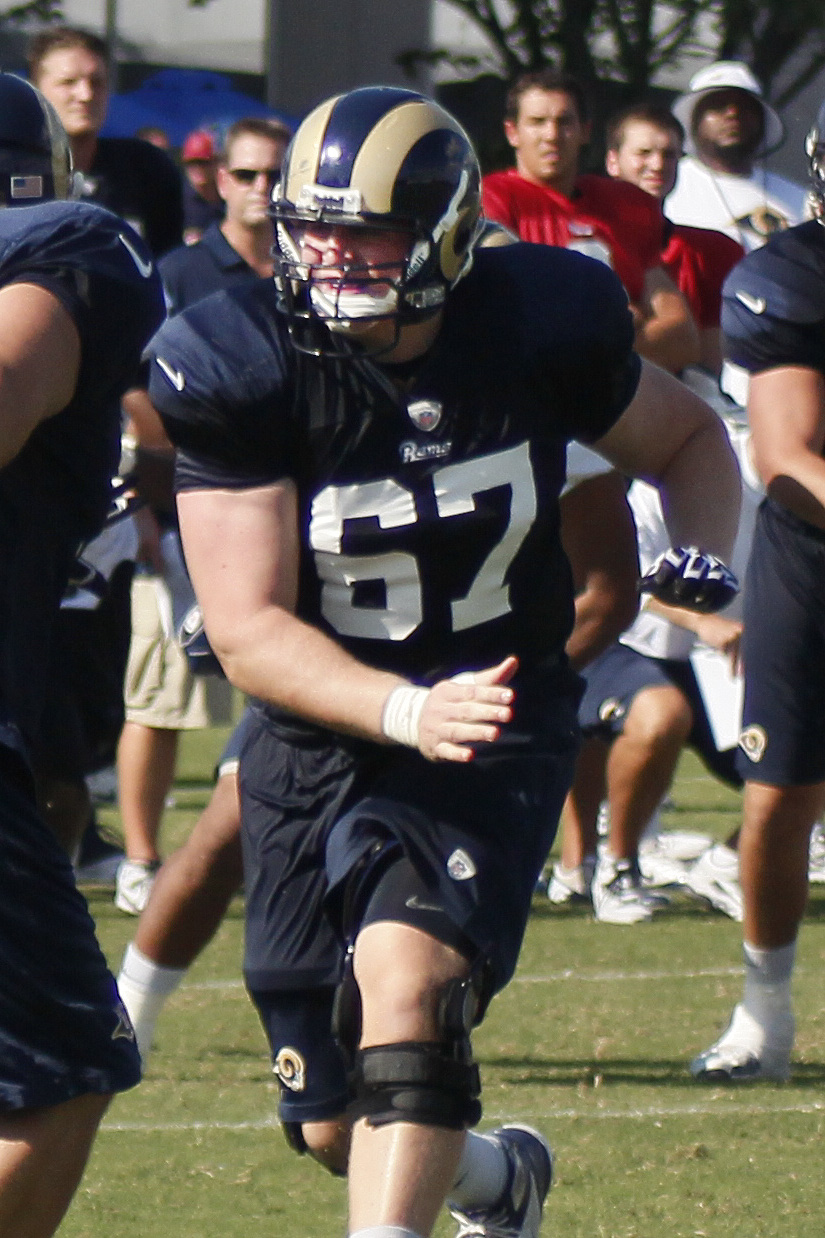
Barrett Jones was drafted 113th overall by the St. Louis Rams in the 2013 NFL draft.

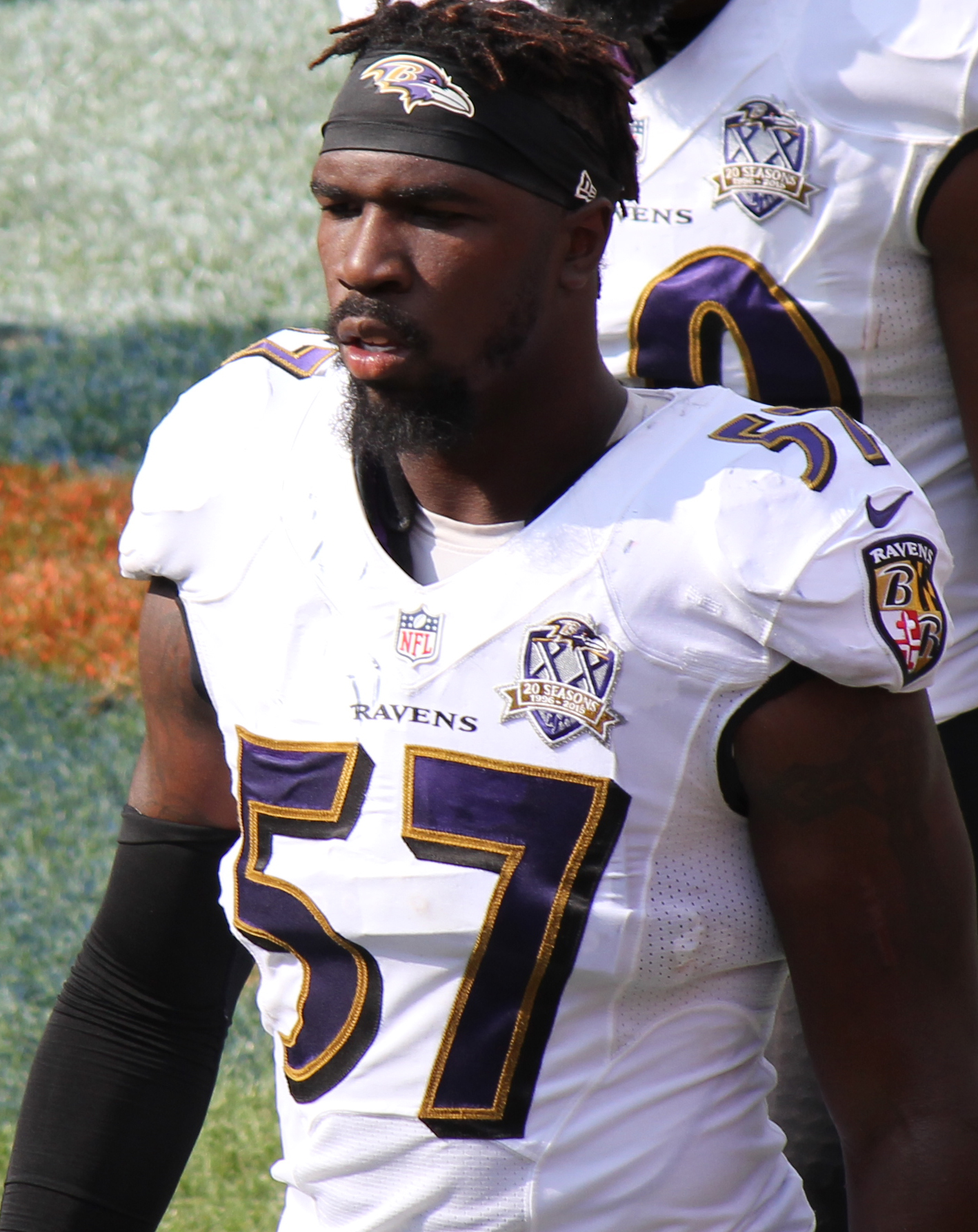
C. J. Mosley was drafted 17th overall by the Baltimore Ravens in the 2014 NFL draft.

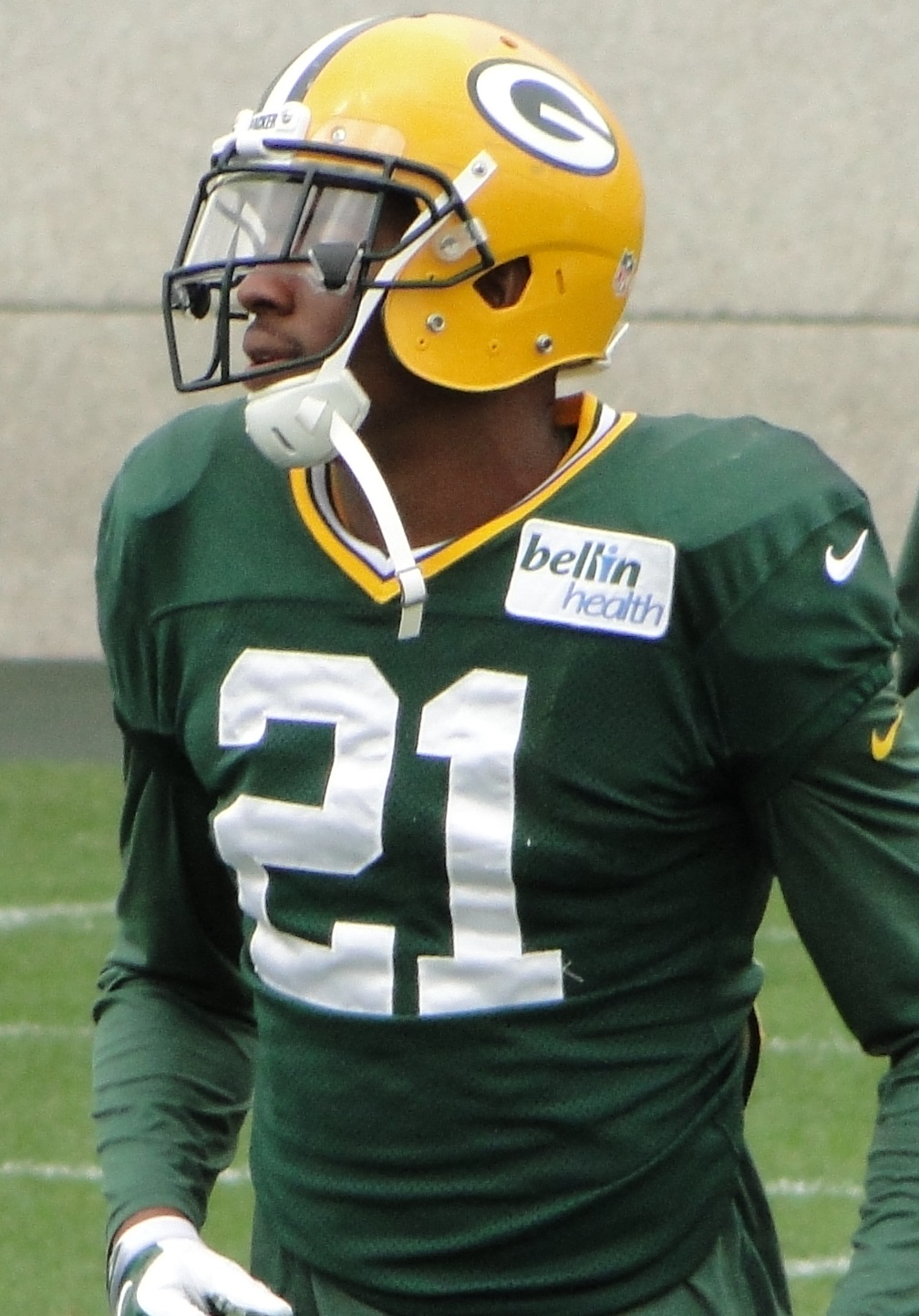
Ha Ha Clinton-Dix was drafted 21st overall by the Green Bay Packers in the 2014 NFL draft.

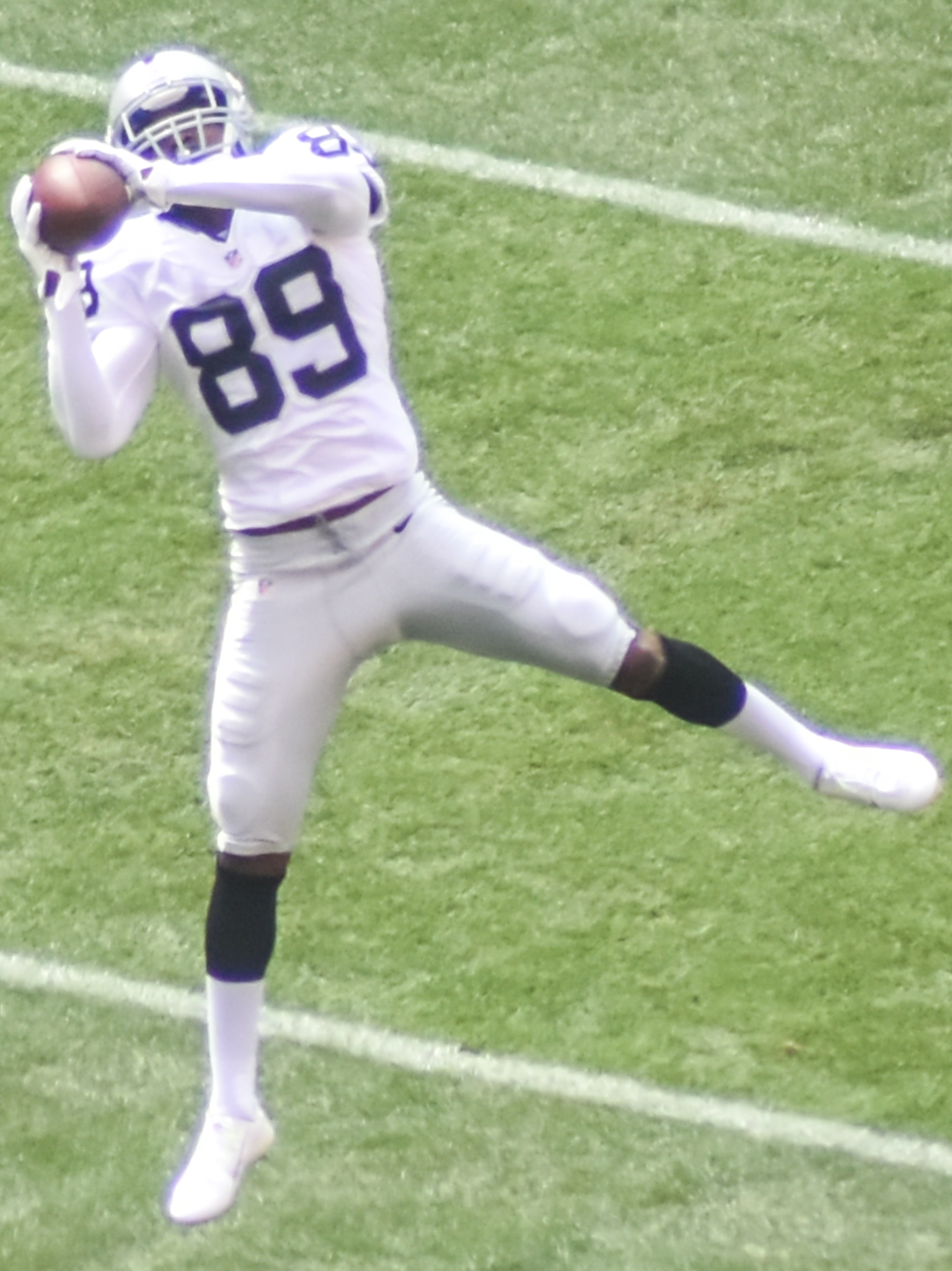
Amari Cooper was drafted 4th overall by the Oakland Raiders in the 2015 NFL draft.

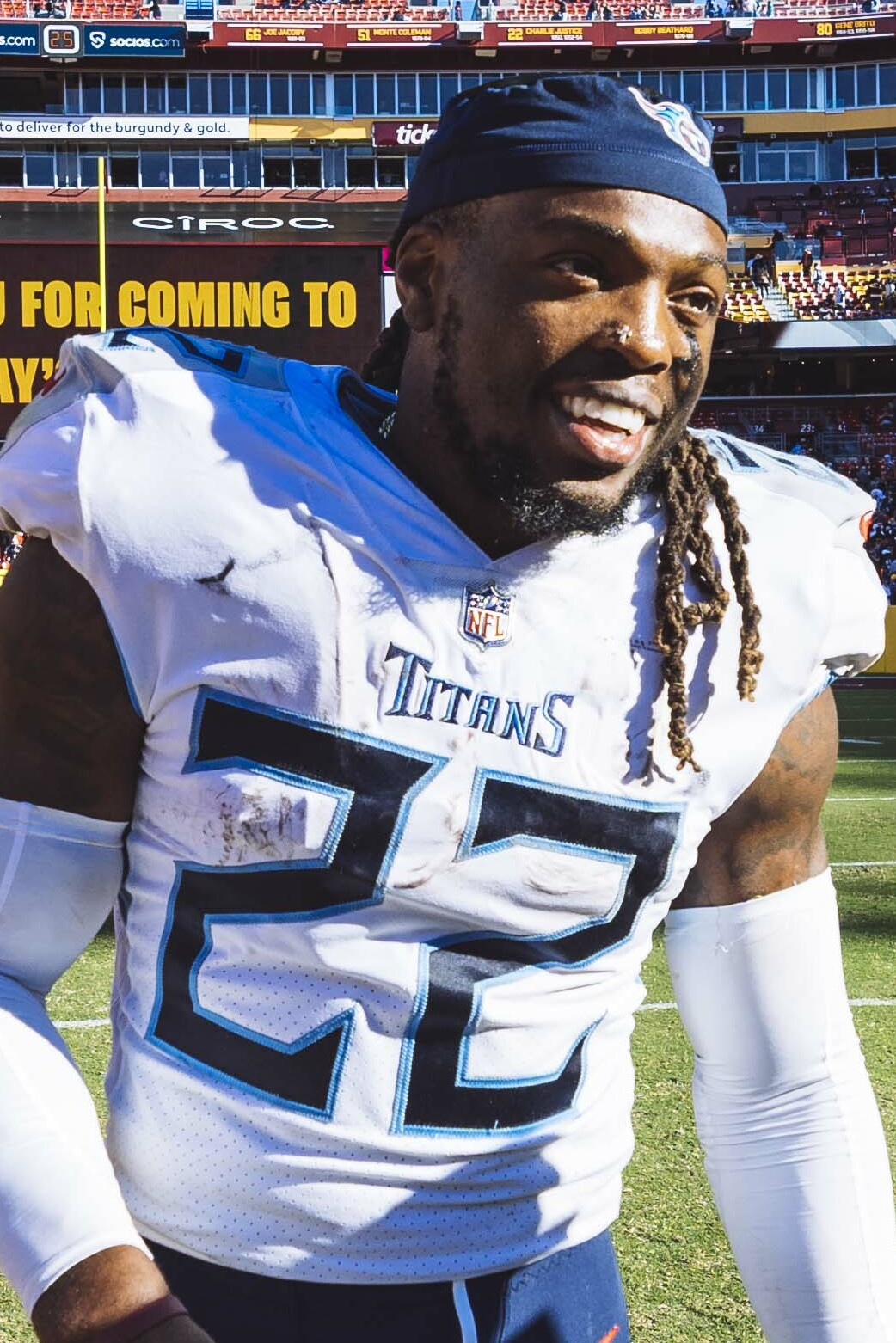
Derrick Henry was drafted 45th overall by the Tennessee Titans in the 2016 NFL draft.

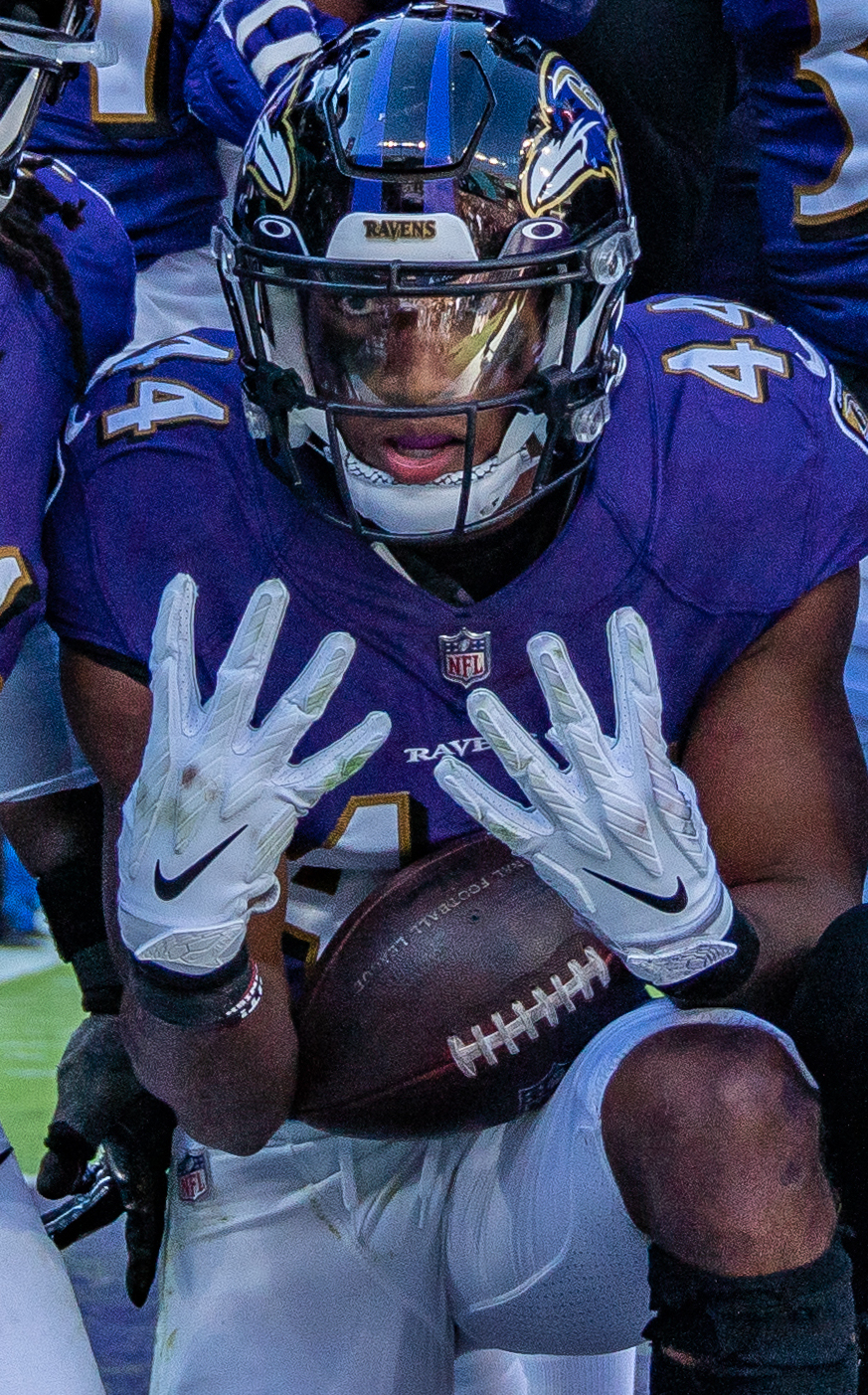
Marlon Humphrey was drafted 16th overall by the Baltimore Ravens in the 2017 NFL draft.

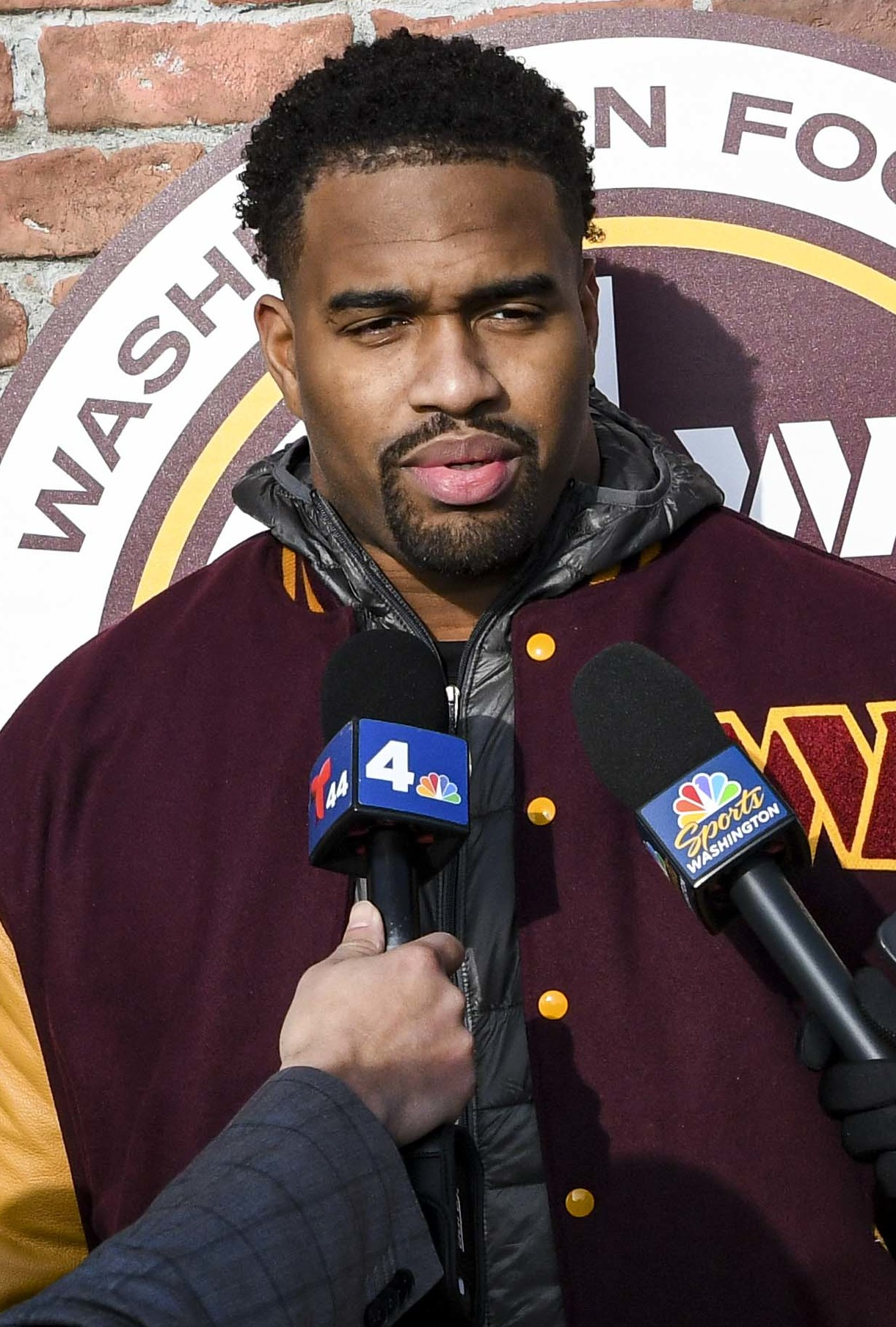
Jonathan Allen was drafted 17th overall by the Washington Redskins in the 2017 NFL draft.

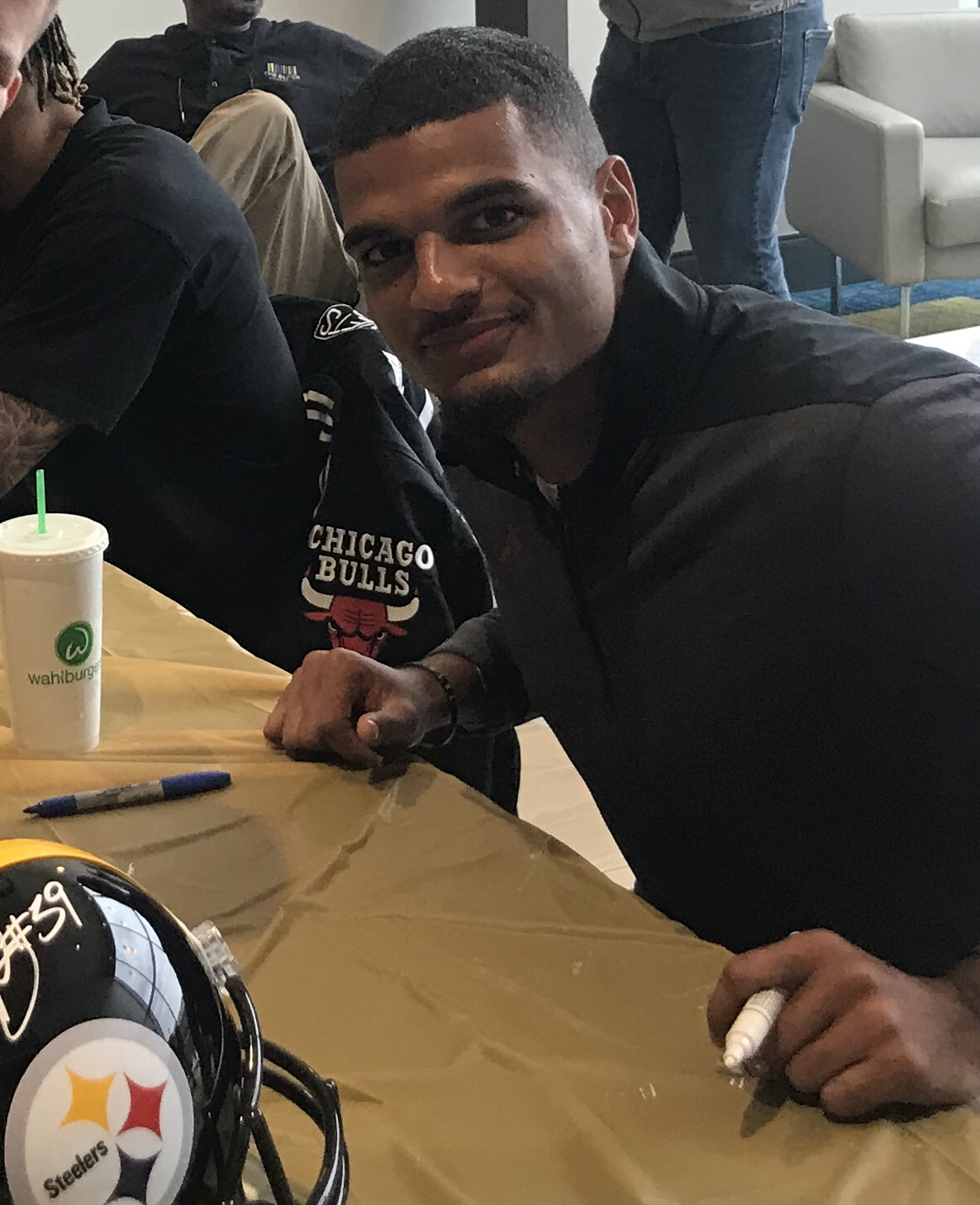
Minkah Fitzpatrick was drafted 11th overall by the Miami Dolphins in the 2018 NFL draft.

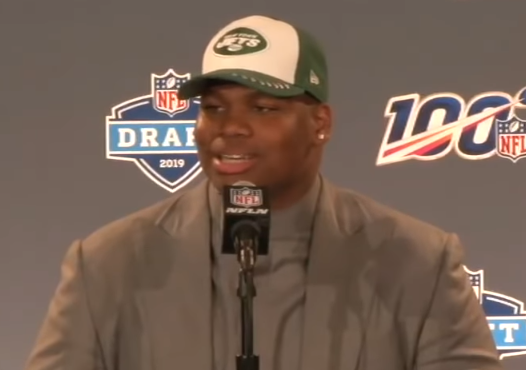
Quinnen Williams was drafted 3rd overall by the New York Jets in the 2019 NFL draft.

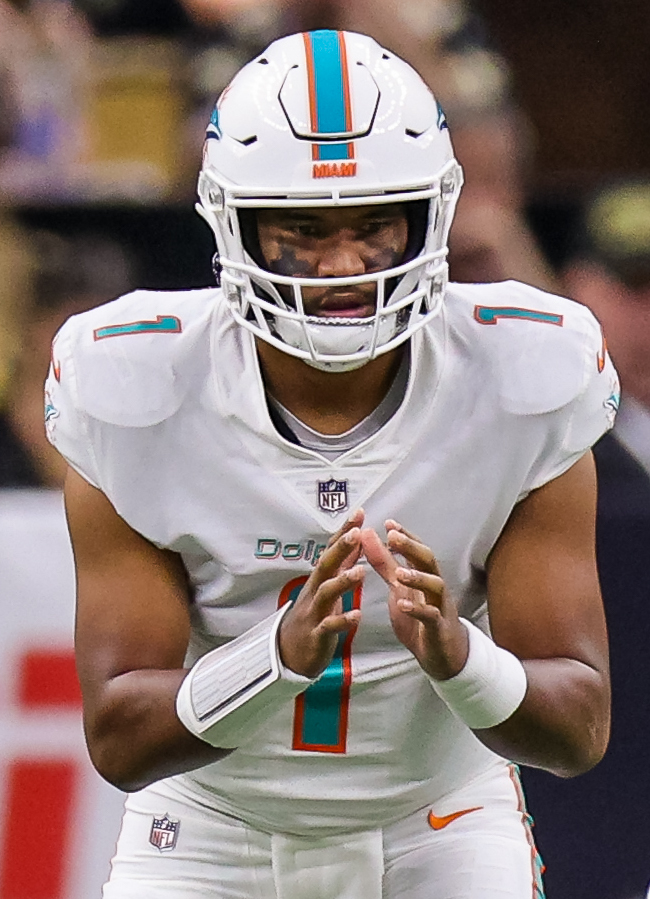
Tua Tagovailoa was drafted 5th overall by the Miami Dolphins in the 2020 NFL draft.

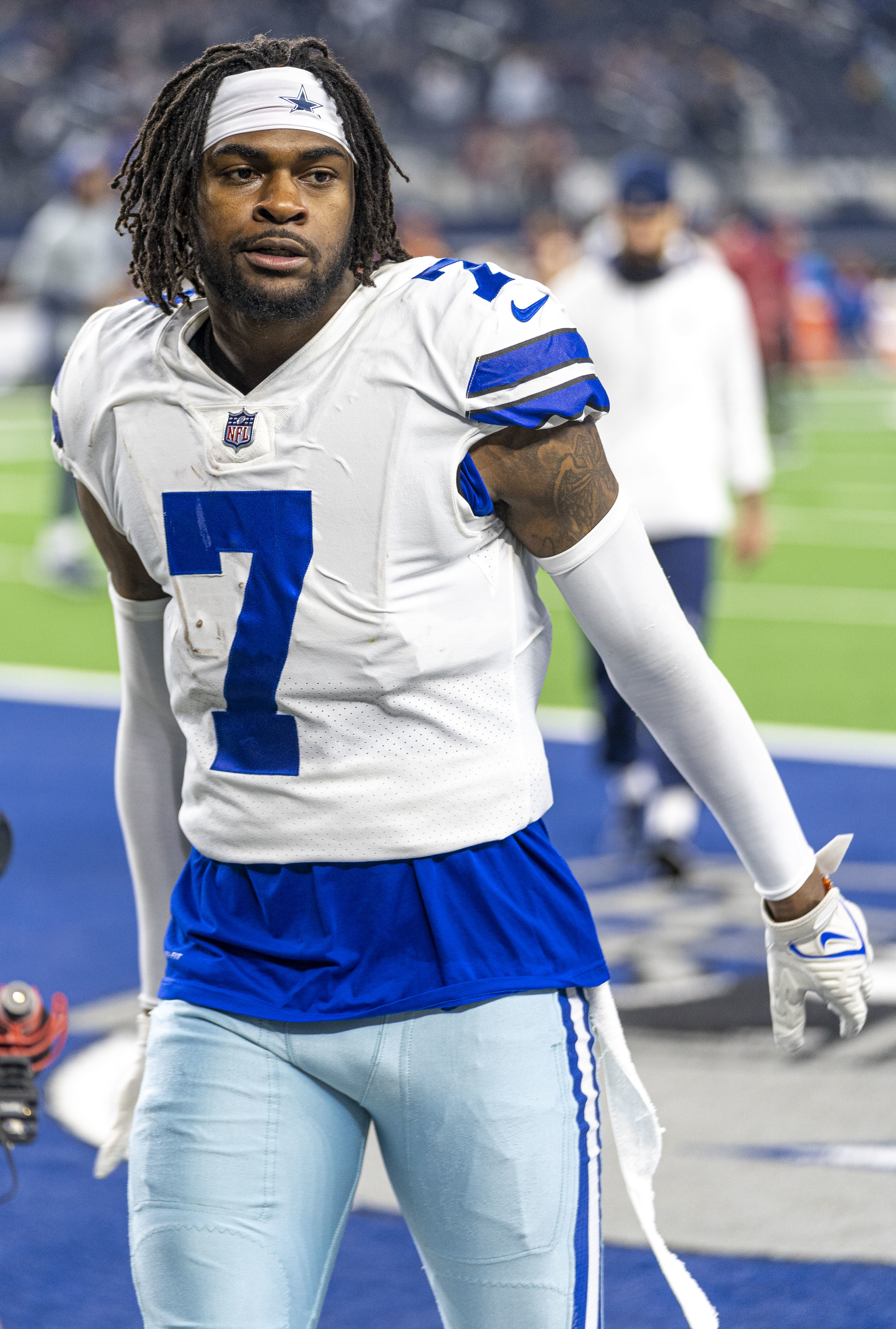
Trevon Diggs was drafted 51st overall by the Dallas Cowboys in the 2020 NFL draft.

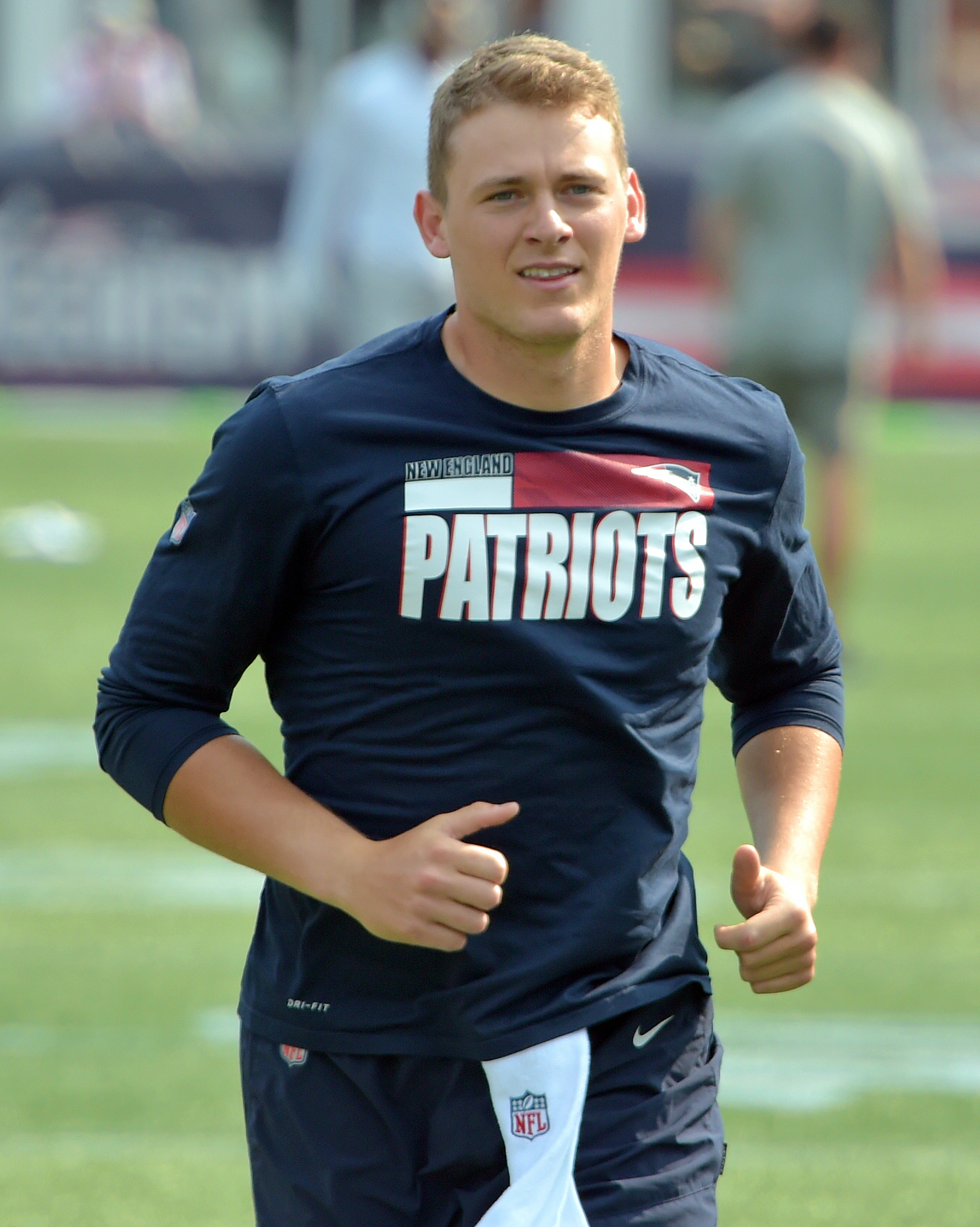
Mac Jones was drafted 15th overall by the New England Patriots in the 2021 NFL draft.

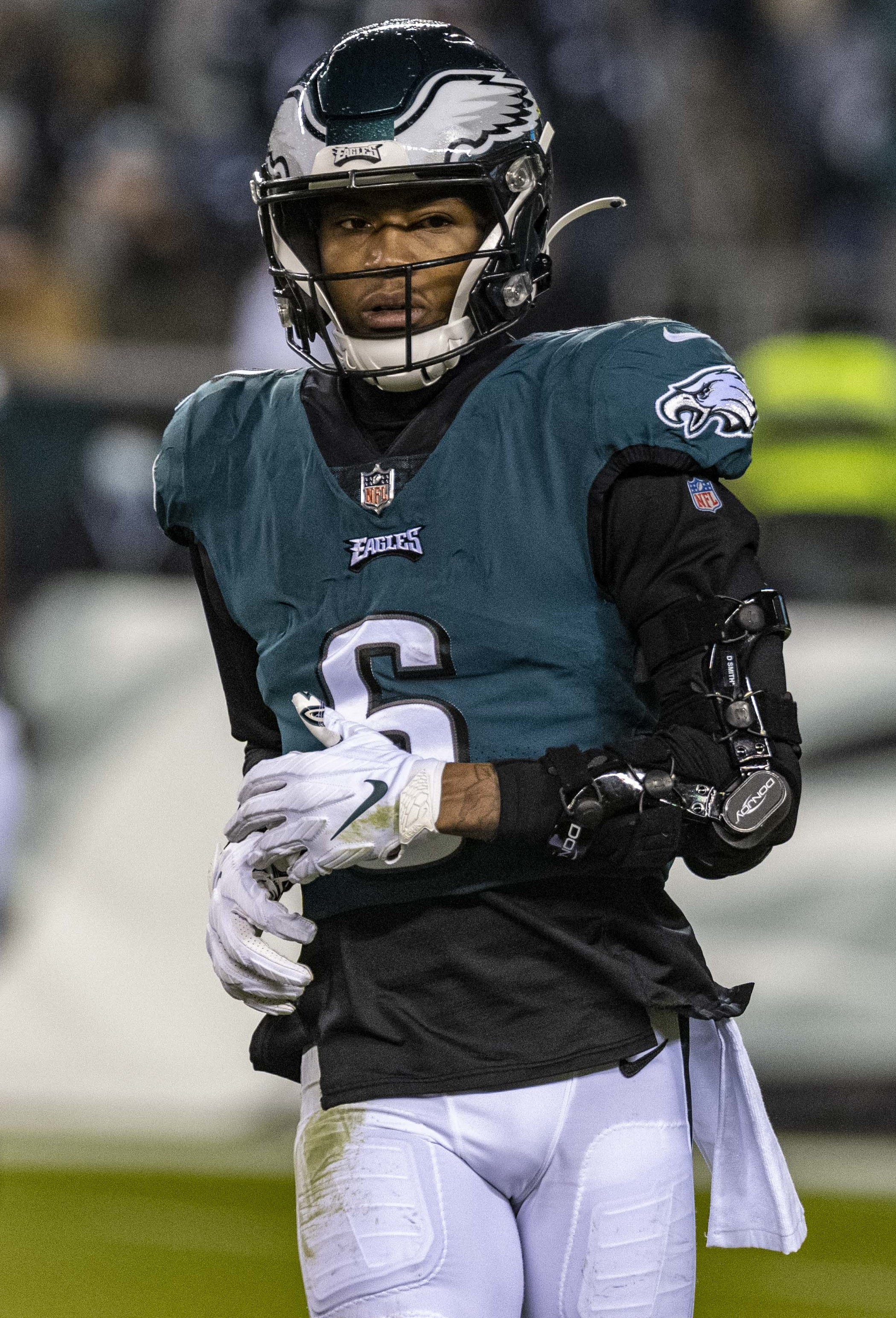
DeVonta Smith was drafted 10th overall by the Philadelphia Eagles in the 2021 NFL draft.

=== Key ===
^{†}	Won a league championship on Injury Reserve or Practice Squad (AFL championship, NFL championship, or Super Bowl) *Not counted as Super Bowl winning players.
^{*}	Selected to an All-Star Game (AFL All-Star game, NFL All-Star game or Pro Bowl)
^{‡}	Won a league championship (AFL championship, NFL championship, or Super Bowl)
^{§}	Won a Heisman Trophy, National Championship, and Super Bowl
^{◊}	Honored as leagues NFL Most Valuable Player or NFL Offensive Player of the Year/NFL Defensive Player of the Year
^{Δ}	Inducted into Pro Football Hall of Fame

=== National Football League ===
Year	Round	Pick	Overall	Player name	Position	NFL team	Notes
1936	1	2	2	Riley Smith‡	QB	Boston Redskins	NFL Champion (1937)
1936	4	4	31	Paul Bryant	End	Brooklyn Dodgers	—
1936	5	8	44	Kavanaugh Francis	C	Detroit Lions	—
1937	2	4	14	Arthur White‡*	OG/End	New York Giants	NFL Champion (1938); Pro Bowl (1942)
1938	2	3	13	Joe Kilgrow	HB	Brooklyn Dodgers	—
1938	7	3	53	Leroy Monsky	OG	Brooklyn Dodgers	—
1939	3	8	23	Charley Holm	FB	Washington Redskins	—
1939	9	3	73	Lew Bostick	OG	Cleveland Rams	—
1940	4	5	30	Bobby Wood	OT/DT	Cleveland Rams	—
1940	5	4	34	Walt Merrill	OT	Brooklyn Dodgers	—
1940	11	3	93	Cary Cox	C	Pittsburgh Steelers	—
1940	11	8	138	Hayward Sanford	End	Washington Redskins	—
1941	3	10	25	Fred Davis‡*	OT/DT	Washington Redskins	NFL Champion (1942, 1946); Pro Bowl (1942, 1950)
1941	7	8	58	Hal Newman	End	Brooklyn Dodgers	—
1941	10	10	90	Ed Hickerson	OG	Washington Redskins	—
1942	9	9	79	Noah Langdale	OT	Green Bay Packers	—
1942	14	3	123	John Wyhonic	OG	Philadelphia Eagles	—
1942	18	10	170	Holt Rast	End	Chicago Bears	—
1942	19	4	174	Jimmy Nelson	HB	Chicago Cardinals	—
1943	4	3	28	Joe Domnanovich	C/ILB	Brooklyn Dodgers	—
1943	5	3	33	George Hecht	OG	Chicago Cardinals	—
1943	8	10	70	Tony Leon	OG/ILB	Washington Redskins	—
1943	14	2	122	George Weeks	DE	Philadelphia Eagles	—
1943	14	5	125	Sam Sharpe	End	Cleveland Rams	—
1943	15	2	132	Russ Craft‡*	HB/FB/DB	Philadelphia Eagles	NFL Champion (1948, 1949); Pro Bowl (1951, 1952)
1943	25	6	236	Dave Brown	HB/FB	New York Giants	—
1943	29	4	274	Al Sabo	QB/HB	Brooklyn Dodgers	—
1944	9	2	78	Mitchell Olenski	OT	Brooklyn Tigers	—
1944	9	6	82	Don Whitmire	OT	Green Bay Packers	—
1944	13	6	126	Bill Baughman	C	Green Bay Packers	—
1944	22	2	221	Ted Cook	End/DB	Brooklyn Tigers	—
1944	27	6	279	Andy Bires	End	New York Giants	—
1944	27	8	281	Jack McKewan	OT	Chicago Bears	—
1945	8	5	70	Johnny August	HB	Cleveland Rams	—
1945	13	5	125	Jack Aland	OT	Cleveland Rams	—
1945	14	2	133	Hal Self	QB	Brooklyn Tigers	—
1945	17	6	170	Bobby Tom Jenkins	HB	Washington Redskins	—
1945	18	6	181	Jim McWhorter	QB	Detroit Lions	—
1945	22	1	220	Fred Grant	FB	Chicago Cardinals	—
1945	23	9	239	Norm Mosley	HB	Philadelphia Eagles	—
1945	25	6	258	Jack Green	OG	Chicago Bears	—
1945	30	5	312	Charley Compton	OT	Cleveland Rams	—
1945	31	4	322	Ken Reese	HB	Philadelphia Eagles	—
1945	32	5	329	John Staples	OG	New York Giants	—
1946	8	1	61	Phil Tinsley	End	Chicago Cardinals	—
1946	16	5	145	Nick Terizzi	OT	New York Giants	—
1946	26	10	250	D. J. Gambrell	C	Los Angeles Rams	—
1946	29	9	279	Fay Mills	OT	Washington Redskins	—
1947	24	1	216	Bill Capenhead	HB	Detroit Lions	—
1948	1	1	1	Harry Gilmer*	QB/HB/DB	Washington Redskins	Pro Bowl (1950, 1952)
1948	1	4	4	Lowell Tew	FB	Washington Redskins	—
1948	1	5	5	Vaughn Mancha	C/ILB	Boston Yanks	—
1948	5	9	34	John Wozniak*	OG/ILB	Pittsburgh Steelers	Pro Bowl (1952)
1948	10	9	84	Ray Richeson	OG	Philadelphia Eagles	—
1948	23	2	207	Roy Steiner	End	Detroit Lions	—
1949	7	9	70	Jim Cain‡	DE	Chicago Cardinals	NFL Champion (1953)
1949	10	5	96	Bob Hood	End	Pittsburgh Steelers	—
1949	13	3	114	Rebel Roy Steiner	End/DB	Green Bay Packers	—
1949	16	7	158	Dick Flowers	OT	Washington Redskins	—
1949	20	4	195	Pat O'Sullivan	C	New York Giants	—
1950	19	5	240	Ed White	End	Washington Redskins	—
1950	26	2	328	Red Noonan	HB	New York Yanks	—
1951	1	9	9	Butch Avinger	FB/P	Pittsburgh Steelers	—
1951	2	1	15	Eddie Salem	HB/FB	Washington Redskins	—
1951	6	11	73	Herb Hannah	OT	New York Giants	—
1951	8	8	94	Larry Lauer	C	New York Yanks	—
1951	12	8	143	Al Lary	End	New York Giants	—
1951	14	6	165	Mike Mizerany	OG	Pittsburgh Steelers	—
1951	22	2	257	Elliot Speed	C	Washington Redskins	—
1951	25	7	298	Tommy Calvin	HB/FB	Pittsburgh Steelers	—
1952	8	10	95	Billy Shipp	OT	New York Giants	—
1952	26	5	306	Bobby Wilson	HB/FB	Pittsburgh Steelers	—
1952	28	3	328	Harold Lutz	End	Chicago Cardinals	—
1953	1	8	8	Bobby Marlow	HB	New York Giants	—
1953	8	2	87	Jerry Watford	OG	Chicago Cardinals	—
1953	9	7	92	Jess Richardson‡*	DT	Philadelphia Eagles	NFL Champion (1960); Pro Bowl (1958)
1953	21	3	244	Joe Curtis	End	Chicago Cardinals	—
1953	22	6	247	Bob Conway	HB/FB	Green Bay Packers	—
1953	23	8	273	Travis Hunt	OT	San Francisco 49ers	—
1953	29	10	347	Clell Hobson	HB/FB	Cleveland Browns	—
1954	7	10	83	Sid Youngelman	DT/DE	San Francisco 49ers	—
1954	10	1	110	Tommy Lewis	FB	Chicago Cardinals	—
1954	12	1	134	Bill Oliver	HB/FB	Green Bay Packers	—
1954	25	2	291	John Smalley	OT	Green Bay Packers	—
1954	26	1	302	Ralph Carrigan	C	Chicago Cardinals	—
1955	5	5	54	George Mason	OT	Pittsburgh Steelers	—
1955	6	6	67	Tom "Corky" Tharp	HB/FB	Los Angeles Rams	—
1955	6	8	69	Bobby Luna	FS/P	San Francisco 49ers	—
1955	9	4	101	Ed Culpepper	DT	Green Bay Packers	—
1955	23	8	273	Cecil Ingram	DB/HB/QB	Philadelphia Eagles	—
1956	14	2	159	Jim Emmons	OT	Pittsburgh Steelers	—
1956	16	7	188	Curtis Lynch	End	Green Bay Packers	—
1956	17	7	200	Bart StarrΔ◊‡*	QB	Green Bay Packers	Pro Football Hall of Fame (1977); NFL Most Valuable Player (1966); NFL Champion (1961, 1962, 1965, 1966, 1967); Super Bowl Champion (I, II); Pro Bowl (1960, 1961, 1962, 1966)
1956	27	5	318	Al Ellett	OT	Philadelphia Eagles	—
1956	29	3	340	Wes Thompson	OT	Pittsburgh Steelers	—
1956	30	9	358	Jim Buckler	OG	Chicago Bears	—
1957	9	6	101	Don Comstock	HB/FB	Cleveland Browns	—
1957	12	7	140	Fred Sington	OT	San Francisco 49ers	—
1958	9	6	103	Jim Loftin	HB/FB	Detroit Lions	—
1958	30	8	357	Billy Lumpkin	End	New York Giants	—
1959	7	1	73	Bobby Jackson‡	QB/SS	Green Bay Packers	NFL Champion (1960)
1959	29	8	344	Ernie Moore	End	Los Angeles Rams	—
1959	30	10	358	Dave Sington	OT	New York Giants	—
1960	No selections						
1961	No selections						
1962	4	1	43	Billy Neighbors*	OG	Washington Redskins	Pro Bowl (1962)
1962	5	13	69	Bill Rice	End	St. Louis Cardinals	—
1962	16	1	211	Tommy Brooker	K/End	Washington Redskins	—
1962	16	9	219	Ray Abruzzese	RB/FS	Baltimore Colts	—
1963	1	6	6	Lee Roy Jordan‡*	ILB	Dallas Cowboys	Super Bowl Champion (VI); Pro Bowl (1967, 1968, 1969, 1973, 1974)
1963	2	10	24	Butch Wilson	TE/RB	Baltimore Colts	—
1963	3	5	33	Mike Fracchia	HB/FB	St. Louis Cardinals	—
1964	5	5	61	Benny Nelson	SS/HB	Detroit Lions	—
1964	5	13	69	Steve Wright‡	OT	Green Bay Packers	NFL Champion (1965); Super Bowl Champion (I, II)
1964	11	11	151	Eddie Versprille	RB	Cleveland Browns	—
1965	1	12	12	Joe NamathΔ◊‡*	QB	St. Louis Cardinals	Pro Football Hall of Fame (1985); AFL Most Valuable Player (1968); Super Bowl Champion (III); AFL All-Star Game (1965, 1967, 1968, 1969); Pro Bowl (1972)
1965	3	12	40	Ray Ogden	TE	St. Louis Cardinals	—
1965	9	8	120	Frank McClendon	OT	Minnesota Vikings	—
1965	10	5	131	Gaylon McCullough	C	Dallas Cowboys	—
1965	11	12	152	Bud French	HB/FB	St. Louis Cardinals	—
1966	7	15	110	Ray Perkins‡	WR	Baltimore Colts	Super Bowl Champion (V)
1966	11	1	156	Steve Sloan	QB	Atlanta Falcons	—
1966	15	1	216	Tommy Tolleson	WR	Atlanta Falcons	—
1966	15	11	226	Steve Bowman	RB	New York Giants	—
1966	16	13	243	David Ray	K	Cleveland Browns	—
1967	1	26	26	Leslie Kelley	RB/ILB	New Orleans Saints	—
1967	4	2	82	Louis Thompson	DT	New York Giants	—
1967	4	11	91	Wayne Trimble	WR/QB	San Francisco 49ers	—
1967	9	19	230	Cecil Dowdy	OT	Cleveland Browns	—
1968	1	20	20	Dennis Homan	WR	Dallas Cowboys	—
1968	2	25	52	Ken StablerΔ◊‡*	QB	Oakland Raiders	Pro Football Hall of Fame (2016); NFL Most Valuable Player (1974); AP NFL Offensive Player of the Year (1974); Super Bowl Champion (XI); Pro Bowl (1973, 1974, 1976, 1977)
1968	12	20	320	Bobby Johns	SS/FS	Kansas City Chiefs	—
1969	10	26	260	Mike Hall	ILB	New York Jets	—
1969	16	22	413	William Davis	OT	Oakland Raiders	—
1970	No selections						
1971	6	10	140	Scott Hunter	QB	Green Bay Packers	—
1972	3	10	62	Johnny Musso	RB	Chicago Bears	—
1972	11	6	266	David Bailey	WR	Green Bay Packers	—
1972	15	22	386	Robin Parkhouse	DE	Baltimore Colts	—
1972	16	21	411	Steve Higginbottom	FS/SS	Washington Redskins	—
1973	1	4	4	John HannahΔ*	OG	New England Patriots	Pro Football Hall of Fame (1991); Pro Bowl (1976, 1978, 1979, 1980, 1981, 1982, 1983, 1984, 1985)
1973	7	18	174	John Mitchell	DE	San Francisco 49ers	—
1973	12	23	309	Jim Krapf	C/OG	Oakland Raiders	—
1974	1	9	9	Wilbur Jackson‡	RB	San Francisco 49ers	Super Bowl Champion (XVII)
1974	3	2	54	Wayne Wheeler	WR	Chicago Bears	—
1974	6	8	138	Mike Raines	DT	San Francisco 49ers	—
1974	8	5	187	Greg Gantt	P	New York Jets	—
1974	16	2	392	Buddy Brown	OG	New York Giants	—
1975	3	1	53	Mike Washington	CB	Baltimore Colts	—
1975	8	13	195	Ricky Davis	CB/SS	Cincinnati Bengals	—
1976	1	6	6	Richard Todd	QB	New York Jets	—
1976	4	16	108	Wayne Rhodes	CB	Chicago Bears	—
1976	5	7	131	Woodrow Lowe	ILB	San Diego Chargers	—
1976	5	14	138	Willie Shelby	RB/KR	Cincinnati Bengals	—
1976	10	25	290	Leroy Cook	DE	Dallas Cowboys	—
1976	12	22	341	Joe Dale Harris	WR	Cincinnati Bengals	—
1977	2	12	40	Bob Baumhower*	NT/DT	Miami Dolphins	Pro Bowl (1979, 1981, 1982, 1983, 1984)
1977	3	1	57	Charley Hannah‡	OG/DE	Tampa Bay Buccaneers	Super Bowl Champion (XVIII)
1977	6	20	159	Paul Harris	DE/OLB	Pittsburgh Steelers	—
1977	8	17	212	Calvin Culliver	RB	Denver Broncos	—
1978	1	18	18	Bob Cryder	OG/OT	New England Patriots	—
1978	1	23	23	Ozzie NewsomeΔ*	TE	Cleveland Browns	Pro Football Hall of Fame (1999); Pro Bowl (1981, 1984, 1985)
1978	2	2	30	Johnny Davis‡	RB	Tampa Bay Buccaneers	Super Bowl Champion (XVI)
1978	11	6	284	Terry Jones	NT	Green Bay Packers	—
1979	1	6	6	Barry Krauss	ILB	Baltimore Colts	—
1979	1	14	14	Marty Lyons	DT/DE	New York Jets	—
1979	3	5	61	Tony Nathan	RB	Miami Dolphins	—
1979	7	19	184	Rich Wingo	ILB	Green Bay Packers	—
1979	9	26	246	Jeff Rutledge‡	QB	Los Angeles Rams	Super Bowl Champion (XXI, XXVI)
1980	1	21	21	Don McNeal	CB	Miami Dolphins	—
1980	2	20	48	Dwight StephensonΔ*	C	Miami Dolphins	Pro Football Hall of Fame (1998); Pro Bowl (1983, 1984, 1985, 1986, 1987)
1980	6	25	163	Wayne Hamilton	DE	San Diego Chargers	—
1980	7	4	169	Buddy Aydelette	OG/OT	Green Bay Packers	—
1980	8	7	200	Ken Harris	RB	New York Giants	—
1980	9	26	247	Steve Whitman	RB	San Diego Chargers	—
1981	1	5	5	E. J. Junior*	ILB/OLB	St. Louis Cardinals	Pro Bowl (1984, 1985)
1981	5	6	117	Byron Braggs	DE	Green Bay Packers	—
1981	7	14	180	Billy Jackson	RB	Kansas City Chiefs	—
1981	10	5	253	James Mallard	WR	St. Louis Cardinals	—
1981	12	9	313	Major Ogilvie	RB	San Francisco 49ers	—
1982	3	10	65	Benny Perrin	FS	St. Louis Cardinals	—
1982	8	15	210	Thomas Boyd	ILB	Green Bay Packers	—
1982	9	23	246	Warren Lyles	DT	San Diego Chargers	—
1983	1	16	16	Mike Pitts	DT/DE	Atlanta Falcons	—
1983	3	16	72	Jeremiah Castille	CB	Tampa Bay Buccaneers	—
1983	5	9	121	Steve Mott	C	Detroit Lions	—
1983	12	2	309	Robbie Jones‡	ILB	New York Giants	Super Bowl Champion (XXI)
1984	4	25	109	Joe Carter	RB	Miami Dolphins	—
1984	7	6	174	Jesse Bendross	WR	San Diego Chargers	—
1984	1 (Note: Joey Jones was selected as the ninth overall pick in the 1984 NFL supplemental draft of USFL and CFL players.)	9	9	Joey Jones	WR	Atlanta Falcons	—
1985	1	25	25	Emanuel King	OLB/DE	Cincinnati Bengals	—
1985	3	19	75	Ricky Moore	RB	San Francisco 49ers	—
1986	1	4	4	Jon Hand	DE	Indianapolis Colts	—
1986	2	12	39	Larry Roberts‡	DE	San Francisco 49ers	Super Bowl Champion (XXIII, XXIV)
1986	6	2	140	Thornton Chandler	TE	Dallas Cowboys	—
1986	6	25	163	Brent Sowell	DT	Miami Dolphins	—
1987	1	2	2	Cornelius Bennett*	OLB/ILB	Indianapolis Colts	Pro Bowl (1988, 1990, 1991, 1992, 1993)
1987	6	2	142	Freddie Robinson	FS	Indianapolis Colts	—
1987	6	16	156	Greg Richardson	WR	Minnesota Vikings	—
1987	7	1	169	Curt Jarvis	NT	Tampa Bay Buccaneers	—
1987	9	6	229	Wayne Davis	ILB	St. Louis Cardinals	—
1987	9	8	231	Wes Neighbors	C	Houston Oilers	—
1987	10	2	253	Chris Goode	CB	Indianapolis Colts	—
1987	12	6	313	Mike Shula	QB	Tampa Bay Buccaneers	—
1988	7	2	167	Kerry Goode	RB	Tampa Bay Buccaneers	—
1988	7	19	184	Bo Wright	RB	Buffalo Bills	—
1988	8	1	194	Phillip Brown	ILB/OLB	Atlanta Falcons	—
1989	1	4	4	Derrick ThomasΔ*	OLB	Kansas City Chiefs	Pro Football Hall of Fame (2009); Pro Bowl (1989, 1990, 1991, 1992, 1993, 1994, 1995, 1996, 1997)
1989	5	24	136	Greg Gilbert	ILB	Chicago Bears	—
1989	6	7	146	Chris Mohr	P	Tampa Bay Buccaneers	—
1989	6	19	158	Howard Cross‡	TE	New York Giants	Super Bowl Champion (XXV)
1989	7	21	188	George Bethune	ILB/DE	Los Angeles Rams	—
1989	1 (Note: Bobby Humphrey was selected as a first round pick in the 1989 NFL supplemental draft.)	N/A	N/A	Bobby Humphrey*	RB	Denver Broncos	Pro Bowl (1990)
1990	1	4	4	Keith McCants	DE	Tampa Bay Buccaneers	—
1990	6	7	144	John Mangum	CB	Chicago Bears	—
1990	10	22	270	Thomas Rayam	OG	Washington Redskins	—
1991	2	9	36	George Thornton	DT/DE	San Diego Chargers	—
1991	10	26	276	Byron Holdbrooks	DT	San Francisco 49ers	—
1991	11	18	296	Efrum Thomas	CB	Pittsburgh Steelers	—
1992	2	20	48	Siran Stacy	RB	Philadelphia Eagles	—
1992	3	15	71	Kevin Turner	FB/RB	New England Patriots	—
1992	8	22	218	Robert Stewart	DT	New Orleans Saints	—
1992	10	20	272	Mark McMillian	CB	New Orleans Saints	—
1993	1	5	5	John Copeland	DE	Cincinnati Bengals	—
1993	1	6	6	Eric Curry	DE	Tampa Bay Buccaneers	—
1993	1	29	29	George Teague	CB/FS	Green Bay Packers	—
1993	3	6	62	Antonio London	ILB	Detroit Lions	—
1993	4	10	94	Derrick Lassic‡	RB	Dallas Cowboys	Super Bowl Champion (XXVIII)
1993	6	23	163	Derrick Oden	ILB	Philadelphia Eagles	—
1994	1	9	9	Antonio Langham	CB	Cleveland Browns	—
1994	2	6	35	Kevin Lee	WR	New England Patriots	—
1994	2	11	40	David Palmer	WR/KR/PR	Minnesota Vikings	—
1994	2	31	60	Jeremy Nunley	DE	Houston Oilers	—
1994	5	28	159	Roosevelt Patterson	OG	Los Angeles Raiders	—
1994	7	26	220	Lemanski Hall	OLB/ILB	Houston Oilers	—
1995	2	14	46	Sherman Williams‡	RB	Dallas Cowboys	Super Bowl Champion (XXX)
1995	4	4	102	Sam Shade	CB/SS	Cincinnati Bengals	—
1995	4	10	108	Dameian Jeffries	DE	New Orleans Saints	—
1995	5	26	160	Jay Barker	QB	Green Bay Packers	—
1995	7	17	225	Bryne Diehl	P	New York Giants	—
1996	3	23	84	Shannon Brown	DT	Atlanta Falcons	—
1996	4	12	107	Kendrick Burton	DE	Houston Oilers	—
1996	4	34	129	Brad Ford	CB	Detroit Lions	—
1996	6	30	197	Tony Johnson	TE	Philadelphia Eagles	—
1996	6	37	204	Toderick Malone	WR	New Orleans Saints	—
1997	1	20	20	Dwayne Rudd	ILB	Minnesota Vikings	—
1997	5	7	137	Patrick Hape	TE	Tampa Bay Buccaneers	—
1997	7	35	236	Ralph Staten	ILB/DB	Baltimore Ravens	—
1998	2	24	54	Rod Rutledge‡	TE	New England Patriots	Super Bowl Champion (XXXVI)
1998	4	8	100	Michael Myers	DT	Dallas Cowboys	—
1998	4	25	117	Deshea Townsend‡	CB	Pittsburgh Steelers	Super Bowl Champion (XL, XLIII)
1998	4	30	122	Curtis Alexander	RB	Denver Broncos	—
1999	1	26	26	Fernando Bryant‡	CB	Jacksonville Jaguars	Super Bowl Champion (XLIII)
2000	1	3	3	Chris Samuels*	OT	Washington Redskins	Pro Bowl (2001, 2002, 2005, 2006, 2007, 2008)
2000	1	19	19	Shaun Alexander◊*	RB	Seattle Seahawks	NFL Most Valuable Player (2005); AP NFL Offensive Player of the Year (2005); Pro Bowl (2003, 2004, 2005)
2000	2	11	42	Cornelius Griffin	DT	New York Giants	—
2001	2	25	56	Tony Dixon	FS/SS	Dallas Cowboys	—
2001	3	19	81	Kenny Smith	DT	New Orleans Saints	—
2001	5	25	156	Shawn Draper	TE/OG	Miami Dolphins	—
2002	3	4	69	Saleem Rasheed	ILB	San Francisco 49ers	—
2002	5	14	149	Jason McAddley	WR	Arizona Cardinals	—
2002	5	20	155	Terry Jones	TE	Baltimore Ravens	—
2002	5	27	162	Freddie Milons	WR	Philadelphia Eagles	—
2003	4	12	109	Jarret Johnson	DE/OLB	Baltimore Ravens	—
2003	5	6	141	Kenny King	DE	Arizona Cardinals	—
2003	5	10	145	Kindal Moorehead	DT	Carolina Panthers	—
2003	6	29	202	Waine Bacon	SS	Atlanta Falcons	—
2003	7	21	235	Ahmaad Galloway	RB	Denver Broncos	—
2004	2	14	46	Justin Smiley	OG	San Francisco 49ers	—
2004	2	25	57	Antwan Odom	DE	Tennessee Titans	—
2004	6	6	171	Triandos Luke	WR	Denver Broncos	—
2004	7	21	222	Derrick Pope	ILB	Miami Dolphins	—
2005	3	15	79	Evan Mathis‡*	OG	Carolina Panthers	Super Bowl Champion (50); Pro Bowl (2013, 2014)
2005	5	28	164	Wesley Britt	OT	San Diego Chargers	—
2005	6	4	178	Anthony Bryant	NT/DT	Tampa Bay Buccaneers	—
2005	7	21	235	Cornelius Wortham	ILB	Seattle Seahawks	—
2006	2	1	33	DeMeco Ryans*	ILB	Houston Texans	Pro Bowl (2007, 2009)
2006	2	11	43	Roman Harper‡*	FS/SS	New Orleans Saints	Super Bowl Champion (XLIV); Pro Bowl (2009, 2010)
2006	3	21	85	Brodie Croyle	QB	Kansas City Chiefs	—
2006	5	25	158	Charlie Peprah‡	FS	New York Giants	Super Bowl Champion (XLV)
2006	5	26	159	Mark Anderson	DE	Chicago Bears	—
2007	4	38	137	Le'Ron McClain*	FB	Baltimore Ravens	Pro Bowl (2008, 2009)
2007	7	36	246	Kenneth Darby	RB	Tampa Bay Buccaneers	—
2007	7	45	255	Ramzee Robinson	CB	Detroit Lions	—
2008	No selections						
2009	1	6	6	Andre Smith	OT	Cincinnati Bengals	—
2009	3	10	74	Glen Coffee	RB	San Francisco 49ers	—
2009	3	13	77	Antoine Caldwell	C	Houston Texans	—
2009	3	31	95	Rashad Johnson	FS	Arizona Cardinals	—
2010	1	8	8	Rolando McClain	ILB	Oakland Raiders	—
2010	1	20	20	Kareem Jackson	CB	Houston Texans	—
2010	2	18	50	Javier Arenas	CB/KR/PR	Kansas City Chiefs	—
2010	2	25	57	Terrence Cody‡	NT	Baltimore Ravens	Super Bowl Champion (XLVII)
2010	3	34	98	Mike Johnson	OG	Atlanta Falcons	—
2010	7	4	211	Marquis Johnson	CB	St. Louis Rams	—
2010	7	40	247	Brandon Deaderick	DE	New England Patriots	—
2011	1	3	3	Marcell Dareus*	DT	Buffalo Bills	Pro Bowl (2013, 2014)
2011	1	6	6	Julio Jones*	WR	Atlanta Falcons	Pro Bowl (2012, 2014, 2015, 2016, 2017, 2018, 2019)
2011	1	25	25	James Carpenter‡	OG	Seattle Seahawks	Super Bowl Champion (XLVIII)
2011	1	28	28	Mark Ingram II*	RB	New Orleans Saints	Pro Bowl (2014, 2017, 2019)
2011	7	5	208	Greg McElroy	QB	New York Jets	—
2012	1	3	3	Trent Richardson	RB	Cleveland Browns	—
2012	1	7	7	Mark Barron	FS/SS	Tampa Bay Buccaneers	—
2012	1	17	17	Dre Kirkpatrick	CB	Cincinnati Bengals	—
2012	1	25	25	Dont'a Hightower‡*	ILB	New England Patriots	Super Bowl Champion (XLIX, LI); Pro Bowl (2016, 2019)
2012	2	3	35	Courtney Upshaw‡	OLB	Baltimore Ravens	Super Bowl Champion (XLVII)
2012	5	1	136	Josh Chapman	DT	Indianapolis Colts	—
2012	5	11	146	DeQuan Menzie	CB	Kansas City Chiefs	—
2012	7	40	247	Brad Smelley	TE	Cleveland Browns	—
2013	1	9	9	Dee Milliner	CB	New York Jets	—
2013	1	10	10	Chance Warmack‡	OG	Tennessee Titans	Super Bowl Champion (LII)
2013	1	11	11	D. J. Fluker	OT	San Diego Chargers	—
2013	2	29	61	Eddie Lacy*	RB	Green Bay Packers	Pro Bowl (2013)
2013	4	2	99	Nico Johnson	ILB	Kansas City Chiefs	—
2013	4	16	113	Barrett Jones	C/OT/OG	St. Louis Rams	—
2013	5	4	137	Jesse Williams†	DT/NT	Seattle Seahawks	Injury Reserve - Super Bowl Champion (XLVIII)
2013	5	24	157	Quinton Dial	DE	San Francisco 49ers	—
2013	7	5	211	Michael Williams†	TE	Detroit Lions	Injury Reserve - Super Bowl Champion (LI)
2014	1	17	17	C. J. Mosley*	ILB	Baltimore Ravens	Pro Bowl (2014, 2016, 2017, 2018, 2022)
2014	1	21	21	Ha Ha Clinton-Dix*	SS/FS	Green Bay Packers	Pro Bowl (2016)
2014	2	12	44	Cyrus Kouandjio	OT	Buffalo Bills	—
2014	4	23	123	Kevin Norwood	WR	Seattle Seahawks	—
2014	5	20	160	Ed Stinson	DE	Arizona Cardinals	—
2014	5	24	164	A. J. McCarron	QB	Cincinnati Bengals	—
2014	5	27	167	Vinnie Sunseri	FS	New Orleans Saints	—
2014	6	1	177	Jeoffrey Pagan	DE	Houston Texans	—
2015	1	4	4	Amari Cooper*	WR	Oakland Raiders	Pro Bowl (2015, 2016, 2018, 2019, 2023)
2015	2	1	33	Landon Collins*	SS	New York Giants	Pro Bowl (2016, 2017, 2018)
2015	2	4	36	T. J. Yeldon	RB	Jacksonville Jaguars	—
2015	4	9	108	Jalston Fowler	FB	Tennessee Titans	—
2015	4	13	112	Arie Kouandjio	OG	Washington Redskins	—
2015	7	11	228	Austin Shepherd	OT	Minnesota Vikings	—
2015	7	36	253	Xzavier Dickson	OLB/ILB	New England Patriots	—
2016	1	18	18	Ryan Kelly*	C	Indianapolis Colts	Pro Bowl (2019, 2020, 2021, 2023)
2016	2	10	41	Reggie Ragland‡	ILB	Buffalo Bills	Super Bowl Champion (LIV)
2016	2	14	45	Derrick Henry◊*	RB	Tennessee Titans	AP NFL Offensive Player of the Year (2020); Pro Bowl (2019, 2020, 2022, 2023, 2024)
2016	2	15	46	A'Shawn Robinson‡	DT/NT	Detroit Lions	Super Bowl Champion (LVI)
2016	2	18	49	Jarran Reed‡	DT	Seattle Seahawks	Super Bowl Champion (LX)
2016	2	29	60	Cyrus Jones‡	CB/PR	New England Patriots	Super Bowl Champion (LI)
2016	3	10	73	Kenyan Drake	RB	Miami Dolphins	—
2017	1	16	16	Marlon Humphrey*	CB	Baltimore Ravens	Pro Bowl (2019, 2020, 2022, 2024)
2017	1	17	17	Jonathan Allen*	DE	Washington Redskins	Pro Bowl (2021, 2022)
2017	1	19	19	O. J. Howard‡	TE	Tampa Bay Buccaneers	Super Bowl Champion (LV)
2017	1	31	31	Reuben Foster	ILB	San Francisco 49ers	—
2017	2	2	34	Cam Robinson	OT	Jacksonville Jaguars	—
2017	2	17	49	Ryan Anderson	OLB	Washington Redskins	—
2017	2	23	55	Dalvin Tomlinson	DT/NT	New York Giants	—
2017	3	14	78	Tim Williams	OLB	Baltimore Ravens	—
2017	3	15	79	ArDarius Stewart	WR	New York Jets	—
2017	4	5	112	Eddie Jackson*	SS/FS/CB	Chicago Bears	Pro Bowl (2018, 2019)
2018	1	11	11	Minkah Fitzpatrick*	SS/CB	Miami Dolphins	Pro Bowl (2019, 2020, 2022, 2023, 2024)
2018	1	13	13	Daron Payne*	NT/DT	Washington Redskins	Pro Bowl (2022)
2018	1	22	22	Rashaan Evans	ILB/OLB	Tennessee Titans	—
2018	1	26	26	Calvin Ridley	WR	Atlanta Falcons	—
2018	3	29	93	Ronnie Harrison	FS	Jacksonville Jaguars	—
2018	4	14	114	Da'Shawn Hand	DE	Detroit Lions	—
2018	4	18	118	Anthony Averett	CB	Baltimore Ravens	—
2018	5	35	172	J. K. Scott	P	Green Bay Packers	—
2018	6	23	197	Shaun Dion Hamilton	ILB	Washington Redskins	—
2018	6	41	215	Bradley Bozeman	C	Baltimore Ravens	—
2018	7	18	236	Bo Scarbrough	RB	Dallas Cowboys	—
2018	7	28	246	Joshua Frazier	DT	Pittsburgh Steelers	—
2019	1	3	3	Quinnen Williams*	DT	New York Jets	Pro Bowl (2022, 2023, 2024, 2025)
2019	1	11	11	Jonah Williams	OT	Cincinnati Bengals	—
2019	1	24	24	Josh Jacobs*	RB	Oakland Raiders	Pro Bowl (2020, 2022, 2024)
2019	2	18	50	Irv Smith Jr.	TE	Minnesota Vikings	—
2019	3	24	87	Damien Harris	RB	New England Patriots	—
2019	4	13	115	Christian Miller	OLB	Carolina Panthers	—
2019	5	1	139	Deionte Thompson	SS	Arizona Cardinals	—
2019	5	15	153	Ross Pierschbacher	OG	Washington Redskins	—
2019	5	17	155	Mack Wilson	ILB/OLB	Cleveland Browns	—
2019	6	20	192	Isaiah Buggs†	DT	Pittsburgh Steelers	Practice Squad - Super Bowl Champion (LVIII)
2020
2020	1	5	5	Tua Tagovailoa*	QB	Miami Dolphins	Pro Bowl (2023)
2020	1	10	10	Jedrick Wills	OT	Cleveland Browns	—
2020	1	12	12	Henry Ruggs	WR	Las Vegas Raiders	—
2020	1	15	15	Jerry Jeudy*	WR	Denver Broncos	Pro Bowl (2024)
2020	2	4	36	Xavier McKinney*	FS	New York Giants	Pro Bowl (2024)
2020	2	19	51	Trevon Diggs*	CB	Dallas Cowboys	Pro Bowl (2021, 2022)
2020	2	24	56	Raekwon Davis	DT	Miami Dolphins	—
2020	3	20	84	Terrell Lewis‡	OLB	Los Angeles Rams	Super Bowl Champion (LVI)
2020	3	23	87	Anfernee Jennings	ILB/OLB	New England Patriots	—
2021	1	6	6	Jaylen Waddle	WR/KR/PR	Miami Dolphins	—
2021	1	9	9	Patrick Surtain II◊*	CB	Denver Broncos	AP NFL Defensive Player of the Year (2024); Pro Bowl (2022, 2023, 2024, 2025)
2021	1	10	10	DeVonta Smith‡§	WR	Philadelphia Eagles	Super Bowl Champion (LIX)
2021	1	15	15	Mac Jones*	QB	New England Patriots	Pro Bowl (2021)
2021	1	17	17	Alex Leatherwood	OT	Las Vegas Raiders	—
2021	1	24	24	Najee Harris*	RB	Pittsburgh Steelers	Pro Bowl (2021)
2021	2	5	37	Landon Dickerson‡*	C	Philadelphia Eagles	Super Bowl Champion (LIX); Pro Bowl (2022, 2023, 2024)
2021	2	6	38	Christian Barmore	DT	New England Patriots	—
2021	6	9	193	Deonte Brown	OG	Carolina Panthers	—
2021	6	38	222	Thomas Fletcher	LS	Carolina Panthers	—
2022	1	7	7	Evan Neal	OT	New York Giants	—
2022	1	12	12	Jameson Williams	WR	Detroit Lions	—
2022	2	12	44	John Metchie III	WR	Houston Texans	—
2022	2	15	47	Phidarian Mathis	DT	Washington Commanders	—
2022	3	11	75	Christian Harris	ILB	Houston Texans	—
2022	3	34	98	Brian Robinson Jr.	RB	Washington Commanders	—
2022	4	14	119	Jalyn Armour-Davis	CB	Baltimore Ravens	—
2023	1	1	1	Bryce Young	QB	Carolina Panthers	—
2023	1	3	3	Will Anderson Jr.*	DE/OLB	Houston Texans	Pro Bowl (2023, 2025)
2023	1	12	12	Jahmyr Gibbs*	RB	Detroit Lions	Pro Bowl (2023, 2024, 2025)
2023	2	14	45	Brian Branch*	FS/SS	Detroit Lions	Pro Bowl (2024)
2023	3	2	65	Tyler Steen‡	OT	Philadelphia Eagles	Super Bowl Champion (LIX)
2023	3	7	70	Byron Young†	DT	Las Vegas Raiders	Injury Reserve - Super Bowl Champion (LIX)
2023	3	32	95	Jordan Battle	SS	Cincinnati Bengals	__
2023	3	38	101	Cameron Latu	TE	San Francisco 49ers	__
2023	5	32	167	Henry To'oTo'o	ILB	Houston Texans	__
2023	7	7	224	DeMarcco Hellams	FS	Atlanta Falcons	__
2024	1	7	7	JC Latham	OT	Tennessee Titans	—
2024	1	17	17	Dallas Turner	OLB	Minnesota Vikings	—
2024	1	24	24	Terrion Arnold	CB	Detroit Lions	—
2024	2	9	41	Kool-Aid McKinstry	CB	New Orleans Saints	__
2024	2	25	57	Chris Braswell	DE	Tampa Bay Buccaneers	__
2024	3	16	80	Jermaine Burton	WR	Cincinnati Bengals	__
2024	4	5	105	Justin Eboigbe	DT	Los Angeles Chargers	__
2024	6	10	186	Jase McClellan	RB	Atlanta Falcons	__
2024	6	27	203	Will Reichard	K	Minnesota Vikings	__
2024	7	37	257	Jaylen Key	FS	New York Jets	—
2025	1	12	12	Tyler Booker	OG	Dallas Cowboys	—
2025	1	31	31	Jihaad Campbell	ILB	Philadelphia Eagles	—
2025	3	2	65	Jalen Milroe‡	QB	Seattle Seahawks	Super Bowl Champion (LX)
2025	4	28	130	Malachi Moore	FS/SS	New York Jets	—
2025	4	32	134	Que Robinson	OLB	Denver Broncos	—
2025	5	39	175	Robbie Ouzts‡	TE	Seattle Seahawks	Super Bowl Champion (LX)
2025	6	14	190	Tim Smith	DT	Indianapolis Colts	—
2026	1	12	12	Kadyn Proctor	OT	Miami Dolphins	—
2026	1	13	13	Ty Simpson	QB	Los Angeles Rams	—
2026	2	15	47	Germie Bernard	WR	Pittsburgh Steelers	—
2026	4	37	137	LT Overton	DT	Dallas Cowboys	—
2026	5	6	146	Parker Brailsford	C	Cleveland Browns	—
2026	5	9	149	Justin Jefferson	ILB	Cleveland Browns	—
2026	5	33	173	Josh Cuevas	TE	Baltimore Ravens	—
2026	6	20	201	Domani Jackson	CB	Green Bay Packers	—
2026	7	16	232	Tim Keenan III	DT	Los Angeles Rams	—
2026	7	29	245	Jam Miller	RB	New England Patriots	—

=== American Football League ===
List of players drafted into the AFL
Year	Round	Overall	Player name	Position	AFL team	Notes
1960	1		Chuck Allen	OT	New York Titans	—
1960	2		Don Cochran	OT	Houston Oilers	—
1961	No selections					
1962	5	39	Bill Rice	End	Houston Oilers	—
1962	6	46	Billy Neighbors*	OG	Boston Patriots	AFL All-Star Game (1963)
1962	17	131	Tommy Brooker‡*	K/End	Dallas Texans	AFL championship (1962, 1966); AFL All-Star Game (1964)
1962	23	180	Ray Abruzzese‡	CB/SS/FS	Buffalo Bills	AFL championship (1964)
1962	24	187	Pat Trammell	QB	Dallas Texans	—
1963	2	14	Lee Roy Jordan‡*	ILB	Boston Patriots	Super Bowl Champion (VI); Pro Bowl (1967, 1968, 1969, 1973, 1974)
1963	6	41	Butch Wilson	TE	Oakland Raiders	—
1963	7	55	Richard Williamson	End	Boston Patriots	—
1964	8	59	Steve Wright	OT	New York Jets	—
1964	12	94	Benny Nelson	SS/HB	Houston Oilers	—
1965	1	1	Joe NamathΔ◊‡*	QB	New York Jets	Pro Football Hall of Fame (1985); AFL Most Valuable Player (1968); Super Bowl Champion (III); AFL All-Star Game (1965, 1967, 1968, 1969); Pro Bowl (1972)
1965	8	58	Ray Ogden	TE	Houston Oilers	—
1965	19	147	Frank McClendon	OT	Oakland Raiders	—
1966	17	150	Tommy Tolleson	WR	New York Jets	—
1966	20	179	Steve Bowman	RB	Oakland Raiders	—

== Notable undrafted players/Players before the official NFL draft ==
Note: No drafts held before 1936

Debut year	Player name	Position	Debut NFL/AFL team	Notes
1935	Don HutsonΔ◊‡*	End/FS/K	Green Bay Packers	Pro Football Hall of Fame (1963); NFL Most Valuable Player (1941, 1942); NFL Champion (1936, 1939, 1944); NFL All-Star (1939, 1940, 1941, 1942)
1937	Bill Young‡*	OT	Washington Redskins	NFL Champion (1937, 1942); Pro Bowl (1941)
1939	Bill Lee‡*	OT	Green Bay Packers	NFL Champion (1939); Pro Bowl (1939)
1946	Don Avery	OT	Washington Redskins	—
1954	Ken MacAfee	TE	New York Giants	—
1966	Paul Crane‡	C/ILB	New York Jets	Super Bowl Champion (III)
1975	Sylvester Croom	C	New Orleans Saints	—
1980	Curtis McGriff‡	DT	New York Giants	Super Bowl Champion (XXI)
1981	Randy Scott	ILB	Green Bay Packers	—
1984	Randy Edwards	DE	Seattle Seahawks	—
1985	Preston Gothard	TE	Pittsburgh Steelers	—
1985	Willard Scissum	OT	Denver Broncos	—
1985	Bill Searcey	OG	San Diego Chargers	—
1985	Paul Tripoli	CB/FS	Cleveland Browns	—
1986	Paul Ott Carruth	RB	Green Bay Packers	—
1987	Albert Bell	WR	Cleveland Browns	—
1987	Jackie Cline	DT	Pittsburgh Steelers	—
1987	Hoss Johnson	OT	Tampa Bay Buccaneers	—
1987	Mike Rodriguez	NT	Los Angeles Raiders	—
1987	Ricky Thomas	SS	Seattle Seahawks	—
1987	Van Tiffin	K	Tampa Bay Buccaneers	—
1990	Willie Wyatt	NT	Tampa Bay Buccaneers	—
1992	John Sullins	ILB	Denver Broncos	—
1995	Tommy Johnson	CB	Jacksonville Jaguars	—
1995	Andre Royal	ILB	Carolina Panthers	—
1999	Daniel Pope	P	Detroit Lions	—
2000	Reggie Grimes	DT	New England Patriots	—
2002	Victor Ellis	ILB/OLB	Jacksonville Jaguars	—
2002	Reggie Myles	CB	Cincinnati Bengals	—
2003	Alonzo Ephraim	C	Philadelphia Eagles	—
2004	Atlas Herrion	OG	Green Bay Packers	—
2004	Marico Portis	OG	Tennessee Titans	—
2004	Shaud Williams	RB	Buffalo Bills	—
2005	Dante Ellington	OT	Arizona Cardinals	—
2006	Anthony Madison‡	CB	Pittsburgh Steelers	Super Bowl Champion (XLIII)
2006	Freddie Roach	ILB	New England Patriots	—
2007	Tim Castille	FB	Arizona Cardinals	—
2007	Jeremy Clark	DT	Philadelphia Eagles	—
2008	Simeon Castille	CB	Cincinnati Bengals	—
2008	Wallace Gilberry	DE	Kansas City Chiefs	—
2011	Chavis Williams	OLB	Baltimore Ravens	—
2012	William Vlachos	C	Tennessee Titans	—
2013	Robert Lester	SS/FS	Carolina Panthers	—
2013	Damion Square	DT	Philadelphia Eagles	—
2013	Carson Tinker	LS	Jacksonville Jaguars	—
2014	Anthony Steen	OG	Arizona Cardinals	—
2015	Nick Perry	SS	Baltimore Ravens	—
2015	DeAndrew White†	WR	San Francisco 49ers	Practice Squad - Super Bowl Champion (LI)
2016	Jake Coker	QB	Arizona Cardinals	—
2016	Richard Mullaney	WR	Houston Texans	—
2017	Gehrig Dieter‡	WR	Kansas City Chiefs	Super Bowl Champion (LIV)
2018	Tony Brown	DB	Green Bay Packers	—
2018	Robert Foster	WR	Buffalo Bills	—
2018	Cam Sims	WR	Washington Redskins	—
2018	Levi Wallace	CB	Buffalo Bills	—
2019	Lester Cotton	OG	Oakland Raiders	—
2019	Hale Hentges	TE	Indianapolis Colts	—
2019	Cole Mazza	LS	Los Angeles Chargers	—
2020	Jared Mayden	SS	San Francisco 49ers	—
2021	Miller Forristall	TE	Tennessee Titans	—
2021	Dylan Moses	ILB	Jacksonville Jaguars	—
2022	Christopher Allen	OLB	Denver Broncos	—
2022	Slade Bolden	WR	Baltimore Ravens	—
2022	Josh Jobe‡	CB	Philadelphia Eagles	Super Bowl Champion (LX)
2022	LaBryan Ray	DE	New England Patriots	—
2023	D. J. Dale	NT/DT	Buffalo Bills	—
2023	Emil Ekiyor Jr.	OG	Indianapolis Colts	—
2023	Jaylen Moody	ILB	Cincinnati Bengals	—
2023	Eli Ricks‡	CB	Philadelphia Eagles	Super Bowl Champion (LIX)
2024	Darrian Dalcourt	OG	Baltimore Ravens	—
2025	James Burnip	P	New Orleans Saints	—
2025	CJ Dippre	TE	New England Patriots	—
2025	Kneeland Hibbett	LS	Miami Dolphins	—
2026	Kam Dewberry	OG	Atlanta Falcons	—
2026	Nikhai Hill-Green	LB	Los Angeles Rams	—
