= 1942 Southeastern Conference football season =

- Sport: Football
- Duration: September 18, 1942 – January 1, 1943
- Teams: 12
- Champion: Georgia

SEC seasons
- 1941 1943

1942 Southeastern Conference football standings
	Conf.					Overall
Team		W		L			W		L
No. 2 Georgia $	6	–	1	–	0	11	–	1	–	0
No. 5 Georgia Tech	4	–	1	–	0	9	–	2	–	0
No. 7 Tennessee	4	–	1	–	0	9	–	1	–	1
No. 18 Mississippi State	5	–	2	–	0	8	–	2	–	0
No. 10 Alabama	4	–	2	–	0	8	–	3	–	0
LSU	3	–	2	–	0	7	–	3	–	0
No. 16 Auburn	3	–	3	–	0	6	–	4	–	1
Vanderbilt	2	–	4	–	0	6	–	4	–	0
Florida	1	–	3	–	0	3	–	7	–	0
Tulane	1	–	4	–	0	4	–	5	–	0
Kentucky	0	–	5	–	0	3	–	6	–	1
Ole Miss	0	–	5	–	0	2	–	7	–	0
$ – Conference champion; Rankings from AP Poll

The 1942 Southeastern Conference football season was the tenth season of college football played by the member schools of the Southeastern Conference (SEC) and was a part of the 1942 college football season. Georgia compiled an 11–1 overall record, with a conference record of 6–1, and was SEC champion.

== Results and team statistics ==
Conf. rank	Team	Head coach	Overall record	Conf. record	AP final	PPG	PAG
1	Georgia	Wally Butts	11–1–0 (.917)	6–1–0 (.857)	No. 2	31.3	6.3
T–2	Georgia Tech	William Alexander	9–2–0 (.818)	4–1–0 (.800)	No. 5	19.9	7.9
T–2	Tennessee	John Barnhill	9–1–1 (.864)	4–1–0 (.800)	No. 7	23.5	5.5
4	Mississippi State	Allyn McKeen	8–2–0 (.800)	5–2–0 (.714)	No. 18	20.0	7.7
5	Alabama	Frank Thomas	8–3–0 (.727)	4–2–0 (.667)	No. 10	22.4	8.8
6	LSU	Bernie Moore	7–3–0 (.700)	3–2–0 (.600)		19.2	11.7
7	Auburn	Jack Meagher	6–4–1 (.591)	3–3–0 (.500)	No. 16	15.8	12.1
8	Vanderbilt	Red Sanders	6–4–0 (.600)	2–4–0 (.333)		23.2	11.3
9	Florida	Tom Lieb	3–7–0 (.300)	1–3–0 (.250)		10.6	18.5
10	Tulane	Claude Simons Jr.	4–5–0 (.444)	1–4–0 (.200)		13.4	17.1
T–11	Kentucky	Albert D. Kirwan	3–6–1 (.350)	0–5–0 (.000)		15.5	15.4
T–11	Ole Miss	Harry Mehre	2–7–0 (.222)	0–5–0 (.000)		14.7	18.1

Key
AP final = Rankings from AP sports writers. See 1942 college football rankings
PPG = Average of points scored per game
PAG = Average of points allowed per game

== Schedule ==
Index to colors and formatting
SEC member won
SEC member lost
SEC member tie
SEC teams in **bold**

=== Week Zero ===
Date	Visiting team	Home team	Site	Result	Attendance	Ref.
September 18	Chattanooga	**Auburn**	Cramton Bowl • Montgomery, AL	**W** 20–7	8,000	
September 19	Louisiana Normal	**LSU**	Tiger Stadium • Baton Rouge, LA	**W** 40–0		
September 19	**Florida**	Jacksonville NAS	Fairfield Stadium • Jacksonville, FL	**L** 7–20	8,500	
September 19	**Georgia**	**Kentucky**	DuPont Stadium • Louisville, KY	**UGA** 7–6	10,500	

=== Week One ===
Date	Visiting team	Home team	Site	Result	Attendance	Ref.
September 25	Jacksonville NAS	**Georgia**	Municipal Stadium • Macon, GA	**W** 14–0	11,000	
September 25	Southwestern Louisiana	**Alabama**	Cramton Bowl • Montgomery, AL	**W** 54–0		
September 25	**Kentucky**	Xavier	Xavier Stadium • Cincinnati, OH	**W** 35–19	12,000	
September 26	Union (TN)	**Mississippi State**	Scott Field • Starkville, MS	**W** 35–2	6,000	
September 26	Texas A&M	**LSU**	Tiger Stadium • Baton Rouge, LA (rivalry)	**W** 16–7	25,000	
September 26	Tennessee Tech	**Vanderbilt**	Dudley Field • Nashville, TN	**W** 52–0	6,000	
September 26	Randolph–Macon	**Florida**	Florida Field • Gainesville, FL	**W** 45–0	3,000	
September 26	**Tulane**	USC	Los Angeles Memorial Coliseum • Los Angeles, CA	**W** 27–13	45,000	
September 26	Western Kentucky State	**Ole Miss**	Hemingway Stadium • Oxford, MS	**W** 39–6	1,500	
September 26	**Tennessee**	South Carolina	Carolina Stadium • Columbia, SC (rivalry)	**T** 0–0	14,000	
September 26	**Auburn**	**Georgia Tech**	Grant Field • Atlanta, GA (rivalry)	**GT** 15–0	12,000	

=== Week Two ===
Date	Visiting team	Home team	Site	Result	Attendance	Ref.
October 2	**Ole Miss**	Georgetown	Griffith Stadium • Washington, DC	**L** 6–14	15,000	
October 3	Furman	**Georgia**	Sanford Stadium • Athens, GA	**W** 40–7	8,000	
October 3	**Georgia Tech**	Notre Dame	Notre Dame Stadium • South Bend, IN	**W** 13–6	20,545	
October 3	Fordham	**Tennessee**	Shields–Watkins Field • Knoxville, TN	**W** 40–14	25,000	
October 3	Purdue	**Vanderbilt**	Dudley Field • Nashville, TN	**W** 26–0	18,000	
October 3	**Florida**	Tampa	Phillips Field • Tampa, FL	**W** 26–6	6,500	
October 3	Washington and Lee	**Kentucky**	McLean Stadium • Lexington, KY	**W** 53–0		
October 3	**LSU**	Rice	Rice Field • Houston, TX	**L** 14–27	20,000	
October 3	**Mississippi State**	**Alabama**	Denny Stadium • Tuscaloosa, AL (rivalry)	**ALA** 21–6	18,000	
October 3	**Auburn**	**Tulane**	Tulane Stadium • New Orleans, LA (rivalry)	**AUB** 27–13	30,000	

=== Week Three ===
Date	Visiting team	Home team	Site	Result	Attendance	Ref.
October 10	Chattanooga	Georgia Tech	Grant Field • Atlanta, GA	**W** 30–12	12,000	
October 10	Dayton	Tennessee	Shields–Watkins Field • Knoxville, TN	**W** 34–6		
October 10	Pensacola NAS	Alabama	Murphy High School Stadium • Mobile, AL	**W** 27–0	8,000–10,000	
October 10	Rice	Tulane	Tulane Stadium • New Orleans, LA	**W** 18–7	25,000	
October 10	**Georgia**	Ole Miss	Crump Stadium • Memphis, TN	**UGA** 48–13	15,000	
October 10	**Mississippi State**	LSU	Tiger Stadium • Baton Rouge, LA	**LSU** 16–6	25,000	
October 10	**Auburn**	Florida	Florida Field • Gainesville, FL (rivalry)	**FLA** 6–0	10,000	
October 10	**Vanderbilt**	Kentucky	McLean Stadium • Lexington, KY (rivalry)	**VAN** 7–6		

=== Week Four ===
Date	Visiting team	Home team	Site	Result	Attendance	Ref.
October 16	**Florida**	Villanova	Shibe Park • Philadelphia, PA	**L** 3–13	8,051	
October 17	Davidson	No. 6 **Georgia Tech**	Grant Field • Atlanta, GA	**W** 33–0	10,000	
October 17	**Auburn**	Georgetown	Griffith Stadium • Washington, DC	**T** 6–6	12,500	
October 17	**Kentucky**	VPI	Victory Stadium • Roanoke, VA	**T** 21–21	10,000	
October 17	**Tulane**	No. 2 **Georgia**	Sanford Stadium • Athens, GA	**UGA** 40–0	18,000	
October 17	No. 15 **Tennessee**	No. 4 **Alabama**	Legion Field • Birmingham, AL (rivalry)	**ALA** 8–0	25,000	
October 17	**Mississippi State**	No. 12 **Vanderbilt**	Dudley Field • Nashville, TN	**MSS** 33–0	22,000	
October 17	**Ole Miss**	**LSU**	Tiger Stadium • Baton Rouge, LA (rivalry)	**LSU** 21–7	20,000	
^{#}Rankings from AP Poll released prior to game.

=== Week Five ===
Date	Visiting team	Home team	Site	Result	Attendance	Ref.
October 23	Villanova	**Auburn**	Cramton Bowl • Montgomery, AL	**W** 14–6	10,000	
October 24	No. 2 **Georgia**	Cincinnati	Nippert Stadium • Cincinnati, OH	**W** 35–13	15,000	
October 24	No. 6 **Georgia Tech**	Navy	Thompson Stadium • Annapolis, MD	**W** 21–0	20,000	
October 24	Furman	No. 17 **Tennessee**	Shields–Watkins Field • Knoxville, TN	**W** 52–7		
October 24	Georgia Pre-Flight	**LSU**	Tiger Stadium • Baton Rouge, LA	**W** 34–0	15,000	
October 24	Centre	**Vanderbilt**	Dudley Field • Nashville, TN	**W** 66–0	7,000	
October 24	No. 19 North Carolina	**Tulane**	Tulane Stadium • New Orleans, LA	**W** 29–14	22,000	
October 24	Arkansas	**Ole Miss**	Crump Stadium • Memphis, TN (rivalry)	**L** 6–7	15,000	
October 24	No. 16 **Mississippi State**	**Vanderbilt**	Florida Field • Gainesville, FL	**MSS** 26–12	8,000	
October 24	No. 3 **Alabama**	**Kentucky**	McLean Stadium • Lexington, KY	**ALA** 14–0	14,000	
^{#}Rankings from AP Poll released prior to game.

=== Week Six ===
Date	Visiting team	Home team	Site	Result	Attendance	Ref.
October 30	**Kentucky**	George Washington	Griffith Stadium • Washington, DC	**W** 27–6	5,000	
October 31	No. 5 **Georgia Tech**	Duke	Duke Stadium • Durham, NC	**W** 26–7	24,000	
October 31	Memphis State	**Ole Miss**	Hemingway Stadium • Oxford, MS (rivalry)	**W** 48–0		
October 31	**Florida**	Maryland	Griffith Stadium • Washington, DC	**L** 0–13	10,000	
October 31	No. 3 **Alabama**	No. 2 **Georgia**	Grant Field • Atlanta, GA (rivalry)	**UGA** 21–10	32,000–33,000	
October 31	No. 19 **LSU**	No. 20 **Tennessee**	Shields–Watkins Field • Knoxville, TN	**TEN** 26–0	15,000	
October 31	**Mississippi State**	**Auburn**	Legion Field • Birmingham, AL	**MSS** 6–0	7,000	
October 31	**Vanderbilt**	**Tulane**	Tulane Stadium • New Orleans, LA	**TUL** 28–21	15,000	
^{#}Rankings from AP Poll released prior to game.

=== Week Seven ===
Date	Visiting team	Home team	Site	Result	Attendance	Ref.
November 7	Cincinnati	No. 13 **Tennessee**	Shields–Watkins Field • Knoxville, TN	**W** 34–12	6,000	
November 7	South Carolina	**Alabama**	Denny Stadium • Tuscaloosa, AL	**W** 29–0	10,000	
November 7	**LSU**	Fordham	Polo Grounds • New York, NY	**W** 26–13	16,400	
November 7	**Auburn**	Georgia Pre-Flight	Memorial Stadium • Columbus, GA	**L** 14–41	6,500	
November 7	No. 1 **Georgia**	**Florida**	Fairfield Stadium • Jacksonville, FL (rivalry)	**UGA** 75–0	21,000	
November 7	**Kentucky**	No. 3 **Georgia Tech**	Grant Field • Atlanta, GA	**GT** 47–7	20,000	
November 7	**Mississippi State**	**Tulane**	Tulane Stadium • New Orleans, LA	**MSS** 7–0	28,000	
November 7	**Vanderbilt**	**Ole Miss**	Crump Stadium • Memphis, TN (rivalry)	**VAN** 19–0	6,000	
^{#}Rankings from AP Poll released prior to game.

=== Week Eight ===
Date	Visiting team	Home team	Site	Result	Attendance	Ref.
November 14	No. 1 **Georgia**	Chattanooga	Chamberlain Field • Chattanooga, TN	**W** 40–0	5,500	
November 14	Duquesne	**Mississippi State**	Scott Field • Starkville, MS	**W** 28–6	10,000	
November 14	Union (TN)	**Vanderbilt**	Dudley Field • Nashville, TN	**W** 27–0		
November 14	**Florida**	Miami (FL)	Burdine Stadium • Miami, FL (rivalry)	**L** 0–12	15,558	
November 14	Georgia Pre-Flight	**Tulane**	Tulane Stadium • New Orleans, LA	**L** 0–7	18,000	
November 14	West Virginia	**Kentucky**	McLean Stadium • Lexington, KY	**L** 0–7		
November 14	No. 5 **Alabama**	No. 2 **Georgia Tech**	Grant Field • Atlanta, GA (rivalry)	**GT** 7–0	34,000	
November 14	No. 11 **Tennessee**	**Ole Miss**	Crump Stadium • Memphis, TN	**TEN** 14–0	10,000	
November 14	**LSU**	**Auburn**	Legion Field • Birmingham, AL (rivalry)	**AUB** 25–7	8,000	
^{#}Rankings from AP Poll released prior to game.

=== Week Nine ===
Date	Visiting team	Home team	Site	Result	Attendance	Ref.
November 21	**Auburn**	No. 1 **Georgia**	Memorial Stadium • Columbus, GA (rivalry)	**AUB** 27–13	22,000	
November 21	**Florida**	No. 2 **Georgia Tech**	Grant Field • Atlanta, GA	**GT** 20–7	15,000	
November 21	**Kentucky**	No. 11 **Tennessee**	Shields–Watkins Field • Knoxville, TN (rivalry)	**TEN** 26–0	20,000	
November 21	**Ole Miss**	No. 16 **Mississippi State**	Scott Field • Starkville, MS (rivalry)	**MSS** 34–13	16,000	
November 21	**Vanderbilt**	No. 9 **Alabama**	Legion Field • Birmingham, AL	**ALA** 27–7	17,000	
^{#}Rankings from AP Poll released prior to game.

=== Week Ten ===
Date	Visiting team	Home team	Site	Result	Attendance	Ref.
November 26	**Tulane**	**LSU**	Tiger Stadium • Baton Rouge, LA (rivalry)	**LSU** 18–6	30,071	
November 28	Clemson	No. 16 **Auburn**	Auburn Stadium • Auburn, AL (rivalry)	**W** 41–13	10,000	
November 28	Georgia Pre-Flight	No. 7 **Alabama**	Legion Field • Birmingham, AL	**L** 19–35	7,000	
November 28	No. 2 **Georgia Tech**	No. 5 **Georgia**	Sanford Stadium • Athens, GA (rivalry)	**UGA** 34–0	45,000	
November 28	No. 10 **Tennessee**	**Vanderbilt**	Dudley Field • Nashville, TN (rivalry)	**TEN** 19–7	19,000	
^{#}Rankings from AP Poll released prior to game.

=== Week Eleven ===
Date	Visiting team	Home team	Site	Result	Attendance	Ref.
November 28	San Francisco	No. 18 **Mississippi State**	Crump Stadium • Memphis, TN	**W** 19–7	250	
^{#}Rankings from AP Poll released prior to game.

=== Postseason ===
Date	Visiting team	Home team	Site	Result	Attendance	Ref.
January 1, 1943	No. 13 UCLA	No. 2 **Georgia**	Rose Bowl • Pasadena, CA (Rose Bowl)	**W** 9–0	90,000	
January 1, 1943	No. 7 **Tennessee**	No. 4 Tulsa	Tulane Stadium • New Orleans, LA (Sugar Bowl)	**W** 14–7	70,000	
January 1, 1943	No. 10 **Alabama**	No. 8 Boston College	Burdine Stadium • Miami, FL (Orange Bowl)	**W** 37–21	25,166	
January 1, 1943	No. 18 Texas	No. 5 **Georgia Tech**	Cotton Bowl • Dallas, TX (Cotton Bowl Classic)	**L** 7–14	36,620	
^{#}Rankings from AP Poll released prior to game.

== All-conference players ==
The following players were recognized as consensus first-team honors from the Associated Press (AP) and United Press (UP) on the 1942 All-SEC football team:

- George Poschner, End, Georgia (AP-1, UP-1)
- Don Whitmire, Tackle, Alabama (AP-1, UP-1)
- Clyde Johnson, Tackle, Kentucky (AP-1, UP-1)
- Harvey Hardy, Guard, Georgia Tech (AP-1, UP-1)
- Joe Domnanovich, Center, Alabama (AP-1, UP-1)
- Clint Castleberry, Quarterback, Georgia Tech (AP-1, UP-1)
- Monk Gafford, Halfback, Auburn (AP-1, UP-1)
- Frank Sinkwich, Fullback, Georgia (AP-1, UP-1)

== All-Americans ==
Three SEC players were consensus first-team picks on the 1942 College Football All-America Team:

- Frank Sinkwich, Halfback, Georgia (AAB, AP, CO, INS, LK, NEA, NW, SN, UP)
- Joe Domnanovich, Center, Alabama (AAB, AP, CO, LK, NW, SN)
- Harvey Hardy, Guard, Georgia Tech (AP-2; INS-1; NEA-1; NW; UP-1; CP-1; NYS-1)

Other SEC players receiving All-American honors from at least one selector were:

- George Poschner, End, Georgia (AP-2; UP-2; SN-2; CP-3; NEA-2; MS-1)
- Al Hust, End, Tennessee (AP-3; INS-2; NEA-2)
- Don Whitmire, Tackle, Alabama (AP-3; SN-3; NEA-1)
- George Hecht, Guard, Alabama ( MS-1 [4-way tie])
- Clint Castleberry, Quarterback, Georgia Tech (AP-3; UP-2; SN-3; INS-2; NEA-2)
- Monk Gafford, Halfback, Auburn (AP-2; INS-1; CP-3; NYS-2; PL)
- J. T. "Blondy" Black, Halfback, Mississippi State (CP-3; NEA-3)

== Head coaches ==
Records through the completion of the 1942 season

Team	Head coach	Years at school	Overall record	Record at school	SEC record
Alabama	Frank Thomas	12	119–27–6 (.803)	93–18–5 (.823)	46–12–4 (.774)
Auburn	Jack Meagher	9	74–63–5 (.539)	48–37–10 (.558)	26–25–7 (.509)
Florida	Tom Lieb	3	59–51–4 (.535)	12–19–0 (.387)	4–9–0 (.308)
Georgia	Wally Butts	4	30–12–2 (.705)	30–12–2 (.705)	11–5–2 (.667)
Georgia Tech	William Alexander	23	118–89–15 (.565)	118–89–15 (.565)	26–31–5 (.460)
Kentucky	Albert D. Kirwan	5	21–22–4 (.489)	21–22–4 (.489)	3–17–3 (.196)
LSU	Bernie Moore	8	66–37–6 (.633)	54–25–3 (.677)	27–17–2 (.609)
Mississippi State	Allyn McKeen	4	47–11–2 (.800)	34–5–2 (.854)	16–4–2 (.773)
Ole Miss	Harry Mehre	5	92–49–7 (.645)	33–15–1 (.684)	22–23–3 (.490)
Tennessee	John Barnhill	2	17–3–1 (.833)	17–3–1 (.833)	7–2–0 (.778)
Tulane	Claude Simons Jr.	1	15–17–1 (.470)	4–5–0 (.444)	1–4–0 (.200)
Vanderbilt	Red Sanders	3	17–12–1 (.583)	17–12–1 (.583)	6–11–1 (.361)

== 1943 NFL draft ==
The following SEC players were selected in the 1943 NFL draft:

Round	Overall pick	Player name	School	Position	NFL team
1	1	Frank Sinkwich	Georgia	Halfback	Detroit Lions
1	10	Jack Jenkins	Vanderbilt	Halfback	Washington Redskins
2	12	Lamar Davis	Georgia	Back	Philadelphia Eagles
2	13	J. T. "Blondy" Black	Mississippi State	Back	Brooklyn Dodgers
3	17	Monk Gafford	Auburn	Back	Philadelphia Eagles
4	28	Joe Domnanovich	Alabama	Center	Brooklyn Dodgers
4	29	Al Hust	Tennessee	End	Chicago Cardinals
5	33	George Hecht	Alabama	Guard	Chicago Cardinals
5	34	Marty Comer	Tulane	End	Brooklyn Dodgers
5	35	Clyde Johnson	Kentucky	Tackle	Cleveland Rams
6	46	Jim Reynolds	Auburn	Back	New York Giants
8	61	George Poschner	Georgia	End	Detroit Lions
8	64	Bill Godwin	Georgia	Center	Chicago Cardinals
8	70	Tony Leon	Alabama	Guard	Washington Redskins
10	84	Fondren Mitchell	Florida	Back	Chicago Cardinals
10	90	Walt McDonald	Tulane	Back	Washington Redskins
12	103	Lou Thomas	Tulane	Back	Brooklyn Dodgers
12	108	Van Davis	Georgia	End	Green Bay Packers
12	110	Dan Wood	Ole Miss	Center	Washington Redskins
13	119	Clark Wood	Kentucky	Tackle	Chicago Bears
14	122	George Weeks	Alabama	End	Philadelphia Eagles
14	125	Sam Sharp	Alabama	End	Cleveland Rams
14	130	Oscar Britt	Ole Miss	Guard	Washington Redskins
15	132	Russ Craft	Alabama	Back	Philadelphia Eagles
17	152	Walt Gorinski	LSU	Back	Philadelphia Eagles
17	155	Walt Ruark	Georgia	Guard	Cleveland Rams
22	201	Percy Holland	LSU	Guard	Detroit Lions
23	213	Cliff Kimsey	Georgia	Back	Chicago Cardinals
24	230	Charlie Yancey	Mississippi State	Back	Washington Redskins
25	234	Gene Lee	Florida	Center	Brooklyn Dodgers
25	236	Dave Brown	Alabama	Back	New York Giants
25	240	Roman Bentz	Tulane	Tackle	Washington Redskins
29	273	Bill Edwards	LSU	Guard	Chicago Cardinals
29	274	Al Sabo	Alabama	Back	Brooklyn Dodgers
29	275	Floyd Konetsky	Florida	Guard	Cleveland Rams
30	285	Willie Miller	LSU	Guard	Cleveland Rams
31	295	Bill "Mother" Corry	Florida	Back	Washington Redskins
