= 1942 Alabama Crimson Tide football team =

American college football season

1942 Alabama Crimson Tide football

Orange Bowl champion

Orange Bowl, W 37–21 vs. Boston College
- Conference: Southeastern Conference

Ranking
- AP: No. 10
- Record: 8–3 (4–2 SEC)
- Head coach: Frank Thomas (12th season)
- Captain: Joe Domnanovich
- Home stadium: Denny Stadium; Legion Field; Cramton Bowl

1942 Southeastern Conference football standings
	Conf.					Overall
Team		W		L			W		L
No. 2 Georgia $	6	–	1	–	0	11	–	1	–	0
No. 5 Georgia Tech	4	–	1	–	0	9	–	2	–	0
No. 7 Tennessee	4	–	1	–	0	9	–	1	–	1
No. 18 Mississippi State	5	–	2	–	0	8	–	2	–	0
No. 10 Alabama	4	–	2	–	0	8	–	3	–	0
LSU	3	–	2	–	0	7	–	3	–	0
No. 16 Auburn	3	–	3	–	0	6	–	4	–	1
Vanderbilt	2	–	4	–	0	6	–	4	–	0
Florida	1	–	3	–	0	3	–	7	–	0
Tulane	1	–	4	–	0	4	–	5	–	0
Kentucky	0	–	5	–	0	3	–	6	–	1
Ole Miss	0	–	5	–	0	2	–	7	–	0
$ – Conference champion; Rankings from AP Poll

The 1942 Alabama Crimson Tide football team (variously "Alabama", "UA" or "Bama") represented the University of Alabama in the 1942 college football season. It was the Crimson Tide's 49th overall and 10th season as a member of the Southeastern Conference (SEC). The team was led by head coach Frank Thomas, in his 12th year, and played their home games at Denny Stadium in Tuscaloosa, Legion Field in Birmingham and at the Cramton Bowl in Montgomery. They finished the season with a record of eight wins and three losses (8–3 overall, 4–2 in the SEC) and with a victory in the Orange Bowl over Boston College.

The Crimson Tide opened the 1942 season with five consecutive victories, four of which were shutouts, and rose to the No. 3 spot in the AP Poll. They outscored their opponents 124 to 6 and defeated Southwestern Louisiana, Mississippi State, a team of former college all-stars playing for the Pensacola NAS, Tennessee and Kentucky. Against No. 2 ranked Georgia, Alabama surrendered a 10–0 fourth quarter lead and lost 21–10 to a Bulldogs squad that went on to capture a share of the 1942 national championship. The Crimson Tide went on to alternate wins and losses over their final four regular season games with victories over both South Carolina and Vanderbilt and losses to Georgia Tech and Georgia Pre-Flight. They then closed the season with a victory over Boston College in the Orange Bowl.

== Schedule ==
Date	Opponent	Rank	Site	Result	Attendance
September 25	Southwestern Louisiana*		Cramton Bowl; Montgomery, AL	W 54–0	
October 3	Mississippi State		Denny Stadium; Tuscaloosa, AL (rivalry)	W 21–6	18,000
October 10	Pensacola NAS*		Murphy High School Stadium; Mobile, AL	W 27–0	8,000–10,000
October 17	No. 15 Tennessee	No. 4	Legion Field; Birmingham, AL (Third Saturday in October)	W 8–0	25,000
October 24	at Kentucky	No. 3	McLean Stadium; Lexington, KY	W 14–0	14,000
October 31	vs. No. 2 Georgia	No. 3	Grant Field; Atlanta, GA (rivalry)	L 10–21	32,000–33,000
November 7	South Carolina*^{†}	No. 8	Denny Stadium; Tuscaloosa, AL	W 29–0	10,000
November 14	at No. 2 Georgia Tech	No. 5	Grant Field; Atlanta, GA (rivalry)	L 0–7	32,000
November 21	Vanderbilt	No. 9	Legion Field; Birmingham, AL	W 27–7	17,000
November 28	Georgia Pre-Flight*	No. 7	Legion Field; Birmingham, AL	L 19–35	7,000
January 1, 1943	vs. No. 8 Boston College*	No. 10	Burdine Stadium; Miami, FL (Orange Bowl)	W 37–21	25,166
*Non-conference game; ^{†}Homecoming; Rankings from AP Poll released prior to the game

== Rankings ==
Ranking movements Legend: ██ Increase in ranking ██ Decrease in ranking ( ) = First-place votes
	Week							
Poll	1	2	3	4	5	6	7	Final
AP	4 (10)	3 (8)	3 (6)	8	5	9	7	10

== Game summaries ==
=== Southwestern Louisiana ===
Team	1	2	3	4	Total
SW Louisiana	0	0	0	0	0
• Alabama	14	21	13	6	54

- Date: September 25
- Location: Cramton Bowl
  Montgomery, AL

To open the 1941 season, Alabama defeated the Southwestern Louisiana Institute Bulldogs (now known as the Louisiana–Lafayette Ragin' Cajuns) 54–0 at the Cramton Bowl on a Friday night. After Don Salls recovered a Bobby Voitier fumble on the Bulldogs' opening possession, Salls scored Alabama's first touchdown of the night on a 30-yard run on the possession that ensued. The Crimson Tide then extended their lead to 14–0 at the end of the first quarter after Russ Mosley threw a 47-yard touchdown pass to George Weeks. In the second quarter, Alabama scored a trio of touchdowns on Kenny Reese runs of 7 and 24-yards and on a 45-yard Norman Mosley run to make the halftime score 35–0. The second half saw many of Alabama's reserves play and three more touchdowns. In the third-quarter touchdowns were scored by Joe Domnanovich on a 25-yard interception return and on an Al Sabo reception. The Crimson Tide got their final points in the fourth quarter on a 2-yard Lou Scales touchdown run.

=== Mississippi State ===
Team	1	2	3	4	Total
Mississippi State	0	0	0	6	6
• Alabama	0	0	21	0	21

- Date: October 3
- Location: Denny Stadium
  Tuscaloosa, AL
- Game attendance: 18,000

In the first conference game of the season, Alabama defeated Mississippi State 21–6 in what was the first conference loss for the Maroons since the 1939 season. After a scoreless first half, Russ Craft scored all three of the Crimson Tide's touchdowns in the third quarter on runs of 3, 38 and 4-yards. Mississippi State responded in the fourth quarter with their only points of the afternoon on a 43-yard Billy Murphy touchdown pass to Kermit Davis to make the final score 21–6.

=== Pensacola NAS ===
Team	1	2	3	4	Total
Pensacola NAS	0	0	0	0	0
• Alabama	7	6	7	7	27

- Date: October 10
- Location: Mobile, AL
- Game attendance: 8,000–10,000

With the outbreak of World War II, many leaders in the military viewed football as a means to help develop leadership abilities and greater discipline in preparation for combat. As such, during this time colleges scheduled military schools and organizations for regular season football games. For their third game of the season, Alabama met the team that represented the Naval Air Station Pensacola at Mobile, and defeated the Goslings 27–0. The game also marked the first for Alabama against a service team since the 1917 season. In the game, Alabama scored a touchdown in all four quarters and outgained Pensacola in rushing yards 295 to minus 2. Touchdowns were scored by Russ Craft on a 3-yard run in the first, on a 5-yard Johnny August pass to Al Sabo in the second, Craft on a 6-yard reverse in the third and on a 39-yard Kenny Reese run in the fourth.

=== Tennessee ===
Third Saturday in October

Team	1	2	3	4	Total
#15 Tennessee	0	0	0	0	0
• #4 Alabama	0	0	2	6	8

- Date: October 17
- Location: Legion Field
  Birmingham, AL
- Game attendance: 25,000

After each team opened the season undefeated through the fourth week, Alabama entered the first AP Poll of the season as No. 4 team and Tennessee entered as the No. 15 team. Due to each team being ranked and the heated rivalry between each other, NBC broadcast the game nationally over 218 radio affiliates and Bill Stern served as commentator. In the game, Alabama defeated the Volunteers 8–0 before 25,000 fans at Legion Field. After a scoreless first half, the Crimson Tide scored their first points of the game on the opening kickoff of the second half. Alabama took a 2–0 lead after Bob Cifers was tackled in the endzone for a safety. The only touchdown of the contest was scored in the fourth quarter on a 38-yard Tom Jenkins run.

=== Kentucky ===
Team	1	2	3	4	Total
• #3 Alabama	0	0	7	7	14
Kentucky	0	0	0	0	0

- Date: October 24
- Location: McLean Stadium
  Lexington, KY
- Game attendance: 14,000

After their victory over Tennessee, Alabama moved up one position to the No. 3 spot in the AP Poll prior to their game at Kentucky. On what was homecoming in Lexington, the Crimson Tide shutout the Wildcats 14–0. After a scoreless first half, touchdowns were scored by Russ Mosley on a 2-yard run in the third and by Lou Scales on a 1-yard run in the fourth.

=== Georgia ===
Team	1	2	3	4	Total
#3 Alabama	7	0	3	0	10
• #2 Georgia	0	0	0	21	21

- Date: October 31
- Location: Grant Field
  Atlanta, GA
- Game attendance: 32,000–33,000

As both Alabama and Georgia were undefeated as they entered their game, both received top five rankings in the weekly AP Poll. Although the Crimson Tide led 10–0 at the start of the fourth quarter, three late touchdowns gave the Bulldogs the 21–10 victory at Grant Field in Atlanta. Russ Craft scored first for Alabama with his 47-yard touchdown run in the first quarter. Alabama then extended their lead to 10–0 early in the third quarter when George Hecht kicked a 20-yard field goal. In the fourth quarter, the Bulldogs staged their comeback to win the game 21–10. Fourth-quarter touchdowns were scored on Frank Sinkwich passes of 5 and 13-yards to George Poschner and by Andrew Dudish on a 25-yard fumble return.

=== South Carolina ===
Team	1	2	3	4	Total
South Carolina	0	0	0	0	0
• #8 Alabama	13	16	0	0	29

- Date: November 7
- Location: Denny Stadium
  Tuscaloosa, AL
- Game attendance: 10,000

After their loss to Georgia, the Crimson Tide dropped five places to the No. 8 position in the weekly AP Poll prior to their game against South Carolina. On homecoming at Denny Stadium, Alabama defeated the Gamecocks 29–0. Alabama took a 13–0 first quarter lead after Johnny August connected on touchdown passes of 24-yards to Kenny Reese and 38-yards to James Roberts. They then scored their final 16 points of the game in the second quarter on a 44-yard Russ Craft touchdown run, and 84-yard Dave Brown touchdown run and when the Gamecocks' Ken Roskie was tackled for a safety.

=== Georgia Tech ===
Team	1	2	3	4	Total
#5 Alabama	0	0	0	0	0
• #2 Georgia Tech	7	0	0	0	7

- Date: November 14
- Location: Grant Field
  Atlanta, GA
- Game attendance: 32,000

Prior to their second trip to Atlanta of the season, this time to face Georgia Tech, Alabama moved up from the No. 8 position to the No. 5 position in the AP Poll. Against the Yellow Jackets, the Crimson Tide was shutout 7–0 at Grant Field in a game that saw two dominant defenses. The only points of the game came in the first quarter when Ralph Plaster scored for Georgia Tech on a short run.

=== Vanderbilt ===
Team	1	2	3	4	Total
Vanderbilt	0	0	0	7	7
• #9 Alabama	7	7	13	0	27

- Date: November 21
- Location: Legion Field
  Birmingham, AL
- Game attendance: 17,000

After their loss against Georgia Tech, Alabama dropped down spots to the No. 9 position in the AP Poll prior to their game against Vanderbilt. Against the Commodores, Alabama rebounded from their loss to the Yellow Jackets with a 27–7 victory at Legion Field. First half touchdowns were scored by Johnny August on an 11-yard run in the first quarter and on a 1-yard Tom Jenkins run in the second quarter. The Crimson Tide extended their lead to 27–0 in the third quarter with touchdowns scored on a 5-yard Dave Brown run and on a 45-yard Bill Baughman interception return. The Commodores ended the shutout for the Alabama defense in the fourth quarter when Jack Jenkins scored on a 5-yard touchdown run.

=== Georgia Pre-Flight ===
Team	1	2	3	4	Total
• Georgia Pre-Flight	7	7	14	7	35
#7 Alabama	0	0	0	19	19

- Date: November 28
- Location: Legion Field
  Birmingham, AL
- Game attendance: 7,000

After their victory over Vanderbilt, Alabama moved up two spots to the No. 7 position in the AP Poll prior to their game against Georgia Pre-Flight. Against the Skycrackers, Alabama lost 35–19 at Legion Field to a team that featured several former college stars in addition to former Crimson Tide player and future coach Bear Bryant. The Skycrackers took a 7–0 lead in the first quarter after Thomas White blocked a Russ Mosley quick kick that was returned 40-yards by Darrell Tully for a Georgia touchdown. Tully then scored the second touchdown on a 9-yard run in the second quarter to cap a 70-yard drive and give the Skycrackers a 14–0 halftime lead. Georgia extended their lead further to 28–0 at the end of the third quarter with touchdowns on a 25-yard Frank Filchock pass to Bob Foxx and on a Jim Poole reception. In the fourth quarter, Alabama scored first on a 3-yard Don Salls touchdown run to cut the Georgia lead to 28–6. The Skycrackers responded with a 9-yard Filchock to Poole touchdown pass to extend their lead to 35–6. Alabama did score the final pair of touchdowns in the game on a 19-yard Tom Jenkins run and on a 21-yard Norman Mosley pass to Jim McWhorter to make the final score 35–19.

=== Boston College ===
Orange Bowl

Team	1	2	3	4	Total
• #10 Alabama	0	22	6	9	37
#8 Boston College	14	7	0	0	21

- Date: January 1
- Location: Burdine Stadium
  Miami, FL
- Game attendance: 25,166

After their loss to Georgia Pre-Flight in their regular season finale, on November 30 Alabama accepted an invitation to play in the Orange Bowl against the Boston College Eagles. At that time, the final AP Poll was also released with Alabama in the No. 10 position and Boston College in the No. 8 position. In the Orange Bowl, the Crimson Tide overcame a 14–0 first quarter deficit to defeat the Eagles 37–21. Boston College took a 14–0 lead with first-quarter touchdowns scored on a 65-yard Mike Holovak pass to Ed Doherty and on a 33-yard Holovak run. Alabama responded with three consecutive touchdowns in the second quarter to take a 19–14 lead on a 14-yard Russ Mosley pass to Wheeler Leeth, a 17-yard Johnny August pass to Ted Cook and on a 40-yard Tom Jenkins run. The Eagles then scored their final points of the game on a 1-yard Holovak touchdown run before the Crimson Tide took a 22–21 halftime lead on a 15-yard George Hecht field goal. Alabama went on to shutout the Eagles in the second half and score on a 15-yard August run in the third and on a 1-yard Jenkins run in the fourth. Joe Domnanovich then tackled Harry Connolly for a safety to make the final score 37–21.

== Personnel ==
=== Varsity letter winners ===
Player	Hometown	Position
Jack Aland	Birmingham, Alabama	Tackle
Johnny August	Shadyside, Ohio	Halfback
Andy Bires	Ambridge, Pennsylvania	End
Dave Brown	Birmingham, Alabama	Halfback
Charles Compton	Sylacauga, Alabama	Tackle
Ted Cook	Birmingham, Alabama	End
Russ Craft	Beach Bottom, West Virginia	Halfback
Joe Domnanovich	South Bend, Indiana	Center
Leon Fichman	Los Angeles, California	Tackle
George Gammon	Cullman, Alabama	Halfback
George Hecht	Chicago Heights, Illinois	Guard
Tom Jenkins	Talladega, Alabama	Fullback
Wheeler Leeth	Boaz, Alabama	End
Tony Leon	Follansbee, West Virginia	Guard
Jack McKewen	Birmingham, Alabama	Tackle
Ted McKosky	Monessen, Pennsylvania	Guard
Jim McWhorter	Athens, Georgia	Quarterback
Norman Mosley	Blytheville, Arkansas	Halfback
Russ Mosley	Blytheville, Arkansas	Halfback
Mitchell Olenski	Vestal, New York	Tackle
Kenny Reese	El Dorado, Arkansas	Halfback
George Richeson	Russellville, Alabama	Tackle
James Roberts	Blytheville, Arkansas	End
Al Sabo	Los Angeles, California	Quarterback
Don Salls	White Plains, New York	Fullback
Lou Scales	Glencoe, Alabama	Fullback
Sam Sharpe	Birmingham, Alabama	End
John Staples	Owensboro, Kentucky	Guard
George Weeks	Dothan, Alabama	End
Don Whitmire	Decatur, Alabama	Guard

=== Coaching staff ===
Name	Position	Seasons at Alabama	Alma mater
Frank Thomas	Head coach	12	Notre Dame (1923)
Lew Bostick	Assistant coach	1	Alabama (1939)
Paul Burnum	Assistant coach	13	Alabama (1922)
Pete Cawthon	Assistant coach	1	Southwestern (1918)
Hank Crisp	Assistant coach	22	VPI (1920)
Jess Foshee	Assistant coach	1	Alabama (1939)
Julius Papais	Assistant coach	1	Alabama (1942)

== After the season ==
=== NFL draft ===
Several players that were varsity lettermen from the 1942 squad were drafted into the National Football League (NFL) between the 1943 and 1945 drafts. These players included the following:

Year	Round	Overall	Player name	Position	NFL team
1943	4	28	Joe Domnanovich	Center	Brooklyn Dodgers
1943	5	33	George Hecht	Guard	Chicago Cardinals
1943	8	70	Tony Leon	Guard	Washington Redskins
1943	14	122	George Weeks	End	Philadelphia Eagles
1943	14	125	Sam Sharpe	End	Cleveland Rams
1943	15	132	Russ Craft	Back	Philadelphia Eagles
1943	25	236	Dave Brown	Back	New York Giants
1943	29	274	Al Sabo	Back	Brooklyn Dodgers
1944	9	78	Mitchell Olenski	Tackle	Brooklyn Tigers
1944	9	82	Don Whitmire	Tackle	Green Bay Packers
1944	22	221	Ted Cook	End	Brooklyn Tigers
1944	27	279	Andy Bires	End	New York Giants
1944	27	281	Jack McKewan	Tackle	Chicago Bears
1945	8	70	Johnny August	Back	Cleveland Rams
1945	13	125	Jack Aland	Tackle	Cleveland Rams
1945	17	170	Tom Jenkins	Back	Washington Redskins
1945	18	181	Jim McWhorter	Back	Detroit Lions
1945	23	239	Norman Mosley	Back	Philadelphia Eagles
1945	30	312	Charles Compton	Tackle	Cleveland Rams
1945	31	322	Ken Reese	Back	Philadelphia Eagles
1945	32	329	John Staples	Guard	New York Giants

== See also ==
- 1943 Alabama Informals football team the team that unofficially represented the University of Alabama in 1943.
