= Clint Castleberry =

American football player (1923–1944)

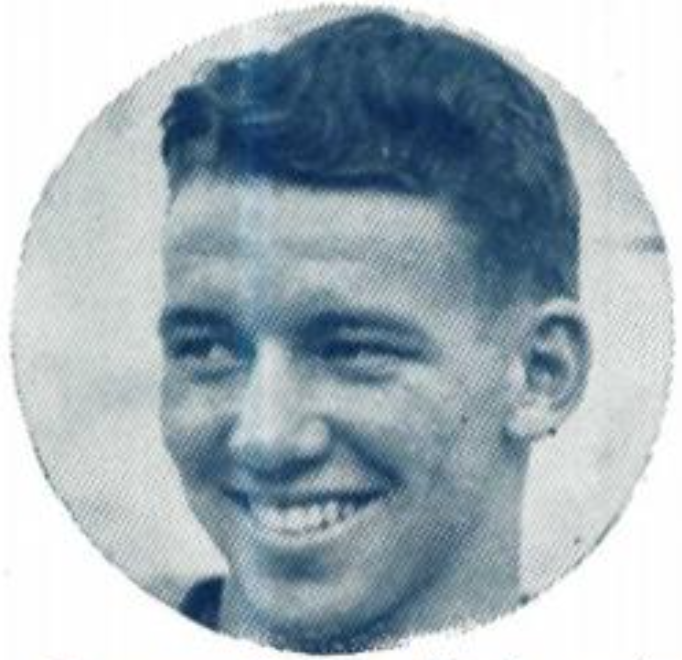
- Castleberry, c. 1942

No. 19 – Georgia Tech Yellow Jackets
- Position: Halfback

Personal information
- Born: October 10, 1923; Atlanta, Georgia, U.S.
- Died: November 7, 1944 (aged 21); Liberia
- Listed height: 5 ft 9 in (1.75 m)
- Listed weight: 155 lb (70 kg)

Career information
- High school: Boys (Atlanta, Georgia)

Awards and highlights
- Second-team All-American (1942); First-team All-SEC (1942); Georgia Tech Yellow Jackets No. 19 retired

Clint Castleberry
- Military career
- Allegiance: United States
- Branch: U.S. Army Air Forces
- Service years: 1943–1944
- Rank: Lieutenant
- Conflicts: World War II: Mediterranean

Clinton Dillard Castleberry Jr. (October 10, 1923 – November 7, 1944) was an American college football player in 1942, a halfback for the Georgia Tech Yellow Jackets. Future head coach Bobby Dodd, then an assistant, said that if Castleberry had lived to finish his playing career “he’d have probably been an All-American for three years and been the greatest back in Georgia Tech history.”

== College football ==
Castleberry showed extraordinary ability as a Georgia Tech "pony" back, standing at only 5 ft 9 in (1.75 m) and weighing only 155 lb (70 kg). At Boys High School in Atlanta, he averaged 171 rushing yards per game and scored 102 points. In 1942, freshmen were ruled eligible to play varsity ball as college rosters were drained by World War II, which allowed Castleberry to display his spectacular prowess early. On October 3, 1942, Georgia Tech beat Notre Dame for the first time since 1928, especially impressive as the game was played in South Bend and Notre Dame had not lost a game in two years. Castleberry led Georgia Tech in both passing and rushing yards, even after Notre Dame head coach Frank Leahy had been warned by a scout that Castleberry was "the most dangerous runner in America."

Against national power Navy, Castleberry led Tech to an impressive shutout win on October 24 in Annapolis, broadcast worldwide via the Armed Forces Radio Network. The momentum changer of the game occurred when Navy was driving for a score near the Tech goal line. Castleberry was put in to play defense on a passing situation on fourth down. He anticipated the Navy pass and stepped in front of the intended receiver for an interception. He scampered away with a dazzling run of 95 yards for a touchdown. Tech coach Bobby Dodd described it as “a magnificent run that I can still follow step by step in my mind. It shook Navy to its keel, and Tech won 21-0.” Dodd called it Castleberry's greatest play. The national press began to take notice of Castleberry.

Georgia Tech won its first nine games and climbed to a top five national ranking. During that ninth win, Castleberry injured his knee in a hard-fought 20–7 win over Florida in Atlanta. Despite the injury, Castleberry played in the final two games of the season, but not quite at full speed, and Georgia Tech dropped both. On New Year's Day, Tech traveled to the Cotton Bowl in Dallas, but lost a tight game to Texas, 14–7. Castleberry's injury improved for the bowl game, yet he was still not quite a hundred percent and the team finished at 9–2.

Castleberry was third in the Heisman Trophy voting, behind winner Frank Sinkwich of Georgia and runner-up Paul Governali of Columbia, both seniors. This was the highest a freshman had ever placed in the Heisman voting. Castleberry's number 19 is the only football jersey Georgia Tech has ever retired.

== Army Air Forces ==
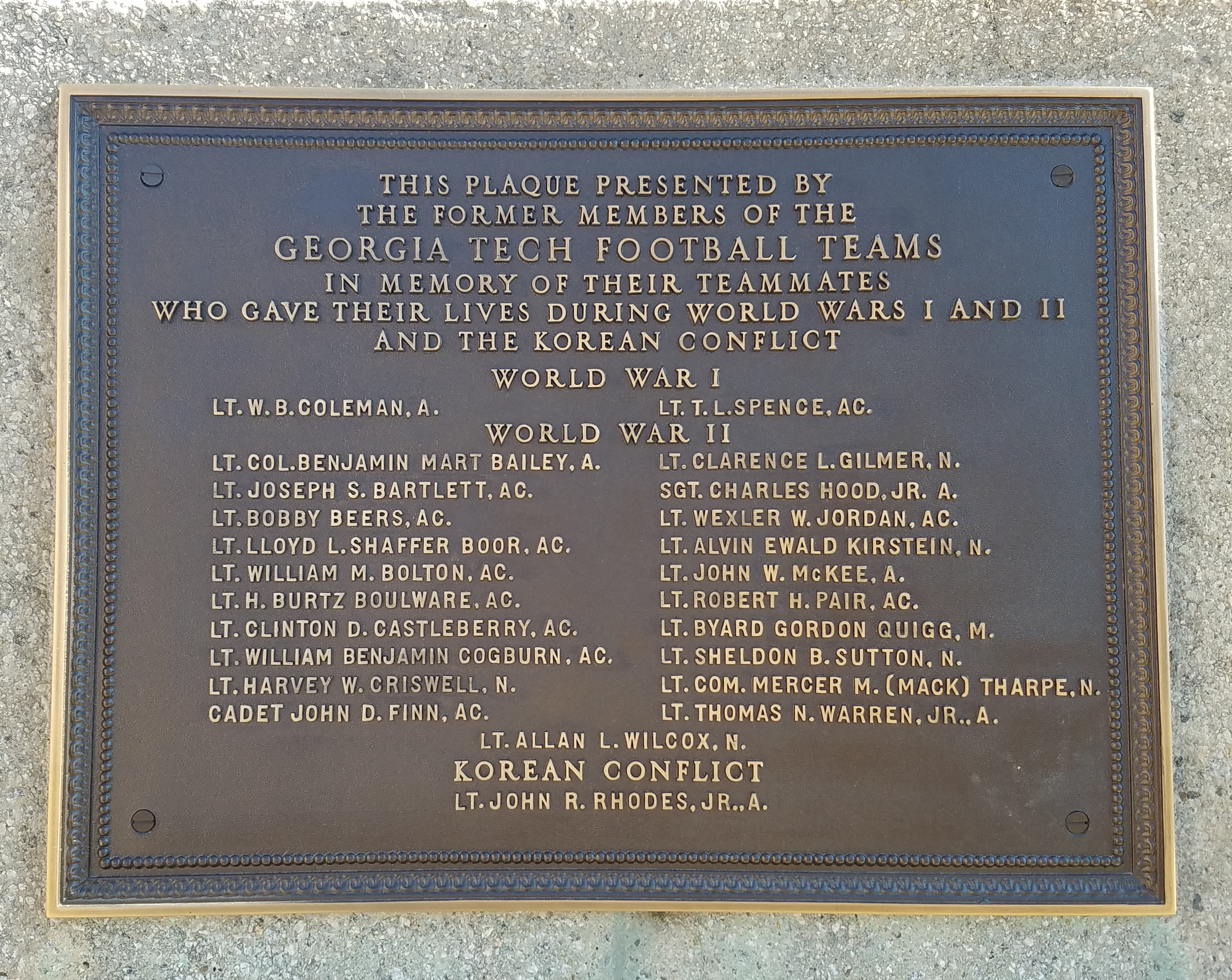
Memorial plaque at Georgia Tech listing Clint Castleberry

After the Cotton Bowl, Castleberry enlisted in the U.S. Army Air Forces in early 1943 and planned to return to play football at Georgia Tech after the war. He underwent surgery on February 2 at the Crawford Long Hospital in Atlanta to repair his damaged knee. Castleberry withdrew from Georgia Tech on February 18 and reported for military duty in Miami. After a physical evaluation by Army doctors, it was determined that he was fit for service.

Castleberry completed Army flight school training and earned his wings in the summer of 1944 and was sent to the Mediterranean theater in the fall. He co-piloted a B-26 Marauder bomber known as "Dream Girl" and was stationed in Africa. In the early morning hours of November 7, Lt. Castleberry took off from Roberts Field in Liberia with another B-26 to continue a ferrying run up the coast toward Dakar, Senegal. Neither of the two planes made it to their destination. An extensive six-day search involving American and British search crews was conducted. On November 23, 1944, all crew members were officially re-classified from MIA to KNB (killed, no body) after a Royal Air Force plane observed unidentified wreckage believed to have been from the missing planes.

== See also ==
- Georgia Tech Yellow Jackets football
- List of people who disappeared mysteriously at sea
