= Denny Myers =

American football player and coach (1905–1957)

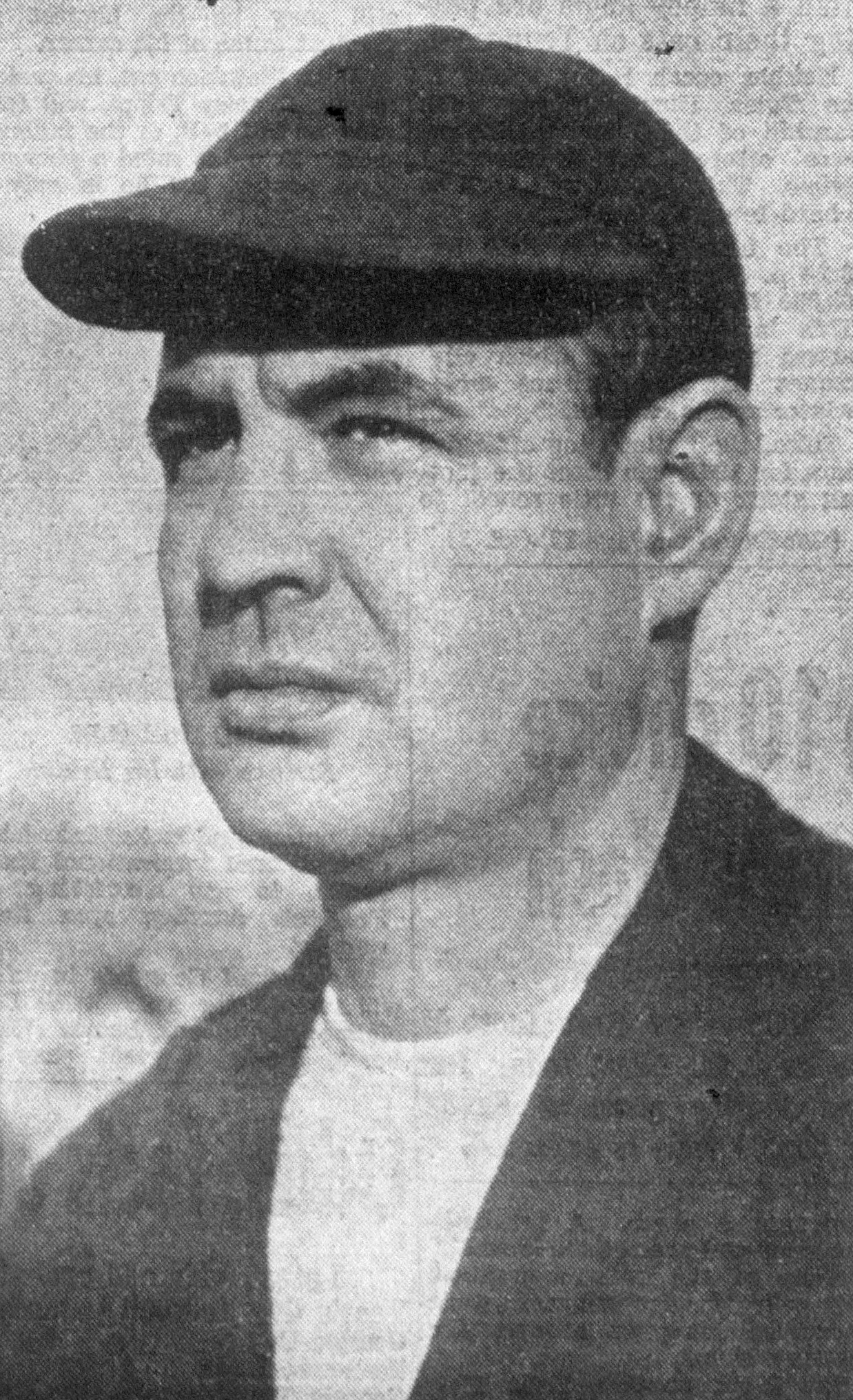
- Myers, circa 1942

Biographical details
- Born: August 27, 1907; Algona, Iowa, U.S.
- Died: May 30, 1957 (aged 49); Newton Centre, Massachusetts, U.S.

Playing career
- 1928–1930: Iowa
- 1931: Chicago Bears
- Position: Guard

Coaching career (HC unless noted)
- 1933: West Virginia (line)
- 1934–1935: Yale (line)
- 1936–1940: Brown (line)
- 1941–1942: Boston College
- 1943: Memphis NATTC
- 1946–1950: Boston College

Head coaching record
- Overall: 37–27–4
- Bowls: 0–1

Dennis Edward Myers (November 10, 1905 – May 30, 1957) was an American football player and coach. He attended the University of Iowa, where he played college football for the Hawkeyes. He then signed with the Chicago Bears of the National Football League (NFL) and played two games as a guard with the team in 1931. Myers served as the head football coach at Boston College from 1941 to 1942 and again from 1946 to 1950, compiling a record of 35–27–4.

== Coaching career ==
Myers left the NFL after one year and was hired as line coach at West Virginia University under Greasy Neale. Neale and Myers both moved to Yale University in 1934 to assist Ducky Pond. In 1936, Myers took the line coaching job at Brown University, where he worked for five years under Tuss McLaughry. On March 14, 1941, Myers was announced as the head football coach at Boston College, replacing Frank Leahy, who had left to coach the Notre Dame Fighting Irish. In his first two seasons, Myers posted records of 7–3 and 8–2 and led Boston College to the 1943 Orange Bowl, where the Eagles lost to Alabama, 37–21. In 1943, Myers left Boston College to serve in the United States Navy. After being discharged, he returned to Boston College. He posted three winning seasons from 1946 to 1948 and a 4–4–1 campaign in 1949, but was fired after a winless season in 1950. In seven seasons at Boston College, Myers compiled a record of 35–27–4.

== Head coaching record ==
Year	Team	Overall	Conference	Standing	Bowl/playoffs	Coaches^{#}	AP^{°}
Boston College Eagles (Independent) (1941–1942)
1941	Boston College	7–3					
1942	Boston College	8–2			L Orange		8
Memphis Naval Air Technical Training Center Bluejackets (Independent) (1943)
1943	Memphis NATTC	2–0					
Memphis NATTC:		2–0					
Boston College Eagles (Independent) (1946–1950)
1946	Boston College	6–3					
1947	Boston College	5–4					
1948	Boston College	5–2–2					
1949	Boston College	4–4–1					
1950	Boston College	0–9–1					
Boston College:		35–27–4					
Total:		37–27–4					

== See also ==
- List of college football head coaches with non-consecutive tenure
