= Paul Burnum =

American sports coach

Biographical details
- Born: February 6, 1900; Cullman, Alabama, U.S.
- Died: September 14, 1981 (aged 81); Tuscaloosa, Alabama, U.S.
- Education: Alabama

Coaching career (HC unless noted)

Football
- 1922: Denfeld HS (MN) (assistant)
- 1923–1924: Clio HS (AL)
- 1925–1929: Tuscaloosa HS (AL)
- 1930–1942: Alabama (Assistant)

Basketball
- 1942–1943: Alabama

Baseball
- 1943: Alabama

Head coaching record
- Overall: Basketball: 10–10; Baseball: 12–6

Paul Burnum (February 6, 1900 – September 14, 1981) was a coach of multiple sports at the University of Alabama, having served as head coach of the school's men's basketball and baseball teams and an assistant for the football team. He was also the head football coach at Tuscaloosa High School in the university's home city of Tuscaloosa, where he led the Black Bears to an undefeated record, five state championships and a pair of national championships during his five-year tenure there. After his career as a coach ended, Burnum worked in private business and served as a member of the Tuscaloosa City Board of Education. After his death in 1981, Burnum was posthumously inducted into Alabama Sports Hall of Fame.

== Early years ==
Paul Burnum was born on February 6, 1900, at Cullman, Alabama. He later attended the University of Alabama, and after he graduated in 1922, Burnum began his coaching career.

== Coaching career ==
=== Football ===
==== High school ====
After he served as an assistant coach at Denfeld High School in Duluth, Minnesota in 1922 and as head coach for two seasons at Clio High School in Clio, Alabama, Burnum began his five-year tenure with the Tuscaloosa High School Black Bears in 1925. In the season prior to his arrival, the Black Bears went winless; however, from 1925 through 1929 Burnum led Tuscaloosa to an overall record of 42 wins, zero losses and one tie (42–0–1). With his only blemish having been a 7–7 tie against Cullman High School in the final game of the 1925 season, Burnum led the Black Bears to four consecutive, undefeated seasons. For their overall efforts, the five Tuscaloosa teams coached by Burnum were retroactively recognized as state champions by The National Sports News Service.

In addition to his undefeated record and later recognition as state champions, both the 1926 and 1929 teams were later selected as the winner of the High School Football National Championship. Burnum also was known for having scheduled a series of intersectional games against other to high school teams of the period. These games included victories over Senn High School of Chicago in 1926, Lakeland High School in 1927, McKinley Technology High School of Washington, D.C. in 1928 and University City High School of University City, Missouri in 1929. His teams were so dominant that The Saturday Evening Post printed a story that implied Tuscaloosa High was solely a feeder school for players recruited by Alabama, however the story was later retracted.

==== College ====
After his successful tenure as head coach at Tuscaloosa High School, Burnum was hired to serve as an assistant coach on the Alabama football team in 1930. He was personally hired by University President George H. Denny and was paid a salary of $4,000 ($77,092 in 2025 dollars) for an initial contract of five years. He remained on staff as the freshman coach through 1941, and was promoted to the varsity as a line coach for the 1942 season. During his tenure, Burnum was known for his recruiting abilities and some of the players he helped bring to Alabama included Bear Bryant, Don Hutson, Dixie Howell and Joe Domnanovich. Burnum later resigned from his position with the Crimson Tide in February 1944.

=== Basketball ===
During his only season as head coach, he led Alabama to a record of ten wins and ten losses (10–10, 9–9 in the SEC). During the season, Burnum led the Crimson Tide to a 41–32 upset victory over Adolph Rupp's Kentucky Wildcats at Foster Auditorium.

==== Head coaching record ====
Record table
| Season | Coach | Overall | Conference | Standing | Postseason |
|---|---|---|---|---|---|
Alabama Crimson Tide (Southeastern Conference) (1942–1943)
| 1942–43 | Alabama | 10–10 | 9–9 | 7th | |
| Alabama: | | 10–10 | 9–9 | | |
| Total: | | 10–10 | 9–9 | | |

=== Baseball ===
In March 1943, Burnum was named head baseball coach for the Crimson Tide. The 1943 squad only had five returning lettermen that were part of the previous seasons SEC Championship team. During his only season as head coach, Burnum did not lose a single series and completed the season with a record of twelve wins and six losses (12–6, 9–4 in the SEC).

==== Head coaching record ====
Record table
| Season | Coach | Overall | Conference | Standing | Postseason |
|---|---|---|---|---|---|
Alabama Crimson Tide (Southeastern Conference) (1943)
| 1943 | Alabama | 12–6 | 9–4 | | |
| Alabama: | | 12–6 | 9–4 | | |
| Total: | | 12–6 | 9–4 | | |

== Later life ==
After his coaching career was completed in 1944, Burnum entered private business as president and general manager of Warrior Box & Lumber Company in Tuscaloosa. In December 1952, he was appointed to the Tuscaloosa City Board of Education by the City Commission to complete the term of a member who resigned from his post on the Board. He remained on the Board through July 1967 when he resigned his position due to poor health. He later died on September 14, 1981, at Druid City Hospital in Tuscaloosa. He was posthumously inducted into Alabama Sports Hall of Fame in 1982 in recognition of his contributions to sport in the state.
