= 1943 Orange Bowl =

American college football game

- 9th Orange Bowl
- Burdine Stadium in Miami, Florida, hosted the Orange Bowl.
Alabama Crimson Tide	Boston College Eagles
(7–3)	(8–1)
SEC	Independent
37	21
Head coach: Frank Thomas	Head coach: Denny Myers
AP 10	AP 8
	1	2	3	4	Total
Alabama	0	22	6	9	37
Boston College	14	7	0	0	21
- Date: January 1, 1943
- Season: 1942
- Stadium: Burdine Stadium
- Location: Miami, Florida
- Referee: L.L. McMasters (SEC)
- Attendance: 25,166

The 1943 Orange Bowl, part of the 1942 bowl game season, took place on January 1, 1943, at the Orange Bowl in Miami, Florida. The competing teams were the Alabama Crimson Tide, representing the Southeastern Conference (SEC) and the Boston College Eagles, competing as a football independent. Alabama won the game 37–21.

== Teams ==
=== Alabama ===
The 1942 Alabama squad finished the regular season 8–3 with losses coming to the Georgia Bulldogs, Georgia Tech Yellow Jackets and the Georgia Navy Pre-Flight (an all-star team of military personnel). The Monday following the 35–19 defeat against Georgia Navy Pre-Flight, Alabama accepted a bid to play in the Orange Bowl on New Years Day. The appearance marked the first for Alabama in the Orange Bowl, and their seventh overall.

=== Boston College ===
The 1942 Boston College squad entered their final game of the regular season against the rival Holy Cross Crusaders ranked No. 1 with a perfect record of 8–0. In the contest, the Crusaders upset the heavily favored Eagles by a final score of 55–12 resulting in Boston College losing their No. 1 ranking and finishing the regular season with a record of 8–1. The following Monday, the Eagles accepted a bid to play in the Orange Bowl on New Years Day. The appearance marked the first for Boston College in the Orange Bowl, and their third overall.

== Game summary ==
Looking to rebound from their loss to Holy Cross in the regular season finale, Boston College was looking for redemption against the Crimson Tide. With this mindset entering the game, the Eagles raced to a 14–0 first quarter lead. All-American fullback Mike Holovak scored both first-quarter touchdowns for the Eagles on a 65-yard reception from Edward Doherty and on a 33-yard run. Alabama responded with a 22 point second quarter to take a 22–21 lead at the half. Wheeler Leeth scored the Crimson Tide's first points on a 14-yard touchdown reception from Russ Mosley and Ted Cook had Alabama's second score on a 17-yard reception from Johnny August. George Hecht missed both extra points and Alabama only trailed by two 14–12. The teams then traded touchdown with Bama scoring on a 40-yard Tom Jenkins run and Boston College on a one-yard Mike Holovak run with a 15-yard George Hecht field goal at the end of the end of the quarter giving Alabama a 22–21 lead at halftime.

In the second half, the Alabama defense shutout the Boston College offense, and the offense scored two more touchdowns. Johnny August reached the endzone on a 15-yard touchdown run in the third and Tom Jenkins on a one-yard run in the fourth. The final points of the game came late in the fourth when on a punt the Eagles' Harry Connolly was tackled by Joe Domnanovich in the endzone for a safety on a failed punt attempt.

Scoring summary

Quarter	Time	Drive			Team	Scoring information	Score	
Quarter	Time	Plays	Yards	TOP	Team	Scoring information	Alabama	Boston College
1	13:35		67 yards, 2 plays		Boston College	Mike Holovak 65-yard touchdown reception from Edward Doherty, Harry Connolly kick good	0	7
1			74 yards, 8 plays		Boston College	Mike Holovak 33-yard touchdown run, Harry Connolly kick good	0	14
2			60 yards, 10 plays		Alabama	Wheeler Leeth 14-yard touchdown reception from Russ Mosley, George Hecht kick no good	6	14
2			33 yards, 4 plays		Alabama	Ted Cook 17-yard touchdown reception from Johnny August, George Hecht kick no good	12	14
2			58 yards, 4 plays		Alabama	Tom Jenkins 40-yard touchdown run, George Hecht kick good	19	14
2			58 yards, 4 plays		Boston College	Mike Holovak 1-yard touchdown run, Harry Connolly kick good	19	21
2			50 yards, 6 plays		Alabama	15-yard field goal by George Hecht	22	21
3			54 yards, 6 plays		Alabama	Johnny August 15-yard touchdown run, George Hecht kick no good	28	21
4			68 yards, 11 plays		Alabama	Tom Jenkins 1-yard touchdown run, George Hecht kick good	35	21
4					Alabama	Harry Connolly tackled in end zone for a safety by Joe Domnanovich	37	21
"TOP" = time of possession. For other American football terms, see Glossary of American football.							37	21
