= 1942 Tulane Green Wave football team =

American college football season

1942 Tulane Green Wave football
- Conference: Southeastern Conference
- Record: 4–5 (1–4 SEC)
- Head coach: Claude Simons Jr. (1st season)
- Captains: James Ely; Walter McDonald
- Home stadium: Tulane Stadium

1942 Southeastern Conference football standings
	Conf.					Overall
Team		W		L			W		L
No. 2 Georgia $	6	–	1	–	0	11	–	1	–	0
No. 5 Georgia Tech	4	–	1	–	0	9	–	2	–	0
No. 7 Tennessee	4	–	1	–	0	9	–	1	–	1
No. 18 Mississippi State	5	–	2	–	0	8	–	2	–	0
No. 10 Alabama	4	–	2	–	0	8	–	3	–	0
LSU	3	–	2	–	0	7	–	3	–	0
No. 16 Auburn	3	–	3	–	0	6	–	4	–	1
Vanderbilt	2	–	4	–	0	6	–	4	–	0
Florida	1	–	3	–	0	3	–	7	–	0
Tulane	1	–	4	–	0	4	–	5	–	0
Kentucky	0	–	5	–	0	3	–	6	–	1
Ole Miss	0	–	5	–	0	2	–	7	–	0
$ – Conference champion; Rankings from AP Poll

The 1942 Tulane Green Wave football team was an American football team that represented Tulane University as a member of the Southeastern Conference (SEC) during the 1942 college football season. In its first year under head coach Claude Simons Jr., Tulane compiled a 4–5 record (1–4 in conference games), finished tenth in the SEC, and was outscored by a total of 154 to 121. Tulane was ranked No. 31 in the final Litkenhous Ratings released in December 1942.

Three Tulane players received recognition on the 1942 All-SEC football team: end Marty Comer (AP-2, UP-1); halfback Walter McDonald (AP-2); and halfback Lou Thomas (AP-3).

The Green Wave played its home games at Tulane Stadium in New Orleans.

== Schedule ==
Date	Opponent	Site	Result	Attendance	Source
September 26	at USC*	Los Angeles Memorial Coliseum; Los Angeles, CA	W 27–13	45,000	
October 3	Auburn	Tulane Stadium; New Orleans, LA (rivalry)	L 13–27	30,000	
October 10	Rice*	Tulane Stadium; New Orleans, LA	W 18–7	25,000	
October 17	at No. 2 Georgia	Sanford Stadium; Athens, GA	L 0–40	18,000	
October 24	No. 19 North Carolina*	Tulane Stadium; New Orleans, LA	W 29–14	22,000	
October 31	Vanderbilt	Tulane Stadium; New Orleans, LA	W 28–21	15,000	
November 7	Mississippi State	Tulane Stadium; New Orleans, LA	L 0–7	28,000	
November 14	Georgia Pre-Flight*	Tulane Stadium; New Orleans, LA	L 0–7	18,000	
November 26	at LSU	Tiger Stadium; Baton Rouge, LA (Battle for the Rag)	L 6–18	30,071	
*Non-conference game; Rankings from AP Poll released prior to the game
