= Poschner =

Poschner is a surname. Notable people with the surname include:

- George Poschner (1919–2004), American football end
- Gerhard Poschner (born 1969), German footballer
- Markus Poschner (born 1971), German conductor and pianist
