= 1942 Mississippi State Maroons football team =

American college football season

1942 Mississippi State Maroons football
- Conference: Southeastern Conference

Ranking
- AP: No. 18
- Record: 8–2 (5–2 SEC)
- Head coach: Allyn McKeen (4th season)
- Home stadium: Scott Field

1942 Southeastern Conference football standings
	Conf.					Overall
Team		W		L			W		L
No. 2 Georgia $	6	–	1	–	0	11	–	1	–	0
No. 5 Georgia Tech	4	–	1	–	0	9	–	2	–	0
No. 7 Tennessee	4	–	1	–	0	9	–	1	–	1
No. 18 Mississippi State	5	–	2	–	0	8	–	2	–	0
No. 10 Alabama	4	–	2	–	0	8	–	3	–	0
LSU	3	–	2	–	0	7	–	3	–	0
No. 16 Auburn	3	–	3	–	0	6	–	4	–	1
Vanderbilt	2	–	4	–	0	6	–	4	–	0
Florida	1	–	3	–	0	3	–	7	–	0
Tulane	1	–	4	–	0	4	–	5	–	0
Kentucky	0	–	5	–	0	3	–	6	–	1
Ole Miss	0	–	5	–	0	2	–	7	–	0
$ – Conference champion; Rankings from AP Poll

The 1942 Mississippi State Maroons football team was an American football team that represented Mississippi State College (now known as Mississippi State University) as a member of the Southeastern Conference (SEC) during the 1942 college football season. In their fourth year under head coach Allyn McKeen, the Maroons compiled an overall record of 8–2, with a conference record of 5–2, and finished fourth in the SEC.

== Schedule ==
Date	Opponent	Rank	Site	Result	Attendance	Source
September 26	Union (TN)*		Scott Field; Starkville, MS	W 35–2	6,000	
October 3	at Alabama		Denny Stadium; Tuscaloosa, AL (rivalry)	L 6–21	18,000	
October 10	at LSU		Tiger Stadium; Baton Rouge, LA (rivalry)	L 6–16	25,000	
October 17	at No. 12 Vanderbilt		Dudley Field; Nashville, TN	W 33–0	22,000	
October 24	at Florida	No. 16	Florida Field; Gainesville, FL	W 26–12	8,000	
October 31	at Auburn		Legion Field; Birmingham, AL	W 6–0	7,000	
November 7	at Tulane		Tulane Stadium; New Orleans, LA	W 7–0	28,000	
November 14	Duquesne*^{†}		Scott Field; Starkville, MS	W 28–6	10,000	
November 21	Ole Miss	No. 16	Scott Field; Starkville, MS (Egg Bowl)	W 34–13	16,000	
December 5	vs. San Francisco*	No. 18	Crump Stadium; Memphis, TN	W 19–7	250	
*Non-conference game; ^{†}Homecoming; Rankings from AP Poll released prior to the game

== Rankings ==
Ranking movements Legend: ██ Increase in ranking ██ Decrease in ranking — = Not ranked т = Tied with team above or below
	Week							
Poll	1	2	3	4	5	6	7	Final
AP	—	16	—	—	—	—	16т	18
