= 1942 LSU Tigers football team =

American college football season

1942 LSU Tigers football
- Conference: Southeastern Conference
- Record: 7–3 (3–2 SEC)
- Head coach: Bernie Moore (8th season)
- Home stadium: Tiger Stadium

1942 Southeastern Conference football standings
	Conf.					Overall
Team		W		L			W		L
No. 2 Georgia $	6	–	1	–	0	11	–	1	–	0
No. 5 Georgia Tech	4	–	1	–	0	9	–	2	–	0
No. 7 Tennessee	4	–	1	–	0	9	–	1	–	1
No. 18 Mississippi State	5	–	2	–	0	8	–	2	–	0
No. 10 Alabama	4	–	2	–	0	8	–	3	–	0
LSU	3	–	2	–	0	7	–	3	–	0
No. 16 Auburn	3	–	3	–	0	6	–	4	–	1
Vanderbilt	2	–	4	–	0	6	–	4	–	0
Florida	1	–	3	–	0	3	–	7	–	0
Tulane	1	–	4	–	0	4	–	5	–	0
Kentucky	0	–	5	–	0	3	–	6	–	1
Ole Miss	0	–	5	–	0	2	–	7	–	0
$ – Conference champion; Rankings from AP Poll

The 1942 LSU Tigers football team was an American football team that represented Louisiana State University (LSU) as a member of the Southeastern Conference (SEC) during the 1942 college football season. In their eighth year under head coach Bernie Moore, the Tigers compiled an overall record of 7–3, with a conference record of 3–2, and finished sixth in the SEC.

LSU was ranked at No. 19 (out of 590 college and military teams) in the final rankings under the Litkenhous Difference by Score System for 1942.

== Schedule ==
Date	Opponent	Rank	Site	Result	Attendance	Source
September 19	Louisiana Normal*		Tiger Stadium; Baton Rouge, LA	W 40–0		
September 26	Texas A&M*		Tiger Stadium; Baton Rouge, LA (rivalry)	W 16–7	25,000	
October 3	at Rice*		Rice Field; Houston, TX	L 14–27	20,000	
October 10	Mississippi State		Tiger Stadium; Baton Rouge, LA (rivalry)	W 16–6	25,000	
October 17	Ole Miss^{†}		Tiger Stadium; Baton Rouge, LA (rivalry)	W 21–7	20,000	
October 24	Georgia Pre-Flight*		Tiger Stadium; Baton Rouge, LA	W 34–0	15,000	
October 31	at No. 20 Tennessee	No. 19	Shields–Watkins Field; Knoxville, TN	L 0–26	15,000	
November 7	at Fordham*		Polo Grounds; New York, NY	W 26–13	16,400	
November 14	at Auburn		Legion Field; Birmingham, AL (rivalry)	L 7–25	8,000	
November 26	Tulane		Tiger Stadium; Baton Rouge, LA (Battle for the Rag)	W 18–6	30,071	
*Non-conference game; ^{†}Homecoming; Rankings from AP Poll released prior to the game

== Rankings ==
Ranking movements Legend: ██ Increase in ranking ██ Decrease in ranking — = Not ranked
	Week							
Poll	1	2	3	4	5	6	7	Final
AP	—	—	19	—	—	—	—	—
