= 1942 Auburn Tigers football team =

American college football season

1942 Auburn Tigers football
- Conference: Southeastern Conference

Ranking
- AP: No. 16
- Record: 6–4–1 (3–3 SEC)
- Head coach: Jack Meagher (9th season)
- Home stadium: Auburn Stadium; Legion Field; Cramton Bowl

1942 Southeastern Conference football standings
	Conf.					Overall
Team		W		L			W		L
No. 2 Georgia $	6	–	1	–	0	11	–	1	–	0
No. 5 Georgia Tech	4	–	1	–	0	9	–	2	–	0
No. 7 Tennessee	4	–	1	–	0	9	–	1	–	1
No. 18 Mississippi State	5	–	2	–	0	8	–	2	–	0
No. 10 Alabama	4	–	2	–	0	8	–	3	–	0
LSU	3	–	2	–	0	7	–	3	–	0
No. 16 Auburn	3	–	3	–	0	6	–	4	–	1
Vanderbilt	2	–	4	–	0	6	–	4	–	0
Florida	1	–	3	–	0	3	–	7	–	0
Tulane	1	–	4	–	0	4	–	5	–	0
Kentucky	0	–	5	–	0	3	–	6	–	1
Ole Miss	0	–	5	–	0	2	–	7	–	0
$ – Conference champion; Rankings from AP Poll

The 1942 Auburn Tigers football team represented Auburn University in the 1942 college football season. The Tigers' were led by head coach Jack Meagher in his ninth season and finished the season with a record of six wins, four losses and one tie (6–4–1 overall, 3–3 in the SEC).

== Schedule ==
Date	Opponent	Rank	Site	Result	Attendance	Source
September 18	Chattanooga*		Cramton Bowl; Montgomery, AL	W 20–7	8,000	
September 26	at Georgia Tech		Grant Field; Atlanta, GA (rivalry)	L 0–15	10,000	
October 3	at Tulane		Tulane Stadium; New Orleans, LA (rivalry)	W 27–13	30,000	
October 10	at Florida		Florida Field; Gainesville, FL (rivalry)	L 0–6	10,000	
October 17	at Georgetown*		Griffith Stadium; Washington, DC	T 6–6	12,500	
October 23	Villanova*		Cramton Bowl; Montgomery, AL	W 14–6	10,000	
October 31	Mississippi State		Legion Field; Birmingham, AL	L 0–6	7,000	
November 7	vs. Georgia Pre-Flight*		Memorial Stadium; Columbus, GA	L 14–41	6,500	
November 14	LSU		Legion Field; Birmingham, AL (rivalry)	W 25–7	8,000	
November 21	vs. 1 Georgia		Memorial Stadium; Columbus, GA (rivalry)	W 27–13	22,000	
November 28	Clemson*^{†}	No. 16	Auburn Stadium; Auburn, AL (rivalry)	W 41–13	10,000	
*Non-conference game; ^{†}Homecoming; Rankings from AP Poll released prior to the game

== Rankings ==
Ranking movements Legend: ██ Increase in ranking ██ Decrease in ranking — = Not ranked т = Tied with team above or below
	Week							
Poll	1	2	3	4	5	6	7	Final
AP	—	—	—	—	—	—	16т	16
