= 1942 Vanderbilt Commodores football team =

American college football season

1942 Vanderbilt Commodores football
- Conference: Southeastern Conference
- Record: 6–4 (2–4 SEC)
- Head coach: Red Sanders (3rd season)
- Offensive scheme: Single-wing
- Captain: Fred Holder
- Home stadium: Dudley Field

1942 Southeastern Conference football standings
| | Conf. | | | | | Overall |
| Team | | W | | L | | | W | | L |
|---|---|---|---|---|---|---|---|---|---|---|
| No. 2 Georgia $ | 6 | – | 1 | – | 0 | 11 | – | 1 | – | 0 |
| No. 5 Georgia Tech | 4 | – | 1 | – | 0 | 9 | – | 2 | – | 0 |
| No. 7 Tennessee | 4 | – | 1 | – | 0 | 9 | – | 1 | – | 1 |
| No. 18 Mississippi State | 5 | – | 2 | – | 0 | 8 | – | 2 | – | 0 |
| No. 10 Alabama | 4 | – | 2 | – | 0 | 8 | – | 3 | – | 0 |
| LSU | 3 | – | 2 | – | 0 | 7 | – | 3 | – | 0 |
| No. 16 Auburn | 3 | – | 3 | – | 0 | 6 | – | 4 | – | 1 |
| Vanderbilt | 2 | – | 4 | – | 0 | 6 | – | 4 | – | 0 |
| Florida | 1 | – | 3 | – | 0 | 3 | – | 7 | – | 0 |
| Tulane | 1 | – | 4 | – | 0 | 4 | – | 5 | – | 0 |
| Kentucky | 0 | – | 5 | – | 0 | 3 | – | 6 | – | 1 |
| Ole Miss | 0 | – | 5 | – | 0 | 2 | – | 7 | – | 0 |
$ – Conference champion; Rankings from AP Poll

The 1942 Vanderbilt Commodores football team was an American football team that represented Vanderbilt University as a member of the Southeastern Conference (SEC) during the 1942 college football season. In their third year under head coach Red Sanders, the Commodores compiled an overall record of 6–4, with a conference record of 2–4, and finished eighth in the SEC.

Vanderbilt was ranked at No. 27 (out of 590 college and military teams) in the final rankings under the Litkenhous Difference by Score System for 1942.

== Schedule ==
| Date | Opponent | Rank | Site | Result | Attendance | Source |
|---|---|---|---|---|---|---|
| September 26 | Tennessee Tech* | | Dudley Field; Nashville, TN | W 52–0 | 6,000 | |
| October 3 | Purdue* | | Dudley Field; Nashville, TN | W 26–0 | 18,000 | |
| October 10 | at Kentucky | | Stoll Field/McLean Stadium; Lexington, KY (rivalry) | W 7–6 | | |
| October 17 | Mississippi State | No. 12 | Dudley Field; Nashville, TN | L 0–33 | 22,000 | |
| October 24 | Centre* | | Dudley Field; Nashville, TN | W 66–0 | 7,000 | |
| October 31 | at Tulane | | Tulane Stadium; New Orleans, LA | L 21–28 | 15,000 | |
| November 7 | vs. Ole Miss | | Crump Stadium; Memphis, TN (rivalry) | W 19–0 | 6,000 | |
| November 14 | Union (TN)* | | Dudley Field; Nashville, TN | W 27–0 | | |
| November 21 | at No. 9 Alabama | | Legion Field; Birmingham, AL | L 7–27 | 17,000 | |
| November 28 | No. 10 Tennessee | | Dudley Field; Nashville, TN (rivalry) | L 7–19 | 19,000 | |
*Non-conference game; Rankings from AP Poll released prior to the game

== Rankings ==
Ranking movements Legend: ██ Increase in ranking ██ Decrease in ranking — = Not ranked
| | Week | | | | | | | |
| Poll | 1 | 2 | 3 | 4 | 5 | 6 | 7 | Final |
|---|---|---|---|---|---|---|---|---|
| AP | 12 | — | — | — | — | — | — | — |
