= 1942 Tennessee Volunteers football team =

American college football season

1942 Tennessee Volunteers football

Sugar Bowl champion

Sugar Bowl, W 14–7 vs. Tulsa
- Conference: Southeastern Conference

Ranking
- AP: No. 7
- Record: 9–1–1 (4–1 SEC)
- Head coach: John Barnhill (2nd season)
- Home stadium: Shields–Watkins Field

1942 Southeastern Conference football standings
	Conf.					Overall
Team		W		L			W		L
No. 2 Georgia $	6	–	1	–	0	11	–	1	–	0
No. 5 Georgia Tech	4	–	1	–	0	9	–	2	–	0
No. 7 Tennessee	4	–	1	–	0	9	–	1	–	1
No. 18 Mississippi State	5	–	2	–	0	8	–	2	–	0
No. 10 Alabama	4	–	2	–	0	8	–	3	–	0
LSU	3	–	2	–	0	7	–	3	–	0
No. 16 Auburn	3	–	3	–	0	6	–	4	–	1
Vanderbilt	2	–	4	–	0	6	–	4	–	0
Florida	1	–	3	–	0	3	–	7	–	0
Tulane	1	–	4	–	0	4	–	5	–	0
Kentucky	0	–	5	–	0	3	–	6	–	1
Ole Miss	0	–	5	–	0	2	–	7	–	0
$ – Conference champion; Rankings from AP Poll

The 1942 Tennessee Volunteers (variously Tennessee, UT, or the Vols) represented the University of Tennessee in the 1942 college football season. Playing as a member of the Southeastern Conference (SEC), the team was led by head coach John Barnhill, in his second year, and played their home games at Shields–Watkins Field in Knoxville, Tennessee. They finished the season with a record of nine wins, one loss and one tie (9–1–1 overall, 4–1 in the SEC), and concluded the season with a victory against Tulsa in the 1943 Sugar Bowl.

== Schedule ==
Date	Opponent	Rank	Site	Result	Attendance	Source
September 26	at South Carolina*		Carolina Stadium; Columbia, SC (rivalry)	T 0–0	14,000	
October 3	Fordham*		Shields–Watkins Field; Knoxville, TN	W 40–14	25,000	
October 10	Dayton*		Shields–Watkins Field; Knoxville, TN	W 34–6		
October 17	at No. 4 Alabama	No. 15	Legion Field; Birmingham, AL (rivalry)	L 0–8	25,000	
October 24	Furman*	No. 17	Shields–Watkins Field; Knoxville, TN	W 52–7		
October 31	No. 19 LSU	No. 20	Shields–Watkins Field; Knoxville, TN	W 26–0	15,000	
November 7	Cincinnati*	No. 13	Shields–Watkins Field; Knoxville, TN	W 34–12	6,000	
November 14	vs. Ole Miss	No. 11	Crump Stadium; Memphis, TN (rivalry)	W 14–0	10,000	
November 21	Kentucky^{†}	No. 11	Shields–Watkins Field; Knoxville, TN (rivalry)	W 26–0	20,000	
November 28	at Vanderbilt	No. 10	Dudley Field; Nashville, TN (rivalry)	W 19–7	19,000	
January 1	vs. No. 4 Tulsa	No. 7	Tulane Stadium; New Orleans, LA (Sugar Bowl)	W 14–7	70,000	
*Non-conference game; ^{†}Homecoming; Rankings from AP Poll released prior to the game

== Rankings ==
Ranking movements Legend: ██ Increase in ranking ██ Decrease in ranking т = Tied with team above or below ( ) = First-place votes
	Week							
Poll	1	2	3	4	5	6	7	Final
AP	15т (1)	17т	20	13	11	11	10	7

== Team players drafted into the NFL ==
Player	Position	Round	Pick	NFL club
Al Hust	End	3	29	Chicago Cardinals
