= 1942 Ole Miss Rebels football team =

American college football season

1942 Ole Miss Rebels football
- Conference: Southeastern Conference
- Record: 2–7 (0–5 SEC)
- Head coach: Harry Mehre (5th season)
- Home stadium: Hemingway Stadium; Crump Stadium

1942 Southeastern Conference football standings
	Conf.					Overall
Team		W		L			W		L
No. 2 Georgia $	6	–	1	–	0	11	–	1	–	0
No. 5 Georgia Tech	4	–	1	–	0	9	–	2	–	0
No. 7 Tennessee	4	–	1	–	0	9	–	1	–	1
No. 18 Mississippi State	5	–	2	–	0	8	–	2	–	0
No. 10 Alabama	4	–	2	–	0	8	–	3	–	0
LSU	3	–	2	–	0	7	–	3	–	0
No. 16 Auburn	3	–	3	–	0	6	–	4	–	1
Vanderbilt	2	–	4	–	0	6	–	4	–	0
Florida	1	–	3	–	0	3	–	7	–	0
Tulane	1	–	4	–	0	4	–	5	–	0
Kentucky	0	–	5	–	0	3	–	6	–	1
Ole Miss	0	–	5	–	0	2	–	7	–	0
$ – Conference champion; Rankings from AP Poll

The 1942 Ole Miss Rebels football team was an American football team that represented the University of Mississippi (Ole Miss) as a member of the Southeastern Conference (SEC) during the 1942 college football season. In their fifrth year under head coach Harry Mehre, the Rebels compiled an overall record of 2–7, with a conference record of 0–5, and finished 12th in the SEC.

Ole Miss was ranked at No. 84 (out of 590 college and military teams) in the final rankings under the Litkenhous Difference by Score System for 1942.

== Schedule ==
Date	Opponent	Site	Result	Attendance	Source
September 26	Western Kentucky State*	Hemingway Stadium; Oxford, MS	W 39–6	1,500	
October 2	at Georgetown*	Griffith Stadium; Washington, DC	L 6–14	15,000	
October 10	Georgia	Crump Stadium; Memphis, TN	L 13–48	15,000	
October 17	at LSU	Tiger Stadium; Baton Rouge, LA (rivalry)	L 7–21	20,000	
October 24	Arkansas*	Crump Stadium; Memphis, TN (rivalry)	L 6–7	15,000	
October 31	Memphis State*	Hemingway Stadium; Oxford, MS (rivalry)	W 48–0		
November 7	vs. Vanderbilt	Crump Stadium; Memphis, TN (rivalry)	L 0–19	6,000	
November 14	vs. No. 11 Tennessee	Crump Stadium; Memphis, TN (rivalry)	L 0–14		
November 28	at No. 16 Mississippi State	Scott Field; Starkville, MS (Egg Bowl)	L 13–34	16,000	
*Non-conference game; Rankings from Coaches' Poll released prior to the game

== Roster ==
- E Barney Poole
- E Ray Poole
