= 1942 Kentucky Wildcats football team =

American college football season

1942 Kentucky Wildcats football
- Conference: Southeastern Conference
- Record: 3–6–1 (0–5 SEC)
- Head coach: Albert D. Kirwan (5th season)
- Captain: Charles Walker
- Home stadium: McLean Stadium

1942 Southeastern Conference football standings
	Conf.					Overall
Team		W		L			W		L
No. 2 Georgia $	6	–	1	–	0	11	–	1	–	0
No. 5 Georgia Tech	4	–	1	–	0	9	–	2	–	0
No. 7 Tennessee	4	–	1	–	0	9	–	1	–	1
No. 18 Mississippi State	5	–	2	–	0	8	–	2	–	0
No. 10 Alabama	4	–	2	–	0	8	–	3	–	0
LSU	3	–	2	–	0	7	–	3	–	0
No. 16 Auburn	3	–	3	–	0	6	–	4	–	1
Vanderbilt	2	–	4	–	0	6	–	4	–	0
Florida	1	–	3	–	0	3	–	7	–	0
Tulane	1	–	4	–	0	4	–	5	–	0
Kentucky	0	–	5	–	0	3	–	6	–	1
Ole Miss	0	–	5	–	0	2	–	7	–	0
$ – Conference champion; Rankings from AP Poll

The 1942 Kentucky Wildcats football team represented the University of Kentucky in the 1942 college football season. The season opened with a one-point loss to Georgia.

Kentucky was ranked at No. 47 (out of 590 college and military teams) in the final rankings under the Litkenhous Difference by Score System for 1942.

== Schedule ==
Date	Opponent	Site	Result	Attendance	Source
September 19	Georgia	DuPont Stadium; Louisville, KY	L 6–7	10,500	
September 25	at Xavier*	Xavier Stadium; Cincinnati, OH	W 35–19	12,000	
October 3	Washington and Lee*	Stoll Field/McLean Stadium; Lexington, KY	W 53–0		
October 10	Vanderbilt	Stoll Field/McLean Stadium; Lexington, KY	L 6–7		
October 17	at VPI*	Victory Stadium; Roanoke, VA	T 21–21	10,000	
October 24	No. 3 Alabama	Stoll Field/McLean Stadium; Lexington, KY	L 0–14	14,000	
October 30	at George Washington*	Griffith Stadium; Washington, DC	W 27–6	5,000	
November 7	at No. 3 Georgia Tech	Grant Field; Atlanta, GA	L 7–47	20,000	
November 14	West Virginia*	Stoll Field/McLean Stadium; Lexington, KY	L 0–7		
November 21	at Tennessee	Shields–Watkins Field; Knoxville, TN	L 0–26	20,000	
*Non-conference game; Rankings from AP Poll released prior to the game
