= Russ Mosley =

American football player (1918–1997)

Profile
- Position: Halfback

Personal information
- Born: July 22, 1918; Puxico, Missouri, U.S.
- Died: August 2, 1997 (aged 79); Memphis, Tennessee, U.S.
- Listed height: 5 ft 10 in (1.78 m)
- Listed weight: 170 lb (77 kg)

Career information
- College: Alabama

Career history
- Green Bay Packers (1945–1946)

Career statistics
- Games played: 8
- Receiving yards: 10
- Rushing yards: 49
- Interceptions: 2
- Stats at Pro Football Reference

Russ Mosley (July 22, 1918 – August 2, 1997) was an American professional football player in the National Football League (NFL) with the Green Bay Packers. Mosley was born in Puxico, Missouri, on July 22, 1918. He attended the University of Alabama where he played for the Alabama Crimson Tide football as a halfback. At Alabama, Mosley was a triple-threat man, passing, rushing and kicking the ball, while also returning kicks. He played for the Crimson Tide in two bowl games: the 1942 Cotton Bowl Classic and the 1943 Orange Bowl. Before finishing his degree, Mosley entered the United States Army Air Corps during World War II, where he served for over three years. He flew 26 missions in the European Theater, achieving "three battle stars [and] the Air medal with three OakLeaf clusters".

After his military service, Mosley signed with the Green Bay Packers halfway through the 1945 NFL season. He only played in two games during the 1946 NFL season; he only played in eight total games for the Packers, recording 59 total yards on offense and 2 interceptions on defense. During the offseason between 1945 and 1946, he went back to Alabama to continue working on his undergraduate degree in physical education. In 1946, he had a wife and one child; he also owned and flew his own airplane. During his rookie season with the Packers, Mosley piloted the Packers first team flight after World War II for a short duration after take-off and before landing.
