= 1942 Georgia Tech Yellow Jackets football team =

American college football season

1942 Georgia Tech Yellow Jackets football

Cotton Bowl Classic, L 7–14 vs. Texas
- Conference: Southeastern Conference

Ranking
- AP: No. 5
- Record: 9–2 (4–1 SEC)
- Head coach: William Alexander (23rd season)
- Captain: Jack A. Marshall
- Home stadium: Grant Field

1942 Southeastern Conference football standings
	Conf.					Overall
Team		W		L			W		L
No. 2 Georgia $	6	–	1	–	0	11	–	1	–	0
No. 5 Georgia Tech	4	–	1	–	0	9	–	2	–	0
No. 7 Tennessee	4	–	1	–	0	9	–	1	–	1
No. 18 Mississippi State	5	–	2	–	0	8	–	2	–	0
No. 10 Alabama	4	–	2	–	0	8	–	3	–	0
LSU	3	–	2	–	0	7	–	3	–	0
No. 16 Auburn	3	–	3	–	0	6	–	4	–	1
Vanderbilt	2	–	4	–	0	6	–	4	–	0
Florida	1	–	3	–	0	3	–	7	–	0
Tulane	1	–	4	–	0	4	–	5	–	0
Kentucky	0	–	5	–	0	3	–	6	–	1
Ole Miss	0	–	5	–	0	2	–	7	–	0
$ – Conference champion; Rankings from AP Poll

The 1942 Georgia Tech Yellow Jackets football team was an American football team that represented the Georgia Institute of Technology (Georgia Tech) in the Southeastern Conference (SEC) during the 1942 college football season. In their 23rd season under head coach William Alexander, the Yellow Jacket won the first nine games of the season, before losing its final two games, including a loss to Texas in the 1943 Cotton Bowl. They were ranked No. 5 in the AP poll.

== Schedule ==
Date	Opponent	Rank	Site	Result	Attendance	Source
September 26	Auburn		Grant Field; Atlanta, GA (rivalry)	W 15–0	12,000	
October 3	at Notre Dame*		Notre Dame Stadium; South Bend, IN (rivalry)	W 13–6	20,545	
October 10	Chattanooga*		Grant Field; Atlanta, GA	W 30–12	12,000	
October 17	Davidson*	No. 6	Grant Field; Atlanta, GA	W 33–0	10,000	
October 24	at Navy*	No. 6	Thompson Stadium; Annapolis, MD	W 21–0	20,000	
October 31	at Duke*	No. 5	Duke Stadium; Durham, NC	W 26–7	24,000	
November 7	Kentucky	No. 3	Grant Field; Atlanta, GA	W 47–7	20,000	
November 14	No. 5 Alabama	No. 2	Grant Field; Atlanta, GA (rivalry)	W 7–0	34,000	
November 21	Florida	No. 2	Grant Field; Atlanta, GA	W 20–7	15,000	
November 28	at No. 5 Georgia	No. 2	Sanford Stadium; Athens, GA (rivalry)	L 0–34	45,000	
January 1	vs. No. 18 Texas*	No. 5	Cotton Bowl; Dallas, TX (Cotton Bowl Classic)	L 7–14	36,620	
*Non-conference game; Rankings from AP Poll released prior to the game

== Rankings ==
Ranking movements Legend: ██ Increase in ranking ██ Decrease in ranking ( ) = First-place votes
	Week							
Poll	1	2	3	4	5	6	7	Final
AP	6 (5)	6 (1)	5 (3)	3 (3.83)	2 (14)	2 (13)	2 (50)	5
