= 1943 Cotton Bowl Classic =

- 7th Cotton Bowl Classic
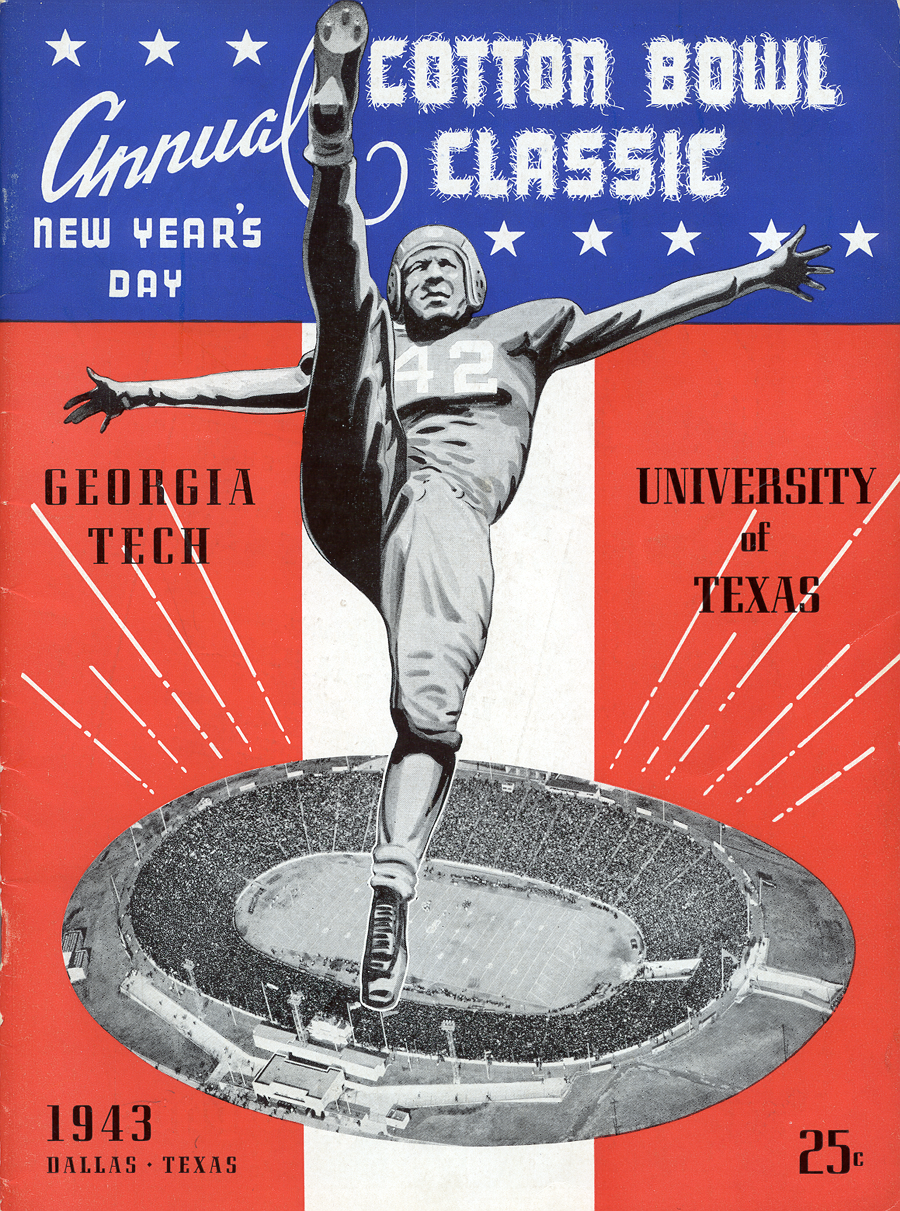
Georgia Tech Yellow Jackets	Texas Longhorns
(9–1)	(8–2)
SEC	SWC
7	14
Head coach: William Alexander	Head coach: Dana X. Bible
AP 5	AP 11
	1	2	3	4	Total
Georgia Tech	0	0	0	7	7
Texas	7	0	7	0	14
- Date: January 1, 1943
- Season: 1942
- Stadium: Cotton Bowl
- Location: Dallas, Texas
- MVP: Guard Jack Freeman (Texas); Back Roy McKay (Texas); Tackle Stanley Mauldin (Texas); Guard Harvey Hardy (GT); End Jack Marshall (GT)
- Attendance: 36,620

The Cotton Bowl in Dallas, Texas, hosted the Cotton Bowl Classic.

The 1943 Cotton Bowl Classic was a college football bowl game played on January 1, 1943 at the Cotton Bowl in Dallas, TX

== Background ==
This was Texas's first bowl game. They were led by Dana X. Bible. This was Georgia Tech's second bowl game of what would be six in the 1940s.

== Game summary ==
Max Minor caught a touchdown pass from Roy McKay and Jackie Field returned a punt 60 yards for a touchdown to give Texas a 14-0 lead into the fourth quarter as Bible replaced his starters.

But Georgia Tech drove 56 yards capped by a David Eldredge touchdown run to narrow the lead. Georgia Tech forced Texas to punt as Tech went on the offensive. They drove all the way to the Texas 5 yard-line, but Texas' defensive line stopped them short as Texas took over at the four. They ran out the clock as Texas won their first bowl game.

== Aftermath ==
Since this game, Texas has been to 22 more Cotton Bowl Classics and have won 11 more times, the most Cotton Bowl victories of any team. Georgia Tech did not return to the Cotton Bowl Classic until 1955.

== Statistics ==
Statistics	Texas	Georgia Tech
First downs	15	10
Yards rushing	201	57
Yards passing	23	138
Total yards	224	195
Punts-Average	7-30.6	8-31.4
Fumbles lost	2	2
Penalties-Yards	2-20	4-20
