= Clyde Johnson =

American football player (1917–1997)

No. 8, 49
- Position: Tackle

Personal information
- Born: August 22, 1917; Ashland, Kentucky, U.S.
- Died: September 14, 1997; Irvine, California, U.S.
- Listed height: 6 ft 6 in (1.98 m)
- Listed weight: 269 lb (122 kg)

Career information
- High school: Ashland
- College: Kentucky (1939–1942)
- NFL draft: 1943: 5th round, 35th overall pick

Career history

Playing
- Los Angeles Rams (1946–1947); Los Angeles Dons (1948)

Coaching
- East Los Angeles (1949–1950) Line coach; East Los Angeles (1951–1961) Head coach

Awards and highlights
- First-team All-American (1942); First-team All-SEC (1942)

Career NFL/AAFC statistics
- Games played: 32
- Games started: 1
- Stats at Pro Football Reference

Head coaching record
- Career: 45–54–4 (.456)

Clyde Elmer Johnson (August 22, 1917 – September 14, 1997) was an American football player and coach. He played college football for the Kentucky Wildcats football team and was selected by the Associated Press as a first-team tackle on the 1942 College Football All-America Team. He was Kentucky's first All-American football player.

At six feet, six inches, and 269 pounds, he was one of the largest football players of his day. He was drafted by the Cleveland Rams in the fifth round with the 35th overall pick in the 1943 NFL draft. His professional debut was delayed during World War II. After the war, he played in the National Football League (NFL) for the Rams in 1946 and 1947 and for the Los Angeles Dons in 1948.

Johnson served as the head football coach at East Los Angeles College from 1951 to 1961. He was the coach at East Los Angeles from 1949 to 1950.

Johnson died in 1997 in Orange County, California, at age 80.

== Head coaching record ==
Year	Team	Overall	Conference	Standing	Bowl/playoffs
East Los Angeles Huskies (Metropolitan Conference) (1951–1961)
1951	East Los Angeles	6–4	5–2	3rd	
1952	East Los Angeles	7–1–2	5–1–1	T–2nd	
1953	East Los Angeles	0–9–1	0–6–1	8th	
1954	East Los Angeles	5–5	4–3	T–3rd	
1955	East Los Angeles	6–3	4–3	4th	
1956	East Los Angeles	5–4	4–3	T–4th	
1957	East Los Angeles	6–3	4–3	4th	
1958	East Los Angeles	3–6	1–6	7th	
1959	East Los Angeles	1–8	0–7	8th	
1960	East Los Angeles	5–4	3–4	5th	
1961	East Los Angeles	1–7–1	1–5–1	7th	
East Los Angeles:		45–54–4	31–43–3		
Total:		45–54–4			
