= George Hecht (American football) =

American football player (1920–1994)

No. 35
- Position: Guard

Personal information
- Born: September 17, 1920; Chicago Heights, Illinois, U.S.
- Died: October 24, 1994 (aged 74); Collinsville, Alabama, U.S.
- Listed height: 6 ft 0 in (1.83 m)
- Listed weight: 235 lb (107 kg)

Career information
- High school: Chicago Heights (IL) Bloom
- College: Alabama
- NFL draft: 1943: 5th round, 33rd overall pick

Career history
- Chicago Rockets (1947)
- Stats at Pro Football Reference

George Hecht (September 17, 1920 – October 24, 1994) was an American football guard. He was drafted by the Chicago Cardinals in the 5th round (33rd overall) of the 1943 NFL Draft. He played in ten games for the Chicago Rockets in 1947.
