= 1942 Florida Gators football team =

American college football season

1942 Florida Gators football
- Conference: Southeastern Conference
- Record: 3–7 (1–3 SEC)
- Head coach: Tom Lieb (3rd season)
- Captains: Bill Corry; O'Neal Hill
- Home stadium: Florida Field

1942 Southeastern Conference football standings
	Conf.					Overall
Team		W		L			W		L
No. 2 Georgia $	6	–	1	–	0	11	–	1	–	0
No. 5 Georgia Tech	4	–	1	–	0	9	–	2	–	0
No. 7 Tennessee	4	–	1	–	0	9	–	1	–	1
No. 18 Mississippi State	5	–	2	–	0	8	–	2	–	0
No. 10 Alabama	4	–	2	–	0	8	–	3	–	0
LSU	3	–	2	–	0	7	–	3	–	0
No. 16 Auburn	3	–	3	–	0	6	–	4	–	1
Vanderbilt	2	–	4	–	0	6	–	4	–	0
Florida	1	–	3	–	0	3	–	7	–	0
Tulane	1	–	4	–	0	4	–	5	–	0
Kentucky	0	–	5	–	0	3	–	6	–	1
Ole Miss	0	–	5	–	0	2	–	7	–	0
$ – Conference champion; Rankings from AP Poll

The 1942 Florida Gators football team represented the University of Florida during the 1942 college football season. The season was Tom Lieb's third as Florida's head coach. By the autumn of 1942, World War II had begun to affect many college football programs. Florida lost several players and most of its coaching staff to the war effort before the season, and lost several more players during the season, leading to diminishing success as the schedule progressed.

The Gators began the season 3–1 but lost their final six contests to finish with a 3–7 overall record. Their 1–3 conference record placed ninth among twelve teams in the SEC.

Florida was ranked at No. 87 (out of 590 college and military teams) in the final rankings under the Litkenhous Difference by Score System for 1942.

== Schedule ==
Date	Opponent	Site	Result	Attendance	Source
September 19	vs. Jacksonville NAS*	Fairfield Stadium; Jacksonville, FL	L 7–20	8,500	
September 26	Randolph–Macon*	Florida Field; Gainesville, FL	W 45–0	3,000	
October 3	at Tampa*	Phillips Field; Tampa, FL	W 26–6	6,500	
October 10	Auburn	Florida Field; Gainesville, FL (rivalry)	W 6–0	10,000	
October 16	at Villanova*	Shibe Park; Philadelphia, PA	L 3–13	8,051	
October 24	No. 16 Mississippi State^{†}	Florida Field; Gainesville, FL	L 12–26	8,000	
October 31	vs. Maryland*	Griffith Stadium; Washington, DC	L 0–13	10,000	
November 7	vs. No. 1 Georgia	Fairfield Stadium; Jacksonville, FL (rivalry)	L 0–75	21,000	
November 14	at Miami (FL)*	Burdine Stadium; Miami, FL (rivalry)	L 0–12	15,558	
November 21	at No. 2 Georgia Tech	Grant Field; Atlanta, GA	L 7–20	15,000	
*Non-conference game; ^{†}Homecoming; Rankings from AP Poll released prior to the game
