= 1943 Sugar Bowl =

American college football game

- 9th Sugar Bowl
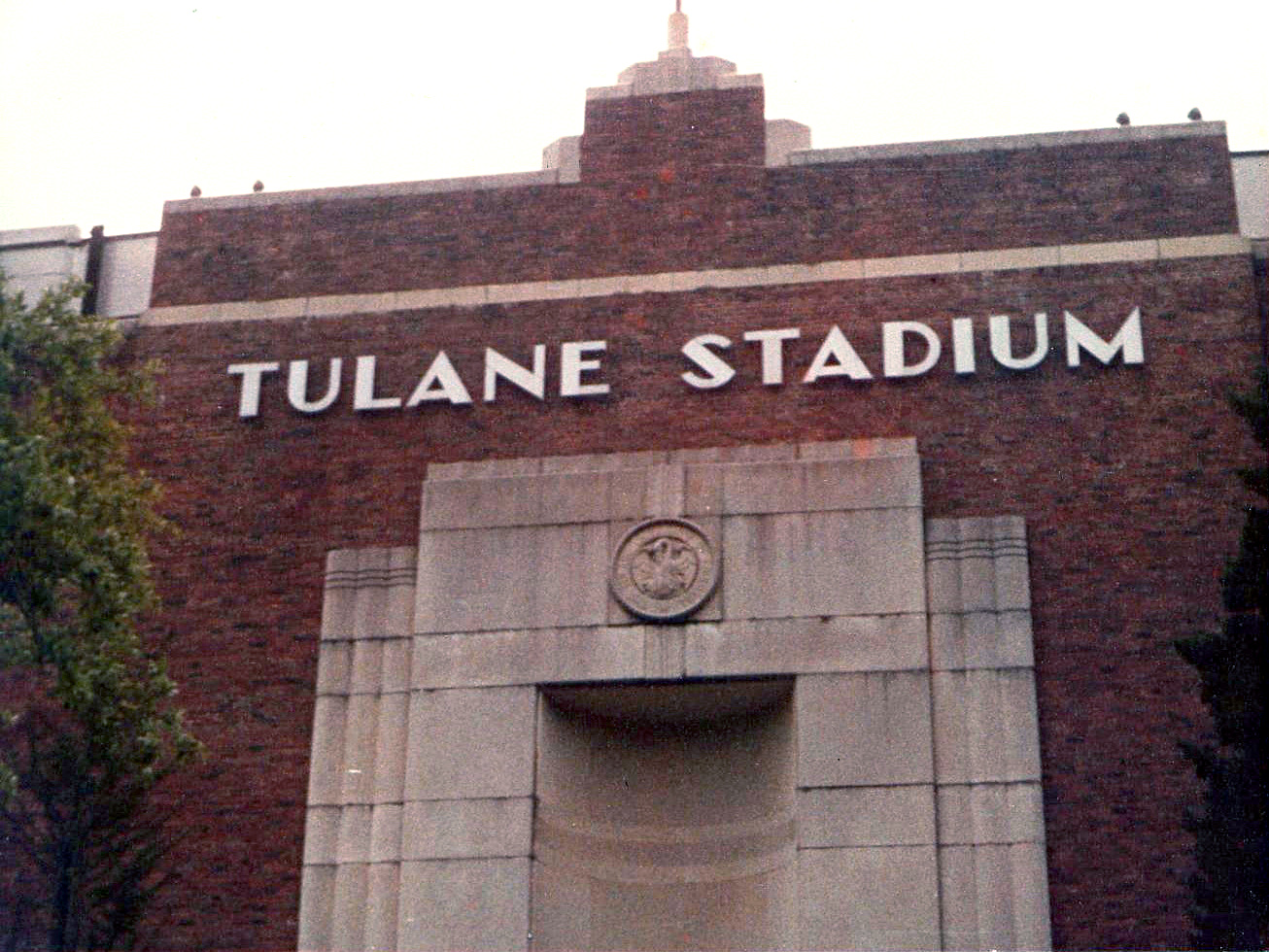
- Tulane Stadium in New Orleans, Louisiana, hosted the Sugar Bowl.
Tennessee Volunteers	Tulsa Golden Hurricane
(8–1–1)	(10–0)
SEC	MVC
14	7
Head coach: John Barnhill	Head coach: Henry Frnka
AP 7	AP 4
	1	2	3	4	Total
Tennessee	0	6	2	6	14
Tulsa	0	7	0	0	7
- Date: January 1, 1943
- Season: 1942
- Stadium: Tulane Stadium
- Location: New Orleans, Louisiana
- Referee: R.A. Carrington
- Attendance: 70,000

The 1943 Sugar Bowl featured the fourth ranked Tulsa, and the seventh ranked Tennessee.

Tulsa took a 7–0 lead on a nine-yard touchdown pass from Glenn Dobbs to Cal Purdin in the second quarter. Tennessee scored on a three-yard run by Gold, but the extra point missed leaving the score 7–6. In the third quarter, Tennessee blocked a Tulsa punt out of the end zone for a safety, giving them an 8–7 advantage. And in the fourth quarter, a one-yard Clyde "IG" Fuson run made the final score 14–7.
