= J. T. "Blondy" Black =

American football player (1920–2000)

J.T. "Blondy" Black
No. 81, 85
- Position: Fullback

Personal information
- Born: August 20, 1920; Philadelphia, Mississippi, U.S.
- Died: May 4, 2000 (aged 79); Madison, Mississippi, U.S.
- Listed height: 5 ft 11 in (1.80 m)
- Listed weight: 195 lb (88 kg)

Career information
- High school: Philadelphia
- College: Mississippi State (1939–1942)
- NFL draft: 1943: 2nd round, 13th overall pick

Career history
- Buffalo Bisons (1946); Baltimore Colts (1947)

Awards and highlights
- Third-team All-American (1942); First-team All-SEC (1942); Mississippi Sports Hall of Fame (1976)

Career AAFC statistics
- Rushing yards: 49
- Rushing average: 8.2
- Receptions: 2
- Receiving yards: 28
- Stats at Pro Football Reference

John Thomas "Blondy" Black (August 20, 1920 – May 4, 2000) was an American professional football player. He played college football for the Mississippi State Bulldogs. He was drafted by the Brooklyn Dodgers baseball team, served in the military, was drafted by the Buffalo Bills but did not play for them during the regular season. In 1947 he played in five games for the Baltimore Colts.

While serving in the military during World War II, Black played professional football under the assumed name of Mike Matiza. In 1946, he played for the Buffalo Bisons, and in 1947 for the Baltimore Colts.

== Early life and education ==
Black was born in Philadelphia, Mississippi. He went to Philadelphia High School. He attended Mississippi State University from 1939 to 1942, where he played football and ran track. He was the offensive cornerstone of MSU's only undefeated football team in 1940. While competing for MSU, he held a school record for running the 100-yard dash in 9.6 seconds in 1941. He averaged 6.1 yards per carry during his varsity football career. Black holds the MSU record for highest yards per rush average in a single game (19.5) and in a season (6.9), both set in 1942. He was a two-time All-SEC selection in 1941 and 1942 and was a UPI All-American in 1943. He also was a three-year letterman in track.

In 1943, Black joined the United States Marine Corps and became a lieutenant. While in the Marines, he played football under the name "Mike Matiza".

== Later career ==
Black later pursued a career as a land developer and car dealership owner in Yazoo City. He was inducted into the Mississippi Sports Hall of Fame in 1976.
