= Monk Gafford =

American football player (1920–1987)

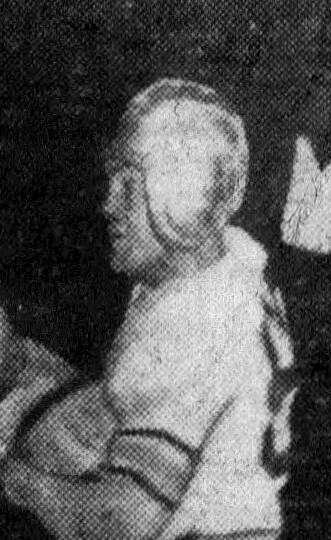
- Gafford in 1947

No. 97, 71, 80
- Position: Halfback

Personal information
- Born: October 1, 1920; Fort Deposit, Alabama, U.S.
- Died: February 19, 1987 (aged 66); Montgomery, Alabama, U.S.
- Listed height: 5 ft 11 in (1.80 m)
- Listed weight: 195 lb (88 kg)

Career information
- High school: Fort Deposit
- College: Auburn (1939–1942)
- NFL draft: 1943: 3rd round, 17th overall pick

Career history
- Miami Seahawks (1946); Brooklyn Dodgers (1946–1948)

Awards and highlights
- First-team All-American (1942); First-team All-SEC (1942)

Career AAFC statistics
- Rushing yards: 349
- Rushing average: 3.5
- Receptions: 37
- Receiving yards: 657
- Total touchdowns: 11
- Stats at Pro Football Reference

Roy Haynes "Monk" Gafford, Jr. (October 1, 1920 – February 19, 1987) was an American football player. He played college football for the Auburn Tigers football team and gained 1,004 yards rushing in 1942 with an average of 7.6 yards per carry. He was selected by the International News Service as a first-team halfback on the 1942 College Football All-America Team. He was selected by the Steagles in the third round with the 17th pick in the 1943 NFL draft. However, his professional football career was delayed due to military service during World War II. After the war, Gafford played three seasons in the AAFC with the Miami Seahawks in 1946 and the Brooklyn Dodgers in the 1946, 1947 and 1948 seasons. He was the president of a steel plant in Tulsa, Oklahoma, for 28 years. He returned to Alabama in his retirement and died of cancer in 1987 at age 66.
