= 1942 Georgia Bulldogs football team =

American college football season

1942 Georgia Bulldogs football

National champion (various selectors) SEC champion Rose Bowl champion

Rose Bowl, W 9–0 vs. UCLA
- Conference: Southeastern Conference

Ranking
- AP: No. 2
- Record: 11–1 (6–1 SEC)
- Head coach: Wally Butts (4th season)
- Captain: Frank Sinkwich
- Home stadium: Sanford Stadium

1942 Southeastern Conference football standings
	Conf.					Overall
Team		W		L			W		L
No. 2 Georgia $	6	–	1	–	0	11	–	1	–	0
No. 5 Georgia Tech	4	–	1	–	0	9	–	2	–	0
No. 7 Tennessee	4	–	1	–	0	9	–	1	–	1
No. 18 Mississippi State	5	–	2	–	0	8	–	2	–	0
No. 10 Alabama	4	–	2	–	0	8	–	3	–	0
LSU	3	–	2	–	0	7	–	3	–	0
No. 16 Auburn	3	–	3	–	0	6	–	4	–	1
Vanderbilt	2	–	4	–	0	6	–	4	–	0
Florida	1	–	3	–	0	3	–	7	–	0
Tulane	1	–	4	–	0	4	–	5	–	0
Kentucky	0	–	5	–	0	3	–	6	–	1
Ole Miss	0	–	5	–	0	2	–	7	–	0
$ – Conference champion; Rankings from AP Poll

The 1942 Georgia Bulldogs football team was an American football team that represented the University of Georgia in the Southeastern Conference (SEC) during the 1942 college football season. In their fourth season under head coach Wally Butts, the Bulldogs compiled an 11–1 record, shut out six of twelve opponents (including a 34–0 victory over No. 2 Georgia Tech), won the SEC championship, and outscored all opponents by a total of 378 to 73. The Bulldogs' 75–0 win over Florida remains the largest margin of victory in the history of the Florida–Georgia football rivalry.

In the final AP Poll released on November 30, 1942, Georgia was ranked No. 2 with 1,339 points, less than 100 points behind No. 1 Ohio State. After the final AP Poll, the Bulldogs defeated No. 13 UCLA in the 1943 Rose Bowl. Ohio State did not play in a bowl game. In this time period, the AP did not conduct polling after the bowl games. However, at the time and in later decades, Georgia was selected as the 1942 national champion by the majority of math systems, including Berryman (QPRS), DeVold System, Houlgate System, Litkenhous, Poling System, Sagarin Ratings, and Williamson System. Georgia retroactively claimed the title in the late 1980s, after then-head coach and athletic director Vince Dooley noticed that the team was listed as a national champion selection in an NCAA record book.

At the end of the 1942 season, Georgia halfback Frank Sinkwich won the Heisman Trophy. He was also selected as SEC Player of the Year, Associated Press Athlete of the Year, and a consensus first-team pick on the 1942 All-America college football team. Several Georgia players also received first-team honors from the Associated Press (AP) and/or United Press (UP) on the 1942 All-SEC football team: Sinkwich (AP-1, UP-1); end George Poschner (AP-1, UP-1); and guard Walter Ruark (AP-1, UP-2).

== Schedule ==
Date	Opponent	Rank	Site	Result	Attendance	Source
September 19	at Kentucky		DuPont Stadium; Louisville, KY	W 7–6	10,500	
September 25	vs. Jacksonville NAS*		Municipal Stadium; Macon, GA	W 14–0	11,000	
October 3	Furman*		Sanford Stadium; Athens, GA	W 40–7	8,000	
October 10	at Ole Miss		Crump Stadium; Memphis, TN	W 48–13	15,000	
October 17	Tulane	No. 2	Sanford Stadium; Athens, GA	W 40–0	18,000	
October 24	at Cincinnati*	No. 2	Nippert Stadium; Cincinnati, OH	W 35–13	15,000	
October 31	vs. No. 3 Alabama	No. 2	Grant Field; Atlanta, GA (rivalry)	W 21–10	32,000–33,000	
November 7	vs. Florida	No. 1	Fairfield Stadium; Jacksonville, FL (rivalry)	W 75–0	21,000	
November 14	at Chattanooga*	No. 1	Chamberlain Field; Chattanooga, TN	W 40–0	5,500	
November 21	vs. Auburn	No. 1	Memorial Stadium; Columbus, GA (rivalry)	L 13–27	22,000	
November 28	No. 2 Georgia Tech^{†}	No. 5	Sanford Stadium; Athens, GA (rivalry)	W 34–0	45,000	
January 1, 1943	vs. No. 13 UCLA*	No. 2	Rose Bowl; Pasadena, CA (Rose Bowl)	W 9–0	90,000	
*Non-conference game; ^{†}Homecoming; Rankings from AP Poll released prior to the game

== Rankings ==
Ranking movements Legend: ██ Increase in ranking ██ Decrease in ranking ( ) = First-place votes
	Week							
Poll	1	2	3	4	5	6	7	Final
AP	1 (25)	2 (38)	2 (25)	1 (84.31)	1 (85)	1 (69)	5 (1)	2 (62)
