= Harvey Hardy =

American football player (1922–1992)

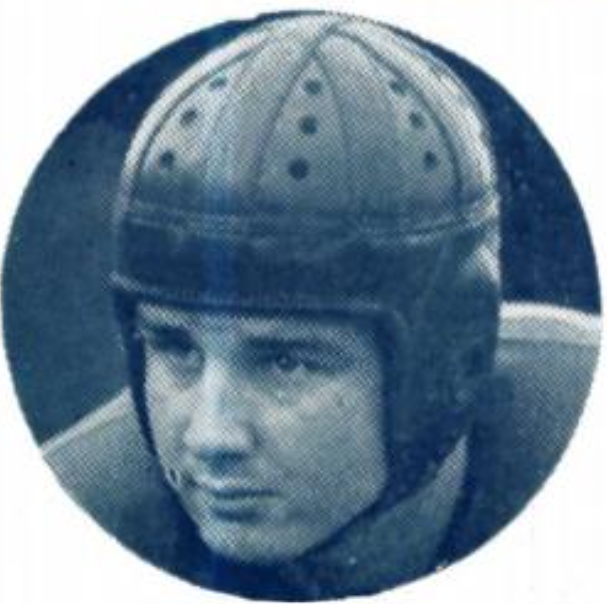
- Hardy, c. 1942

Profile
- Position: Guard

Personal information
- Born: November 27, 1922; Thomaston, Georgia, U.S.
- Died: September 15, 1992 (aged 69); Lakeland, Florida, U.S.
- Listed height: 5 ft 11 in (1.80 m)
- Listed weight: 185 lb (84 kg)

Career information
- College: Georgia Tech
- NFL draft: 1943: 26th round, 243rd overall pick

Career history
- Brooklyn Dodgers (1943)*
- * Offseason or practice squad member only

Awards and highlights
- Consensus All-American (1942); First-team All-SEC (1942)

Harvey Boland Hardy (November 27, 1922 – September 15, 1992) was an American football player who played collegiately for the Georgia Tech football team, was a consensus All-American, and was an MVP of the 1943 Cotton Bowl Classic.

Hardy was selected as the 243rd pick of the 1943 NFL draft (round 26, pick 3) by the Brooklyn Dodgers but did not play professionally. He was inducted into the Georgia Tech Hall of Fame in 1961. He was elected to the Alabama Community College Conference Hall of Fame in 1990.

Hardy was in the Southeastern Conference Football Officials Association from 1957 to 1981, and officiated 23 bowl games.
