= Tony Leon (American football) =

American football player (1917–2002)

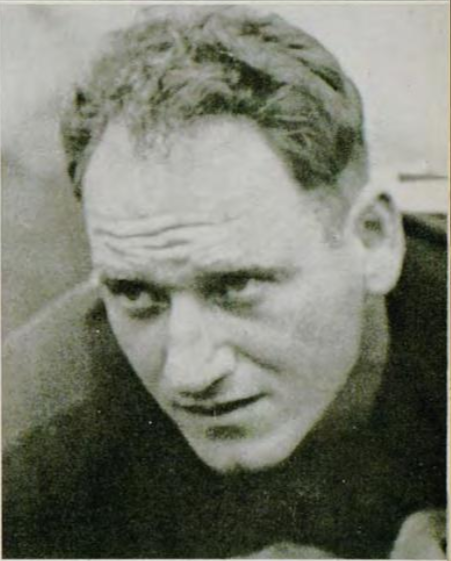
- Leon, c. 1942

No. 48, 17, 34
- Positions: Guard, linebacker

Personal information
- Born: February 18, 1917; Follansbee, West Virginia, U.S.
- Died: July 19, 2002 (aged 85); Boulder City, Nevada, U.S.
- Listed height: 5 ft 9 in (1.75 m)
- Listed weight: 203 lb (92 kg)

Career information
- High school: Weir (Weirton, West Virginia)
- College: Alabama (1939–1942)
- NFL draft: 1943: 8th round, 70th overall pick

Career history
- Washington Redskins (1943); Brooklyn Tigers (1944); Boston Yanks (1945–1946)

Career NFL statistics
- Games played: 36
- Interceptions: 1
- Fumble recoveries: 1
- Stats at Pro Football Reference

Anthony David Leon (February 18, 1917 in Follansbee, West Virginia – July 19, 2002) was a professional American football offensive lineman in the National Football League (NFL) for the Washington Redskins, the Brooklyn Tigers, and the Boston Yanks.

He played college football at the University of Alabama and was drafted 70th overall in the eighth round of the 1943 NFL draft.
