= George Weeks (American football) =

American football player (1918–1980)

No. 18
- Position: Defensive end

Personal information
- Born: December 16, 1918; Dothan, Alabama, U.S.
- Died: March 1980 (aged 61); Florence, Alabama, U.S.
- Listed height: 6 ft 2 in (1.88 m)
- Listed weight: 195 lb (88 kg)

Career information
- High school: Dothan
- College: Alabama
- NFL draft: 1943: 14th round, 122nd overall pick

Career history
- Brooklyn Tigers (1944)
- Stats at Pro Football Reference

George Ellison Weeks (December 16, 1918 – March 1980) was an American football defensive end who played for one season in the National Football League (NFL). After playing college football for Alabama, he was drafted by the Philadelphia Eagles in the 14th round of the 1943 NFL draft. He played for the Brooklyn Tigers in 1944.

During World War II, Weeks served as Athletic Officer for Camp Kilmer in New Jersey for almost two years, where he was head coach and director of athletics for over 2,000 soldiers. It was during this time that he played for the Brooklyn Tigers. After the war he coached for a time at Clay County High School in Alabama. Weeks got into coaching at the college level in 1948. He served as Jacksonville State University's end coach in 1948, where the Gamecocks won the Paper Bowl. In the spring of 1949, he was Jacksonville State's first-ever men's golf head coach for the newly-developed program. Weeks spent just one academic year there before moving on to the University of North Alabama, where he would become an assistant football coach and head baseball coach. He remained the head baseball coach for 22 seasons.
