= Russ Craft =

American football player (1919–2009)

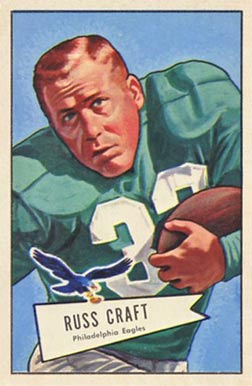
- Craft on a 1952 Bowman football card

No. 33, 24
- Positions: Defensive back; Halfback

Personal information
- Born: October 15, 1919; McEwen, Tennessee, U.S.
- Died: January 12, 2009 (aged 89); Wellsburg, West Virginia, U.S.
- Listed height: 5 ft 9 in (1.75 m)
- Listed weight: 178 lb (81 kg)

Career information
- College: Alabama (1939-1942)
- NFL draft: 1943: 15th round, 132nd overall pick

Career history

Playing
- Philadelphia Eagles (1946–1953); Pittsburgh Steelers (1954)

Coaching
- Pittsburgh Steelers (1956) Defensive backs coach

Awards and highlights
- 2× NFL champion (1948, 1949); 2× Pro Bowl (1951, 1952); Second-team All-SEC (1942)

Career NFL statistics
- Rushing yards: 231
- Rushing average: 3.6
- Receptions: 12
- Receiving yards: 303
- Interceptions: 22
- Fumble recoveries: 15
- Total touchdowns: 7
- Stats at Pro Football Reference

William Russell Craft (October 15, 1919 – January 12, 2009) was an American professional football player who was a defensive back in the National Football League (NFL) for the Philadelphia Eagles and the Pittsburgh Steelers. He played college football for the Alabama Crimson Tide and was selected 132nd overall in the 15th round of the 1943 NFL draft. In 1948, Craft was a key member of the Eagles in what became known as the Blizzard Bowl, in which the Eagles’ defense overwhelmed the Cardinals on the way to a 7–0 victory that earned Philadelphia its first N.F.L. championship. In 1949, he was a notable player in helping the Eagles win a second World Championship, a 1947 Division Championship, and was selected to the Pro Bowl twice, in 1951 and 1952.

Craft had some other notable achievements. In 1950, against the Chicago Cardinals, the Eagles' defense recorded eight interceptions, including an NFL-record-tying four by Craft. Craft had 22 career interceptions. Then in 1952, while playing against the Pittsburgh Steelers, Craft was able to block three Extra points (PATs).

Craft was also a defensive coach for the Steelers.

After football, Craft served as the sheriff of Brooke County, West Virginia from 1969 to 1972.
