= Frank Thomas (American football) =

American football player and coach (1898–1954)

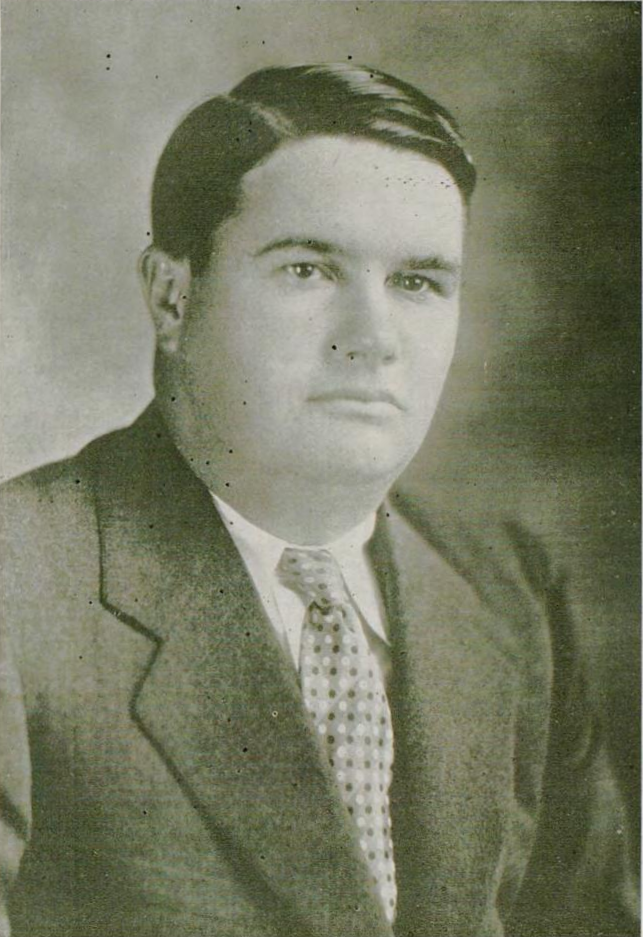
- Thomas, c. 1938

Biographical details
- Born: November 15, 1898; Muncie, Indiana, U.S.
- Died: May 10, 1954 (aged 55); Tuscaloosa, Alabama, U.S.

Playing career
- 1917–1918: Western State Normal
- 1920–1922: Notre Dame
- Position: Quarterback

Coaching career (HC unless noted)
- 1923–1924: Georgia (assistant)
- 1925–1928: Chattanooga
- 1929–1930: Georgia (backfield)
- 1931–1946: Alabama

Administrative career (AD unless noted)
- 1940–1952: Alabama

Head coaching record
- Overall: 141–33–9
- Bowls: 4–2

Accomplishments and honors

Championships
- 2 national (1934, 1941); 3 SIAA (1926–1928); 4 SEC (1933–1934, 1937, 1945)

Awards
- SEC Coach of the Year (1945)
- College Football Hall of Fame; Inducted in 1951 (profile)

Frank William Thomas (November 15, 1898 – May 10, 1954) was an American football player and coach. He served as the head football coach at the University of Chattanooga from 1925 to 1928 and at the University of Alabama from 1931 to 1946, compiling a career college football record of 141–33–9. During his tenure at Alabama, Thomas amassed a record of 115–24–7 and won four Southeastern Conference titles while his teams allowed an average of just 6.3 points per game. Thomas's 1934 Alabama team completed a 10–0 season with a victory over Stanford in the Rose Bowl and was named national champion by a number of selectors.

Thomas's total wins and winning percentage at Alabama rank third all-time among Crimson Tide football coaches, behind only Nick Saban and Paul "Bear" Bryant, whom Thomas coached in the mid-1930s. Thomas never coached a losing season, and twice his teams had undefeated, 10-win campaigns. Thomas was inducted into the College Football Hall of Fame in 1951.

== Early life ==
Thomas was born in Muncie, Indiana. His parents, James and Elizabeth Williams Thomas, were recent immigrants from Cardiff, Wales. He was a star athlete in high school.

== College athletics ==
After spending two years at Western State Normal School (now known as Western Michigan University), Thomas transferred to Notre Dame and played quarterback for coach Knute Rockne from 1920 to 1922. According to Rockne, Thomas was the smartest player he ever coached. Thomas's roommate and best friend at Notre Dame was George "The Gipper" Gipp.

== Career ==
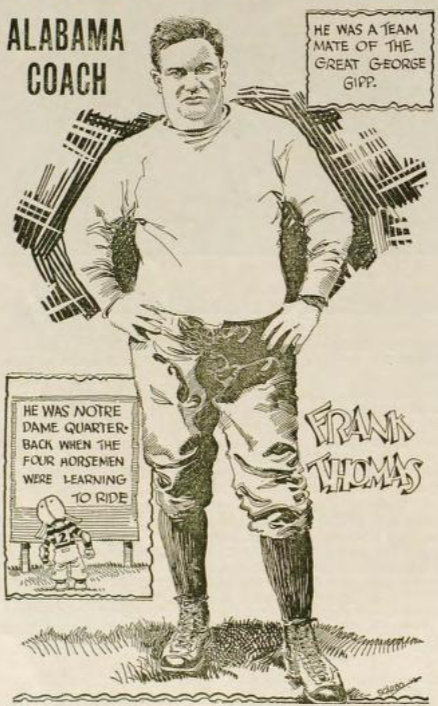
A 1934 cartoon of Thomas

After graduating from Notre Dame, Thomas became an assistant coach at the University of Georgia for two years before earning his first head coaching job in 1925 at the University of Chattanooga, where his teams' record was 26–9–2 in four seasons. In 1931, he accepted the head coaching job at the University of Alabama, where he established himself as one of the top coaches in the nation. His bowl record at Alabama was 4–2, with wins at the Rose Bowl (1935, 1946), Cotton Bowl Classic (1942), and Orange Bowl (1943). He became the coach and mentor to future Hall of Fame coach Paul "Bear" Bryant. Other notable players included Don Hutson, Vaughn Mancha, Harry Gilmer, Johnny Cain, and Riley Smith.

A frequent smoker, Thomas commonly smoked cigars on the sidelines during games. Thomas fell ill with heart and lung disease. Too weak to both coach and take care of his mentally ill daughter, his declining health finally forced his resignation from coaching in 1946. He remained Alabama's athletic director.

== Death and legacy ==
In 1951, he was inducted into the College Football Hall of Fame. Thomas died in 1954 at the age of 55 at Druid City Hospital in Tuscaloosa, Alabama. An illustrated book published later that year told his story. The football practice fields at the University of Alabama are named for Thomas and his successor, Harold Drew.

In 2006, a bronze statue of Thomas was erected outside of the University of Alabama's Bryant–Denny Stadium alongside the statues of Wallace Wade, Bear Bryant, Gene Stallings and now Nick Saban, the other head coaches who have led Alabama to national championships.

== Head coaching record ==
Year	Team	Overall	Conference	Standing	Bowl/playoffs	AP^{#}
Chattanooga Moccasins (Southern Intercollegiate Athletic Association) (1925–1928)
1925	Chattanooga	4–4	2–3	12th		
1926	Chattanooga	6–2–2	4–0–2	T–1st		
1927	Chattanooga	8–1	5–0	T–1st		
1928	Chattanooga	8–2	8–1	1st		
Chattanooga:		26–9–2	19–4–2			
Alabama Crimson Tide (Southern Conference) (1931–1932)
1931	Alabama	9–1	7–1	3rd		
1932	Alabama	8–2	5–2	T–5th		
Alabama Crimson Tide (Southeastern Conference) (1933–1946)
1933	Alabama	7–1–1	5–0–1	1st		
1934	Alabama	10–0	7–0	T–1st	W Rose	
1935	Alabama	6–2–1	4–2	5th		
1936	Alabama	8–0–1	5–0–1	2nd		4
1937	Alabama	9–1	6–0	1st	L Rose	4
1938	Alabama	7–1–1	4–1–1	T–2nd		13
1939	Alabama	5–3–1	2–3–1	8th		
1940	Alabama	7–2	4–2	4th		
1941	Alabama	9–2	5–2	3rd	W Cotton	20
1942	Alabama	8–3	4–2	5th	W Orange	10
1943	No team—World War II					
1944	Alabama	5–2–2	3–1–2	T–3rd	L Sugar	
1945	Alabama	10–0	6–0	1st	W Rose	3
1946	Alabama	7–4	4–3	6th		
Alabama:		115–24–7	71–19–6			
Total:		141–33–9				
National championship Conference title Conference division title or championship game berth
^{#}Rankings from final AP Poll.

== Sources ==
- Stone, Naylor (1954) Coach Tommy of the Crimson Tide. Birmingham, Alabama: Vulcan Press.
- Groom, Winston. The Crimson Tide - An Illustrated History. Tuscaloosa: The University of Alabama Press, 2000. ISBN 0-8173-1051-7
- Bowling, Lewis. "EOA Links." Encyclopedia of Alabama: Frank Thomas. N.p., 26 Feb. 2009. Web.
