= 1942 All-SEC football team =

American college football all-star team

The 1942 All-SEC football team consists of American football players selected to the All-Southeastern Conference (SEC) chosen by various selectors for the 1942 college football season. Georgia won the conference. Frank Sinkwich won the Heisman Trophy.

== All-SEC selections ==
=== Ends ===
- George Poschner, Georgia (AP-1, UP-1)
- Al Hust, Tennessee (AP-1, UP-2)
- Marty Comer, Tulane (AP-2, UP-1)
- Robert Patterson, Miss. St. (AP-2)
- V. Davis, Georgia (UP-2)
- Sam Sharp, Alabama (AP-3)
- Jack Marshall, Georgia Tech (AP-3)

=== Tackles ===
- Don Whitmire, Alabama (College Football Hall of Fame) (AP-1, UP-1)
- Clyde Johnson, Kentucky (AP-1, UP-1)
- Mitchell Olenski, Alabama (AP-2, UP-2)
- Denver Crawford, Tennessee (AP-2)
- J. H. McClurkin, Auburn (UP-2)
- Gene Ellenson, Georgia (AP-3)
- Richard Huffman, Tennessee (AP-3)

=== Guards ===
- Harvey Hardy, Georgia Tech (AP-1, UP-1)
- Walter Ruark, Georgia (AP-1, UP-2)
- George Hecht, Alabama (AP-2, UP-1)
- Oscar Britt, Ole Miss (AP-3, UP-2)
- Raymond Ray, Miss. St. (AP-2)
- Curtis Patterson, Miss. St. (AP-3)

=== Centers ===
- Joe Domnanovich, Alabama (AP-1, UP-1)
- George Manning, Georgia Tech (AP-2, UP-2)
- Jim Talley, LSU (AP-3)

=== Quarterbacks ===
- Clint Castleberry, Georgia Tech (AP-1, UP-1)
- Jack Jenkins, Vanderbilt (AP-1, UP-2)

=== Halfbacks ===
- Monk Gafford, Auburn (AP-1, UP-1)
- J. T. "Blondy" Black, Miss. St. (UP-1)
- Bob Cifers, Tennessee (AP-2, UP-2)
- Russ Craft, Alabama (AP-2, UP-2)
- Walter McDonald, Tulane (AP-2)
- John Black, Miss. St. (AP-2)
- Lou Thomas, Tulane (AP-3)
- Lamar Davis, Georgia (AP-3)
- Bernie Rohling, Vanderbilt (AP-3)

=== Fullbacks ===
- Frank Sinkwich, Georgia (College Football Hall of Fame) (AP-1, UP-1)
- Alvin Dark, LSU (AP-3, UP-2)

== Key ==
AP = Associated Press

UP = United Press.

Bold = Consensus first-team selection by both AP and UP

== See also ==
- 1942 College Football All-America Team
