= George Poschner =

American football player (1919–2004)

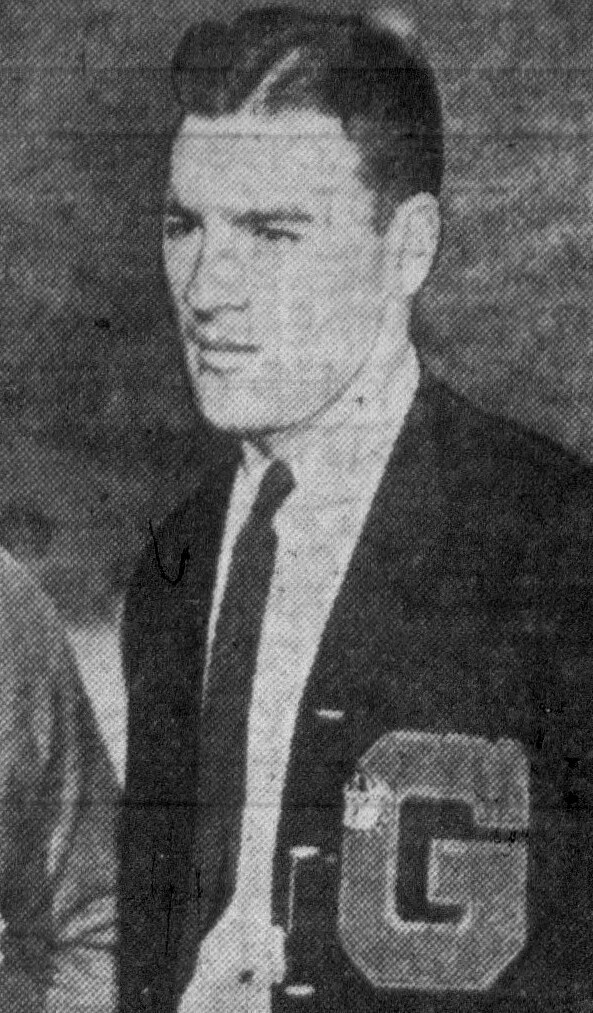
- Poschner, circa 1942

Georgia Bulldogs
- Position: End

Personal information
- Born: January 15, 1919; Youngstown, Ohio, U.S.
- Died: May 2, 2004 (aged 85)

Career information
- College: Georgia (1939–1942)

Awards and highlights
- National champion (1942); Second-team All-American (1942); First-team All-SEC (1942)

George Poschner (January 15, 1919 – May 2, 2004) was an American football end who played for the University of Georgia from 1939 to 1942. During his tenure with the Bulldogs, he participated in the 1942 Orange Bowl and the 1943 Rose Bowl.

== College football career ==
Poschner was born in Youngstown, Ohio, and came to the University of Georgia as a result of the efforts of his good friend, Frank Sinkwich. When Sinkwich was recruited by Georgia, he accepted the scholarship on the condition that Poschner would be granted a scholarship as well. Poschner earned All-America honors in 1942, and was selected 61st overall in the eighth round of the 1943 NFL draft by the Detroit Lions. The most celebrated event in Poschner's collegiate career came when he caught two fourth-quarter passes from Sinkwich in a 21–10 win over Alabama in 1942.

== Military service ==
Poschner served in the United States Army in World War II, where he received the Purple Heart, Bronze Star and Distinguished Service Cross. On January 8, 1945, Poschner participated as a lieutenant in the Battle of the Bulge. While advancing into enemy territory, he was severely injured by machine-gun fire and did not receive medical treatment until two days later. Poschner lost both legs and several fingers as a result of his injuries. A New York Times report on Poschner's injuries observed, "His brilliant pass receiving added much to the reputation of All-America Frank Sinkwich, also of Youngstown, as a forward passer". The news report added that "Poschner's mother advised Coach Wally Butts of her son's case".

== Legacy ==
Poschner was admired as much for his military valor and buoyant optimism as he was for his impressive achievements on the gridiron. In 1982, his former teammate, Frank Sinkwich, lauded him at a testimonial dinner held at Youngstown's Croatian Home. "Knowing George has made me stronger all my life", Sinkwich said.

In his letter nominating Poschner to the Georgia Sports Hall of Fame, Sinkwich wrote: "In my opinion, George Poschner is perhaps the greatest competitor of all time, both on and off the field. I have never known anyone with more courage on the football or the battlefield". Poschner was inducted into the Georgia Sports Hall of Fame in 1982, and the Orange Bowl Hall of Honor in 1985.

== See also ==
- List of NCAA major college football yearly receiving leaders
