= Joe Domnanovich =

American football player (1919–2009)

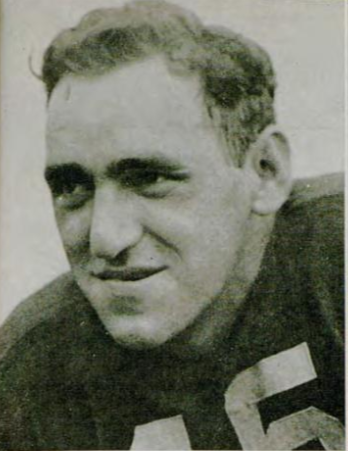
- Domnanovich with the Crimson Tide, c. 1942

No. 32, 34
- Positions: Center, linebacker

Personal information
- Born: March 21, 1919; South Bend, Indiana, U.S.
- Died: January 20, 2009 (aged 89); Birmingham, Alabama, U.S.
- Listed height: 6 ft 0 in (1.83 m)
- Listed weight: 213 lb (97 kg)

Career information
- High school: Riley (South Bend)
- College: Alabama
- NFL draft: 1943: 4th round, 28th overall pick

Career history

Playing
- Boston Yanks (1946–1948); New York Bulldogs/Yanks (1949–1951)

Coaching
- Fort McClellan (1945) Line coach

Awards and highlights
- Consensus All-American (1942); First-team All-SEC (1942); Alabama Football Hall of Fame (1984); Indiana Football Hall of Fame (1989)

Career NFL statistics
- Games played: 67
- Games started: 39
- Interceptions: 3
- Fumble recoveries: 8
- Stats at Pro Football Reference

Joseph John Domnanovich (March 21, 1919 – January 20, 2009) was an American professional football player who was a center for six seasons in the National Football League (NFL) for the Boston Yanks (1946–1948) and the New York Bulldogs/Yanks (1949–1951). Prior to his professional career, Domanovich played college football for the Alabama Crimson Tide under Coach Frank Thomas from 1938 to 1942.

Domnanovich played both linebacker and center and became an All-American center at the University of Alabama. He was voted to the All-time Alabama team for the first 50 years (1892–1942) in 1943. Between college and his pro career he served in the Third United States Army European Theater Special Services, from 1943 to 1946. He coached the line and played center for the 1945 Fort McClellan Riflemen football team.

Domnanovich was inducted into the Alabama Football Hall of Fame in 1984 and the Indiana Football Hall of Fame in 1989. He died on January 20, 2009, in Birmingham, Alabama, where he had resided for his adult life. His interment was located in Birmingham's Elmwood Cemetery. Domnanovich was of Croatian descent and both of his parents were born in Austria.
