= List of Virginia Tech Hokies starting quarterbacks =

College football list

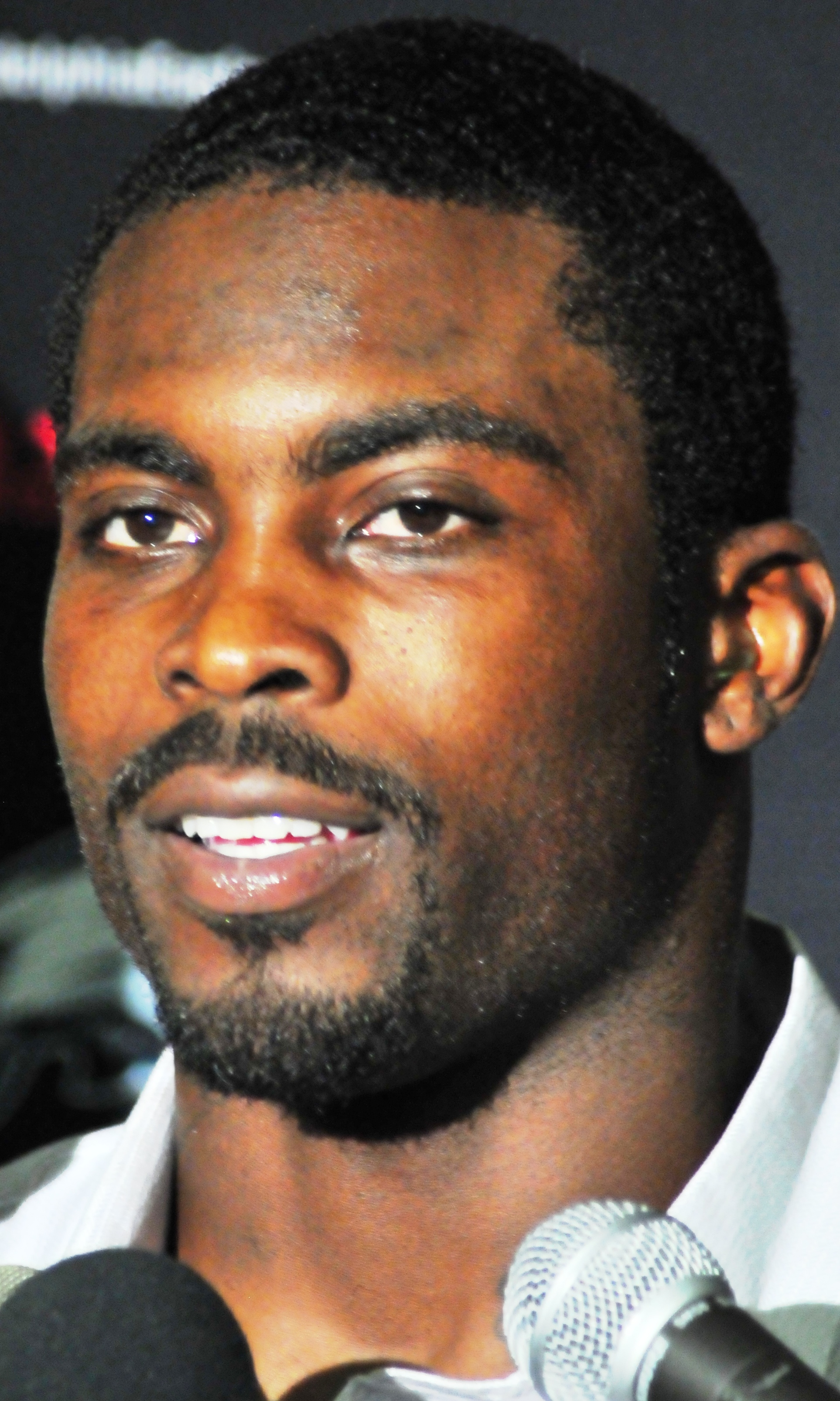
Virginia Tech quarterback Michael Vick was the first overall selection in the 2001 NFL draft.

This is a list of American football quarterbacks who have started for the Virginia Tech Hokies football team and the years they participated on the Virginia Tech Hokies football team.

Six Virginia Tech quarterbacks have been taken in the National Football League draft since 1936. Michael Vick was the first overall selection in the 2001 NFL draft. Besides the NFL, Virginia Tech quarterbacks have also played professionally in the Arena Football League, Canadian Football League, XFL, Indoor Football League, Southern Indoor Football League, and Lone Star Football League.

Three former Virginia Tech quarterbacks went on to be head coaches in Division I-A or professional football. Bruce Arians is the former head coach of the Tampa Bay Buccaneers of the National Football League.

== Key ==
| (#) | Games started |

*Note: Under NCAA Rules, Virginia Tech does not count statistics from bowl games in the team or individual statistical totals for games prior to the 2002 season.

== Starting quarterbacks ==
These quarterbacks have started college football games for the Virginia Tech Hokies. They are listed in order of the date of each player's first start at quarterback for the Hokies.

| Season(s) | Quarterback(s) |
|---|---|
| 2026 | Ethan Grunkemeyer (1) |
| 2025 | Kyron Drones (11) |
| 2024 | Kyron Drones (9) / Collin Schlee (2) / Willam "Pop" Watson III (1) |
| 2023 | Grant Wells (2) / Kyron Drones (11) |
| 2022 | Grant Wells (11) |
| 2021 | Braxton Burmeister (12) / Connor Blumrick (1) |
| 2020 | Braxton Burmeister (5) / Hendon Hooker (6) |
| 2019 | Ryan Willis (4) / Hendon Hooker (8) / Quincy Patterson (1) |
| 2018 | Josh Jackson (3) / Ryan Willis (10) |
| 2017 | Josh Jackson (13) |
| 2016 | Jerod Evans (14) |
| 2015 | Michael Brewer (7) / Brenden Motley (6) |
| 2014 | Michael Brewer (13) |
| 2013 | Logan Thomas (13) |
| 2012 | Logan Thomas (13) |
| 2011 | Logan Thomas (14) |
| 2010 | Tyrod Taylor (14) |
| 2009 | Tyrod Taylor (13) |
| 2008 | Sean Glennon (4) / Tyrod Taylor (10) |
| 2007 | Sean Glennon (9) / Tyrod Taylor (5) |
| 2006 | Sean Glennon (13) |
| 2005 | Marcus Vick (13) |
| 2004 | Bryan Randall (13) |
| 2003 | Bryan Randall (13) |
| 2002 | Grant Noel (2) / Bryan Randall (12) |
| 2001 | Grant Noel (11) |
| 2000 | Michael Vick (9) / Dave Meyer (2) |
| 1999 | Michael Vick (10) / Dave Meyer (1) |
| 1998 | Al Clark (7) / Dave Meyer (1) / Nick Sorensen (3) |
| 1997 | Al Clark (10) / Nick Sorensen (1) |
| 1996 | Jim Druckenmiller (11) |
| 1995 | Jim Druckenmiller (11) |
| 1994 | Maurice DeShazo (11) |
| 1993 | Maurice DeShazo (11) |
| 1992 | Maurice DeShazo (10) / Treg Koel (1) |
| 1991 | Will Furrer (9) / Rodd Wooten (2) |
| 1990 | Will Furrer (10) / Rodd Wooten (1) |
| 1989 | Will Furrer (4) / Cam Young (5) / Rodd Wooten (1) |
| 1988 | Will Furrer (10) / Cam Young (1) |
| 1987 | Erik Chapman (11) |
| 1986 | Erik Chapman (11) |
| 1985 | Mark Cox (4) / Todd Greenwood (7) |
| 1984 | Mark Cox / Todd Greenwood |
| 1983 | Mark Cox (11) |
| 1982 | Todd Greenwood (8) / Mark Cox (3) |
| 1981 | Steve Casey (10) / Jeff Bolton (1) |
| 1980 | Steve Casey (12) |
| 1979 | Steve Casey (11) |
| 1978 | Steve Casey / David Lamie |
| 1977 | David Lamie (11) |
| 1976 | Mitcheal Barnes (11) |
| 1975 | Phil Rogers (11) |
| 1974 | Bruce Arians (11) |
| 1973 | Rick Popp / Eddie Joyce |
| 1972 | Don Strock (11) |
| 1971 | Don Strock (11) |
| 1970 | Gil Schwabe |
| 1969 | Bob German / Al Kincaid |
| 1968 | Al Kincaid (11) |
| 1967 | Al Kincaid (10) |
| 1966 | Tommy Stafford (11) |
| 1965 | Bobby Owens (10) |
| 1964 | Bob Schweickert (10) |
| 1963 | Bob Schweickert (10) |
| 1962 | Pete Cartwright (4) / Bob Schweickert (6) |
| 1961 | Warren Price (9) |
| 1960 | Warren Price |
| 1959 | Frank Eastman |
| 1958 | Billy Holsclaw (10) |
| 1957 | Jimmy Lugar / Billy Cranwell |
| 1956 | Jimmy Lugar (10) |
| 1955 | Billy Cranwell |
| 1954 | Billy Cranwell |
| 1953 | Johnny Dean / Jackie Williams |
| 1952 | Johnny Dean (11) |
| 1951 | Johnny Dean (8) / Jackie Williams (2) |
| 1950 | Bruce Fisher |
| 1949 | Bruce Fisher |
| 1948 | Bruce Fisher |
| 1947 | Ted Johnson |
| 1946 | Ted Johnson |
| 1945 | Stan Majcher |
| 1942 | Roger McClure |
| 1941 | Dick Kern (9) / Bill James (1) |
| 1940 | Dick Kern / Gene Wheeler |
| 1939 | Dick Kern / Ward Boswell |
| 1938 | Philip Galliano DeMuro / James Stuart Fixx |
| 1937 | Melvin Henry |
| 1936 | Melvin Henry / Wilson Brown |
| 1935 | Melvin Henry / Buck Carpenter / George Sodaro |
| 1934 | George Smith (7) / Duncan Holsclaw (3) |
| 1933 | Charles Morgan (9) / Duncan Holsclaw (1) |
| 1932 | Charles Morgan (9) |
| 1931 | Heinie Groth (5) / Samuel Hardwick (1) / Harry Howard (1) / Waightes Ottley (1) / Bill Porterfield (1) |
| 1930 | Bird Hooper (8) / Samuel Hardwick (1) |
| 1929 | Bird Hooper |
| 1928 | Scotty MacArthur / Bird Hooper |
| 1927 | Scotty MacArthur / Herbert McEver |
| 1926 | Scotty MacArthur / Herbert McEver |
| 1925 | George Claiborne "Speck" Anderson |
| 1924 | Arthur Roberts Jr. |
| 1923 | Harry Sutton (8) / Arthur Roberts Jr. (1) |
| 1922 | John G. ”Rip” Wallace (9) / Harry Sutton (1) |
| 1921 | John G. ”Rip” Wallace |
| 1920 | William Lybrook |
| 1919 | George Douglas Lancaster / Hank Crisp |
| 1918 | Hank Crisp (3) / Wesley Bonney (2) / William Hurst (1) / Siegel (1) |
| 1917 | Edwin Roden (6) / William Lybrook (2) / Eugene Bock (1) |
| 1916 | Edwin Roden (5) / George Lancaster (3) / Edward Funkhouser (1) |
| 1915 | Arthur Terry (4) / Vincent Dixon (2) / Edward Funkhouser (2) |
| 1914 | Millard Filmore Peake / Arthur Terry |
| 1913 | Millard Filmore Peake / Vincent Dixon |
| 1912 | James Booth Rogers (5) / W. R. Legge (3) / Asbury Nathaniel Hodgson (1) |
| 1911 | Harry Briggs Vaughan / Charles A. Bernier |
| 1910 | John Leyburn Hughes |
| 1909 | John Leyburn Hughes (7) |
| 1908 | Frederick William Connolly |
| 1907 | Edgar Seymour Sheppard |
| 1906 | William Triplett Montague / Eugene Munson Wilson |
| 1905 | James Arthur Nutter / Edwin Rollins Harris |
| 1904 | Edwin Rollins Harris |
| 1903 | Charles Edgar Bear |
| 1902 | Charles Edgar Bear (3) / Joe Ware (2) / Creighton Campbell (1) |
| 1901 | Kit DeCamps |
| 1900 | Kit DeCamps |
| 1899 | Kit DeCamps |
| 1898 | William Frazier Bell |
| 1897 | William Frazier Bell |
| 1896 | Tarpley Douglas Martin |
| 1895 | Tarpley Douglas Martin |
| 1894 | Joseph Massie |
| 1893 | John William Robinson (1) / Sid Fraser (1) |
| 1892 | Clinton Wakefield Courtland |

== Most games as starting quarterback ==
These quarterbacks have started for the Hokies in regular season games (from start of 1987 season until the end of 2017 season).

| Name | |
| GP | Games played |
| GS | Games started |
| W | Number of wins as starting quarterback |
| L | Number of losses as starting quarterback |
| T | Number of ties as starting quarterback |
| Pct | Winning Percentage as starting quarterback |

| Name | Period | GP | GS | W | L | T | % |
|---|---|---|---|---|---|---|---|
| Taylor, Tyrod | 2007–2010 | 50 | 42 | 34 | 8 | 0 | .809 |
| Randall, Bryan | 2001–2004 | 48 | 38 | 27 | 11 | 0 | .710 |
| Thomas, Logan | 2010–2013 | 45 | 40 | 26 | 14 | 0 | .650 |
| DeShazo, Maurice | 1991–1994 | 38 | 34 | 19 | 14 | 1 | .558 |
| Glennon, Sean | 2004–2008 | 37 | 26 | 18 | 8 | 0 | .692 |
| Druckenmiller, Jim | 1993–1996 | 35 | 24 | 20 | 4 | 0 | .833 |
| Furrer, Will | 1988–1991 | 34 | 33 | 15 | 17 | 1 | .454 |
| Clark, Al | 1995–1998 | 24 | 19 | 12 | 7 | 0 | .631 |
| Vick, Michael | 1999–2000 | 22 | 21 | 20 | 1 | 0 | .952 |
| Vick, Marcus | 2003, 2005 | 22 | 13 | 11 | 2 | 0 | .846 |
| Brewer, Michael | 2014–2015 | 21 | 20 | 11 | 9 | 0 | .550 |
| Motley, Brenden | 2014–2016 | 21 | 6 | 3 | 3 | 0 | .500 |
| Noel, Grant | 1999–2002 | 20 | 14 | 10 | 4 | 0 | .714 |
| Wooten, Rodd | 1989–1991 | 19 | 4 | 2 | 2 | 0 | .500 |
| Young, Cam | 1988–1989 | 17 | 7 | 3 | 4 | 0 | .428 |
| Jackson, Josh | 2017–2018 | 16 | 16 | 11 | 5 | 0 | .687 |
| Meyer, Dave | 1997–2000 | 16 | 4 | 3 | 1 | 0 | .750 |
| Evans, Jerod | 2016 | 14 | 14 | 10 | 4 | 0 | .714 |
| Willis, Ryan | 2018–2019 | 12 | 10 | 4 | 6 | 0 | .400 |
| Chapman, Erik | 1987 | 11 | 11 | 2 | 9 | 0 | .181 |
| Sorensen, Nick | 1997–1998 | 11 | 4 | 3 | 1 | 0 | .750 |
| Koel, Treg | 1992 | 5 | 1 | 0 | 1 | 0 | .000 |

== Career passing records ==
(from Starting QB's at start of 1987 season until end of 2017 season)

| Name | Comp | Att | % | Yds | TD | Int |
|---|---|---|---|---|---|---|
| Thomas, Logan | 693 | 1,248 | 55.5% | 9,003 | 53 | 39 |
| Taylor, Tyrod | 495 | 865 | 57.2% | 7,017 | 44 | 20 |
| Randall, Bryan | 490 | 833 | 58.8% | 6,508 | 48 | 31 |
| Furrer, Will | 495 | 920 | 53.7% | 5,906 | 43 | 46 |
| DeShazo, Maurice | 397 | 744 | 53.3% | 5,720 | 47 | 31 |
| Glennon, Sean | 386 | 656 | 58.8% | 4,867 | 28 | 21 |
| Brewer, Michael | 388 | 657 | 59.0% | 4,395 | 31 | 22 |
| Druckenmiller, Jim | 313 | 580 | 53.9% | 4,383 | 34 | 18 |
| Jackson, Josh | 272 | 454 | 59.9% | 3,566 | 25 | 10 |
| Evans, Jerod | 268 | 422 | 63.5% | 3,546 | 29 | 8 |
| Vick, Michael | 177 | 314 | 56.3% | 3,074 | 20 | 11 |
| Vick, Marcus | 207 | 346 | 59.8% | 2,868 | 19 | 15 |
| Willis, Ryan | 213 | 364 | 58.5% | 2,714 | 24 | 9 |
| Clark, Al | 193 | 361 | 53.4% | 2,623 | 19 | 9 |
| Noel, Grant | 158 | 284 | 55.6% | 1,971 | 18 | 11 |
| Chapman, Erik | 119 | 231 | 51.5% | 1,340 | 10 | 14 |
| Motley, Brenden | 102 | 187 | 54.5% | 1,253 | 12 | 7 |
| Wooten, Rodd | 74 | 137 | 54.0% | 903 | 3 | 9 |
| Meyer, Dave | 60 | 113 | 53.0% | 890 | 3 | 6 |
| Young, Cam | 82 | 174 | 47.1% | 716 | 1 | 7 |
| Sorensen, Nick | 42 | 80 | 52.5% | 446 | 4 | 9 |
| Koel, Treg | 24 | 60 | 40.0% | 346 | 2 | 5 |
