= List of Southern Conference football standings =

List of Southern Conference football standings may refer to:

- List of Southern Conference football standings (1921–1971)
- List of Southern Conference football standings (1972–present)
