= John Fenlon =

American football coach (1909–2000)

- Fenlon pictured in a 1947 newspaper

Biographical details
- Born: December 7, 1909; Cheboygan, Michigan, U.S.
- Died: September 2, 2000 (aged 90)

Playing career

Football
- 1930–1933: George Washington

Basketball
- 1930–1933: George Washington

Baseball
- 1932–1933: George Washington

Coaching career (HC unless noted)

Football
- 1938–1941: Richmond (assistant)
- 1942: Richmond
- 1946–1947: Richmond

Head coaching record
- Overall: 12–15–3

John Llewellyn Fenlon (December 7, 1909 – September 2, 2000) was an American college football coach. He served as the head football coach at the University of Richmond in 1942 and again from 1946 to 1947, compiling a record of 12–15–3. Fenlon attended George Washington University, where he lettered in football, basketball, and baseball in the early 1930s. He died on September 2, 2000.

== Head coaching record ==
| Year | Team | Overall | Conference | Standing | Bowl/playoffs |
|---|---|---|---|---|---|
Richmond Spiders (Southern Conference) (1942)
| 1942 | Richmond | 3–6–1 | 1–5 | 15th | |
Richmond Spiders (Southern Conference) (1946–1947)
| 1946 | Richmond | 6–2–2 | 3–2–2 | 6th | |
| 1947 | Richmond | 3–7 | 1–5 | 15th | |
| Richmond: | | 12–15–3 | 5–12–2 | | |
| Total: | | 12–15–3 | | | |
