= Herbert McEver =

American football player and sports coach

Biographical details
- Born: September 14, 1906; Birmingham, Alabama, U.S.
- Died: January 21, 1996 (aged 89); Roanoke, Virginia, U.S.

Playing career

Football
- 1925–1928: VPI
- Position: Back

Coaching career (HC unless noted)

Football
- 1942–1945: VPI

Basketball
- 1937–1944: VPI

Baseball
- 1933–1939: VPI

Head coaching record
- Overall: 9–8–1 (football); 49–71 (basketball); 41–72–1 (baseball)

Herbert Macauley "Mac" McEver (September 14, 1906 – January 21, 1996) was an American football player and coach of football, basketball, and baseball. He served as the head football coach at Virginia Agricultural and Mechanical College and Polytechnic Institute (VPI)—now known as Virginia Tech—in 1942 and 1945, compiling a record of 9–8–1. He was co-head coach with Sumner D. Tilson in 1942. McEver was also the head basketball coach at VPI from 1937 to 1944, amassing a record of 49–71, and the school's head baseball coach from 1933 to 1939, tallying a mark of 41–72–1.

McEver played football at VPI from 1925 to 1928 as part of the famed "Pony Express" backfield. He was inducted into the Virginia Sports Hall of Fame in 1980 and the Virginia Tech Sports Hall of Fame, which he helped organize, in 1983. He was the older brother of Gene McEver, who starred in football at the University of Tennessee and served as the head football coach at Davidson College and the University of North Carolina at Chapel Hill.

== Head coaching record ==
=== Football ===
Year	Team	Overall	Conference	Standing	Bowl/playoffs
VPI Goblers (Southern Conference) (1942–1945)
1942	VPI	7–2–1	5–1	2nd	
1943	No team—World War II				
1943	No team—World War II				
1945	VPI	2–6	2–5	9th	
VPI:		9–8–1	7–6		
Total:		9–8–1			

=== Basketball ===
Record table
Season	Team	Overall	Conference	Standing	Postseason
VPI Gobblers (Southern Conference) (1937–1944)
1937–38	VPI	6–8	4–5	10th	
1938–39	VPI	3–14	2–10	14th	
1939–40	VPI	4–15	1–9	15th	
1940–41	VPI	8–13	4–8	12th	
1941–42	VPI	10–10	4–8	T–11th	
1942–43	VPI	7–7	3–6	12th	
1943–44	VPI	11–4	4–1	2nd	
VPI:		49–71	22–47		
Total:		49–71			
