= 1942 Washington and Lee Generals football team =

American college football season

1942 Washington and Lee Generals football
- Conference: Southern Conference
- Record: 1–8 (0–4 SoCon)
- Head coach: Paul A. Holstein (1st season)
- Home stadium: Wilson Field

1942 Southern Conference football standings
	Conf.					Overall
Team	W		L		T	W		L		T
No. 14 William & Mary $	4	–	0	–	0	9	–	1	–	1
VPI	5	–	1	–	0	7	–	2	–	1
Wake Forest	6	–	1	–	1	6	–	2	–	1
North Carolina	3	–	1	–	1	5	–	2	–	2
Duke	3	–	1	–	1	5	–	4	–	1
NC State	3	–	1	–	2	4	–	4	–	2
Furman	3	–	3	–	0	3	–	6	–	0
The Citadel	2	–	2	–	0	5	–	2	–	0
Clemson	2	–	3	–	1	3	–	6	–	1
Davidson	2	–	4	–	1	2	–	6	–	1
VMI	2	–	4	–	1	3	–	5	–	1
George Washington	2	–	4	–	0	3	–	6	–	0
Maryland	1	–	2	–	0	7	–	2	–	0
South Carolina	1	–	4	–	0	1	–	7	–	1
Richmond	1	–	5	–	0	3	–	6	–	1
Washington and Lee	0	–	4	–	0	1	–	8	–	0
$ – Conference champion; Rankings from AP Poll

The 1942 Washington and Lee Generals football team was an American football team that represented Washington and Lee University during the 1942 college football season as a member of the Southern Conference. In their first year under head coach Paul A. Holstein, the team compiled an overall record of 1–8, with a mark of 0–4 in conference play.

Washington and Lee was ranked at No. 202 (out of 590 college and military teams) in the final rankings under the Litkenhous Difference by Score System for 1942.

== Schedule ==
Date	Opponent	Site	Result	Attendance	Source
September 26	vs. West Virginia*	Laidley Field; Charleston, WV	L 7–21	8,000	
October 3	at Kentucky*	Stoll Field; Lexington, KY	L 0–53		
October 10	at Rollins*	Orlando Stadium; Orlando, FL	L 0–46	10,000	
October 17	Hampden–Sydney*	Wilson Field; Lexington, VA	W 20–13	5,000	
October 24	vs. VPI	Municipal Stadium; Lynchburg, VA	L 6–19	3,000	
October 31	at Richmond	City Stadium; Richmond, VA	L 6–8		
November 7	Virginia*	Wilson Field; Lexington, VA	L 7–34	4,000	
November 14	at Davidson	American Legion Memorial Stadium; Charlotte, NC	L 13–21	3,000	
November 21	at Maryland	Byrd Stadium; College Park, MD	L 28–32	7,500	
*Non-conference game
