= Sumner D. Tilson =

American football player and coach (1898–1964)

Tex Tilson
Biographical details
- Born: July 6, 1898; Childress, Texas, U.S.
- Died: November 13, 1964 (aged 66); Staunton, Virginia, U.S.

Playing career

Football
- 1918–1922: VPI
- Positions: Tackle, guard

Coaching career (HC unless noted)
- 1942: VPI

Head coaching record
- Overall: 7–2–1

Sumner Dewey "Tex" Tilson (July 5, 1898 – November 13, 1964) was an American football player and coach. He served as head football coach at Virginia Agricultural and Mechanical College and Polytechnic Institute (VPI)—now known as Virginia Tech—for one season, in 1942, compiling a record of 7–2–1. Tilson also played college football at VPI.

== Biography ==
Tilson was born on July 5, 1898, in Childress, Texas, to William Ransom Tilson and Sallie Ellen Williams. His grandfather Granville Tilson was a cattle trader in Matador, Texas. He died in November 1964 in Virginia.

== Head coaching record ==
Year	Team	Overall	Conference	Standing	Bowl/playoffs
VPI Gobblers (Southern Conference) (1942)
1942	VPI	7–2–1	5–1	2nd	
VPI:		7–2–1	5–1		
Total:		7–2–1			
