= 1942 Duke Blue Devils football team =

American college football season

1942 Duke Blue Devils football
- Conference: Southern Conference
- Record: 5–4–1 (3–1–1 SoCon)
- Head coach: Eddie Cameron (1st season)
- MVP: Tom Burns
- Captain: Jim Smith
- Home stadium: Duke Stadium

1942 Southern Conference football standings
	Conf.					Overall
Team	W		L		T	W		L		T
No. 14 William & Mary $	4	–	0	–	0	9	–	1	–	1
VPI	5	–	1	–	0	7	–	2	–	1
Wake Forest	6	–	1	–	1	6	–	2	–	1
North Carolina	3	–	1	–	1	5	–	2	–	2
Duke	3	–	1	–	1	5	–	4	–	1
NC State	3	–	1	–	2	4	–	4	–	2
Furman	3	–	3	–	0	3	–	6	–	0
The Citadel	2	–	2	–	0	5	–	2	–	0
Clemson	2	–	3	–	1	3	–	6	–	1
Davidson	2	–	4	–	1	2	–	6	–	1
VMI	2	–	4	–	1	3	–	5	–	1
George Washington	2	–	4	–	0	3	–	6	–	0
Maryland	1	–	2	–	0	7	–	2	–	0
South Carolina	1	–	4	–	0	1	–	7	–	1
Richmond	1	–	5	–	0	3	–	6	–	1
Washington and Lee	0	–	4	–	0	1	–	8	–	0
$ – Conference champion; Rankings from AP Poll

The 1942 Duke Blue Devils football team was an American football team that represented Duke University as a member of the Southern Conference during the 1942 college football season. In its first season under head coach Eddie Cameron, the team compiled a 5–4–1 record (3–1–1 against conference opponents) and outscored opponents by a total of 211 to 98. Jim Smith was the team captain.

Duke was ranked at No. 20 (out of 590 college and military teams) in the final rankings under the Litkenhous Difference by Score System for 1942.

The team played its home games at Duke Stadium in Durham, North Carolina.

== Schedule ==
Date	Opponent	Site	Result	Attendance	Source
September 26	vs. Davidson	Bowman Gray Stadium; Winston-Salem, NC	W 21–0	2,500	
October 3	at Wake Forest	Groves Stadium; Wake Forest, NC (rivalry)	L 7–20	7,000	
October 10	Georgia Pre-Flight*	Duke Stadium; Durham, NC	L 12–26	7,500	
October 17	vs. No. 9 Colgate*	Civic Stadium; Buffalo, NY	W 34–0	18,782	
October 24	at Pittsburgh*	Pitt Stadium; Pittsburgh, PA	W 28–0	15,000–20,000	
October 31	No. 5 Georgia Tech*^{†}	Duke Stadium; Durham, NC	L 7–26	24,000	
November 7	Maryland	Duke Stadium; Durham, NC	W 42–0	7,500	
November 14	at North Carolina	Kenan Memorial Stadium; Chapel Hill, NC (rivalry)	T 13–13	32,000	
November 21	NC State	Duke Stadium; Durham, NC (rivalry)	W 47–0	15,000	
November 28	at Jacksonville NAS*	Jacksonville, FL	L 0–13	7,500	
*Non-conference game; ^{†}Homecoming; Rankings from AP Poll released prior to the game
