= 1942 Clemson Tigers football team =

American college football season

1942 Clemson Tigers football
- Conference: Southern Conference
- Record: 3–6–1 (2–3–1 SoCon)
- Head coach: Frank Howard (3rd season)
- Captain: Charlie Wright
- Home stadium: Memorial Stadium

1942 Southern Conference football standings
	Conf.					Overall
Team	W		L		T	W		L		T
No. 14 William & Mary $	4	–	0	–	0	9	–	1	–	1
VPI	5	–	1	–	0	7	–	2	–	1
Wake Forest	6	–	1	–	1	6	–	2	–	1
North Carolina	3	–	1	–	1	5	–	2	–	2
Duke	3	–	1	–	1	5	–	4	–	1
NC State	3	–	1	–	2	4	–	4	–	2
Furman	3	–	3	–	0	3	–	6	–	0
The Citadel	2	–	2	–	0	5	–	2	–	0
Clemson	2	–	3	–	1	3	–	6	–	1
Davidson	2	–	4	–	1	2	–	6	–	1
VMI	2	–	4	–	1	3	–	5	–	1
George Washington	2	–	4	–	0	3	–	6	–	0
Maryland	1	–	2	–	0	7	–	2	–	0
South Carolina	1	–	4	–	0	1	–	7	–	1
Richmond	1	–	5	–	0	3	–	6	–	1
Washington and Lee	0	–	4	–	0	1	–	8	–	0
$ – Conference champion; Rankings from AP Poll

The 1942 Clemson Tigers football team was an American football that represented Clemson College as a member of the Southern Conference during the 1942 college football season. In their third season under head coach Frank Howard, the Tigers compiled a 3–6–1 record (2–3–1 against conference opponents), finished ninth in the conference, and were outscored by a total of 138 to 100. Memorial Stadium was inaugurated September 19 with a win against Presbyterian College. Clemson's 200th win came on Big Thursday against South Carolina.

Charlie Wright was the team captain. The team's statistical leaders included tailback Marion Butler with 504 passing yards, 616 rushing yards and 36 points scored (6 touchdowns).

End Chip Clark was selected as a first-team player on the 1942 All-Southern Conference football team.

Clemson was ranked at No. 89 (out of 590 college and military teams) in the final rankings under the Litkenhous Difference by Score System for 1942.

== Schedule ==
Date	Opponent	Site	Result	Attendance	Source
September 19	Presbyterian*	Memorial Stadium; Clemson, SC	W 32–13		
September 26	vs. VMI	City Stadium; Lynchburg, VA	T 0–0	3,000	
October 3	vs. NC State	American Legion Memorial Stadium; Charlotte, NC (rivalry)	L 6–7	10,000	
October 10	at Boston College*	Fenway Park; Boston, MA (rivalry)	L 7–14	18,500–23,400	
October 22	at South Carolina	State Fair Grounds Stadium; Columbia, SC (rivalry)	W 18–6	22,000	
October 31	at Wake Forest	Groves Stadium; Wake Forest, NC	L 6–19	4,500	
November 7	George Washington	Memorial Stadium; Clemson, SC	L 0–7	3,500	
November 14	at Jacksonville NAS*	Mason Field; Jacksonville, FL	L 6–24	5,000	
November 21	Furman	Memorial Stadium; Clemson, SC	W 12–7	12,000	
November 28	at No. 16 Auburn	Auburn Stadium; Auburn, AL (rivalry)	L 13–41	10,000	
*Non-conference game; Rankings from AP Poll released prior to the game
