= 1942 The Citadel Bulldogs football team =

American college football season

1942 The Citadel Bulldogs football
- Conference: Southern Conference
- Record: 5–2 (2–2 SoCon)
- Head coach: Bo Rowland (3rd season)
- Home stadium: Johnson Hagood Stadium

1942 Southern Conference football standings
	Conf.					Overall
Team	W		L		T	W		L		T
No. 14 William & Mary $	4	–	0	–	0	9	–	1	–	1
VPI	5	–	1	–	0	7	–	2	–	1
Wake Forest	6	–	1	–	1	6	–	2	–	1
North Carolina	3	–	1	–	1	5	–	2	–	2
Duke	3	–	1	–	1	5	–	4	–	1
NC State	3	–	1	–	2	4	–	4	–	2
Furman	3	–	3	–	0	3	–	6	–	0
The Citadel	2	–	2	–	0	5	–	2	–	0
Clemson	2	–	3	–	1	3	–	6	–	1
Davidson	2	–	4	–	1	2	–	6	–	1
VMI	2	–	4	–	1	3	–	5	–	1
George Washington	2	–	4	–	0	3	–	6	–	0
Maryland	1	–	2	–	0	7	–	2	–	0
South Carolina	1	–	4	–	0	1	–	7	–	1
Richmond	1	–	5	–	0	3	–	6	–	1
Washington and Lee	0	–	4	–	0	1	–	8	–	0
$ – Conference champion; Rankings from AP Poll

The 1942 The Citadel Bulldogs football team represented The Citadel, The Military College of South Carolina in the 1942 college football season. Bo Rowland served as head coach for the third season. The Bulldogs played as members of the Southern Conference and played home games at Johnson Hagood Stadium.

The Citadel was ranked at No. 99 (out of 590 college and military teams) in the final rankings under the Litkenhous Difference by Score System for 1942.

No team was fielded again until 1946 due to World War II.

== Schedule ==
Date	Opponent	Site	Result	Attendance	Source
September 26	Camp Davis*	Johnson Hagood Stadium; Charleston, SC	W 32–0		
October 3	Presbyterian*	Johnson Hagood Stadium; Charleston, SC	W 47–12	5,000	
October 10	George Washington	Johnson Hagood Stadium; Charleston, SC	W 14–2	6,000	
October 17	Newberry*	Johnson Hagood Stadium; Charleston, SC	W 21–7	4,000	
October 30	vs. South Carolina	County Fairgrounds; Orangeburg, SC	L 0–14	10,000	
November 7	at Furman	Sirrine Stadium; Greenville, SC (rivalry)	L 0–20	4,000	
November 21	Davidson	Johnson Hagood Stadium; Charleston, SC	W 21–9	5,000	
*Non-conference game
