= 1942 George Washington Colonials football team =

American college football season

1942 George Washington Colonials football
- Conference: Southern Conference
- Record: 3–6 (2–4 SoCon)
- Head coach: Johnny Baker (1st season)
- Home stadium: Griffith Stadium

1942 Southern Conference football standings
	Conf.					Overall
Team	W		L		T	W		L		T
No. 14 William & Mary $	4	–	0	–	0	9	–	1	–	1
VPI	5	–	1	–	0	7	–	2	–	1
Wake Forest	6	–	1	–	1	6	–	2	–	1
North Carolina	3	–	1	–	1	5	–	2	–	2
Duke	3	–	1	–	1	5	–	4	–	1
NC State	3	–	1	–	2	4	–	4	–	2
Furman	3	–	3	–	0	3	–	6	–	0
The Citadel	2	–	2	–	0	5	–	2	–	0
Clemson	2	–	3	–	1	3	–	6	–	1
Davidson	2	–	4	–	1	2	–	6	–	1
VMI	2	–	4	–	1	3	–	5	–	1
George Washington	2	–	4	–	0	3	–	6	–	0
Maryland	1	–	2	–	0	7	–	2	–	0
South Carolina	1	–	4	–	0	1	–	7	–	1
Richmond	1	–	5	–	0	3	–	6	–	1
Washington and Lee	0	–	4	–	0	1	–	8	–	0
$ – Conference champion; Rankings from AP Poll

The 1942 George Washington Colonials football team was an American football team that represented George Washington University in the Southern Conference during the 1942 college football season. In its first and only season under head coach Johnny Baker, the team compiled a 3–6 record (2–4 against conference opponents), finished in 12th place in the Southern Conference, and was outscored by a total of 149 to 62.

George Washington was ranked at No. 133 (out of 590 college and military teams) in the final rankings under the Litkenhous Difference by Score System for 1942.

After the 1942 season, the school did not field another football team until 1946.

== Schedule ==
Date	Opponent	Site	Result	Attendance	Source
September 25	Western Maryland*	Griffith Stadium; Washington, DC	W 20–0		
October 3	Richmond	Griffith Stadium; Washington, DC	W 27–0	5,000	
October 10	at The Citadel	Johnson Hagood Stadium; Charleston, SC	L 2–14	6,000	
October 16	Furman	Griffith Stadium; Washington, DC	L 0–6	1,500	
October 24	at William & Mary	Cary Field; Williamsburg, VA	L 0–61	7,000	
October 30	Kentucky*	Griffith Stadium; Washington, DC	L 6–27	5,000	
November 7	at Clemson	Memorial Stadium; Clemson, SC	W 7–0	3,500	
November 13	Wake Forest	Griffith Stadium; Washington, DC	L 0–20		
November 21	at Georgetown*	Griffith Stadium; Washington, DC	L 0–21	10,000	
*Non-conference game
