= 1942 North Carolina Tar Heels football team =

American college football season

1942 North Carolina Tar Heels football
- Conference: Southern Conference
- Record: 5–2–2 (3–1–1 SoCon)
- Head coach: Jim Tatum (1st season)
- Captains: Joe Austin; Tank Marshall
- Home stadium: Kenan Memorial Stadium

1942 Southern Conference football standings
	Conf.					Overall
Team	W		L		T	W		L		T
No. 14 William & Mary $	4	–	0	–	0	9	–	1	–	1
VPI	5	–	1	–	0	7	–	2	–	1
Wake Forest	6	–	1	–	1	6	–	2	–	1
North Carolina	3	–	1	–	1	5	–	2	–	2
Duke	3	–	1	–	1	5	–	4	–	1
NC State	3	–	1	–	2	4	–	4	–	2
Furman	3	–	3	–	0	3	–	6	–	0
The Citadel	2	–	2	–	0	5	–	2	–	0
Clemson	2	–	3	–	1	3	–	6	–	1
Davidson	2	–	4	–	1	2	–	6	–	1
VMI	2	–	4	–	1	3	–	5	–	1
George Washington	2	–	4	–	0	3	–	6	–	0
Maryland	1	–	2	–	0	7	–	2	–	0
South Carolina	1	–	4	–	0	1	–	7	–	1
Richmond	1	–	5	–	0	3	–	6	–	1
Washington and Lee	0	–	4	–	0	1	–	8	–	0
$ – Conference champion; Rankings from AP Poll

The 1942 North Carolina Tar Heels football team represented the University of North Carolina at Chapel Hill during the 1942 college football season. The Tar Heels were led by first-year head coach Jim Tatum and played their home games at Kenan Memorial Stadium. They competed as a member of the Southern Conference. Tatum left the school to join the Navy at the end of the season. He returned to coach the Tar Heels from 1956 to 1958.

North Carolina was ranked at No. 48 (out of 590 college and military teams) in the final rankings under the Litkenhous Difference by Score System for 1942.

== Schedule ==
Date	Time	Opponent	Rank	Site	Result	Attendance	Source
September 26	3:00 p.m.	Wake Forest		Kenan Memorial Stadium; Chapel Hill, NC (rivalry)	W 6–0	10,000	
October 3	3:00 p.m.	South Carolina		Kenan Memorial Stadium; Chapel Hill, NC (rivalry)	W 18–6	12,000	
October 10	1:45 p.m.	at Fordham*		Polo Grounds; New York, NY	T 0–0	19,500	
October 17	2:30 p.m.	No. 13 Duquesne*		Kenan Memorial Stadium; Chapel Hill, NC	W 13–6	14,000	
October 24	3:30 p.m.	at Tulane*	No. 19	Tulane Stadium; New Orleans, LA	L 14–29	22,000	
October 31	2:30 p.m.	at NC State		Riddick Stadium; Raleigh, NC (rivalry)	L 14–21	14,000	
November 7	2:30 p.m.	vs. Davidson		American Legion Memorial Stadium; Charlotte, NC	W 43–14		
November 14	2:00 p.m.	Duke		Kenan Memorial Stadium; Chapel Hill, NC (rivalry)	T 13–13	32,000	
November 21	2:00 p.m.	at Virginia*		Scott Stadium; Charlottesville, VA (South's Oldest Rivalry)	W 28–13	7,000	
*Non-conference game; Rankings from AP Poll released prior to the game; All times are in Eastern time

== Rankings ==
Ranking movements Legend: ██ Increase in ranking ██ Decrease in ranking — = Not ranked
	Week							
Poll	1	2	3	4	5	6	7	Final
AP	—	19	—	—	—	—	—	—
