= 1942 NC State Wolfpack football team =

American college football season

1942 NC State Wolfpack football
- Conference: Southern Conference
- Record: 4–4–2 (3–1–2 SoCon)
- Head coach: Williams Newton (6th season)
- Home stadium: Riddick Stadium

1942 Southern Conference football standings
| | Conf. | | | | | Overall |
| Team | W | | L | | T | W | | L | | T |
|---|---|---|---|---|---|---|---|---|---|---|
| No. 14 William & Mary $ | 4 | – | 0 | – | 0 | 9 | – | 1 | – | 1 |
| VPI | 5 | – | 1 | – | 0 | 7 | – | 2 | – | 1 |
| Wake Forest | 6 | – | 1 | – | 1 | 6 | – | 2 | – | 1 |
| North Carolina | 3 | – | 1 | – | 1 | 5 | – | 2 | – | 2 |
| Duke | 3 | – | 1 | – | 1 | 5 | – | 4 | – | 1 |
| NC State | 3 | – | 1 | – | 2 | 4 | – | 4 | – | 2 |
| Furman | 3 | – | 3 | – | 0 | 3 | – | 6 | – | 0 |
| The Citadel | 2 | – | 2 | – | 0 | 5 | – | 2 | – | 0 |
| Clemson | 2 | – | 3 | – | 1 | 3 | – | 6 | – | 1 |
| Davidson | 2 | – | 4 | – | 1 | 2 | – | 6 | – | 1 |
| VMI | 2 | – | 4 | – | 1 | 3 | – | 5 | – | 1 |
| George Washington | 2 | – | 4 | – | 0 | 3 | – | 6 | – | 0 |
| Maryland | 1 | – | 2 | – | 0 | 7 | – | 2 | – | 0 |
| South Carolina | 1 | – | 4 | – | 0 | 1 | – | 7 | – | 1 |
| Richmond | 1 | – | 5 | – | 0 | 3 | – | 6 | – | 1 |
| Washington and Lee | 0 | – | 4 | – | 0 | 1 | – | 8 | – | 0 |
$ – Conference champion; Rankings from AP Poll

The 1942 NC State Wolfpack football team was an American football team that represented North Carolina State University as a member of the Southern Conference (SoCon) during the 1942 college football season. In its sixth season under head coach Williams Newton, the team compiled a 4–4–2 record (3–1–2 against SoCon opponents) and was outscored by a total of 142 to 70.

NC State was ranked at No. 90 (out of 590 college and military teams) in the final rankings under the Litkenhous Difference by Score System for 1942.

== Schedule ==
| Date | Opponent | Site | Result | Attendance | Source |
|---|---|---|---|---|---|
| September 19 | vs. Davidson | Legion Stadium; Wilmington, NC | T 0–0 | 10,000 | |
| September 26 | Richmond | Riddick Stadium; Raleigh, NC | W 13–0 | 5,000 | |
| October 3 | vs. Clemson | American Legion Memorial Stadium; Charlotte, NC (rivalry) | W 7–6 | 10,000 | |
| October 10 | North Carolina Pre-Flight* | Riddick Stadium; Raleigh, NC | L 7–19 | 10,000 | |
| October 17 | Wake Forest | Riddick Stadium; Raleigh, NC (rivalry) | T 0–0 | 12,000 | |
| October 24 | at Holy Cross* | Fitton Field; Worcester, MA | L 0–28 | 7,500 | |
| October 31 | North Carolina | Riddick Stadium; Raleigh, NC (rivalry) | W 21–14 | 14,000 | |
| November 7 | at Miami (FL)* | Burdine Stadium; Miami, FL | W 2–0 | 11,066 | |
| November 14 | Georgetown* | Riddick Stadium; Raleigh, NC | L 20–28 | | |
| November 21 | at Duke | Duke Stadium; Durham, NC (rivalry) | L 0–47 | 15,000 | |
*Non-conference game
