= 1942 VMI Keydets football team =

American college football season

1942 VMI Keydets football
- Conference: Southern Conference
- Record: 3–5–1 (2–4–1 SoCon)
- Head coach: Pooley Hubert (6th season)
- Home stadium: Alumni Field

1942 Southern Conference football standings
	Conf.					Overall
Team	W		L		T	W		L		T
No. 14 William & Mary $	4	–	0	–	0	9	–	1	–	1
VPI	5	–	1	–	0	7	–	2	–	1
Wake Forest	6	–	1	–	1	6	–	2	–	1
North Carolina	3	–	1	–	1	5	–	2	–	2
Duke	3	–	1	–	1	5	–	4	–	1
NC State	3	–	1	–	2	4	–	4	–	2
Furman	3	–	3	–	0	3	–	6	–	0
The Citadel	2	–	2	–	0	5	–	2	–	0
Clemson	2	–	3	–	1	3	–	6	–	1
Davidson	2	–	4	–	1	2	–	6	–	1
VMI	2	–	4	–	1	3	–	5	–	1
George Washington	2	–	4	–	0	3	–	6	–	0
Maryland	1	–	2	–	0	7	–	2	–	0
South Carolina	1	–	4	–	0	1	–	7	–	1
Richmond	1	–	5	–	0	3	–	6	–	1
Washington and Lee	0	–	4	–	0	1	–	8	–	0
$ – Conference champion; Rankings from AP Poll

The 1942 VMI Keydets football team was an American football team that represented the Virginia Military Institute (VMI) during the 1942 college football season as a member of the Southern Conference. In their sixth year under head coach Pooley Hubert, the team compiled an overall record of 3–5–1.

VMI was ranked at No. 160 (out of 590 college and military teams) in the final rankings under the Litkenhous Difference by Score System for 1942.

== Schedule ==
Date	Time	Opponent	Site	Result	Attendance	Source
September 26		vs. Clemson	City Stadium; Lynchburg, VA	T 0–0	3,000	
October 2		at Temple*	Temple Stadium; Philadelphia, PA	L 6–7	15,000	
October 10		at Virginia*	Scott Stadium; Charlottesville, VA	W 38–18	8,000	
October 17		Maryland^{†}	Alumni Field; Lexington, VA	W 29–0	5,000	
October 24		at Richmond	City Stadium; Richmond, VA (rivalry)	W 20–6	7,000	
October 31		Davidson	Alumni Field; Lexington, VA	L 6–24		
November 7		at Wake Forest	Bowman Gray Stadium; Winston-Salem, NC	L 0–28	6,000	
November 14		vs. No. 15 William & Mary	Foreman Field; Norfolk, VA (rivalry)	L 6–27	17,500	
November 26	2:30 p.m.	vs. VPI	Victory Stadium; Roanoke, VA (rivalry)	L 6–20	22,500	
*Non-conference game; ^{†}Homecoming; Rankings from AP Poll released prior to the game
