= 1942 Richmond Spiders football team =

American college football season

1942 Richmond Spiders football
- Conference: Southern Conference
- Record: 3–6–1 (1–5 SoCon)
- Head coach: John Fenlon (1st season)
- Captains: Warren Pace; Maxwell Katz
- Home stadium: City Stadium

1942 Southern Conference football standings
	Conf.					Overall
Team	W		L		T	W		L		T
No. 14 William & Mary $	4	–	0	–	0	9	–	1	–	1
VPI	5	–	1	–	0	7	–	2	–	1
Wake Forest	6	–	1	–	1	6	–	2	–	1
North Carolina	3	–	1	–	1	5	–	2	–	2
Duke	3	–	1	–	1	5	–	4	–	1
NC State	3	–	1	–	2	4	–	4	–	2
Furman	3	–	3	–	0	3	–	6	–	0
The Citadel	2	–	2	–	0	5	–	2	–	0
Clemson	2	–	3	–	1	3	–	6	–	1
Davidson	2	–	4	–	1	2	–	6	–	1
VMI	2	–	4	–	1	3	–	5	–	1
George Washington	2	–	4	–	0	3	–	6	–	0
Maryland	1	–	2	–	0	7	–	2	–	0
South Carolina	1	–	4	–	0	1	–	7	–	1
Richmond	1	–	5	–	0	3	–	6	–	1
Washington and Lee	0	–	4	–	0	1	–	8	–	0
$ – Conference champion; Rankings from AP Poll

The 1942 Richmond Spiders football team was an American football team that represented the University of Richmond as a member of the Southern Conference (SoCon) during the 1942 college football season. In their first season under head coach John Fenlon, Richmond compiled a 3–6–1 record, with a mark of 1–5 in conference play, finishing in 15th place in the SoCon.

Richmond was ranked at No. 135 (out of 590 college and military teams) in the final rankings under the Litkenhous Difference by Score System for 1942.

== Schedule ==
Date	Time	Opponent	Site	Result	Attendance	Source
September 19		Camp Pickett*	City Stadium; Richmond, VA	W 27–0	6,000	
September 26		at NC State	Riddick Stadium; Raleigh, NC	L 0–13	5,000	
October 3		at George Washington	Griffith Stadium; Washington, DC	L 0–27	5,000	
October 10		Randolph–Macon*	City Stadium; Richmond, VA	L 0–6	4,000	
October 17		Virginia*	City Stadium; Richmond, VA	T 7–7	5,000	
October 24		VMI	City Stadium; Richmond, VA (rivalry)	L 6–20	7,000	
October 31		Washington and Lee	City Stadium; Richmond, VA	W 8–6		
November 7	3:00 p.m.	VPI	City Stadium; Richmond, VA	L 7–16	7,000	
November 14		at Hampden–Sydney*	Hampden Sydney, VA	W 26–0		
November 26		No. 19 William & Mary	City Stadium; Richmond, VA (rivalry)	L 0–10	22,500	
*Non-conference game; Rankings from AP Poll released prior to the game
