= 1942 Davidson Wildcats football team =

American college football season

1942 Davidson Wildcats football
- Conference: Southern Conference
- Record: 2–6–1 (2–4–1 SoCon)
- Head coach: Gene McEver (7th season)
- Home stadium: Richardson Field; American Legion Memorial Stadium

1942 Southern Conference football standings
	Conf.					Overall
Team	W		L		T	W		L		T
No. 14 William & Mary $	4	–	0	–	0	9	–	1	–	1
VPI	5	–	1	–	0	7	–	2	–	1
Wake Forest	6	–	1	–	1	6	–	2	–	1
North Carolina	3	–	1	–	1	5	–	2	–	2
Duke	3	–	1	–	1	5	–	4	–	1
NC State	3	–	1	–	2	4	–	4	–	2
Furman	3	–	3	–	0	3	–	6	–	0
The Citadel	2	–	2	–	0	5	–	2	–	0
Clemson	2	–	3	–	1	3	–	6	–	1
Davidson	2	–	4	–	1	2	–	6	–	1
VMI	2	–	4	–	1	3	–	5	–	1
George Washington	2	–	4	–	0	3	–	6	–	0
Maryland	1	–	2	–	0	7	–	2	–	0
South Carolina	1	–	4	–	0	1	–	7	–	1
Richmond	1	–	5	–	0	3	–	6	–	1
Washington and Lee	0	–	4	–	0	1	–	8	–	0
$ – Conference champion; Rankings from AP Poll

The 1942 Davidson Wildcats football team was an American football team that represented Davidson College during the 1942 college football season as a member of the Southern Conference. In their seventh year under head coach Gene McEver, the team compiled an overall record of 2–6–1, with a mark of 2–4–1 in conference play, and finished in 10th place in the SoCon.

Davidson was ranked at No. 118 (out of 590 college and military teams) in the final rankings under the Litkenhous Difference by Score System for 1942.

== Schedule ==
Date	Opponent	Site	Result	Attendance	Source
September 19	vs. NC State	Legion Stadium; Wilmington, NC	T 0–0	10,000	
September 26	vs. Duke	Bowman Gray Stadium; Winston-Salem, NC	L 0–21	2,500	
October 3	Rollins*	American Legion Memorial Stadium; Charlotte, NC	L 0–14	5,000	
October 10	at VPI	Miles Stadium; Blacksburg, VA	L 0–16	4,000	
October 17	at No. 6 Georgia Tech*	Grant Field; Atlanta, GA	L 0–33	10,000	
October 31	at VMI	Alumni Field; Lexington, VA	W 24–6		
November 7	North Carolina^{†}	American Legion Memorial Stadium; Charlotte, NC	L 14–43		
November 14	Washington and Lee	American Legion Memorial Stadium; Charlotte, NC	W 21–13	3,000	
November 21	at The Citadel	Johnson Hagood Stadium; Charleston, SC	L 9–21		
*Non-conference game; ^{†}Homecoming; Rankings from AP Poll released prior to the game
