= 1942 Furman Purple Hurricane football team =

American college football season

1942 Furman Purple Hurricane football
- Conference: Southern Conference
- Record: 3–6 (3–3 SoCon)
- Head coach: Dizzy McLeod (11th season)
- Captain: Dewey Proctor
- Home stadium: Sirrine Stadium

1942 Southern Conference football standings
	Conf.					Overall
Team	W		L		T	W		L		T
No. 14 William & Mary $	4	–	0	–	0	9	–	1	–	1
VPI	5	–	1	–	0	7	–	2	–	1
Wake Forest	6	–	1	–	1	6	–	2	–	1
North Carolina	3	–	1	–	1	5	–	2	–	2
Duke	3	–	1	–	1	5	–	4	–	1
NC State	3	–	1	–	2	4	–	4	–	2
Furman	3	–	3	–	0	3	–	6	–	0
The Citadel	2	–	2	–	0	5	–	2	–	0
Clemson	2	–	3	–	1	3	–	6	–	1
Davidson	2	–	4	–	1	2	–	6	–	1
VMI	2	–	4	–	1	3	–	5	–	1
George Washington	2	–	4	–	0	3	–	6	–	0
Maryland	1	–	2	–	0	7	–	2	–	0
South Carolina	1	–	4	–	0	1	–	7	–	1
Richmond	1	–	5	–	0	3	–	6	–	1
Washington and Lee	0	–	4	–	0	1	–	8	–	0
$ – Conference champion; Rankings from AP Poll

The 1942 Furman Purple Hurricane football team was an American football team that represented Furman University as a member of the Southern Conference (SoCon) during the 1942 college football season. In their eleventh year under head coach Dizzy McLeod, the Purple Hurricane compiled an overall record of 3–6 with a conference mark of 3–3, and finished seventh in the SoCon.

Furman was ranked at No. 88 (out of 590 college and military teams) in the final rankings under the Litkenhous Difference by Score System for 1942.

== Schedule ==
Date	Opponent	Site	Result	Attendance	Source
September 26	VPI	Sirrine Stadium; Greenville, SC	L 6–7		
October 3	at Georgia*	Sanford Stadium; Athens, GA	L 7–40	8,000	
October 10	Wake Forest	Sirrine Stadium; Greenville, SC	L 6–14	7,000	
October 16	at George Washington	Griffith Stadium; Washington, DC	W 6–0	1,500	
October 24	at No. 17 Tennessee*	Shields–Watkins Field; Knoxville, TN	L 7–52		
October 31	at Miami (FL)*	Burdine Stadium; Miami, FL	L 13–32	7,421	
November 7	The Citadel	Sirrine Stadium; Greenville, SC (rivalry)	W 20–0	4,000	
November 14	at South Carolina	Carolina Municipal Stadium; Columbia, SC	W 6–0	10,000	
November 21	at Clemson	Memorial Stadium; Clemson, SC	L 7–12	12,000	
*Non-conference game; Rankings from AP Poll released prior to the game
