= 1942 Maryland Terrapins football team =

American college football season

1942 Maryland Terrapins football
- Conference: Southern Conference
- Record: 7–2 (1–2 SoCon)
- Head coach: Clark Shaughnessy (1st season)
- Home stadium: Byrd Stadium (original)

1942 Southern Conference football standings
	Conf.					Overall
Team	W		L		T	W		L		T
No. 14 William & Mary $	4	–	0	–	0	9	–	1	–	1
VPI	5	–	1	–	0	7	–	2	–	1
Wake Forest	6	–	1	–	1	6	–	2	–	1
North Carolina	3	–	1	–	1	5	–	2	–	2
Duke	3	–	1	–	1	5	–	4	–	1
NC State	3	–	1	–	2	4	–	4	–	2
Furman	3	–	3	–	0	3	–	6	–	0
The Citadel	2	–	2	–	0	5	–	2	–	0
Clemson	2	–	3	–	1	3	–	6	–	1
Davidson	2	–	4	–	1	2	–	6	–	1
VMI	2	–	4	–	1	3	–	5	–	1
George Washington	2	–	4	–	0	3	–	6	–	0
Maryland	1	–	2	–	0	7	–	2	–	0
South Carolina	1	–	4	–	0	1	–	7	–	1
Richmond	1	–	5	–	0	3	–	6	–	1
Washington and Lee	0	–	4	–	0	1	–	8	–	0
$ – Conference champion; Rankings from AP Poll

The 1942 Maryland Terrapins football team represented the University of Maryland in the 1942 college football season. In their first season under head coach Clark Shaughnessy, the Terrapins compiled a 7–2 record (1–2 in conference), finished in 13th place in the Southern Conference, and outscored their opponents 198 to 124. The team's victories included shutouts against Connecticut (34–0) and Florida (13–0).

Maryland was ranked at No. 101 (out of 590 college and military teams) in the final rankings under the Litkenhous Difference by Score System for 1942.

Shaughnessy returned as Maryland's head coach in 1946.

== Schedule ==
Date	Opponent	Site	Result	Attendance	Source
September 26	Connecticut*	Byrd Stadium; College Park, MD	W 34–0	6,000	
October 3	Lakehurst NAS*	Byrd Stadium; College Park, MD	W 14–0		
October 10	Rutgers*	Municipal Stadium; Baltimore, MD	W 27–13	15,000	
October 17	at VMI	Alumni Field; Lexington, VA	L 0–29	5,000	
October 24	vs. Western Maryland*	Municipal Stadium; Baltimore, MD	W 51–0	10,000	
October 31	vs. Florida*	Griffith Stadium; Washington, DC	W 13–0	10,000	
November 7	at Duke	Duke Stadium; Durham, NC	L 0–42	7,500	
November 14	at Virginia*	Scott Stadium; Charlottesville, VA (rivalry)	W 27–12	4,000	
November 21	Washington & Lee	Byrd Stadium; College Park, MD	W 32–28	7,500	
*Non-conference game
