= 1942 Wake Forest Demon Deacons football team =

American college football season

1942 Wake Forest Demon Deacons football
- Conference: Southern Conference
- Record: 6–2–1 (6–1–1 SoCon)
- Head coach: Peahead Walker (6th season)
- Captain: Pat Preston
- Home stadium: Groves Stadium

1942 Southern Conference football standings
	Conf.					Overall
Team	W		L		T	W		L		T
No. 14 William & Mary $	4	–	0	–	0	9	–	1	–	1
VPI	5	–	1	–	0	7	–	2	–	1
Wake Forest	6	–	1	–	1	6	–	2	–	1
North Carolina	3	–	1	–	1	5	–	2	–	2
Duke	3	–	1	–	1	5	–	4	–	1
NC State	3	–	1	–	2	4	–	4	–	2
Furman	3	–	3	–	0	3	–	6	–	0
The Citadel	2	–	2	–	0	5	–	2	–	0
Clemson	2	–	3	–	1	3	–	6	–	1
Davidson	2	–	4	–	1	2	–	6	–	1
VMI	2	–	4	–	1	3	–	5	–	1
George Washington	2	–	4	–	0	3	–	6	–	0
Maryland	1	–	2	–	0	7	–	2	–	0
South Carolina	1	–	4	–	0	1	–	7	–	1
Richmond	1	–	5	–	0	3	–	6	–	1
Washington and Lee	0	–	4	–	0	1	–	8	–	0
$ – Conference champion; Rankings from AP Poll

The 1942 Wake Forest Demon Deacons football team was an American football team that represented Wake Forest University during the 1942 college football season. In its sixth season under head coach Peahead Walker, the team compiled a 6–2–1 record and finished in third place in the Southern Conference.

Back John Cochran and tackle Pat Preston were selected by the Associated Press as first-team players on the 1942 All-Southern Conference football team.

Wake Forest was ranked at No. 38 (out of 590 college and military teams) in the final rankings under the Litkenhous Difference by Score System for 1942.

== Schedule ==
Date	Opponent	Site	Result	Attendance	Source
September 26	at North Carolina	Kenan Memorial Stadium; Chapel Hill, NC (rivalry)	L 0–6	9,000	
October 3	Duke	Groves Stadium; Wake Forest, NC (rivalry)	W 20–7	7,000	
October 10	at Furman	Sirrine Stadium; Greenville, SC	W 14–6	7,000	
October 17	at NC State	Riddick Stadium; Raleigh, NC (rivalry)	T 0–0	12,000	
October 24	at No. 10 Boston College*	Fenway Park; Boston, MA	L 0–27	20,000	
October 31	Clemson	Groves Stadium; Wake Forest, NC	W 19–6	4,500	
November 7	vs. VMI	Bowman Gray Stadium; Winston-Salem, NC	W 28–0	6,000	
November 13	at George Washington	Griffith Stadium; Washington, DC	W 20–0		
November 26	vs. South Carolina	American Legion Memorial Stadium; Charlotte, NC	W 33–14	8,500	
*Non-conference game; Rankings from AP Poll released prior to the game
