= 1942 South Carolina Gamecocks football team =

American college football season

1942 South Carolina Gamecocks football
- Conference: Southern Conference
- Record: 1–7–1 (1–4 SoCon)
- Head coach: Rex Enright (5th season)
- Captains: Louis Sossamon; John Leitner
- Home stadium: Carolina Municipal Stadium

1942 Southern Conference football standings
	Conf.					Overall
Team	W		L		T	W		L		T
No. 14 William & Mary $	4	–	0	–	0	9	–	1	–	1
VPI	5	–	1	–	0	7	–	2	–	1
Wake Forest	6	–	1	–	1	6	–	2	–	1
North Carolina	3	–	1	–	1	5	–	2	–	2
Duke	3	–	1	–	1	5	–	4	–	1
NC State	3	–	1	–	2	4	–	4	–	2
Furman	3	–	3	–	0	3	–	6	–	0
The Citadel	2	–	2	–	0	5	–	2	–	0
Clemson	2	–	3	–	1	3	–	6	–	1
Davidson	2	–	4	–	1	2	–	6	–	1
VMI	2	–	4	–	1	3	–	5	–	1
George Washington	2	–	4	–	0	3	–	6	–	0
Maryland	1	–	2	–	0	7	–	2	–	0
South Carolina	1	–	4	–	0	1	–	7	–	1
Richmond	1	–	5	–	0	3	–	6	–	1
Washington and Lee	0	–	4	–	0	1	–	8	–	0
$ – Conference champion; Rankings from AP Poll

The 1942 South Carolina Gamecocks football team was an American football team that represented the University of South Carolina as a member of the Southern Conference during the 1942 college football season. In their fifth season under head coach Rex Enright, the Gamecocks compiled an overall record of 1–7–1 with a mark of 1–4 in conference play, placing 14th in the SoCon. The team's only victory was over The Citadel.

South Carolina was ranked at No. 81 (out of 590 college and military teams) in the final rankings under the Litkenhous Difference by Score System for 1942.

== Schedule ==
Date	Opponent	Site	Result	Attendance	Source
September 26	Tennessee*	Carolina Stadium; Columbia, SC (rivalry)	T 0–0	14,000	
October 3	at North Carolina	Kenan Memorial Stadium; Chapel Hill, NC (rivalry)	L 6–18	12,000	
October 10	at West Virginia*	Mountaineer Field; Morgantown, WV	L 0–13	8,046	
October 22	Clemson	State Fair Grounds Stadium; Columbia, SC (rivalry)	L 6–18	22,000	
October 30	vs. The Citadel	County Fairgrounds; Orangeburg, SC	W 14–0	10,000	
November 7	at Alabama*	Denny Stadium; Tuscaloosa, AL	L 0–29	10,000	
November 14	Furman	Carolina Stadium; Columbia, SC	L 0–6	10,000	
November 21	at Miami (FL)*	Burdine Stadium; Miami, FL	L 6–13	9,774	
November 26	vs. Wake Forest	American Legion Memorial Stadium; Charlotte, NC	L 14–33	8,500	
*Non-conference game
