= 1942 William & Mary Indians football team =

American college football season

1942 William & Mary Indians football

SoCon champion
- Conference: Southern Conference

Ranking
- AP: No. 14
- Record: 9–1–1 (4–0 SoCon)
- Head coach: Carl M. Voyles (4th season)
- Captain: Marvin Bass
- Home stadium: Cary Field

1942 Southern Conference football standings
	Conf.					Overall
Team	W		L		T	W		L		T
No. 14 William & Mary $	4	–	0	–	0	9	–	1	–	1
VPI	5	–	1	–	0	7	–	2	–	1
Wake Forest	6	–	1	–	1	6	–	2	–	1
North Carolina	3	–	1	–	1	5	–	2	–	2
Duke	3	–	1	–	1	5	–	4	–	1
NC State	3	–	1	–	2	4	–	4	–	2
Furman	3	–	3	–	0	3	–	6	–	0
The Citadel	2	–	2	–	0	5	–	2	–	0
Clemson	2	–	3	–	1	3	–	6	–	1
Davidson	2	–	4	–	1	2	–	6	–	1
VMI	2	–	4	–	1	3	–	5	–	1
George Washington	2	–	4	–	0	3	–	6	–	0
Maryland	1	–	2	–	0	7	–	2	–	0
South Carolina	1	–	4	–	0	1	–	7	–	1
Richmond	1	–	5	–	0	3	–	6	–	1
Washington and Lee	0	–	4	–	0	1	–	8	–	0
$ – Conference champion; Rankings from AP Poll

The 1942 William & Mary Indians football team represented the College of William & Mary as a member of the Southern Conference (SoCon) during the 1942 college football season. Led by fourth-year head coach Carl M. Voyles, the Indians compiled an overall record of 9–1–1 with a mark of 4–0 in conference play, and finished as SoCon champion. William & Mary played home games at Cary Field in Williamsburg, Virginia.

William & Mary was ranked at No. 36 (out of 590 college and military teams) in the final rankings under the Litkenhous Difference by Score System for 1942.

== Schedule ==
Date	Time	Opponent	Rank	Site	Result	Attendance	Source
September 18		vs. Hampden–Sydney*		Foreman Field; Norfolk, VA	W 27–0	8,000	
September 26		at Navy*		Thompson Stadium; Annapolis, MD	W 3–0	10,000	
October 3	3:00 p.m.	at VPI		Miles Stadium; Blacksburg, VA	W 21–7	9,000	
October 10		at Harvard*		Harvard Stadium; Boston, MA	T 7–7	10,000	
October 24		George Washington^{†}		Cary Field; Williamsburg, VA	W 61–0		
October 31		Dartmouth*	No. 18	Cary Field; Williamsburg, VA	W 35–14	7,000	
November 7		Randolph–Macon*	No. 17	Cary Field; Williamsburg, VA	W 40–0	1,500	
November 14		vs. VMI	No. 15	Foreman Field; Norfolk, VA (rivalry)	W 27–6	17,500	
November 21		North Carolina Pre-Flight*	No. 13	Cary Field; Williamsburg, VA	L 0–14	10,000	
November 26		at Richmond	No. 19	City Stadium; Richmond, VA (rivalry)	W 10–0	22,500	
December 5		at Oklahoma*	No. 14	Oklahoma Memorial Stadium; Norman, OK	W 14–7	4,500	
*Non-conference game; ^{†}Homecoming; Rankings from AP Poll released prior to the game

== Rankings ==
Ranking movements Legend: ██ Increase in ranking ██ Decrease in ranking — = Not ranked ( ) = First-place votes
	Week							
Poll	1	2	3	4	5	6	7	Final
AP	—	—	18	17	15	13	19	14 (1)

== NFL draft selections ==
= Pro Football Hall of Fame	= Canadian Football Hall of Fame	= College Football Hall of Fame

NFL Draft Selections

#	Year	Round	Pick	Overall	Name	Team	Position
1	1943	6	3	43	Harvey Johnson	Brooklyn Dodgers	Back
2	1943	11	6	96	Glenn Knox	New York Giants	End
3	1943	14	4	124	Garrard "Buster" Ramsey	Chicago Cardinals	Guard
4	1943	16	1	141	Marvin Bass	Detroit Lions	Tackle
5	1943	22	6	206	John Korczowski	New York Giants	Back
6	1944	13	9	129	Bob Longacre	Pittsburgh Steelers	Back
7	1944	17	4	168	Jack Freeman	Philadelphia Eagles	Back
