= 1942 VPI Gobblers football team =

American college football season

1942 VPI Gobblers football
- Conference: Southern Conference
- Record: 7–2–1 (5–1 SoCon)
- Head coach: Sumner D. Tilson & Herbert McEver (1st season)
- Captain: Bill James
- Home stadium: Miles Stadium

1942 Southern Conference football standings
	Conf.					Overall
Team	W		L		T	W		L		T
No. 14 William & Mary $	4	–	0	–	0	9	–	1	–	1
VPI	5	–	1	–	0	7	–	2	–	1
Wake Forest	6	–	1	–	1	6	–	2	–	1
North Carolina	3	–	1	–	1	5	–	2	–	2
Duke	3	–	1	–	1	5	–	4	–	1
NC State	3	–	1	–	2	4	–	4	–	2
Furman	3	–	3	–	0	3	–	6	–	0
The Citadel	2	–	2	–	0	5	–	2	–	0
Clemson	2	–	3	–	1	3	–	6	–	1
Davidson	2	–	4	–	1	2	–	6	–	1
VMI	2	–	4	–	1	3	–	5	–	1
George Washington	2	–	4	–	0	3	–	6	–	0
Maryland	1	–	2	–	0	7	–	2	–	0
South Carolina	1	–	4	–	0	1	–	7	–	1
Richmond	1	–	5	–	0	3	–	6	–	1
Washington and Lee	0	–	4	–	0	1	–	8	–	0
$ – Conference champion; Rankings from AP Poll

The 1942 VPI Gobblers football team represented Virginia Agricultural and Mechanical College and Polytechnic Institute in the 1942 college football season. The team was led by their head coaches Sumner D. Tilson and Herbert McEver and finished with a record of seven wins, two losses and one tie (7–2–1).

VPI was ranked at No. 76 (out of 590 college and military teams) in the final rankings under the Litkenhous Difference by Score System for 1942.

== Schedule ==
Date	Time	Opponent	Site	Result	Attendance	Source
September 19		vs. Catawba*	Roanoke Municipal Stadium; Roanoke, VA	W 28–14	3,000	
September 26		at Furman	Sirrine Stadium; Greenville, SC	W 7–6		
October 3	3:00 p.m.	William & Mary^{†}	Miles Stadium; Blacksburg, VA	L 7–21	9,000	
October 10		Davidson	Miles Stadium; Blacksburg, VA	W 16–0	4,000	
October 17	3:30 p.m.	vs. Kentucky*	Roanoke Municipal Stadium; Roanoke, VA	T 21–21	10,000	
October 24	3:00 p.m.	vs. Washington and Lee	Lynchburg Memorial Stadium; Lynchburg, VA	W 19–6	3,000	
October 31	2:30 p.m.	vs. Virginia*	Foreman Field; Norfolk, VA (rivalry)	W 20–14	6,000	
November 7	3:00 p.m.	at Richmond	City Stadium; Richmond, VA	W 16–7	7,000	
November 14	2:45 p.m.	at Army*	Michie Stadium; West Point, NY	L 7–19	10,000	
November 26	2:30 p.m.	vs. VMI	Roanoke Municipal Stadium; Roanoke, VA (rivalry)	W 20–6	22,500	
*Non-conference game; ^{†}Homecoming; All times are in Eastern time

== Before the season ==
The 1941 VPI Gobblers football team compiled a 6–4 record and were led by Jimmy Kitts in his first season as head coach. In August 1942, Kitts was commissioned as a lieutenant in the United States Navy Reserve to become a physical training instructor at a Navy Air Force preflight training school. Assistant Coach Jules Medwin also went into the service shortly after Kitts. The athletic council chose assistant coaches Herbert McEver and Sumner D. Tilson to be co-coaches until Kitts returned.

== Game summaries ==
=== Catawba ===
Catawba vs. VPI

Team	1	2	3	4	Total
Catawba	7	7	0	0	14
• VPI	7	7	7	7	28

- Date: September 19, 1942
- Location: Roanoke Municipal Stadium
  Roanoke, VA
- Game attendance: 3,000
- Game weather: "over 100 degrees"
- Referee: J. Miller

VPI's first game of the season was against Catawba at newly-built Roanoke Municipal Stadium in Roanoke, Virginia in front of 3,000 spectators. Catawba scored first, with a 16-yard touchdown pass from Dwight Holshouser to Harold Bowen. Georgiana successfully kicked the extra point. Later in the first quarter, Jack Gallagher scored VPI's first touchdown with a 40-yard run, with Roger McClure making the extra point. In the second quarter, Holshouser threw again to Bowen for a 23-yard touchdown and Georgiana kicked another extra point. Before halftime, VPI answered with a 74-yard drive, resulting in a 31-yard touchdown pass from Gallagher to Billy James. McClure completed another extra point, tying the game. After halftime, Gallagher scored VPI's third touchdown on a 54-yard run with McClure making the extra point. VPI score its final touchdown in the fourth quarter when James Norment blocked Bowen's kick for a return touchdown. VPI's Gallagher averaged 11.8 yards per rush in the game.

The starting lineup for VPI was: ? (left end), Maskas (left tackle), Belcher (left guard), Davis (center), Fuller (right guard), Judy (right tackle), Chasen (right end), McClure (quarterback), Gallagher (left halfback), James (right halfback), Blandford (fullback). The substitutes were: Ashworth, Duda, Foltz, Garth, Hodges, Hoffman, T. Johnson, W. Johnson, McWherter, Norment, Pearce, Rucker, Sagnette, Vincent and Warner.

The starting lineup for Catawba was: Steve Johnson (left end), Ray Yagiello (left tackle), Jim Dickey (left guard), Donald E. Fuoss (center), Dick Todderud (right guard), George Haley (right tackle), Donald Hanley (right end), Dwight Holshouser (quarterback), Lynn Hunter (left halfback), Harold Bowen (right halfback), Anthony Georgiana (fullback). The substitutes were: Bill Feeney, Bill Iannicelli, Ken Karl, Ken Rhodes and Bob Werner.

=== Furman ===
VPI at Furman

Team	1	2	3	4	Total
• VPI	0	0	0	7	7
Furman	0	0	0	6	6

- Date: September 26, 1942
- Location: Sirrine Stadium
  Greenville, SC
- Game weather: Rain

Following the win over Catawba, VPI played Furman on September 26 in Greenville, South Carolina. The game was scoreless for the first three quarters. In the third quarter, VPI's Roger McClure attempted a field goal from the 37-yard line, but he was not successful. Furman's Barnett completed a fake punt and ran for 18 yards. In the fourth quarter, Furman scored when Fred Hilliard blocked a VPI punt and Furman's Carl Roesch returned the ball for a touchdown. However, Furman missed the extra point, with Hamer's kick going low and wide. VPI then scored a touchdown pass from Bill James to Elmer Wilson and McClure made the extra point. The game ended with a VPI win, 7-6.

=== William & Mary ===
William & Mary at VPI

Team	1	2	3	4	Total
• W&M	7	0	7	7	21
VPI	0	0	7	0	7

- Date: October 3, 1942
- Location: Miles Stadium
  Blacksburg, VA
- Game start: 3:00 p.m.
- Game attendance: 9,000

VPI's first home game in 1942 was a homecoming loss against William & Mary in front of 9,000 spectators. William & Mary's first touchdown came in the first period on a 57-yard scoring drive that ended with Bob Longacre running into the endzone from the five-yard line. That was the only scoring done by either team in the first half. In the third quarter, Longacre threw a 23-yard touchdown pass to Glenn Knox for the Indian's second touchdown. VPI's only touchdown also came in the third quarter, with a 64-yard run by Joe Foltz. The Indian's last touchdown came in the final period, with Al Vandeweghe running for an 11-yard score. All of William & Mary's successful extra point attempts were completed by Harvey Johnson.

William & Mary finished the game with fifteen first downs, 153 rushing yards, and completed six of 13 passes for 137 yards with no interceptions. VPI finished the game with four first downs and 95 rushing yards. VPI's star running back, Jack Gallagher, did not play due to injury.

The starting lineup for VPI was: Lawson (left end), Maskas (left tackle), Belcher (left guard), Davis (center), Rucker (right guard), Judy (right tackle), Chasen (right end), McClure (quarterback), James (left halfback), Sagnette (right halfback), Blandford (fullback). The substitutes were: Ashworth, Barbour, Duda, Foltz, Hodges, Hoffman, T. Johnson, McClaugherty, Mengulas, Norment, Pearce, Taylor, Vincent and Warner.

The starting lineup for William & Mary was: Al Vandeweghe (left end), Marvin Bass (left tackle), Buster Ramsey (left guard), Tex Warrington (center), Drewery Holloway (right guard), Harold Fields (right tackle), Newell Irwin (right end), Nick Forkovitch (quarterback), Bob Longacre (left halfback), Dave Bucher (right halfback), Harvey Johnson (fullback). The substitutes were: Bob Barret, Andy Blagg, Johnny Clowes, Jack Freeman, Elmo Gooden, Johnny Grembowitz, Buddy Hubard, Harry Johns, Bill Klein, M. Knox, John Korczowski, Herb Poplinger, Bill Safko, Ralph Sazio, Bob Steckroth and Mel Wright.

=== Davidson ===
Davidson vs. VPI

Team	1	2	3	4	Total
Davidson	0	0	0	0	0
• VPI	3	2	3	8	16

- Date: October 10, 1942
- Location: Miles Stadium
  Blacksburg, VA
- Game attendance: 4,000

VPI beat Davidson on October 10th in front of 4,000 people. In the first quarter, Roger McClure kicked a field goal from the 30-yard line to give VPI a three point lead. VPI scored again in the second quarter with a safety by tackling Davidson's Pat Williams in the endzone, and the score was 5-0 VPI at halftime. In the third period, McClure kicked another successful field goal. In the fourth quarter, VPI capped a 65-yard drive with a four-yard diving touchdown catch from Fred Ashworth to Jim Norment on fourth down. McClure missed the extra point, his first missed extra point of the season. The final points of the game came from another safety by VPI near the end of the fourth quarter, after John Maskas blocked a Davidson punt in their endzone.

VPI finished the game with fifteen first downs, 214 rushing yards and 55 passing yards. Davidson finished the game with five first downs, 47 rushing yards, and zero passing yards. Davidson's Mac Bruce did not play in the game due to an injured knee.

The starting lineup for VPI was: Lawson (left end), Maskas (left tackle), Fuller (left guard), Davis (center), Pearce (right guard), Judy (right tackle), Chasen (right end), McClure (quarterback), Foltz (left halfback), Ashworth (right halfback), Blandford (fullback). The substitutes were: Belcher, Berry, Clark, Duda, Gallagher, Garth, Hodges, Hoffman, James, T. Johnson, Massie, McClaugherty, Mengulas, Norment, Rucker, Sagnette, Vincent, Warner, Wilson and Wright.

The starting lineup for Davidson was: Scotty Paterson (left end), William Shaw (left tackle), Alf Taylor (left guard), Red Burke (center), Ben Moore (right guard), Herbert Rainey (right tackle), Pat Williams (right end), Earl "Red" Bethea (quarterback), George Peters (left halfback), Art Roach (right halfback), Benjamin Lacy (fullback). The substitutes were: Eugene Bingham, Haywood Brinegar, Dunn, Robert Durant, Wileman Ehly, Floyd, Johnny Frederick, Gwynn, Hay, McLean, Dick O'Hair, Tommy Peters, Benjamin Washburn and B. Williams.

=== Kentucky ===
Kentucky vs. VPI

Team	1	2	3	4	Total
Kentucky	7	7	7	0	21
VPI	0	0	14	7	21

- Date: October 17, 1942
- Location: Roanoke Municipal Stadium
  Roanoke, VA
- Game attendance: 10,000

On October 17th, VPI played Kentucky at Roanoke Municipal Stadium in Roanoke, Virginia in front of approximately 10,000 people. VPI came back from a two-touchdown deficit to tie the game, 21-21. Kentucky scored first, with Phil Cutchin scoring a touchdown after seven minutes of play. Kentucky scored again in the second quarter, when Charley Kuhn returned a VPI punt 55 yards for a touchdown. Kuhn kicked both extra points and Kentucky led at the end of the first half, 14-0. In the third quarter, VPI's Maskas blocked a Kentucky punt on the 15-yard line and Clark recovered the ball for VPI's first touchdown. A few minutes later, VPI's Blandford had a bad punt and Kentucky recovered at VPI's 25-yard line. VPI was then penalized for unnecessary roughness and the ball was moved to the 10-yard line. Kuhn then faked a pass and ran the ball out of bounds at the 2-yard line. John Hurst then ran it in for Kentucky's third touchdown of the game. Kuhn's extra point attempt was blocked by VPI, but Kuhn then picked up the ball and ran it in for the extra point. Near the end of the third quarter, VPI's James had a 31-yard rush, then Gallagher threw to James for 24-yard reception and got to Kentucky's 7-yard line. Blandford then ran in for a touchdown. In the fourth quarter, VPI had an 80-yard touchdown drive with Blandford running in for his second score. McClure tied the game with a successful extra point. Near the end of the game, McClure attempted a 41-yard field goal, but it fell short and the game ended in a tie.

VPI finished the game with 12 first downs, 183 rushing yards and 52 passing yards. Kentucky had nine first downs, 146 rushing yards and 45 passing yards. VPI recovered three fumbles, and Kentucky intercepted two passes.

The starting lineup for VPI was: Clark (left end), Maskas (left tackle), Fuller (left guard), Davis (center), Belcher (right guard), Judy (right tackle), Chasen (right end), McClure (quarterback), Foltz (left halfback), Ashworth (right halfback), Blandford (fullback). The substitutes were: Gallagher, Hodges, Hoffman, James, Johnson, McClaugherty, Mengulas, Norment, Pearce, Rucker, Sagnette, Taylor, Vincent and Wilson.

The starting lineup for Kentucky was: George Sengle (left end), Clyde Johnson (left tackle), Rich Colvin (left guard), Charley Walker (center), Norm Beck (right guard), Clark Wood (right tackle), Carl Althaus (right end), Bill Mosley (quarterback), Phil Cutchin (left halfback), Charley Kuhn (right halfback), John Hurst (fullback). The substitutes were: Tommy Ewing, Bill Griffin, Bob Herbert, Hut Jones, Ralph Kohl, Lair, Allen Parr, Jay Rhodemyre, Taylor, Jesse Tunstill, Paul Walker and Leo Yarutis.

=== Washington and Lee ===
Washington and Lee vs. VPI

Team	1	2	3	4	Total
W&L	0	0	6	0	6
• VPI	0	7	6	6	19

- Date: October 24, 1942
- Location: Lynchburg Memorial Stadium
  Lynchburg, VA
- Game start: 3:00 p.m.
- Game attendance: 3,000

The starting lineup for VPI was: Wilson (left end), Maskas (left tackle), Pearce (left guard), Hoffmann (center), Rucker (right guard), Judy (right tackle), Chasen (right end), McClure (quarterback), Gallagher (left halfback), Ashworth (right halfback), Blandford (fullback). The substitutes were: Belcher, Davis, Foltz, Fuller, Hodges, S. Johnson, T. Johnson, W. Johnson, McClaugherty, Mengulas, Norment, Sagnette, Taylor, Vincent and Warner.

The starting lineup for Washington and Lee was: Jack Roehl (left end), Lillard Ailor (left tackle), Frank DiLoreto (left guard), Dyke Norman (center), Bev Fitzpatrick (right guard), John Rulevich (right tackle), Raymond "Pinky" Norman (right end), Paul Cavaliere (quarterback), Harry Baugher (left halfback), Harry Harner (right halfback), Dick Working (fullback). The substitutes were: Theodore Ciesla, Jay Cook, James Daves, William Furman, Kaplan, Edmund Lawrence, Bob Mehorter, Alexander "Lud" Michaux, David Russell, James Wheater and Sam Williams.

=== Virginia ===
Virginia vs. VPI

Team	1	2	3	4	Total
UVA	0	0	0	14	14
• VPI	6	0	14	0	20

- Date: October 31, 1942
- Location: Foreman Field
  Norfolk, VA
- Game start: 2:30 p.m.
- Game attendance: 6,000
- Referee: Henry Armstrong (Tufts)

The starting lineup for VPI was: Wilson (left end), Maskas (left tackle), Fuller (left guard), Hoffmann (center), Rucker (right guard), Judy (right tackle), Chasen (right end), McClure (quarterback), Gallagher (left halfback), Ashworth (right halfback), Blandford (fullback). The substitutes were: Foltz, Hodges, Hoffman, T. Johnson, W. Johnson, McClaugherty, Mengulas, Norment, Sagnette and Warner.

The starting lineup for Virginia was: Tom Dudley (left end), Milton Parlow (left tackle), Irwin Lakin (left guard), Charlie Cooper (center), James Bear (right guard), Robert Sieler (right tackle), William Hill (right end), Eddie Bryant (quarterback), Don D. Niklason (left halfback), Tom Steutzer (right halfback), George Grimes (fullback). The substitutes were: Tabb Gillette, Robert Hurt, Ed Kreick, George Neff, Charles Pillon, William Rea, Eric Schlesinger and Henry Uihlein.

=== Richmond ===
VPI at Richmond

Team	1	2	3	4	Total
• VPI	6	7	0	3	16
Richmond	0	0	0	7	7

- Date: November 7, 1942
- Location: City Stadium
  Richmond, VA
- Game start: 3:00 p.m.
- Game attendance: 7,000

The starting lineup for VPI was: Wilson (left end), Mengulas (left tackle), Fuller (left guard), Hoffmann (center), Belcher (right guard), Judy (right tackle), Chasen (right end), McClure (quarterback), Foltz (left halfback), Ashworth (right halfback), Blandford (fullback). The substitutes were: Davis, Gallagher, Garth, Hodges, T. Johnson, W. Johnson, McClaugherty, Norment, Pearce, Rucker, Sagnette, Taylor, Vincent and Warner.

The starting lineup for Richmond was: Ulysses Savage (left end), Daniel Sasmor (left tackle), Bob Gill (left guard), Steve Silianoff (center), Dick "Square" Fisher (right guard), Maxwell Katz (right tackle), Houston Sizer (right end), Patrick Fenlon (quarterback), John Gleason (left halfback), Warren Pace (right halfback), Jack Wilbourne (fullback). The substitutes were: Bane, Charles Bellis, Joe Fortunato, Bud Graham, Bay Jacobs, Johnson, Francis "Fitz" Laurinaitis, Courtney Lawler, Tom Nichols, Carroll Richard, William Scheerer and Bob Thalman.

=== Army ===
VPI at Army

Team	1	2	3	4	Total
VPI	0	0	0	7	7
• Army	6	6	7	0	19

- Date: November 14, 1942
- Location: Michie Stadium
  West Point, NY
- Game start: 2:45 p.m.
- Game attendance: 10,000

The starting lineup for VPI was: Wilson (left end), Maskas (left tackle), Fuller (left guard), Davis (center), Belcher (right guard), Judy (right tackle), Chasen (right end), McClure (quarterback), Foltz (left halfback), Ashworth (right halfback), Vincent (fullback).

The starting lineup for Army was: James Kelleher (left end), Francis E. Merritt (left tackle), Wilson (left guard), Cas Myslinski (center), Mesereau (right guard), Robin Olds (right tackle), Hennesy (right end), Roberts (quarterback), Henry Mazur (left halfback), Ashworth (right halfback), Vincent (fullback). The substitutes were: Tom Lombardo, Murphy and Bob Woods.

=== VMI ===
VPI vs. VMI

Team	1	2	3	4	Total
• VPI	0	7	6	7	20
VMI	6	0	0	0	6

- Date: November 26, 1942
- Location: Victory Stadium
  Roanoke, VA
- Game start: 2:30 p.m.
- Game attendance: 22,500

The starting lineup for VPI was: Wilson (left end), Maskas (left tackle), Fuller (left guard), Davis (center), Rucker (right guard), Judy (right tackle), Chasen (right end), McClaugherty (quarterback), Gallagher (left halfback), James (right halfback), McClure (fullback). The substitutes were: Ashworth, Foltz, W. Johnson, Hoffman, Lawson, Mengulas, Pearce, Taylor, Vincent and Warner.

The starting lineup for VMI was: Billy Clark (left end), Clyde Ellington (left tackle), W. Dow Markin (left guard), James Demmler (center), Julius Minton (right guard), Charlie Marks (right tackle), William McIntyre (right end), Dick DeShazo (quarterback), Johnny Stevens (left halfback), Jimmy Matthews (right halfback), Joe Muha (fullback). The substitutes were: Joe Black, Lee Bowman, Richard Burruss, John Coppedge, Paul Louis, Richard Mapp, Joseph McCullough, Thomas McGraw, Bosh Pritchard, Arthur Seay, Barney Skladany, Jim Sloan, Emil Sotnyk, Alfred Turriziani and Bill Ward.

== After the season ==
In December 1942, Elmer Wilson was chosen by his teammates as captain for the 1943 football season.

=== 1943 Season Cancellation ===
In December 1942, VPI released their 10-game schedule for 1943. The planned schedule was:

- September 18 - Catawba in Blacksburg, Virginia.
- September 25 - Maryland in Roanoke, Virginia.
- October 2 - Virginia, with location undecided.
- October 9 - William & Mary in Richmond, Virginia.
- October 16 - West Virginia in Morgantown, West Virginia.
- October 23 - Washington and Lee in Lynchburg, Virginia.
- October 30 - Furman in Blacksburg, Virginia.
- November 6 - Richmond in Blacksburg, Virginia.
- November 13 - The Citadel in Charleston, South Carolina.
- November 25 - VMI in Roanoke, Virginia.

However, by January 1943, VPI athletic director William L. Younger was speculating that unless eligibility rules were changed for the duration of World War II regarding underclassman and servicemen on campus for training, VPI would not have a fall intercollegiate athletic program. By June 1943, only six of the original 10 games were still on the schedule. The game against Catawba was originally cancelled because VPI scheduled their summer quarter convocation on the same date, but it was later rescheduled for November 13. The games against Washington and Lee, Furman, and The Citadel were cancelled because the schools stopped their football programs for the duration of the war. On June 26, 1943, VPI released a revised eight-game schedule. The schedule was:

- September 25 - Maryland in Roanoke, Virginia.
- October 2 - Virginia in Norfolk, Virginia.
- October 9 - William & Mary in Richmond, Virginia.
- October 16 - West Virginia in Morgantown, West Virginia.
- October 30 - North Carolina Pre-Flight School in Roanoke, Virginia.
- November 6 - Richmond in Blacksburg, Virginia.
- November 13 - Catawba in Blacksburg, Virginia.
- November 25 - VMI in Roanoke, Virginia.

After many schools cancelled their football season due to a lack of eligible players, the NCAA eventually repealed the freshman prohibition for the duration of the war. Nevertheless, the War Department kept its prohibition of servicemen trainees participating in intercollegiate sports. Younger stated that, excluding of the Army trainees, VPI only had two men that had ever played football. After the War Department's decision, VPI surveyed the Corps of Cadets in August 1943 to determine how many can and will play football. The survey asked the participants several questions, including: if they definitely expected to return for the fall quarter; if they would remain on campus between quarters for daily football practice, and if they would practice until Thanksgiving. VPI also needed to fix their coaching issue because Tilson and McEver, the co-coaches from 1942, were helping train the servicemen assigned to VPI. After the survey was held, the athletic council met to determine the fate of the 1943 season. On August 21, schools that were scheduled to play VPI were notified that VPI would not be fielding a football team in 1943.

== NFL draft selections ==
= Pro Football Hall of Fame	= Canadian Football Hall of Fame	= College Football Hall of Fame

Year	Round	Pick	Overall	Name	Team	Position
1944	14	11	142	John Maskas	Boston Yanks	Guard/Tackle

== Players ==
=== Roster ===
VPI 1942 roster
Fred Ashworth; Billy Barbour; Barco; Baros; Alton Belcher; Mason Blandford; Carter; Irvin Chasen; Daniel Clark; William Davis; John Peter Duda; John Elliot; Joe Foltz; Nelson Fuller; Jack Gallagher	William Anderson Garth; Thomas Hines; George Hodges; Joe Hoffmann; Bill James (Capt.); Samuel Johnson; Ted Johnson; William "Stud" Johnson; Ben Judy; Frank Lawson; John Maskas; Thomas Massie; Allen McClaugherty; Roger McClure; K. Ned McWherter	Gus Mengulas; James Norment; Horace Pearce; Read Nichols Pierce; John Rucker; Robert Warren Sagnette; James Sharpe; William Alexandra Shelton; Talbot; Alfred Taylor; Art Vincent; Paul Warner; Elmer Wilson; Alfonso Wright, Jr.

=== Varsity letter winners ===
Twenty-eight players received varsity letters for their participation on the 1942 VPI team.

Player	Hometown	Notes
Fred Gill Ashworth	Kenova, West Virginia	World War II veteran (Lieutenant Colonel, Army).
Billy Shelby Barbour	Lavalette, West Virginia	
Alton Harwood Belcher	Petersburg, Virginia	World War II veteran (2nd Lieutenant, Army). Participated in D-Day, the liberation of Paris, and the Battle of the Bulge.
Mason Harper Blandford	Beaumont, Virginia	World War II veteran (Lt. (j.g.), Navy).
Irvin Jean Chasen	Richmond, Virginia	World War II veteran (1st Lieutenant, Army). Awarded four separate battlefield ribbons and the Combat Infantryman Badge.
Daniel Joseph Clark	Pittsburgh, Pennsylvania	World War II veteran (Captain, Air Force).
William Earnest Davis	Sutton, West Virginia	
Joseph Francis Foltz	Durham, North Carolina	World War II veteran (1st Lieutenant, Air Force).
Nelson Thomas Fuller	Phoebus, Virginia	World War II veteran (Major, Air Force).
John Edward "Jack" Gallagher	Roselle Park, New Jersey	World War II veteran (Sergeant, Army). Awarded Purple Heart.
George Dewey Hodges, Jr.	Baltimore, Maryland	
Joseph William Hoffmann, Jr.	Richmond, Virginia	World War II veteran (Army).
William Wilson "Bill" James (Capt.)	Hampton, Virginia	World War II and Korean War veteran (1st Lieutenant, Army).
William B. Johnson	Hopewell, Virginia	
Ted James Johnson	Narrows, Virginia	World War II veteran (Army).
Samuel Benjamin Judy	Belleville, West Virginia	
Frank Lawson	Hampton, Virginia	
Ioannis Demetrios “John James” Maskas	Monessen, Pennsylvania	World War II veteran (Marines). Emigrated with family from Kampos, Chios, Greece.
Charles Allen McClaugherty	Narrows, Virginia	World War II veteran (Marines).
Roger Nelson McClure	Glasgow, West Virginia	World War II veteran (Captain, Army).
Augustus Paul Mengulas	Norfolk, Virginia	World War II veteran (Army).
James Broaddus Norment	Sparta, Virginia	World War II veteran (2nd Lieutenant, Army). Awarded Silver Star Medal.
Horace Lee Pearce, Jr.	Hampton, Virginia	World War II veteran (Navy).
John William Rucker	Delaplane, Virginia	
Alfred Taylor	Norton, Virginia	
Arthur Mario Vincent, Sr.	Pittsburgh, Pennsylvania	
Paul Ambrose Warner, Jr.	Hamilton, Virginia	
William Elmer Wilson	Hampton, Virginia	World War II veteran (Army).
