= 1942 Memphis State Tigers football team =

American college football season

1942 Memphis State Tigers football
- Conference: Independent
- Record: 2–7
- Head coach: Lefty Jamerson (1st season)
- Captains: Preston Watts; Frank Simmons
- Home stadium: Crump Stadium

1942 Southern college football independents records
	Conf.			Overall
Team	W	L	T	W		L		T
Louisiana Normal (Grambling)		–		9	–	0	–	0
Delaware		–		8	–	0	–	0
Mississippi Southern		–		4	–	0	–	0
Sewanee		–		1	–	0	–	0
Miami (FL)		–		7	–	2	–	0
Delaware State		–		3	–	1	–	1
Middle Tennessee State Teachers		–		4	–	2	–	1
Chattanooga		–		7	–	4	–	0
Georgetown		–		5	–	3	–	1
Navy		–		5	–	4	–	0
West Virginia		–		5	–	4	–	0
Western Maryland		–		4	–	4	–	1
Tennessee Tech		–		3	–	4	–	2
Virginia		–		2	–	6	–	1
Roanoke		–		1	–	5	–	1

The 1942 Memphis State Tigers football team was an American football team that represented Memphis State College (now known as the University of Memphis) as an independent during the 1942 college football season. In their first season and season under head coach Lefty Jamerson, the Tigers compiled a 2–7 record.

Memphis State was ranked at No. 360 (out of 590 college and military teams) in the final rankings under the Litkenhous Difference by Score System for 1942.

== Schedule ==
Date	Opponent	Site	Result	Attendance	Source
September 24	Middle Tennessee State Teachers	Crump Stadium; Memphis, TN	L 13–21		
October 2	Ouachita Baptist	Crump Stadium; Memphis, TN	L 7–32		
October 9	at Southwest Missouri State	SMS Stadium; Springfield, MO	W 6–0	2,500	
October 17	Union (TN)	Crump Stadium; Memphis, TN	L 0–39		
October 23	at Chattanooga	Chamberlain Field; Chattanooga, TN	L 19–44	3,000	
October 31	at Ole Miss	Hemingway Stadium; Oxford, MS (rivalry)	L 0–48		
November 5	Murray State	Crump Stadium; Memphis, TN	W 21–0	1,500	
November 13	at Southeastern Louisiana	Strawberry Stadium; Hammond, LA	L 14–38	2,500	
November 21	Louisiana Tech	Crump Stadium; Memphis, TN	L 7–33		
