= 1942 Tampa Spartans football team =

American college football season

1942 Tampa Spartans football
- Conference: Independent
- Record: 5–5
- Head coach: Melvin Vines (1st season)
- Home stadium: Phillips Field

1942 Southern college football independents records
| | Conf. | | | Overall |
| Team | W | L | T | W | | L | | T |
|---|---|---|---|---|---|---|---|---|
| Louisiana Normal (Grambling) | | – | | 9 | – | 0 | – | 0 |
| Delaware | | – | | 8 | – | 0 | – | 0 |
| Mississippi Southern | | – | | 4 | – | 0 | – | 0 |
| Sewanee | | – | | 1 | – | 0 | – | 0 |
| Miami (FL) | | – | | 7 | – | 2 | – | 0 |
| Delaware State | | – | | 3 | – | 1 | – | 1 |
| Middle Tennessee State Teachers | | – | | 4 | – | 2 | – | 1 |
| Chattanooga | | – | | 7 | – | 4 | – | 0 |
| Georgetown | | – | | 5 | – | 3 | – | 1 |
| Navy | | – | | 5 | – | 4 | – | 0 |
| West Virginia | | – | | 5 | – | 4 | – | 0 |
| Western Maryland | | – | | 4 | – | 4 | – | 1 |
| Tennessee Tech | | – | | 3 | – | 4 | – | 2 |
| Virginia | | – | | 2 | – | 6 | – | 1 |
| Roanoke | | – | | 1 | – | 5 | – | 1 |

The 1942 Tampa Spartans football team represented the University of Tampa as an independent during the 1942 college football season. Led by Melvin Vines in his first season as head coach, the Spartans compiled an overall record of 5–5. The team played home games at Phillips Field in Tampa, Florida.

Tampa was ranked at No. 264 (out of 590 college and military teams) in the final rankings under the Litkenhous Difference by Score System for 1942.

== Schedule ==
| Date | Opponent | Site | Result | Attendance | Source |
|---|---|---|---|---|---|
| October 3 | Florida | Phillips Field; Tampa, FL | L 6–26 | 6,500 | |
| October 10 | at Miami (FL) | Burdine Stadium; Miami, FL | L 6–65 | 8,860 | |
| October 17 | Troy State | Phillips Field; Tampa, FL | W 27–0 | | |
| October 25 | at Jacksonville NAS | Mason Field; Jacksonville, FL | L 0–26 | 3,500 | |
| October 31 | Middle Tennessee State Teachers | Phillips Field; Tampa, FL | W 13–0 | 1,000 | |
| November 7 | Drew Field | Phillips Field; Tampa, FL | W 21–13 | 7,000 | |
| November 14 | Rollins^{†} | Phillips Field; Tampa, FL | L 0–48 | 5,000 | |
| November 21 | Presbyterian | Phillips Field; Tampa, FL | L 7–41 | 1,500 | |
| November 28 | Fort Benning | Phillips Field; Tampa, FL | W 30–0 | > 1,000 | |
| December 12 | Drew Field | Phillips Field; Tampa, FL | W 45–0 | | |
^{†}Homecoming
