= Jamal Woods =

American football player (born 1999)

Profile
- Position: Defensive tackle

Personal information
- Born: June 14, 1999 (age 27); Hueytown, Alabama, U.S.
- Listed height: 6 ft 2 in (1.88 m)
- Listed weight: 290 lb (132 kg)

Career information
- High school: Hueytown
- College: Illinois (2017–2022)
- NFL draft: 2023: undrafted

Career history
- Indianapolis Colts (2023)*; Miami Dolphins (2023)*; Winnipeg Blue Bombers (2024–2025)
- * Offseason or practice squad member only
- Stats at CFL.ca

Jamal Woods (born June 14, 1999) is an American professional football defensive tackle. He most recently played for the Winnipeg Blue Bombers of the Canadian Football League (CFL). He played college football at Illinois. He has also been a member of the Indianapolis Colts and Miami Dolphins of the National Football League (NFL).

== Early life ==
Woods was born in Hueytown, Alabama and played high school football at Hueytown High School. He totaled 47 tackles, two sacks, and one forced fumble his senior year. He also participated in wrestling in high school.

== College career ==
Woods played college football for the Illinois Fighting Illini from 2017 to 2022.

He played in 11 games, starting four, his freshman year in 2017, and made 24 tackles while earning BTN.com honorable mention All-Freshman honors. He appeared in four games, all starts, during the 2018 season, recording 13 tackles, one sack, and three pass breakups before suffering a season-ending injury. He was named honorable mention All-Big Ten by the media that season. Woods played in nine games, starting four, in 2019, accumulating 14 tackles, 0.5 sacks, and one forced fumble. He appeared in four games, starting three, during the COVID-19-shortened 2020 season, recording four tackles. He also missed four games due to injury in 2020. Woods played in 10 games, starting one, in 2021, totaling 12 tackles. He appeared in 11 games, starting two, during his sixth season of college football in 2022, and made 11 tackles.

Woods recorded career totals of 78 tackles, 1.5 sacks, one forced fumble, and three pass breakups. In December 2021, he graduated with a bachelor's in community health.

== Professional career ==
Pre-draft measurables
Height	Weight	Arm length	Hand span	40-yard dash	10-yard split	20-yard split	20-yard shuttle	Three-cone drill	Vertical jump	Broad jump	Bench press
6 ft 0 3/5 in (1.84 m)	294 lb (133 kg)	32 3/8 in (0.82 m)	10 1/8 in (0.26 m)	4.96 s	1.62 s	2.90 s	4.56 s	7.48 s	30 in (0.76 m)	9 ft 3 in (2.82 m)	27 reps
All values from Pro Day

After going undrafted in the 2023 NFL draft, Woods signed with the Indianapolis Colts of the National Football League (NFL) on May 8, 2023. He was waived on August 1, 2023.

Woods was signed by the Miami Dolphins of the NFL on August 25, 2023. He was waived three days later on August 28, 2023.

Woods signed a futures contract with the Winnipeg Blue Bombers of the Canadian Football League (CFL) on October 29, 2023. He was moved to the practice roster on June 12, 2024, and promoted to the active roster three days later on June 15. He made his CFL debut, and first start, on June 21 as an injury-replacement for Miles Fox. Woods became a free agent when his contract expired on February 10, 2026.
