= Deon Lacey =

American football player (born 1990)

No. 44, 40
- Position: Linebacker

Personal information
- Born: July 18, 1990 (age 36); Indianapolis, Indiana, U.S.
- Listed height: 6 ft 2 in (1.88 m)
- Listed weight: 229 lb (104 kg)

Career information
- High school: Hueytown (Hueytown, Alabama)
- College: West Alabama (2008–2012)
- NFL draft: 2013: undrafted

Career history
- Dallas Cowboys (2013)*; Edmonton Eskimos (2014–2016); Miami Dolphins (2017)*; Buffalo Bills (2017–2018); Miami Dolphins (2019); Saskatchewan Roughriders (2020)*; Buffalo Bills (2020); Saskatchewan Roughriders (2021); Edmonton Elks (2022)
- * Offseason or practice squad member only

Awards and highlights
- Grey Cup champion (2015); CFL West All-Star (2014); GSC Defensive Player of the Year (2011)

Career NFL statistics
- Total tackles: 22
- Stats at Pro Football Reference
- Stats at CFL.ca

Deon L. Lacey (born July 18, 1990) is an American former professional football player who was a linebacker in the National Football League (NFL) and Canadian Football League (CFL). He played college football for the West Alabama Tigers. He was a member of the Dallas Cowboys, Edmonton Eskimos / Elks, Miami Dolphins, Buffalo Bills, and Saskatchewan Roughriders.

== Early life ==
Lacey was born on July 18, 1990, in Indianapolis, Indiana. He lettered in football and track and field at Hueytown High School in Hueytown, Alabama. He was named All-state, Super All-Metro, Old Spice Player of the Year, and Defensive Player of the Year while playing for the Golden Gophers football team. He also set the school record in the 400 metres with a time of 52.57.

== College career ==
Lacey played football for the Tigers at the University of West Alabama from 2008 to 2012. He was named the Gulf South Conference Defensive Player of the Year in 2011, recording 97 tackles, nine tackles for loss, four sacks, two interceptions, four pass deflections, and a fumble recovery. He finished his college career with 267 tackles, nine sacks, six forced fumbles and five interceptions.

== Professional career ==
=== Dallas Cowboys ===
Lacey was signed by the Dallas Cowboys of the NFL on April 28, 2013, after going undrafted in the 2013 NFL draft. Lacey played in three preseason games for the Cowboys, contributing with five tackles. He was released by the Cowboys on August 27, 2013.

=== Edmonton Eskimos ===
LAcey signed with the Edmonton Eskimos of the Canadian Football League (CFL) on February 26, 2014. Lacey made an immediate impact with the Eskimos on special teams and increasingly became an important member of their starting defensive unit. In three years with the Eskimos, Lacey played in all 54 games, racking up 144 defensive tackles, 68 special teams tackles, 7 sacks, 3 interceptions, 4 forced fumbles and 1 touchdown.

In December 2016, Lacey had workouts with various NFL teams, including; the Minnesota Vikings, New England Patriots, Detroit Lions, Denver Broncos, Green Bay Packers, Kansas City Chiefs, and Cincinnati Bengals. On January 3, 2017, the Eskimos granted Lacey an early release so he would be eligible to sign with an NFL team.

=== Miami Dolphins (first stint) ===
On January 10, 2017, Lacey signed a reserve/future contract with the Miami Dolphins. He was waived on September 2, 2017.

=== Buffalo Bills (first stint) ===
On September 3, 2017, Lacey was claimed off waivers by the Buffalo Bills. He was waived by the Bills on October 18, 2017, but was re-signed the next day. He finished the 2017 season having contributed nine tackles. In the following off-season, on February 20, 2019, Lacey signed a one-year contract extension with the Bills. Lacey appeared in all four preseason games in 2019, and totaled 18 tackles. He was released during final roster cuts on August 31, 2019.

=== Miami Dolphins (second stint) ===
On September 1, 2019, Lacey was claimed off waivers by the Dolphins.

=== Saskatchewan Roughriders (first stint) ===
Lacey signed with the Saskatchewan Roughriders of the CFL on May 21, 2020. After the CFL canceled the 2020 season due to the COVID-19 pandemic, Lacey chose to opt-out of his contract with the Roughriders on August 25, 2020.

=== Buffalo Bills (second stint) ===
On September 17, 2020, Lacey was signed to the Bills practice squad. He was elevated to the active roster on September 19 for the team's week 2 game against the Dolphins, and reverted to the practice squad after the game. He was elevated again on September 26 for the team's week 3 game against the Los Angeles Rams, and reverted to the practice squad again following the game. He was promoted to the active roster on October 12, 2020. He was waived on October 27 and re-signed to the practice squad the next day. He was released on January 1, 2021.

=== Saskatchewan Roughriders (second stint) ===
Lacey re-signed with the Roughriders on June 15, 2021.

=== Edmonton Elks ===
Lacey returned to the Edmonton Elks in free agency on February 8, 2022.
