= Butch Wilson =

American football player (1941–2026)

No. 86
- Position: Tight end

Personal information
- Born: September 18, 1941; Birmingham, Alabama, U.S.
- Died: April 3, 2026 (aged 84); McCalla, Alabama, U.S.
- Listed height: 6 ft 2 in (1.88 m)
- Listed weight: 228 lb (103 kg)

Career information
- High school: Hueytown (Hueytown, Alabama)
- College: Alabama (1959–1962)
- NFL draft: 1963: 2nd round, 24th overall pick
- AFL draft: 1963: 6th round, 41st overall pick

Career history
- Baltimore Colts (1963–1967); New York Giants (1968–1969)

Awards and highlights
- National champion (1961); Jacobs Blocking Trophy (1962)

Career NFL statistics
- Receptions: 25
- Receiving yards: 317
- Touchdowns: 3
- Stats at Pro Football Reference

George Marvin "Butch" Wilson III (September 18, 1941 – April 3, 2026) was an American professional football player who was a tight end for seven seasons for the Baltimore Colts and New York Giants of the National Football League (NFL). He played college football for the Alabama Crimson Tide.

== College career ==
Wilson played both offense and defense at the University of Alabama, leading the Crimson Tide in receptions in 1960 and sharing the team lead in interceptions for three straight seasons from 1960-62. Wilson won a national championship with Alabama in 1961 (the first of legendary coach Paul "Bear" Bryant's six with the school). Wilson intercepted a pass near the goal line in the 1962 Sugar Bowl to help seal Alabama's 10-3 victory and the championship.

== Professional career ==
Wilson was picked by both the NFL's Baltimore Colts and AFL's Oakland Raiders in the leagues' 1963 drafts, but opted to sign with Baltimore. He spent five seasons with the Colts, playing tight end behind All-Pro John Mackey and being used primarily as a blocking back and on special teams.

He was traded to the New York Giants prior to the 1968 season and played two seasons for the Giants before retiring after the 1969 season.

Over eight pro seasons, Wilson caught 25 passes for 317 receiving yards and three touchdowns.

== Personal life and death ==
After his playing career, Wilson owned a small chain of sporting good stores in Alabama.

Wilson's son, George, played offensive line for Alabama, starting on the 1992 national championship team.

Butch Wilson died from cancer on April 3, 2026, at the age of 84.
