= Russ Davis =

American baseball player (born 1969)

- Third baseman
- Born: September 13, 1969 (age 56); Birmingham, Alabama, U.S.
- Batted: Right Threw: Right

MLB debut
- July 6, 1994, for the New York Yankees

Last MLB appearance
- June 14, 2001, for the San Francisco Giants

MLB statistics
- Batting average: .257
- Home runs: 84
- Runs batted in: 276
- Stats at Baseball Reference

Teams
- New York Yankees (1994–1995); Seattle Mariners (1996–1999); San Francisco Giants (2000–2001)

Russell Stuart Davis (born September 13, 1969) is an American former professional baseball third baseman who played in Major League Baseball for the New York Yankees, Seattle Mariners, and San Francisco Giants from 1994 to 2001.

== Career ==
Davis attended Hueytown High School in Hueytown, Alabama, graduating in 1987. He played for the school's baseball team as a shortstop, but did not receive much interest from Major League Baseball (MLB) teams because he weighed 160 pounds (73 kg). He enrolled at Shelton State Community College. Playing as a shortstop for Shelton State's college baseball team in 1988, Davis had a .347 batting average with 14 home runs and 46 runs batted in (RBIs). He also gained weight, reaching 195 pounds (88 kg). The New York Yankees selected Davis in the 29th round of the 1988 MLB draft. He signed with the Yankees and reported to the Gulf Coast Yankees.

In Minor League Baseball, Davis became a third baseman. He batted .285 with 22 home runs and 71 RBIs for the Albany-Colonie Yankees of the Class AA Eastern League in the 1992 season, and was subsequently named the league's most valuable player. However, Davis was blocked at third base with the Yankees by Wade Boggs. He spent the 1993 season and most of the 1994 season with the Columbus Clippers of the Class AAA International League. He made his major league debut in July 1994, but spent one week with the Yankees before returning to Columbus. Davis began the 1995 season with Columbus, but played for the Yankees from May 6 to 27, and was called up again on June 12. He hit his first major league home run against David Wells on June 28, 1995. In December 1995, the Yankees traded Davis and Sterling Hitchcock to the Seattle Mariners for Tino Martinez, Jeff Nelson, and Jim Mecir. On June 7, 1996, Davis broke his leg, ending his season. In 1997, Davis batted .271 with 20 home runs and 63 RBIs in 119 total games. In 1998, Davis set a Mariners franchise record for errors committed. He led the American League with 34 errors. He also hit 20 home runs with 82 RBIs in 141 games. On July 17, 1999, Davis hit the first ever home run at Safeco Field. For the 1999 season, Davis batted .245 with 21 home runs and 59 RBIs in 124 games, while committing only 12 errors.

Davis became a free agent after the 1999 season, and the Mariners opted not to offer Davis a new contract. The San Francisco Giants signed Davis to a minor league contract in January 2000. Davis was a backup to third baseman Bill Mueller and first baseman J. T. Snow for the Giants during the 2000 season. The Giants traded Mueller to the Chicago Cubs after the 2000 season and re-signed Davis. He started the 2001 season as the Giants' starting third baseman, with Pedro Feliz backing him up. Davis struggled in 2001, and was designated for assignment in June.

== Personal life ==
Davis met his wife, Adryne, while they attended high school. They married on December 30, 1993, and had three children. Adryne died in 2012 from leukemia. Davis' father played in Minor League Baseball for the Baltimore Orioles organization.
