= Elwin W. Midgett =

American sports coach and professor

Biographical details
- Born: December 31, 1911; Watertown, Tennessee, U.S.
- Died: November 22, 1993 (aged 81); Murfreesboro, Tennessee, U.S.

Playing career

Football
- 1930–1933: Tennessee Tech

Basketball
- 1930–1934: Tennessee Tech

Baseball
- 1931–1934: Tennessee Tech

Coaching career (HC unless noted)

Football
- 1940–1946: Middle Tennessee

Basketball
- 1939–1942: Middle Tennessee

Head coaching record
- Overall: 18–11–3 (football); 25–35 (basketball)

Elwin Wilburn "Wink" Midgett (December 31, 1911 – November 22, 1993) was an American college football and college basketball coach and an accounting professor. He served as the head football coach at Middle Tennessee State University from 1940 to 1946, compiling a record of 18–11–3. Midgett was also the head basketball coach at Middle Tennessee from 1939 to 1942, tallying a mark of 25–35. He was also a professor of accounting at the school.

Midgett was a standout three-sport athlete at Tennessee Technological University in Cookeville, Tennessee. He was born on December 31, 1911, in Watertown, Tennessee, to Edel Wilburn and Mattie Ellis Midgett. He died on November 22, 1993, at his home in Murfreesboro, Tennessee.

== Head coaching record ==
=== Football ===
Year	Team	Overall	Conference	Standing	Bowl/playoffs
Middle Tennessee State Teachers Blue Raiders (Southern Intercollegiate Athletic Association) (1940–1941)
1940	Middle Tennessee State Teachers	4–4	2–4	T–19th	
1941	Middle Tennessee State Teachers	4–3–1	2–3–1	T–19th	
Middle Tennessee State Teachers / Middle Tennessee Blue Raiders (Independent) (1942–1946)
1942	Middle Tennessee State Teachers	4–2–1			
1943	No team—World War II				
1944	No team—World War II				
1945	No team—World War II				
1946	Middle Tennessee	6–2–1			
Middle Tennessee State Teachers / Middle Tennessee:		18–11–3	4–7–1		
Total:		18–11–3			
