= Hueytown High School =

Coordinates: 33.4464977°N 86.9919381°W

Location
- 4881 15th Street Road; Hueytown, Alabama 35023; United States

Information
- Motto: Honor, hard work, success
- Established: 1921 (105 years ago)
- School district: Jefferson County Schools
- CEEB code: 011463
- Principal: Ryan Howard
- Teaching staff: 69.00 (FTE)
- Grades: 9-12
- Enrollment: 1,171 (2023-2024)
- Student to teacher ratio: 16.97
- Colors: Purple and gold
- Athletics: AHSAA Class 6A
- Mascot: Golden Gophers
- Feeder schools: Hueytown Middle School
- Website: www.jefcoed.com/hueytownhs

Hueytown High School is a four-year public high school in the Birmingham, Alabama suburb of Hueytown. It is one of fourteen high schools in the Jefferson County School System. Hueytown competes in AHSAA Class 6A athletics.

== Student profile ==
Enrollment in grades 9-12 for the 2013-14 school year is 1,113 students. Approximately 51% are white, 43% are African-American, 4% are Hispanic, and 2% are multiracial. Roughly 52% of students qualify for free or reduced-price lunch.

Hueytown has a graduation rate of 88%. Approximately 89% of its students meet or exceed state proficiency standards in mathematics, and 85% meet or exceed standards in reading. The average ACT score for Hueytown students is 22.

== History ==
The first Hueytown High School began classes on February 25, 1921, with students who had transferred from Bessemer High School. The creation of the high school was long championed by W. R. Copeland, who had for many years been Principal of Hueytown Grammar School and later an Assistant Superintendent of Education for the Jefferson County School System. Hueytown High would be one of six new high schools (along with Powderly, Jones Valley, West Jefferson, Warrior, and Mortimer Jordan) in the Jefferson County system around that time. Minor High School followed in 1922. That first Hueytown High School had an enrollment of just 66 students with 25 seniors in the first graduating class that followed in 1922. Mr. Harley F. Gilmore was named the first principal and athletic director by the school board on May 6, 1920, nine months before the first classes began. He was paid an initial annual salary of $2,400. He would serve as principal from 1920 until his retirement in 1956. His thirty-six-year tenure as principal is the longest in school history. He was commonly referred to as "Professor Gilmore" and the school's original football stadium (built in 1933) was named in his honor. Before his being named Principal, he had been the Superintendent of the Athens City School System. Only six teachers served on the original staff with Mr. Gilmore.

Subjects available in those early years included French, Latin, chemistry, mathematics, and history. Home economics was offered for girls and manual arts (woodworking) for the boys.

In 1957, enrollment had reached 1,273. From 1921 through 1958, the school operated with grades 9-12. The next year when the school relocated to its Dabbs Avenue campus, it served only grades 10-12. The old building then became Pittman Junior High School (serving grades 7-9) and continued in that capacity until May 1970. The school continued to be only Sophomore through Senior classes until the fall of 1991 when the Freshmen class (9th grade) was transferred from Pittman Jr. High School and the school has remained four grades since.

Principals	Years of service
Harley F. Gilmore*	1920 - 1956
Charles C. Vines* (1)	1957 - 1962
Louis F. Marty*	1962 - 1975
Pat A. Salamone	1975 - 1979
Haywood L. Atkinson*	1979 - 1992
B. Kaye Reach	1992 - 1995
John O. Hudson*	1995 - 1998
Mary Kay (Pearson) Lindsey (1)	1998 - 2001
Judson L. Jones (1)	2001 - 2006
Randy H. McCarty	2006 - 2009
Gayle Gober	2009 – 2015
Joseph Garner	2015–2020
Ryan Howard	2020–Present

(1) Denotes school principals who are Hueytown High School graduates.
Asterisk (*) denotes the individual is deceased.

== Campus ==
There have been three different campuses for Hueytown High School over the school's existence.

The first campus initially was just a single building—a white-stucco-covered brick and wood structure located on the southeast corner of present-day Allison-Bonnett Drive and High School Road. It was designed by David O. Whilldin, chosen as architect on March 11, 1920, and the construction contract for the original building was awarded to the Miller Brothers for $43,450. Only the flagpole, a few concrete sidewalk remnants that led to the front entrance, and a historic marker erected by the Hueytown Historical Society on July 19, 2009, note the location of the original school.

Nine months after opening, on November 13, 1921, the school Trustees (D. T. Foust, J. B. Thomas, and S. E. Huey) asked the school board to add two to four new classrooms. Later on, two four-room annex buildings located on either side of the main building were added. A fire would destroy the second-floor science rooms of the main building in the late 1930s. An auditorium/gymnasium with a theatrical stage attached to the back of the original building was added about 1940, and additional classrooms were built under the grandstand of the football stadium. The boys' shop was erected sometime before 1953, standing behind the auditorium. Both the annex buildings and the boys' shop would be demolished by the late 1960s—the stadium grandstand, an empty one-story red brick building used for classrooms (built in 1949), and a parking lot between them are all that remain on the site.

After the high school (only grades 10-12) was relocated to the new Dabbs Avenue campus, the old school building was renamed W. I. Pittman Junior High School (grades 7-9) in honor of a former member of the Jefferson County School Board. The original school building served in that capacity for another 14 years until mid-1970 when a new Pittman Jr. High was constructed to replace the original building. During the time that the old building served as Pittman Jr. High, it had two principals. The first was Mr. Dwight M. Riley (1958-1968), a Hueytown High alumni from 1922, then succeeded by Mr. Richard H. Farrar Sr. (1968-1970) who served many more years at the "new" Pittman school. This original campus would later be demolished in 1972, two years after the new Junior High campus was completed on Sunrise Boulevard.

The second campus of Hueytown High was at 131 Dabbs Avenue in Hueytown. The construction contract for that campus was signed on April 26, 1957 and the school opened in the fall of 1958. Designed by architect Charles F. Davis of Van Keuren, Davis & Company of Birmingham, it featured multiple one-story buildings scattered over several acres on heavily timbered property. One was named Main—with administrative offices, a band room, a choir room, an art room, and a gymnasium. This building also contained the kitchen, lunchroom, and a performance stage. The campus also had an all-steel and glass library building, and two buildings named Oak, and Ivy. Around 1965, a third building was added and named Pine which was also designed by Charles F. Davis. In 1976, a second gymnasium with a performance stage was added as well as new band and choir rooms. The last building added to the campus was named Elm and built around 2001, located between Oak, and Ivy.

The campus ceased to serve as the high school when the final class graduated in May 2011. The Elm building would later house a Day Care Center and some of the other campus buildings were utilized by Hueytown Alternative School (for adult classes). The entire campus was eventually abandoned and demolished in October and November 2018, and the property was also cleared of all its trees. In the spring of 2019, site prep aration began for a new school on the site of the second Hueytown High School, eventually becoming Hueytown Primary School (grades K-2) and is expected to open in late 2021 or early 2022. It replaces its predecessor on Forest Road which was Hueytown Elementary School. Only the brick Athletic Field House (built in the late 1960s) is all that remains of the old second campus. Both are located across Forest Road next to the athletic fields which are still in use by the community.

The third and present Hueytown High School began classes on August 15, 2011. Groundbreaking ceremonies were held on October 7, 2009, for this new campus with construction beginning almost immediately. The school was designed by Lathan Associates, and constructed on a 109-acre (0.44 km^{2}) parcel of land costing 1.58 million dollars. It is located off of 15th Street Road. The new brick and aluminum facility contains over 287,103 square feet (26,672.7 m^{2}) at a construction cost of 37.2 million dollars. The two-story facility consists of fifty-six classrooms, five science labs, a media center, a dining hall for 384, administrative offices, band and choral rooms, and a cosmetology lab. Recreational facilities include an auditorium and a 1,650-person competition gym. An additional 6.4 million dollars was paid for the construction of a new football stadium in which the Gophers played their first game in the fall of 2012. The new stadium replaced the more-than-70-year-old Gilmore-Vines stadium. Gilmore-Vines Stadium saw its final Golden Gopher football game on November 25, 2011. Also, new baseball, and softball fields, plus two practice fields for use by soccer and the marching band were built at the new school. In recognition of the 1958 campus, the hallways in the new school are named Main, Oak, Ivy, Pine, and Elm after those earlier buildings. Those same halls are adorned with huge collage photo murals featuring images of students, teachers, and school activities from the many years of the school's history.

== Athletic history ==
Today the school's athletic/sports teams, known as the Hueytown Golden Gophers, compete in baseball, basketball, bowling, cheer, cross-country, fishing, football, golf, softball, tennis, track & field, soccer, volleyball, and wrestling.

On September 30, 1921, the as-yet-unnamed "Golden Gophers" played the school's first-ever football game by visiting Jefferson County High School (present day Tarrant High). The next week the team played its first-ever home game against Alliance High School and won 9-0. They would complete that inaugural season with a record of 3-4, including a loss to the Howard College Grass Cutters (Now Samford University). Their "head coach" that first year was the school Principal, Mr. Gilmore who was the only male teacher on the staff.

That same season the boys' baseball team posted a 10-3 record. Hueytown's first girls' basketball was also in 1921 and finished with a record of 4-1. Since then the girl's teams had their best back-to-back seasons in 2000-01 and 2001-02 when they were Area Champs both seasons and posted a record of 49-13.

During the next six years after that inaugural football season, the team would post a record of 28-16-5, including the 1924 team (7-1-1) which outscored opponents by the margin of 256-38. The 1924 squad had four shutouts and a victory over St. Bernard College of Cullman.

The Gophers' most successful football period occurred from 1948 to 1962, when Melvin Vines (who played on the 1925 & 1926 University of Alabama Rose Bowl teams) coached Gopher teams to an aggregate record of 78-44-9. His most successful team was the 1958 unit (10-0), the first undefeated and untied team in school history. The team recorded eight shutouts and outscored opponents 253-26, and it won the Jefferson County Championship (The Dental Clinic Classic) over Fairfield High School that same year by a score of 7-0. Vines' teams won five county championships at a time when no statewide playoff system existed. The Gophers won another County Championship in the Dental Clinic Classic in 1967 defeating Minor High School 14-6.

From the beginning of the program through the 2021 season, the Golden Gophers football team has amassed a record of 519-442-32. This makes the Gophers one of the top five winningest programs among all high schools in Jefferson County history. While the team has many traditional rivals, there are only four schools where they have played at least fifty times. They have most often faced Minor High School with 85 matches on the gridiron. Hueytown posts a record of 48-34-3 in the series through 2021 with Minor. The two schools first met in 1923 with the Golden Gophers winning 82-0 in what is still the most lop-sided game in the history of the school. The second most contests have been the 77 games with Bessemer High School whom Hueytown first played in 1922 initially on an irregular basis. The first win against Bessemer would come in their ninth meeting in the final game of the season on November 30, 1939. Hueytown defeated Bessemer with a lone field goal 3-0 under the guidance of Head Coach John Henry Suther. It was their fifth shutout of the season. The most recent game against Bessemer in 2021 resulted in a 57-6 Gopher win, the most one-sided Hueytown victory in the history of the series. The third most common opponent is Shades Valley High School (which before 1949 was Shades Cahaba High School). The Mounties and the Gophers have now played 66 times. Hueytown leads the combined series 32-31-3. However, the record when the school was Shades Cahaba was 16-5-1, and since it became Shades Valley the record is 16-26-2. In 1949, Hueytown defeated Shades Valley in the Dental Clinic Classic, the only game they faced against each other for the Jefferson County Championship with the Gophers winning by a score of 34-14. The fourth most common rival was Jones Valley High School, which ceased to exist as a high school after the 1988-1989 season. The two schools first met in 1921, the inaugural season for both schools. Hueytown won that first game by a score of 61-0. They would play every year thereafter (except 1965-67) through the 1973 season when they met for the last time with Hueytown victorious 24-6. Hueytown led the now-defunct series 28-19-3.

The Golden Gophers football team played their inaugural game in their new on-campus stadium on August 30, 2012, defeating Pell City High School 35-34. They would finish that regular season with a record of 6-4.

The Head Football Coach beginning in 2019 is Greg Patterson.

Listed below are the head football coaches in school history who had winning records that included at least 10 wins.

Head football coach	Won/loss record	Pct. won	Best W/L (year)	Years coached
Melvin Vines	77-44-10	.625	10-0 (1959)	1948-1962
Morris Higginbotham	38-36-4	.512	7-1-1 (1963)	1963-66, 1978–81
John Galloway	36-34	.514	7-3 (1988)	1986-1992
Matt Scott	35-13	.729	13-1 (2011)	2009-2012
Jeff Smith	35-31	.530	10-3 (2007)	2003-2008
John Henry Suther	31-13	.704	8-1 (1939, 1941)	1937-1941
Rufus Shelton	30-12-3	.714	6-2-1 (1933)	1932-1936
Greg Patterson	29-10	.743	13-2 (2021)	2019-present
Scott Mansell	29-25	.537	9-3 (2018)	2014-2018
Ralph "Fats" Snider	21-10-4	.657	7-1-1 (1924)	1922-1925
Mike Battles Sr.	19-15	.558	9-5 (1995)	1993-1995
Danny Salmon	17-14-1	.546	6-4 (1977)	1975-1977
Charles "Buddy" Hearn	11-10	.523	8-3 (1974)	1973-1974

In 1974, the Hueytown High wrestling team won the school's first AHSAA Championship with the 4A State Title under the guidance of then head-wrestling coach, George A. "Tony" Morton.

The boys' baseball team has traditionally been among the state's top programs including an AHSAA 4A Championship in 1976. Hueytown's first-ever baseball game was in 1921 with a 9-4 victory over Oak Grove High School. On February 25, 2021, the 100th Anniversary of the school, the baseball field was named "Rick Patterson Field," after the school's long-time baseball coach who unexpectedly died on September 29, 2020.

The girls' softball team has won four AHSAA state championships in six years with titles in 2005, 2006, and 2008 as a 6A school and 2010 as a 5A school.

The boys' basketball team has on six occasions been Area Champs in 1978, 1982, 1984, 1987, 1998, and 2018.

The 1992 Majorettes won the 4A State Championship in twirling.

Over the years some athletic competitive sports/competitions have "come and gone" for a variety of reasons. No longer do the school field teams as they once did in Archery, Boxing, and Tumbling (Gymnastics).

=== The Golden Gopher nickname ===
Many different stories have been suggested as to how Hueytown's athletic teams acquired the rare nickname that only two other high schools (Ridgemont High of Ohio; Pavilion High of New York) and one university share according to MascotDB.com. Most often, it is said to be linked somehow to the National Championship football teams of the Minnesota Golden Gophers in 1934, 1935, and 1936. However, this alone cannot be the reason since the Hueytown High yearbook, "The Retrospect" first mentions the football team nickname 11 years earlier in 1923 as the "Gophers.". The same yearbook also mentions the school colors as "Purple and Gold" and refers to the girls basketball team as "The Gopherettes" While these references do not eliminate the University of Minnesota as being the inspiration since they have played football with that nickname since 1882, some other rationale must be the answer. It is also sometimes generally stated that Hueytown's first full-time football coach, Ralph "Fats" Snider was a Minnesota graduate, however, The Retrospect also states that Coach Snider played "center" for Auburn University, so neither is that the inspiration.

== Notable alumni ==
Name	Grad Class	Category	Best Known For
Wilson Daniel "Dee" Miles	1928	Baseball Player	Played seven years in MLB (503 games) with the Washington Senators, Philadelphia A's, and Boston Red Sox.
R. G. Armstrong	1935	Actor	Movie and TV character actor often featured in Westerns.
George M. Murray	1936?	Bishop	Prominent theologian and Bishop of the Episcopal Church.
John Thurman "Red" Cochran Jr.	1940?	NFL Player & Coach	NFL player (Chicago Cardinals, 1947–1950); assistant coach for Green Bay Packers and other teams; inducted into Green Bay Packers Hall of Fame (1997).
Frank House	1949	Baseball Player	Played 10 years in MLB (653 games) with the Detroit Tigers, Kansas City Athletics, and Cincinnati Reds; Alabama House of Representatives (1966–1970); Alabama Sports Hall of Fame (1975).
Joseph Edwin Johnson	1951	Academic	President, University of Tennessee (1990–1999); President Emeritus of UT.
Richard Shelby	1953	Politician	U.S. Senator (1987–2023); U.S. Representative (1979–1987); Alabama State Senator (1971–1979).
James I. "Spider" Martin	1958	Photographer	Prominent news photographer known for documenting the civil rights movement.
George M. "Butch" Wilson	1959	Football Player	Former NFL player (Baltimore Colts, New York Giants).
Tom Hardy	1964	Designer	Corporate head of the IBM Design Program; instrumental in developing the original IBM Personal Computer (1981) and the first IBM ThinkPad (1992).
William L. Roper	1966	Health Official	Director of Centers for Disease Control and Prevention (1990–1993); CEO of UNC Health Care; Dean of the University of North Carolina School of Medicine.
Emmit King	1978	Athlete	1983 NCAA National Champion sprinter (100 meters); bronze medalist at the 1983 World Championships.
Davey Allison	1979	NASCAR Driver	Named one of NASCAR's 50 Greatest Drivers; 1987 NASCAR Winston Cup Series Rookie of the Year; winner of major races including Daytona 500, Coca-Cola 600, and Winston 500.
Russ Davis	1987	Baseball Player	Played 569 games in MLB with the New York Yankees, Seattle Mariners, and San Francisco Giants.
Jeremy Brown	1998	Baseball Player	Played college baseball at the University of Alabama; former Major League Baseball player, Oakland Athletics (2006).
Deon Lacey	2008	Football Player	Professional football player (Edmonton Eskimos, Miami Dolphins, Buffalo Bills); holds Hueytown High School record for 400 meters.
Wes Saxton	2011	Football Player	Professional football player; New Jersey Generals player (2022–present).
Jameis Winston	2012	Football Player	2013 Heisman Trophy winner; NFL quarterback.
Jamal Woods	2017	Football Player	CFL defensive tackle for the Winnipeg Blue Bombers.
Roydell Williams	2020	Football Player	College football player.
