= Buddy Hackman =

American football player (1906–1987)

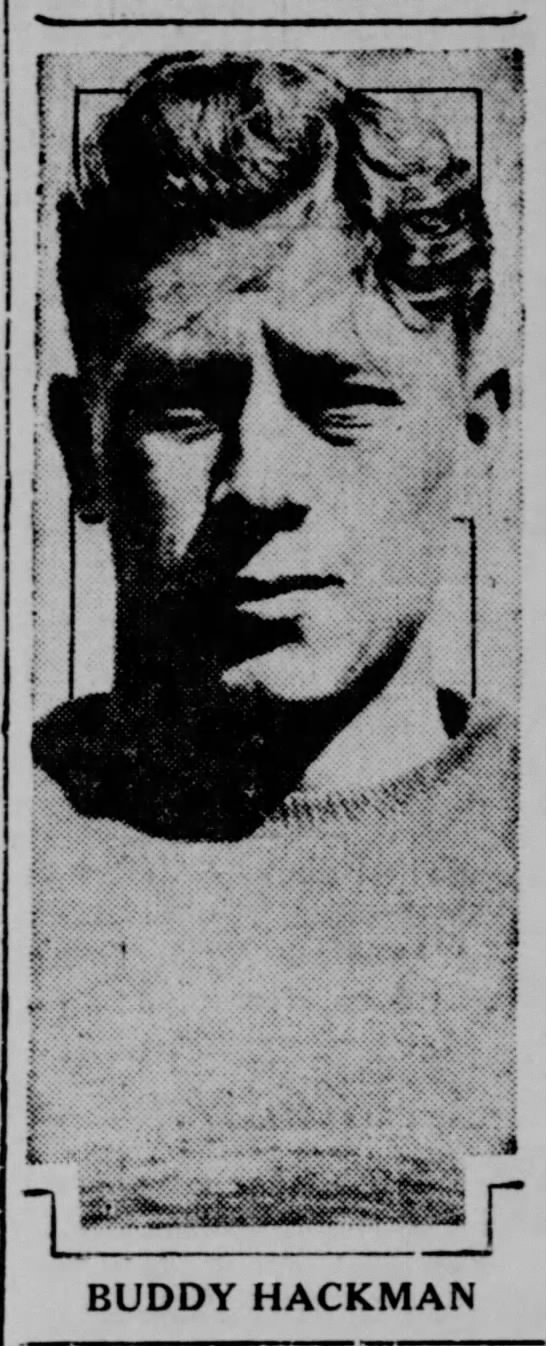

Biographical details
- Born: February 6, 1906; Nashville, Tennessee, U.S.
- Died: June 25, 1987 (aged 81); Roanoke, Virginia, U.S.

Playing career

Football
- 1928–1930: Tennessee
- Position: Halfback

Coaching career (HC unless noted)

Football
- 1931–1933: Lakeland HS (FL)
- 1934: Greeneville HS (TN)
- 1935–1941: Roanoke (backfield)
- 1942: Roanoke

Basketball
- 1942–1967: Roanoke

Head coaching record
- Overall: 1–5–1 (college football); 252–207 (college basketball)

Accomplishments and honors

Awards
- 2× All-Southern (1929, 1930); Tennessee Sports Hall of Fame (1974)

Joseph Sandy "Buddy" Hackman (February 6, 1906 – June 25, 1987) was an American football player and coach of football and basketball.

== Playing years ==
Hackman c. 1933

Hackman was a halfback for the Tennessee Volunteers of the University of Tennessee from 1928 to 1930. He was part of Robert Neyland's first great backfield along with future All-Americans Gene McEver and Bobby Dodd. Hackman stood 5'11" and weighed 175 pounds. Hackman and McEver were sometimes called "Hack and Mack." McEver missed the entire 1930 season with torn ligaments in his knee. Hackman filled his role and made the All-Southern team. He was inducted into the Tennessee Sports Hall of Fame in 1974. Hackman wore number 15.

== Coaching years ==
He coached the Roanoke College Maroons in basketball and baseball starting in 1936 and continuing to do so for nearly 35 years.

== Head coaching record ==
=== College football ===
Year	Team	Overall	Conference	Standing	Bowl/playoffs
Roanoke Maroons (Independent) (1942)
1942	Roanoke	1–5–1			
Roanoke:		1–5–1			
Total:		1–5–1			
