= 1942 Alcorn A&M Braves football team =

American college football season

1942 Alcorn A&M Braves football
- Conference: South Central Athletic Conference
- Record: 3–2 (2–1 SCAC)
- Head coach: A. A. Abraham (2nd season)

The 1942 Alcorn A&M Braves football team represented Alcorn Agricultural and Mechanical College—now known as Alcorn State University—as a member of the South Central Athletic Conference (SCAC) during the 1942 college football season. Led by second-year head coach, A. A. Abraham, the Braves compiled an overall record of 3–2.

== Schedule ==
| Date | Opponent | Site | Result | Source |
|---|---|---|---|---|
| October 31 | Mississippi Industrial* | Alcorn, MS | W 27–0 | |
| November 7 | Okolona Industrial | Alcorn, MS | W 76–0 | |
| November 14 | Louisiana Normal (Grambling)* | | L 0–27 | |
| November 21 | Leland^{†} | Alcorn, MS | L 19–20 | |
| November 28 | Tougaloo | Alcorn, MS | W 39–0 | |
*Non-conference game; ^{†}Homecoming
