= Felmon Motley =

American football player and civil rights advocate (1921–2004)

Delaware State Hornets
- Positions: Fullback, lineman

Personal information
- Born: March 18, 1921; Alabama, U.S.
- Died: August 28, 2004 (aged 83); Delaware, U.S.

Career information
- High school: Cobb High School
- College: Alabama A&M (1941); Delaware State (1942, 1946–1947)

Awards and highlights
- Delaware Sports Museum and Hall of Fame (1998); Delaware State University Hall of Fame (2010–2011)

Felmon Devoner Motley (March 18, 1921 – August 28, 2004) was an American football player and civil rights advocate. He played fullback and lineman for the Alabama A&M Bulldogs and the Delaware State Hornets. He was inducted into the Delaware Sports Museum and Hall of Fame in 1998.

== Early life and college career ==
Motley was born on March 18, 1921, in Alabama. He grew up in Anniston, and attended Cobb High School under coach Dyke Smith, graduating in 1940. Motley joined Alabama A&M University in 1941, playing for their football team that was coached by Smith. When Smith left for Delaware State College in 1942, he took along Motley and 32 other players. That year, Motley ran a 9.9 second 100-yard dash for Delaware State. He served in World War II from 1943 to 1945, and played on a military service team at Fort Huachuca. With Fort Huachuca, he was one of the "Black Four Horsemen," as the media called them, along with Bernie "Catfish" George, William "Rip" Stephens, and Nate "What a Man" Johnson. In the 1945 Copper Bowl, he scored the game winning touchdown after stealing the ball from the quarterback in the final seconds. "The coach told me to get the ball," he later said, "and back then you did what the coach said." He returned in 1946, and graduated following the 1947 season.

== Later life and death ==
After earning a master of education degree from the University of Delaware in 1952, Motley became a teacher at Seaford High School, and was the first black teacher at an all-white school in the southern part of the state. He often would clean up his industrial arts classroom by himself, because others at the school refused to help a black man. He spent a total of 37 years as a teacher, retiring in 1984.

From 1963 to 1967 he served as president of the Delaware State Alumni Association, and later created the school's Wall of Honor. Motley also created the school's motto, "Enter to Learn and Go Forth to Serve".

In the 1960s, he served as the Omega Psi Phi official photographer, and marched with Martin Luther King Jr. and several other civil rights leaders.

Motley was nominated to the Delaware Sports Museum and Hall of Fame by Bill Collick, and was inducted in 1998. He died on August 28, 2004, at the age of 83 in Delaware. He was posthumously inducted into the Delaware State University Hall of Fame in 2010–11.
