= Melvin Vines =

American football player and coach (1904–1984)

Biographical details
- Born: February 20, 1904; Walker County, Alabama, U.S.
- Died: December 26, 1984 (aged 80); Tuscaloosa, Alabama, U.S.

Playing career
- 1925–1926: Alabama
- 1928–1929: Alabama
- Position: Quarterback

Coaching career (HC unless noted)
- 1930–1941: Athens HS (AL)
- 1942: Tampa
- 1944: Jackson County HS (AL)
- 1945–1946: Jones County
- 1946: Mortimer Jordan HS (AL)
- 1948–1961: Hueytown HS (AL)

Head coaching record
- Overall: 5–5 (college); 135–101–21 (high school)

Melvin Lane Vines (February 20, 1904 – December 26, 1984) was an American football player and coach. He was a high school football head coach for 28 seasons in the state of Alabama during the years from 1930 to 1941 and 1944, 1946 and 1948-1961 where he compiled a record of 135–101–21. Vines also served as the head football coach at the University of Tampa in 1942. As a college football player, he was a member of two national championship teams at the University of Alabama where he played on the first Southern teams to compete in The Rose Bowl in Pasadena, California.

He graduated from Alliance High School in rural western Jefferson County, Alabama. The school no longer exists. During his time at Alliance High School he was "All-State" in both basketball and football.

During his time in college at The University of Alabama in Tuscaloosa a bizarre incident occurred following the 1926 season. While strolling across the campus he spotted a gang of young men attempting to force a young woman into an automobile. He ran to the car and fought with the driver through the window of the car until it came to a stop and the woman was able to escape. However, having foiled the kidnapping Vines was stabbed in the arm several times and missed the entire following football season. He had limited use of his right arm for the remainder of his life. He did return to play for the Crimson Tide in 1928.

In 2003, to honor his memory Gilmore Stadium where he coached the Hueytown High School Golden Gophers for 14 years, was renamed "Gilmore-Vines" Stadium.

== Head coaching record ==
=== College football ===
Year	Team	Overall	Conference	Standing	Bowl/playoffs
Tampa Spartans (Independent) (1942)
1942	Tampa	5–5			
Tampa:		5–5			
Total:		5–5			

=== High school ===
- Athens High School (1930–1941): 53–43–9
- Jackson CountyHigh School (1944): 1–6
- Mortimer Jordan High School (1946): 4–4–1
- Hueytown High School (1948–1961): 77–48–11
