= 1942 Middle Tennessee State Teachers Blue Raiders football team =

American college football season

1942 Middle Tennessee State Teachers Blue Raiders football
- Conference: Independent
- Record: 4–2–1
- Head coach: Elwin W. Midgett (3rd season)
- Captains: Emory Davenport; Smith; Bill Burkett
- Home stadium: Horace Jones Field

1942 Southern college football independents records
	Conf.			Overall
Team	W	L	T	W		L		T
Louisiana Normal (Grambling)		–		9	–	0	–	0
Delaware		–		8	–	0	–	0
Mississippi Southern		–		4	–	0	–	0
Sewanee		–		1	–	0	–	0
Miami (FL)		–		7	–	2	–	0
Delaware State		–		3	–	1	–	1
Middle Tennessee State Teachers		–		4	–	2	–	1
Chattanooga		–		7	–	4	–	0
Georgetown		–		5	–	3	–	1
Navy		–		5	–	4	–	0
West Virginia		–		5	–	4	–	0
Western Maryland		–		4	–	4	–	1
Tennessee Tech		–		3	–	4	–	2
Virginia		–		2	–	6	–	1
Roanoke		–		1	–	5	–	1

The 1942 Middle Tennessee State Teachers football team represented the Middle Tennessee State Teachers College (now known as Middle Tennessee State University) as an independent during the 1942 college football season. Led by Elwin W. Midgett in his third season as head coach, Middle Tennessee State Teachers compiled a record of 4–2–1. The team's captains were Emory Davenport, Smith, and Bill Burkett.

Middle Tennessee was ranked at No. 338 (out of 590 college and military teams) in the final rankings under the Litkenhous Difference by Score System for 1942.

== Schedule ==
Date	Opponent	Site	Result	Attendance	Source
September 24	at Memphis State	Crump Stadium; Memphis, TN	W 21–13		
October 3	Troy State	Horace Jones Field; Murfreesboro, TN (rivalry)	W 20–0		
October 9	Camp Forrest	Horace Jones Field; Murfreesboro, TN	W 26–7		
October 22	Maryville (TN)	Horace Jones Field; Murfreesboro, TN	W 19–13		
October 31	at Tampa	Phillips Field; Tampa, FL	L 0–13	1,000	
November 14	at Murray State	Cutchin Stadium; Murray, KY	T 14–14		
November 25	Tennessee Tech	Horace Jones Field; Murfreesboro, TN	L 7–25		
