= Dyke Smith =

American football player and coach (1912–1986)

Biographical details
- Born: March 17, 1912; Cook County, Illinois, U.S.
- Died: April 16, 1986 (aged 74); Anniston, Alabama, U.S.

Playing career

Football
- 1932–1936: Morris Brown

Basketball
- 1932–1936: Morris Brown
- Positions: Quarterback (football); Forward (basketball)

Coaching career (HC unless noted)

Football
- 1937–1938: Team in Georgia
- 1939: Cobb HS (AL)
- 1940: Edward Waters
- 1941: Alabama A&M
- 1942: Delaware State

Head coaching record
- Overall: 16–6–2 (college)

Accomplishments and honors

Awards
- Morris Brown Athletic Hall of Fame; Delaware State Athletic Hall of Fame (1985)

Frank Donald "Dyke" Smith (March 17, 1912 – April 16, 1986) was an American football player and coach. After playing two sports in college for Morris Brown, Smith coached a team in Georgia from 1937 to 1938, Cobb High School in 1939, Edward Waters University in 1940, Alabama A&M University in 1941, and Delaware State University (then Delaware State College) in 1942.

== Early life and education ==
Smith was born on March 17, 1912, in Cook County, Illinois and grew up in Evanston. He attended Morris Brown College from 1932 to 1936, playing football and basketball. In football, he was the school's starting quarterback, and was named an All-America selection by most black newspapers. In basketball, he played forward, winning All-Southern Conference as Morris Brown won 48 straight games from 1932 to 1933. He was an inaugural inductee to the school's hall of fame.

== Coaching career ==
After graduating in 1937, Smith started a coaching career with a football team in Georgia. In 1939, he moved to Anniston, Alabama, to become the first head coach at Cobb High School, coaching "anything that anybody wanted to play." He accepted a position at Edward Waters University in 1940, spending one season there, before moving to Alabama A&M University in 1941. He compiled a 6–4 record that year with Alabama A&M. Smith was hired by Delaware State College (now Delaware State University) in 1942, compiling a 3–1–1 record in one season before being drafted to serve in World War II.

Multiple of the athletes he coached followed him from school to school, including Felmon Motley, who attended Cobb, Alabama A&M, and Delaware State. When he joined Delaware State, 33 members of the 1941 Alabama A&M team followed him there.

== Later life and death ==
After returning from World War II, he taught social studies and math at several schools in Chicago, Illinois, and Newark, New Jersey. He also coached a semi-professional football team in New Jersey for several years, but did not coach besides that.

In 1985, Smith was inducted into the Delaware State College Athletic Hall of Fame. Felmon Motley and several other 1942 Delaware State players put their money together to fly Smith to Delaware for a team reunion. "He really had a nice time seeing all the boys," Motley said. "When I got him back to the airport, he said he was ready to go back and die because he had seen everyone again. He had wondered what had happened to everyone. He had a nice time seeing his friends and the fellows he coached." Smith died on April 16, 1986, in Anniston at the age of 74.

== Head coaching record ==
=== College ===
| Year | Team | Overall | Conference | Standing | Bowl/playoffs |
|---|---|---|---|---|---|
Edward Waters Tigers (Independent) (1940)
| 1940 | Edward Waters | 7–1–1 | | | |
| Edward Waters: | | 7–1–1 | | | |
Alabama A&M Bulldogs (Independent) (1941)
| 1941 | Alabama A&M | 6–4 | | | |
| Alabama A&M: | | 6–4 | | | |
Delaware State Hornets (Independent) (1942)
| 1942 | Delaware State | 3–1–1 | | | |
| Delaware State: | | 3–1–1 | | | |
| Total: | | 16–6–2 | | | |
