= 1942 Troy State Red Wave football team =

American college football season

1942 Troy State Red Wave football

AIC champion
- Conference: Alabama Intercollegiate Conference
- Record: 4–3 (2–0 AIC)
- Head coach: Albert Choate (6th season)
- Home stadium: Pace Field

The 1942 Troy State Red Wave football team represented Troy State Teachers College (now known as Troy University) as a member of the Alabama Intercollegiate Conference (AIC) during the 1942 college football season. Led by sixth-year head coach Albert Choate, the Red Wave compiled an overall record of 4–3, with a mark of 2–0 in conference play, winning the AIC title.

== Schedule ==
Date	Opponent	Site	Result	Attendance	Source
October 3	at Middle Tennessee State*	Horace Jones Field; Murfreesboro, TN (rivalry)	L 0–20		
October 9	Brookley Field*	Pace Field; Troy, AL	W 50–0		
October 17	at Tampa*	Phillips Field; Tampa, FL	L 0–27		
October 24	at Fort Benning*	Doughboy Stadium; Fort Benning, GA	W 20–6	8,000	
November 6	at Marion	Johnson Field; Marion, AL	W 19–7		
November 13	Marion	Pace Field; Troy, AL	W 33–21		
November 27	at Southeastern Louisiana*	Strawberry Stadium; Hammond, LA	L 7–45		
*Non-conference game
