= Lefty Jamerson =

American baseball player (1900–1980)

Righty Jamerson
- Pitcher
- Born: January 26, 1900; Enfield, Illinois, U.S.
- Died: August 4, 1980 (aged 80); Mocksville, North Carolina, U.S.
- Batted: Left Threw: Left

MLB debut
- August 16, 1924, for the Boston Red Sox

Last MLB appearance
- August 16, 1924, for the Boston Red Sox

MLB statistics
- Games played: 1
- Innings pitched: 1
- Earned runs: 2
- Stats at Baseball Reference

Teams
- Boston Red Sox (1924)

Charles Dewey "Lefty" Jamerson (January 26, 1900 – August 4, 1980) was an American relief pitcher in Major League Baseball. Listed at 6' 1", 195 lb., he batted and threw left-handed.

A native of Enfield, Illinois, Jamerson was a player whose major league career, statistically speaking, was only slightly different from that of Red Bluhm, Eddie Gaedel, or Moonlight Graham. On August 16, 1924, Jamerson pitched for the Boston Red Sox against the St. Louis Browns at Fenway Park. In one inning of work, he allowed two runs on one hit and three walks for an 18.00 earned run average. He did not have a decision. After that, he never appeared in a major league game again. He then played for the Pittsfield Hillies of the Eastern League from 1925 to 1927 and the Hartford Senators of the Eastern League in 1926. He also played for the Hartford Blues of the National Football League in 1926.

After his playing career ended, he served as the head football coach at the University of Memphis in 1942 and at Davidson College from 1948 to 1949.

Jamerson died in Mocksville, North Carolina, at the age of 80.

== Head coaching record ==
=== Football ===
Year	Team	Overall	Conference	Standing	Bowl/playoffs
Memphis State Tigers (Independent) (1942)
1942	Memphis State	2–7			
Memphis State:		2–7			
Davidson Wildcats (Southern Conference) (1948–1949)
1948	Davidson	3–5–1	2–5	12th	
1949	Davidson	2–8	1–5	16th	
Davidson:		5–13–1	3–10		
Total:		7–20–1			

== See also ==
- Cup of coffee
