= 1942 Chattanooga Moccasins football team =

American college football season

1942 Chattanooga Moccasins football
- Conference: Independent
- Record: 7–4
- Head coach: Scrappy Moore (12th season)
- Captain: Vernon Fromang
- Home stadium: Chamberlain Field

1942 Southern college football independents records
| | Conf. | | | Overall |
| Team | W | L | T | W | | L | | T |
|---|---|---|---|---|---|---|---|---|
| Louisiana Normal (Grambling) | | – | | 9 | – | 0 | – | 0 |
| Delaware | | – | | 8 | – | 0 | – | 0 |
| Mississippi Southern | | – | | 4 | – | 0 | – | 0 |
| Sewanee | | – | | 1 | – | 0 | – | 0 |
| Miami (FL) | | – | | 7 | – | 2 | – | 0 |
| Delaware State | | – | | 3 | – | 1 | – | 1 |
| Middle Tennessee State Teachers | | – | | 4 | – | 2 | – | 1 |
| Chattanooga | | – | | 7 | – | 4 | – | 0 |
| Georgetown | | – | | 5 | – | 3 | – | 1 |
| Navy | | – | | 5 | – | 4 | – | 0 |
| West Virginia | | – | | 5 | – | 4 | – | 0 |
| Western Maryland | | – | | 4 | – | 4 | – | 1 |
| Tennessee Tech | | – | | 3 | – | 4 | – | 2 |
| Virginia | | – | | 2 | – | 6 | – | 1 |
| Roanoke | | – | | 1 | – | 5 | – | 1 |

The 1942 Chattanooga Moccasins football team was an American football team that represented the University of Chattanooga (now known as the University of Tennessee at Chattanooga) as an independent during the 1942 college football season. In its 12th year under head coach Scrappy Moore, the team compiled a 7–4 record.

Chattanooga was ranked at No. 92 (out of 590 college and military teams) in the final rankings under the Litkenhous Difference by Score System for 1942.

== Schedule ==
| Date | Opponent | Site | Result | Attendance | Source |
|---|---|---|---|---|---|
| September 18 | at Auburn | Cramton Bowl; Montgomery, AL | L 7–20 | 8,000 | |
| September 26 | Fort Benning | Chamberlain Field; Chattanooga, TN | W 20–0 | | |
| October 3 | Maryville (TN) | Chamberlain Field; Chattanooga, TN | W 52–7 | | |
| October 10 | at Georgia Tech | Grant Field; Atlanta, GA | L 12–30 | 12,000 | |
| October 16 | Tennessee Tech | Chamberlain Field; Chattanooga, TN | W 21–0 | 4,000 | |
| October 23 | Memphis State | Chamberlain Field; Chattanooga, TN | W 44–19 | 3,000 | |
| October 31 | at Rollins | Orlando Stadium; Orlando, FL | W 14–6 | 13,500 | |
| November 7 | at Dayton | UD Stadium; Dayton, OH | L 12–14 | | |
| November 14 | No. 1 Georgia^{†} | Chamberlain Field; Chattanooga, TN | L 0–40 | 5,500 | |
| November 21 | Newberry | Chamberlain Field; Chattanooga, TN | W 33–7 | 1,200 | |
| November 26 | Centre | Chamberlain Field; Chattanooga, TN | W 61–14 | 3,000 | |
^{†}Homecoming; Rankings from AP Poll released prior to the game
