= 1942 Mississippi Southern Southerners football team =

American college football season

1942 Mississippi Southern Southerners football
- Conference: Independent
- Record: 4–0
- Head coach: Reed Green (6th season)
- Home stadium: Faulkner Field

1942 Southern college football independents records
	Conf.			Overall
Team	W	L	T	W		L		T
Louisiana Normal (Grambling)		–		9	–	0	–	0
Delaware		–		8	–	0	–	0
Mississippi Southern		–		4	–	0	–	0
Sewanee		–		1	–	0	–	0
Miami (FL)		–		7	–	2	–	0
Delaware State		–		3	–	1	–	1
Middle Tennessee State Teachers		–		4	–	2	–	1
Chattanooga		–		7	–	4	–	0
Georgetown		–		5	–	3	–	1
Navy		–		5	–	4	–	0
West Virginia		–		5	–	4	–	0
Western Maryland		–		4	–	4	–	1
Tennessee Tech		–		3	–	4	–	2
Virginia		–		2	–	6	–	1
Roanoke		–		1	–	5	–	1

The 1942 Mississippi Southern Southerners football team represented Mississippi Southern College (now known as the University of Southern Mississippi) in the 1942 college football season. The team compiled a 4–0 record in the wartime football setting of WWII, and outscored their opponents by a total of 142 to 7.

== Schedule ==
Date	Opponent	Site	Result	Source
	Tampa		Cancelled	
	Alabama		Cancelled	
	Louisiana Tech		Cancelled	
	Southeastern Louisiana		Cancelled	
	Louisiana Normal		Cancelled	
	Southwestern Louisiana		Cancelled	
	Spring Hill		Cancelled	
	Louisiana College		Cancelled	
October 23	Sixth Service Squad	Faulkner Field; Hattiesburg, MS	W 41–0	
October 31	Mobile Shipbuilders	Mobile, AL	W 26–7	
November 20	Mobile Shipbuilders (Chickasaw Redskins?)	Faulkner Field; Hattiesburg, MS	W 42–0	
November 27	St. Mary's (TX)	Faulkner Field; Hattiesburg, MS	Cancelled	
December 4	Brookley Field	Faulkner Field; Hattiesburg, MS	W 33–0	
