= 1942 Miami Hurricanes football team =

American college football season

1942 Miami Hurricanes football
- Conference: Independent
- Record: 7–2
- Head coach: Jack Harding (6th season)
- Home stadium: Burdine Stadium

1942 Southern college football independents records
	Conf.			Overall
Team	W	L	T	W		L		T
Louisiana Normal (Grambling)		–		9	–	0	–	0
Delaware		–		8	–	0	–	0
Mississippi Southern		–		4	–	0	–	0
Sewanee		–		1	–	0	–	0
Miami (FL)		–		7	–	2	–	0
Delaware State		–		3	–	1	–	1
Middle Tennessee State Teachers		–		4	–	2	–	1
Chattanooga		–		7	–	4	–	0
Georgetown		–		5	–	3	–	1
Navy		–		5	–	4	–	0
West Virginia		–		5	–	4	–	0
Western Maryland		–		4	–	4	–	1
Tennessee Tech		–		3	–	4	–	2
Virginia		–		2	–	6	–	1
Roanoke		–		1	–	5	–	1

The 1942 Miami Hurricanes football team represented the University of Miami as an independent during the 1942 college football season. The Hurricanes played their eight home games at Burdine Stadium in Miami, Florida. The team was led by sixth-year head coach Jack Harding and finished with a 7–2 record.

Miami was ranked at No. 40 (out of 590 college and military teams) in the final rankings under the Litkenhous Difference by Score System for 1942.

== Schedule ==
Date	Opponent	Site	Result	Attendance	Source
October 3	Jacksonville NAS	Burdine Stadium; Miami, FL	L 0–14	9,333	
October 10	Tampa	Burdine Stadium; Miami, FL	W 65–6	8,860	
October 16	at Saint Louis	Walsh Memorial Stadium; St. Louis, MO	W 31–6	7,000	
October 24	Rollins	Burdine Stadium; Miami, FL	W 21–0	10,300	
October 31	Furman	Burdine Stadium; Miami, FL	W 32–13	7,421	
November 7	NC State	Burdine Stadium; Miami, FL	L 0–2	11,066	
November 14	Florida	Burdine Stadium; Miami, FL (rivalry)	W 12–0	15,558	
November 21	South Carolina	Burdine Stadium; Miami, FL	W 13–6	9,774	
November 28	West Virginia	Burdine Stadium; Miami, FL	W 21–13	9,717	
