= 1942 Navy Midshipmen football team =

American college football season

1942 Navy Midshipmen football
- Conference: Independent
- Record: 5–4
- Head coach: John Whelchel (1st season)
- Captain: Alan Cameron
- Home stadium: Thompson Stadium

1942 Southern college football independents records
	Conf.			Overall
Team	W	L	T	W		L		T
Louisiana Normal (Grambling)		–		9	–	0	–	0
Delaware		–		8	–	0	–	0
Mississippi Southern		–		4	–	0	–	0
Sewanee		–		1	–	0	–	0
Miami (FL)		–		7	–	2	–	0
Delaware State		–		3	–	1	–	1
Middle Tennessee State Teachers		–		4	–	2	–	1
Chattanooga		–		7	–	4	–	0
Georgetown		–		5	–	3	–	1
Navy		–		5	–	4	–	0
West Virginia		–		5	–	4	–	0
Western Maryland		–		4	–	4	–	1
Tennessee Tech		–		3	–	4	–	2
Virginia		–		2	–	6	–	1
Roanoke		–		1	–	5	–	1

The 1942 Navy Midshipmen football team represented the United States Naval Academy during the 1942 college football season. In their first season under head coach John Whelchel, the Midshipmen compiled a 5–4 record, shut out five opponents and outscored all opponents by a combined score of 82 to 58.

Navy was ranked at No. 32 (out of 590 college and military teams) in the final rankings under the Litkenhous Difference by Score System for 1942.

== Schedule ==
Date	Opponent	Site	Result	Attendance	Source
September 26	William & Mary	Thompson Stadium; Annapolis, MD	L 0–3	10,000	
October 3	Virginia	Thompson Stadium; Annapolis, MD	W 35–0	15,000	
October 10	vs. Princeton	Yankee Stadium; Bronx, NY	L 0–10	25,000	
October 17	Yale	Municipal Stadium; Baltimore, MD	W 13–6		
October 24	No. 6 Georgia Tech	Thompson Stadium; Annapolis, MD	L 0–21		
October 31	vs. No. 4 Notre Dame	Municipal Stadium; Cleveland, OH (rivalry)	L 0–9	66,699	
November 7	at No. 9 Penn	Franklin Field; Philadelphia, PA	W 7–0		
November 14	Columbia	Municipal Stadium; Baltimore, MD	W 13–9	25,000	
November 28	Army	Thompson Stadium; Annapolis, MD (Army–Navy Game)	W 14–0		
Rankings from AP Poll released prior to the game
