= 1942 Delaware State Hornets football team =

American college football season

1942 Delaware State Hornets football
- Conference: Independent
- Record: 3–1–1
- Head coach: Dyke Smith (1st season)
- Home stadium: Soldier's Field

1942 Southern college football independents records
| | Conf. | | | Overall |
| Team | W | L | T | W | | L | | T |
|---|---|---|---|---|---|---|---|---|
| Louisiana Normal (Grambling) | | – | | 9 | – | 0 | – | 0 |
| Delaware | | – | | 8 | – | 0 | – | 0 |
| Mississippi Southern | | – | | 4 | – | 0 | – | 0 |
| Sewanee | | – | | 1 | – | 0 | – | 0 |
| Miami (FL) | | – | | 7 | – | 2 | – | 0 |
| Delaware State | | – | | 3 | – | 1 | – | 1 |
| Middle Tennessee State Teachers | | – | | 4 | – | 2 | – | 1 |
| Chattanooga | | – | | 7 | – | 4 | – | 0 |
| Georgetown | | – | | 5 | – | 3 | – | 1 |
| Navy | | – | | 5 | – | 4 | – | 0 |
| West Virginia | | – | | 5 | – | 4 | – | 0 |
| Western Maryland | | – | | 4 | – | 4 | – | 1 |
| Tennessee Tech | | – | | 3 | – | 4 | – | 2 |
| Virginia | | – | | 2 | – | 6 | – | 1 |
| Roanoke | | – | | 1 | – | 5 | – | 1 |

The 1942 Delaware State Hornets football team represented the State College for Colored Students—now known as Delaware State University—in the 1942 college football season as an independent. Led by first-year head coach Dyke Smith, the Hornets compiled a 3–1–1 record.

== Schedule ==
| Date | Time | Opponent | Site | Result | Attendance | Source |
|---|---|---|---|---|---|---|
| October 2 | | at Virginia Union | Richmond, VA | W 6–0 | | |
| October 24 | | at Howard | Washington, DC | T 13–13 | 4,000 | |
| October 31 | | Winston-Salem | Soldier's Field; Dover, DE | W 32–6 | | |
| November 14 | | Fort DuPont | Soldier's Field; Dover, DE | W 27–0 | | |
| November 21 | 2:00 p.m. | vs. Lincoln (PA) | Wilmington Park; Wilmington, DE | L 6–34 | 1,800 | |
