= 1942 Georgetown Hoyas football team =

American college football season

1942 Georgetown Hoyas football
- Conference: Independent
- Record: 5–3–1
- Head coach: Jack Hagerty (11th season)
- Captain: Game captains
- Home stadium: Griffith Stadium

1942 Southern college football independents records
	Conf.			Overall
Team	W	L	T	W		L		T
Louisiana Normal (Grambling)		–		9	–	0	–	0
Delaware		–		8	–	0	–	0
Mississippi Southern		–		4	–	0	–	0
Sewanee		–		1	–	0	–	0
Miami (FL)		–		7	–	2	–	0
Delaware State		–		3	–	1	–	1
Middle Tennessee State Teachers		–		4	–	2	–	1
Chattanooga		–		7	–	4	–	0
Georgetown		–		5	–	3	–	1
Navy		–		5	–	4	–	0
West Virginia		–		5	–	4	–	0
Western Maryland		–		4	–	4	–	1
Tennessee Tech		–		3	–	4	–	2
Virginia		–		2	–	6	–	1
Roanoke		–		1	–	5	–	1

The 1942 Georgetown Hoyas football team was an American football team that represented Georgetown University as an independent during the 1942 college football season. In their 11th season under head coach Jack Hagerty, the Hoyas compiled a 5–3–1 record and were outscored by a total of 115 to 92.

Georgetown was ranked at No. 77 (out of 590 college and military teams) in the final rankings under the Litkenhous Difference by Score System for 1942.

The team played its home games at Griffith Stadium in Washington, D.C.

== Schedule ==
Date	Opponent	Site	Result	Attendance	Source
September 25	at Temple	Temple Stadium; Philadelphia, PA	W 7–0	22,000	
October 2	Ole Miss	Griffith Stadium; Washington, DC	W 14–6	15,000	
October 10	Manhattan	Griffith Stadium; Washington, DC	W 9–7	12,000	
October 17	Auburn	Griffith Stadium; Washington, DC	T 6–6	12,500	
October 24	at Detroit	University of Detroit Stadium; Detroit, MI	L 0–6		
October 31	at No. 7 Boston College	Fenway Park; Boston, MA	L 0–47	30,000	
November 7	North Carolina Pre-Flight	Griffith Stadium; Washington, DC	L 7–23	12,000	
November 14	at NC State	Riddick Stadium; Raleigh, NC	W 28–20		
November 21	George Washington	Griffith Stadium; Washington, DC	W 21–0	10,000	
Rankings from AP Poll released prior to the game
