= 1942 Delaware Fightin' Blue Hens football team =

American college football season

1942 Delaware Fightin' Blue Hens football
- Conference: Independent
- Record: 8–0
- Head coach: William D. Murray (3rd season)
- Home stadium: Frazer Field, Wilmington Park

1942 Southern college football independents records
	Conf.			Overall
Team	W	L	T	W		L		T
Louisiana Normal (Grambling)		–		9	–	0	–	0
Delaware		–		8	–	0	–	0
Mississippi Southern		–		4	–	0	–	0
Sewanee		–		1	–	0	–	0
Miami (FL)		–		7	–	2	–	0
Delaware State		–		3	–	1	–	1
Middle Tennessee State Teachers		–		4	–	2	–	1
Chattanooga		–		7	–	4	–	0
Georgetown		–		5	–	3	–	1
Navy		–		5	–	4	–	0
West Virginia		–		5	–	4	–	0
Western Maryland		–		4	–	4	–	1
Tennessee Tech		–		3	–	4	–	2
Virginia		–		2	–	6	–	1
Roanoke		–		1	–	5	–	1

The 1942 Delaware Fightin' Blue Hens football team was an American football team that represented the University of Delaware in the 1942 college football season. In its third season under head coach William D. Murray, the team compiled an 8–0 record, shut out five of eight opponents, and outscored all opponents by a total of 196 to 28.

Delaware's 1942 season was part of a 32-game unbeaten streak that began on October 26, 1940, and ended on October 3, 1947. The only imperfection was a 7-7 tie with West Chester on September 27, 1941, which was followed by a 26-game winning streak.

Delaware was ranked at No. 112 (out of 590 college and military teams) in the final rankings under the Litkenhous Difference by Score System for 1942.

== Schedule ==
Date	Opponent	Site	Result	Attendance	Source
September 25	West Chester	Wilmington Park; Wilmington, DE (rivalry)	W 20–0	6,000	
October 3	at Drexel	Drexel Field; Philadelphia PA	W 40–0	6,000	
October 10	Lakehurst NAS	Wilmington Park; Wilmington DE	W 20–7	7,000	
October 17	Gettysburg	Wilmington Park; Wilmington, DE	W 13–0		
October 24	at Dickinson	Carlisle, PA	W 20–0		
October 31	Pennsylvania Military	Wilmington Park; Wilmington, DE	W 19–14	4,200	
November 7	Swarthmore^{†}	Frazer Field; Newark, DE	W 19–7		
November 14	Western Maryland	Wilmington Park; Wilmington, DE	W 45–0		
^{†}Homecoming
