= 1942 Sewanee Tigers football team =

American college football season

1942 Sewanee Tigers football
- Conference: Independent
- Record: 1–0
- Head coach: Unknown
- Home stadium: Hardee Field

1942 Southern college football independents records
	Conf.			Overall
Team	W	L	T	W		L		T
Louisiana Normal (Grambling)		–		9	–	0	–	0
Delaware		–		8	–	0	–	0
Mississippi Southern		–		4	–	0	–	0
Sewanee		–		1	–	0	–	0
Miami (FL)		–		7	–	2	–	0
Delaware State		–		3	–	1	–	1
Middle Tennessee State Teachers		–		4	–	2	–	1
Chattanooga		–		7	–	4	–	0
Georgetown		–		5	–	3	–	1
Navy		–		5	–	4	–	0
West Virginia		–		5	–	4	–	0
Western Maryland		–		4	–	4	–	1
Tennessee Tech		–		3	–	4	–	2
Virginia		–		2	–	6	–	1
Roanoke		–		1	–	5	–	1

The 1942 Sewanee Tigers football team was an American football team that represented Sewanee: The University of the South as an independent during the 1942 college football season. Five games were scheduled but only one was played. Sewanee compiled a 1–0 record.

== Schedule ==
Date	Opponent	Site	Result
October 31	Georgia Tech "B" team	Hardee Field; Sewanee, TN	W 7–0
November 7	Southwestern (TN)	Hardee Field; Sewanee, TN	Cancelled
November 13	Camp Forrest	Hardee Field; Sewanee, TN	Cancelled
November 21	at Southwestern (TN)	Crump Stadium; Memphis, TN	Cancelled
November 26	vs. Camp Forrest	Crump Stadium; Memphis, TN	Cancelled
