= 1942 West Virginia Mountaineers football team =

American college football season

1942 West Virginia Mountaineers football
- Conference: Independent
- Record: 5–4
- Head coach: Bill Kern (3rd season)
- Captain: Richard McElwee
- Home stadium: Mountaineer Field

1942 Southern college football independents records
	Conf.			Overall
Team	W	L	T	W		L		T
Louisiana Normal (Grambling)		–		9	–	0	–	0
Delaware		–		8	–	0	–	0
Mississippi Southern		–		4	–	0	–	0
Sewanee		–		1	–	0	–	0
Miami (FL)		–		7	–	2	–	0
Delaware State		–		3	–	1	–	1
Middle Tennessee State Teachers		–		4	–	2	–	1
Chattanooga		–		7	–	4	–	0
Georgetown		–		5	–	3	–	1
Navy		–		5	–	4	–	0
West Virginia		–		5	–	4	–	0
Western Maryland		–		4	–	4	–	1
Tennessee Tech		–		3	–	4	–	2
Virginia		–		2	–	6	–	1
Roanoke		–		1	–	5	–	1

The 1942 West Virginia Mountaineers football team was an American football team that represented West Virginia University as an independent during the 1942 college football season. In its third season under head coach Bill Kern, the team compiled a 5–4 record and outscored opponents by a total of 119 to 91. Richard McElwee was the team captain. The team played home games at Mountaineer Field in Morgantown, West Virginia.

West Virginia was ranked at No. 63 (out of 590 college and military teams) in the final rankings under the Litkenhous Difference by Score System for 1942.

== Schedule ==
Date	Opponent	Site	Result	Attendance	Source
September 26	vs. Washington and Lee	Laidley Field; Charleston, WV	W 21–7	8,000	
October 3	at Boston College	Fenway Park; Boston, MA	L 0–33	15,000–18,000	
October 10	South Carolina	Mountaineer Field; Morgantown, WV	W 13–0	8,046	
October 17	at Fordham	Polo Grounds; New York, NY	L 14–23	12,300	
October 24	Waynesburg	Mountaineer Field; Morgantown, WV	W 27–0	4,544	
October 31	Penn State^{†}	Mountaineer Field; Morgantown, WV (rivalry)	W 24–0	12,016	
November 14	at Kentucky	McLean Stadium; Lexington, KY	W 7–0		
November 21	at Michigan State	Macklin Field; East Lansing, MI	L 0–7	6,400	
November 28	at Miami (FL)	Burdine Stadium; Miami, FL	L 13–21	9,717	
^{†}Homecoming
