= 1942 Roanoke Maroons football team =

American college football season

1942 Roanoke Maroons football
- Conference: Independent
- Record: 1–5–1
- Head coach: Buddy Hackman (1st season)
- Home stadium: College Field

1942 Southern college football independents records
	Conf.			Overall
Team	W	L	T	W		L		T
Louisiana Normal (Grambling)		–		9	–	0	–	0
Delaware		–		8	–	0	–	0
Mississippi Southern		–		4	–	0	–	0
Sewanee		–		1	–	0	–	0
Miami (FL)		–		7	–	2	–	0
Delaware State		–		3	–	1	–	1
Middle Tennessee State Teachers		–		4	–	2	–	1
Chattanooga		–		7	–	4	–	0
Georgetown		–		5	–	3	–	1
Navy		–		5	–	4	–	0
West Virginia		–		5	–	4	–	0
Western Maryland		–		4	–	4	–	1
Tennessee Tech		–		3	–	4	–	2
Virginia		–		2	–	6	–	1
Roanoke		–		1	–	5	–	1

The 1942 Roanoke Maroons football team represented Roanoke College as an independent during the 1942 college football season. Led by first-year head coach Buddy Hackman, the Maroons compiled an overall record of 1–5–1.

== Schedule ==
Date	Opponent	Site	Result	Attendance	Source
September 25	Guilford	College Field; Salem, VA	W 15–0		
October 2	at Milligan	Roosevelt Stadium; Johnson City, TN	L 0–6		
October 10	vs. Emory and Henry	Bristol Municipal Stadium; Bristol, TN	T 13–13		
October 24	at Hampden–Sydney	Hampden-Sydney, VA	L 6–33	1,500	
October 31	Randolph–Macon	College Field; Salem, VA	L 0–19		
November 7	at Centre	Farris Stadium; Danville, KY	L 7–40		
November 13	at Catawba	Shuford Stadium; Salisbury, NC	L 0–42	1,000	
