= 1942 Virginia Cavaliers football team =

American college football season

1942 Virginia Cavaliers football
- Conference: Independent
- Record: 2–6–1
- Head coach: Frank Murray (6th season)
- Captain: William Hill
- Home stadium: Scott Stadium

1942 Southern college football independents records
	Conf.			Overall
Team	W	L	T	W		L		T
Louisiana Normal (Grambling)		–		9	–	0	–	0
Delaware		–		8	–	0	–	0
Mississippi Southern		–		4	–	0	–	0
Sewanee		–		1	–	0	–	0
Miami (FL)		–		7	–	2	–	0
Delaware State		–		3	–	1	–	1
Middle Tennessee State Teachers		–		4	–	2	–	1
Chattanooga		–		7	–	4	–	0
Georgetown		–		5	–	3	–	1
Navy		–		5	–	4	–	0
West Virginia		–		5	–	4	–	0
Western Maryland		–		4	–	4	–	1
Tennessee Tech		–		3	–	4	–	2
Virginia		–		2	–	6	–	1
Roanoke		–		1	–	5	–	1

The 1942 Virginia Cavaliers football team represented the University of Virginia during the 1942 college football season. The Cavaliers were led by sixth-year head coach Frank Murray and played their home games at Scott Stadium in Charlottesville, Virginia. They competed as independents, finishing with a record of 2–6–1.

Virginia was ranked at No. 145 (out of 590 college and military teams) in the final rankings under the Litkenhous Difference by Score System for 1942.

== Schedule ==
Date	Time	Opponent	Site	Result	Attendance	Source
September 26		Hampden–Sydney	Scott Stadium; Charlottesville, VA	W 12–0	2,500	
October 3		at Navy	Thompson Stadium; Annapolis, MD	L 0–35	15,000	
October 10		VMI	Scott Stadium; Charlottesville, VA	L 18–38		
October 17		at Richmond	City Stadium; Richmond, VA	T 7–7	5,000	
October 24		at Lafayette	Fisher Field; Easton, PA	L 13–19	8,000	
October 31	2:30 p.m.	vs. VPI	Foreman Field; Norfolk, VA (rivalry)	L 14–20	6,000	
November 7		at Washington and Lee	Wilson Field; Lexington, VA	W 34–7	4,000	
November 14		Maryland	Scott Stadium; Charlottesville, VA (rivalry)	L 12–27	4,000	
November 21		North Carolina	Scott Stadium; Charlottesville, VA (rivalry)	L 13–28	7,000	
