= 1942 Louisiana Normal Tigers football team =

American college football season

1942 Louisiana Normal Tigers football
- Conference: Independent
- Record: 9–0
- Head coach: Eddie Robinson (2nd season)

1942 Southern college football independents records
	Conf.			Overall
Team	W	L	T	W		L		T
Louisiana Normal (Grambling)		–		9	–	0	–	0
Delaware		–		8	–	0	–	0
Mississippi Southern		–		4	–	0	–	0
Sewanee		–		1	–	0	–	0
Miami (FL)		–		7	–	2	–	0
Delaware State		–		3	–	1	–	1
Middle Tennessee State Teachers		–		4	–	2	–	1
Chattanooga		–		7	–	4	–	0
Georgetown		–		5	–	3	–	1
Navy		–		5	–	4	–	0
West Virginia		–		5	–	4	–	0
Western Maryland		–		4	–	4	–	1
Tennessee Tech		–		3	–	4	–	2
Virginia		–		2	–	6	–	1
Roanoke		–		1	–	5	–	1

The 1942 Louisiana Normal Tigers football team represented Louisiana Negro Normal and Industrial Institute—now known as Grambling State University—as an independent during the 1942 college football season. In their second season under head coach Eddie Robinson, the Tigers compiled a perfect 9–0 record, while holding every opponent scoreless. They were the last college football team to win all their games and shutout all of their opponents.

== Schedule ==
Date	Opponent	Site	Result	Source
	Tougaloo		W 42–0	
October 10	Philander Smith	Grambling, LA	W 12–0	
	Tillotson		W 18–0	
October 31	Jarvis Christian	Grambling, LA	W 77–0	
November 9	at Leland	Baker, LA	W 12–0	
November 14	Alcorn A&M		W 27–0	
unknown	unknown		W grambling won;opponent scored 0 points;score unknown	
unknown	unknown		W grambling won;opponent scored 0 points;score unknown	
unknown	unknown		W grambling won;opponent scored 0 points;score unknown	
