= Hueytown, Alabama =

City in Alabama, United States

- City
- Seal

- Location of Hueytown in Jefferson County, Alabama
- Coordinates: 33°25′56″N 86°59′45″W
- Country: United States
- State: Alabama
- County: Jefferson
- Incorporated: December 3, 1959

Area
  - Total: 20.145 sq mi (52.175 km^{2})
  - Land: 19.979 sq mi (51.746 km^{2})
  - Water: 0.166 sq mi (0.431 km^{2})
- Elevation: 548 ft (167 m)

Population (2020)
  - Total: 16,776
  - Estimate (2022): 16,369
  - Density: 819/sq mi (316.3/km^{2})
- Time zone: UTC−6 (Central (CST))
  - Summer (DST): UTC−5 (CDT)
- ZIP Code: 35023
- Area codes: 205 and 659
- FIPS code: 01-36448
- GNIS feature ID: 2404738
- Website: hueytownal.gov

Hueytown is a city in western Jefferson County, Alabama, United States. It is part of the Birmingham metropolitan area, and was part of the heavy industry development in this area in the 20th century. The population was 16,776 at the 2020 census.

In 1992 the city became known for the unexplained "Hueytown Hum", a mysterious noise later thought to be caused by large underground ventilation fans used in a nearby coal mine.

Its nearby residential and business communities were damaged by an F5 tornado on April 8, 1998 and by an EF4 tornado on April 27, 2011.

== Geography ==
According to the United States Census Bureau, the city has a total area of 20.145 square miles (52.18 km^{2}), of which 19.979 square miles (51.75 km^{2}) is land and 0.166 square miles (0.43 km^{2}), is water.

It is accessible from I-20/59 exits 112 and 115.

== Demographics ==
Historical population
| Census | Pop. | Note | %± |
|---|---|---|---|
| 1960 | 5,997 | | — |
| 1970 | 8,174 | | 36.3% |
| 1980 | 13,452 | | 64.6% |
| 1990 | 15,280 | | 13.6% |
| 2000 | 15,364 | | 0.5% |
| 2010 | 16,105 | | 4.8% |
| 2020 | 16,776 | | 4.2% |
| 2025 (est.) | 16,159 | ▼ | −3.7% |
U.S. Decennial Census; 2020 Census

=== Racial and ethnic composition ===
Hueytown city, Alabama – Racial and ethnic composition Note: the US Census treats Hispanic/Latino as an ethnic category. This table excludes Latinos from the racial categories and assigns them to a separate category. Hispanics/Latinos may be of any race.
| Race / Ethnicity (NH = Non-Hispanic) | Pop 2000 | Pop 2010 | Pop 2020 | % 2000 | % 2010 | % 2020 |
|---|---|---|---|---|---|---|
| White alone (NH) | 12,825 | 11,157 | 8,639 | 83.47% | 69.28% | 51.50% |
| Black or African American alone (NH) | 2,373 | 4,368 | 6,499 | 15.45% | 27.12% | 38.74% |
| Native American or Alaska Native alone (NH) | 22 | 41 | 32 | 0.14% | 0.25% | 0.19% |
| Asian alone (NH) | 19 | 73 | 65 | 0.12% | 0.45% | 0.39% |
| Native Hawaiian or Pacific Islander alone (NH) | 0 | 0 | 5 | 0.00% | 0.00% | 0.03% |
| Other race alone (NH) | 3 | 13 | 47 | 0.02% | 0.08% | 0.28% |
| Mixed race or Multiracial (NH) | 50 | 132 | 528 | 0.33% | 0.82% | 3.15% |
| Hispanic or Latino (any race) | 72 | 321 | 961 | 0.47% | 1.99% | 5.73% |
| Total | 15,364 | 16,105 | 16,776 | 100.00% | 100.00% | 100.00% |

=== 2020 census ===
As of the 2020 census, Hueytown had a population of 16,776 and 6,545 households, including 4,553 families. The median age was 40.3 years; 22.4% of residents were under the age of 18 and 18.8% were 65 years of age or older. For every 100 females there were 88.6 males, and for every 100 females age 18 and over there were 84.6 males age 18 and over.

80.2% of residents lived in urban areas, while 19.8% lived in rural areas.

The population density was 852.7 inhabitants per square mile (329.2/km^{2}). Of all households, 31.8% had children under the age of 18 living in them, 43.0% were married-couple households, 17.6% were households with a male householder and no spouse or partner present, and 34.3% were households with a female householder and no spouse or partner present. About 26.4% of all households were made up of individuals, and 12.3% had someone living alone who was 65 years of age or older.

There were 7,128 housing units, of which 8.2% were vacant. The homeowner vacancy rate was 1.8% and the rental vacancy rate was 8.6%.

Racial composition as of the 2020 census
| Race | Number | Percent |
|---|---|---|
| White | 8,810 | 52.5% |
| Black or African American | 6,513 | 38.8% |
| American Indian and Alaska Native | 37 | 0.2% |
| Asian | 65 | 0.4% |
| Native Hawaiian and Other Pacific Islander | 6 | 0.0% |
| Some other race | 558 | 3.3% |
| Two or more races | 787 | 4.7% |
| Hispanic or Latino (of any race) | 961 | 5.7% |

=== 2010 census ===
As of the 2010 census, there were 16,105 people, 6,412 households, and 4,517 families residing in the city. The population density was 1,388.4 inhabitants per square mile (536.1/km^{2}). There were 6,998 housing units at an average density of 603.3 per square mile (232.9/km^{2}). The racial makeup of the city was 70.0% White, 27.2% Black or African American, 0.3% Native American, 0.5% Asian, 1.1% from other races, and 1.0% from two or more races. 2.0% of the population were Hispanic or Latino of any race.

There were 6,412 households, out of which 27.5% had children under the age of 18 living with them, 50.4% were married couples living together, 15.7% had a female householder with no husband present, and 29.6% were non-families. 26.4% of all households were made up of individuals, and 11.3% had someone living alone who was 65 years of age or older. The average household size was 2.49 and the average family size was 2.99.

In the city, the population was spread out, with 22.3% under the age of 18, 7.8% from 18 to 24, 26.0% from 25 to 44, 27.4% from 45 to 64, and 16.5% who were 65 years of age or older. The median age was 40 years. For every 100 females, there were 89.5 males. For every 100 females age 18 and over, there were 92.2 males.

=== 2000 census ===
As of the 2000 census, there were 15,364 people, 6,155 households, and 4,517 families residing in the city. The population density was 1,323.7 inhabitants per square mile (511.1/km^{2}). There were 6,519 housing units at an average density of 561.7 per square mile (216.9/km^{2}). The racial makeup of the city was 83.81% White, 15.49% Black or African American, 0.14% Native American, 0.13% Asian, 0.08% from other races, and 0.34% from two or more races. 0.47% of the population were Hispanic or Latino of any race.

There were 6,155 households, out of which 29.5% had children under the age of 18 living with them, 57.8% were married couples living together, 12.3% had a female householder with no husband present, and 26.6% were non-families. 23.9% of all households were made up of individuals, and 10.9% had someone living alone who was 65 years of age or older. The average household size was 2.47 and the average family size was 2.92.

In the city, the population was spread out, with 22.2% under the age of 18, 8.6% from 18 to 24, 27.6% from 25 to 44, 24.4% from 45 to 64, and 17.2% who were 65 years of age or older. The median age was 39 years. For every 100 females, there were 90.2 males. For every 100 females age 18 and over, there were 86.4 males.

== Economy ==
The median income for a household in the city was $41,225, and the median income for a family was $49,380. Males had a median income of $36,087 versus $26,025 for females. The per capita income for the city was $19,735. About 5.3% of families and 6.8% of the population were below the poverty line, including 5.2% of those under age 18 and 9.2% of those age 65 or over.

== Industrial history ==
Although the Hueytown area has a history of farming, it has been a part of both the steel and coal mining industries in Jefferson County.

William & Joseph Woodward formed The Woodward Iron Company on New Year's Eve, 1881. With William as company president and Joseph as company secretary, the brothers purchased the plantation of Fleming Jordan. The plantation had originally been developed by his father, Mortimer Jordan, in 1828. The plantation included portions of present-day Hueytown and was one of the largest cotton plantations in the area.

On the former site of Mrs. Jordan's rose garden, Woodward Furnace No. 1 began operation on August 17, 1883. A second furnace went into blast in January 1887 and the two furnaces had a daily output of 165 tons. A mine also went into operation in the Dolomite community, which is today mostly within the City of Hueytown. By 1909, there was a third furnace and a daily capacity of 250,000 tons with a workforce of 2000 men on the payroll.

By the 1920s Woodward Iron's many expansions made it one of the nation's largest suppliers of pig iron. Joseph's son, A. H. (Rick) Woodward, had become chairman of the Board of Woodward Iron, and was one of the most prominent citizens of Alabama. He is probably best remembered as the owner of the Birmingham Barons minor league baseball team and the namesake of Rickwood Field, the nation's oldest professional baseball park still in use.

In 1968, Mead Corporation acquired Woodward Iron just as the steel industry was going into decline. In 1973, the last blast furnace closed, and Koppers Corporation bought the remaining coke production plant. Eventually, even Koppers had closed coke production as well. Much of the 1,200-acre (490 ha) site today has been re-developed for lighter industrial use.

Coal mining began about the start of the 20th century at Virginia Mines. Today this section of Hueytown contains mostly subdivisions of homes (Virginia Estates and Edenwood). However, some of the original buildings from its mining past remain, including the superintendent's house, multiple supervisors' houses, and two company-built churches.

Some source say veteran prospector Truman H. Aldrich assembled these lands as part of his extensive coal properties, others cite two red-headed brothers, George and E. T. Shuler, as having opened the Virginia Mine in 1902. Having recently arrived from Virginia City, Nevada, they named their new mine after that western city. A mine disaster in February 1905 caused extensive damage. An underground explosion, one of the worst recorded mining disasters in Alabama history, entombed the entire day crew and caved in the mine entrance. When rescuers finally cleared the 1500-foot-deep (150 m) shaft, they found 106 men dead and 20 dead mules.

In 1936, Republic Steel purchased the mine. It continued to be worked until September 1953, when it closed permanently.

== Government ==
The City of Hueytown was incorporated on December 3, 1959, and operates under a Mayor-Council form of government. The Mayor is elected to a four-year term. The five City Council members are also elected to four-year terms. Originally elected at-large, the city changed to single-member districts in the 1990s which resulted in the creation of one majority-minority council district. Neither position is term-limited.

| Mayors | Number of Terms | Year Elected | Years served |
|---|---|---|---|
| Majors Nordan | 1 | 1960 | 1960–1964 |
| Wally Watson | 1 | 1964 | 1964–1968 |
| J. P. Campbell | 1 | 1968 | 1968–1972 |
| Wade Jackson | 1 | 1972 | 1972–1976 |
| Preston E. Darden | 3 | 1976 | 1976–1988 |
| Lillian P. Howard | 2 | 1988 | 1988–1996 |
| C. C. "Bud" Newell | 1 | 1996 | 1996–1997 |
| Gerald Hicks | 1 | | 1997–2000 |
| Joe Williams | 1 | 2000 | 2000–2004 |
| Delor Baumann | 3 | 2004 | 2004–2016 |
| Steve Ware | 2 | 2016 | 2016– |

Mayor C.C. "Bud" Newell died in office. The President of the City Council, Gerald Hicks, was then elevated to the position of Mayor and completed the remaining years of the term.

The original Alderman for the City of Hueytown in 1960 were as follows:

- J. P. Campbell
- Prude T. Cowen Sr.
- Myrtle T. Durrett
- David N. Kornegay
- R. G. Wall

Listed below is a partial list (alphabetical) of former members of The City Council who were not otherwise members of the original Council.

- Richard Autry
- Allan Brown
- Ken Burns
- Gerald Bush
- Phillip Contorno (2004–2020)
- John Linden Cox (1976–1980)
- Phifer Crane (2004–2020)
- Neil Ferguson
- Jimmy Forrester
- Georgia Grey Hampton
- Gerald Hicks
- Brad Hinton (1984–1988)
- Lillian P. Howard
- JoAnn Logan (the first minority member ever elected to the council)
- Carole Marks
- Raleigh Rheuby
- Lewis Robertson
- Ray Robertson (2004–2016)
- Howard Segars
- J. B. Skates (1976–1980)
- Charles Young

== Schools and education history ==
The Hueytown area has been served by many schools over the past one hundred years. Most of these have been public schools of the Jefferson County School System which was founded in 1898. However, the first established school in the community was in August 1874, when several families gathered to build a small log building that served as both a church and school. That structure was located on the hill behind present-day Pleasant Ridge Baptist Church. A later grammar school was built on Upper Wickstead Road but burned down in 1907. The following year, Hueytown Grammar School opened with just four teachers for its 100 students. Also located across the street from Pleasant Ridge Baptist Church it faced Dabbs Avenue. The school was replaced with a larger building in 1935 which faced Hueytown Road. That entire structure burned to the ground on the night of March 3, 1949. The present Hueytown Elementary School, which has been expanded many times, first opened in the fall of 1950.

The present Hueytown Intermediate School opened to the students in the fall of 2020. (November 2 or 9)

Other schools serving the city include: Hueytown High School, Hueytown Middle School (formerly Pittman Middle School and Pittman Junior High), Concord Elementary School and North Highland Elementary School. Four private religious schools, Deeper Life Academy, Garywood Christian School, Brooklane Baptist Academy, and Rock Creek Academy are located in Hueytown.

Other schools that served Hueytown in years past have long since been closed. They included Virginia Mines School, Rosa Zinnerman Elementary, and Bell High School. When an F5 tornado destroyed Oak Grove High School and Oak Grove Elementary School on April 8, 1998, students from the Oak Grove high school grades were temporarily relocated to the former Bell School campus until their new school reopened two years later.

Recently the Hueytown High School Marching, Symphonic, and Jazz Bands have gained some prestige by playing at the Alabama Music Educators Association (AMEA) and a dual concert with the University of Alabama at Birmingham's Symphonic and Wind ensembles.

- The Hueytown High School mascot is the Golden Gophers, which came from the Minnesota Golden Gophers National Championship football team, which won the National Championship in 1960, the same year Hueytown was incorporated.

== Sports and recreation ==
The abbreviation HYT (HueYTown) has become a popular term of reference for Hueytown among some of the residents; it is constantly used for sports. (for example HYT football).

Hueytown High School's softball team has won the Alabama State Softball championship three times in four years: 2005 and 2006 as a 5A school and 2008 as a 6A school under Coach Lissa Walker. They won again in 2011 as a 5A school.

In 1974, the Hueytown High School Wrestling Team won the 4A State Championship under the guidance of then head-wrestling coach, Tony Morton.

Hueytown High School implemented its soccer program in the spring of 2014.

In addition to the public school sports programs, Hueytown offers many other community sports programs. For decades the city has enjoyed a very strong Dixie Youth Baseball program for all eligible age groups. Its Dixie Youth teams use facilities at Hueytown's Bud Newell Park and have seen several of its players eventually make it to the Major Leagues. The city also has a very strong girls fastpitch program that is based at Allison-Bonnett Girls Softball Park, also a city facility. Its Angels league All-Star team won the Dixie World Series championship in the summer of 2003 and its 6U All-Stars won the Alabama State Championship in the summer of 2009. Hueytown also has a Swim Club and a youth football program.

Hueytown also has Youth Soccer which started in 2003.

Hueytown is also home to the Central Alabama Boys & Girls Club, a multimillion-dollar facility that provides a variety of sports and recreation opportunities for the youth of the area, focusing primarily on after school and summer programs. It routinely serves more than 300 children each day.

== The Alabama Gang ==
Hueytown was home to one of the dominant racing groups in NASCAR, the Alabama Gang. The city's main thoroughfare, Allison-Bonnett Memorial Drive, takes its name from drivers Bobby Allison, Donnie Allison, Davey Allison, Clifford Allison, and Neil Bonnett. The Alabama Gang also includes racing legend Charles "Red" Farmer. Though not considered a member of The Alabama Gang, Bobby and Donnie's older brother Eddie Allison had an active role in NASCAR for many years as a respected engine builder and still resides in Hueytown.

- Bobby and Donnie Allison were originally from the Miami, Florida area; another member, Red Farmer, was a Nashville, Tennessee native but had raced in the Miami area before moving to Hueytown.

Because of its established motorsports roots, Hueytown was chosen as BMW Motorsport's initial North American base of operations before its first season with the International Motor Sports Association (IMSA) in 1975.

== Hueytown Hum ==
Beginning in late 1991 residents of Hueytown, and other nearby communities, reported hearing a droning low frequency hum at irregular intervals. The bizarre noises momentarily gained national attention and were reported in the New York Times in April 1992. In a logical conclusion town officials and many residents suspected the source of the hum was a massive $7 million mine ventilation fan with blades 26 feet (7.9 m) in diameter. From local reports and an informal investigation by ABC World News Tonight, the fan operated by Jim Walter Resources was generally thought to be the culprit. However, JWR (then owned by a subsidiary of KKR) was in bankruptcy proceedings and denied its fan was the source. Following an inconclusive series of studies the hum subsided later in the year, never to return.

== Notable people ==
- Bobby Allison, late NASCAR driver
- Davey Allison, late NASCAR driver
- Donnie Allison, former NASCAR driver
- Neil Bonnett, late NASCAR driver
- Russ Davis, baseball player
- Red Farmer, NASCAR and short track driver
- Jimmy Kitchens, former NASCAR driver
- Mark Waid, writer
- Jolynn Wilkinson, ARCA driver
- Roydell Williams, American football running back for the Florida State Seminoles
- Jameis Winston, Heisman Trophy Winner; NFL Quarterback
