= 1942 Santa Ana Army Air Base Flyers football team =

American college football season

1942 Santa Ana Army Air Base Flyers football
- Conference: Independent
- Record: 4–4
- Head coach: Garrett Arbelbide (1st season; first 3 games); Bobby Decker (1st season, final 5 games)
- Home stadium: Santa Ana Municipal Bowl

1942 military service football records
	Conf.			Overall
Team	W	L	T	W		L		T
No. 11 Second Air Force		–		11	–	0	–	1
No. 9 Manhattan Beach Coast Guard		–		6	–	0	–	1
No. 17 March Field		–		11	–	2	–	0
No. 3 Georgia Pre-Flight		–		7	–	1	–	1
No. 4 North Carolina Pre-Flight		–		8	–	2	–	1
No. 6 Jacksonville NAS		–		9	–	3	–	0
No. 1 Great Lakes Navy		–		8	–	3	–	1
No. 2 Iowa Pre-Flight		–		7	–	3	–	1
No. 15 Fort Riley		–		6	–	3	–	0
No. 14 Fort Monmouth		–		5	–	2	–	2
No. 5 Saint Mary's Pre-Flight		–		6	–	3	–	1
No. T–20 Fort Douglas		–		5	–	3	–	0
No. 10 Corpus Christi NAS		–		4	–	3	–	1
No. 16 Camp Davis		–		4	–	3	–	2
Albuquerque AAB		–		5	–	4	–	0
No. 13 Lakehurst NAS		–		4	–	4	–	1
Santa Ana AAB		–		4	–	4	–	0
Will Rogers AB		–		4	–	4	–	0
No. 7 Camp Grant		–		4	–	5	–	0
No. 8 Pensacola NAS		–		3	–	5	–	1
No. T–18 Fort Totten		–		3	–	5	–	1
Camp Pickett		–		1	–	6	–	0
No. 12 Fort Knox		–		2	–	6	–	0
Alameda Coast Guard		–		1	–	7	–	1
No. T–18 Spence Field		–		0	–	4	–	0
No. T–20 Daniel Field		–		0	–	6	–	0
Rankings from AP Service Poll

The 1942 Santa Ana Army Air Base Flyers football team represented the United States Army Air Forces's Santa Ana Army Air Base (Santa Ana AAB or SAAAB), located near Santa Ana, California, during the 1942 college football season. Garrett Arbelbide served as the team's head coach for the first three games of the season. In mid-October, he was succeeded by Lieutenant Bobby Decker, who installed a T formation offense. Marty Brill was an assistant coach for the team. Santa Ana AAB's roster included Homer Beatty, George Bernhardt, Dick Danehe, Dick Horne, Joe Margucci, and Tony Tonelli.

== Schedule ==
Date	Time	Opponent	Site	Result	Attendance	Source
September 13	2:15 p.m.	at Hollywood Bears	Gilmore Stadium; Los Angeles, CA	L 26–34	5,000	
September 27	2:15 p.m.	Los Angeles Bulldogs	Santa Ana Municipal Bowl; Santa Ana, CA	W 19–7	3,500	
October 10	2:15 p.m.	at Whittier	Hadley Field; Whittier, CA	W 27–13		
October 18	2:00 p.m.	vs. Mather Field	Ventura Junior College Stadium; Ventura, CA	W 7–0	3,000	
October 24	2:15 p.m.	at Nevada	Mackay Field; Reno, NV	L 0–3		
October 31		at Arizona State	Goodwin Stadium; Tempe, AZ	W 40–0		
November 8	2:00 p.m.	vs. Saint Mary's Pre-Flight	Los Angeles Memorial Coliseum; Los Angeles, CA	L 0–59	12,000	
November 15	2:15 p.m.	at Loyola (CA)	Gilmore Stadium; Los Angeles, CA	L 0–13	5,000	
All times are in Pacific time
