= 1942 Alameda Coast Guard Sea Lions football team =

American college football season

1942 Alameda Coast Guard Sea Lions football
- Conference: Independent
- Record: 1–7–1
- Head coach: Joe Verducci (1st season)
- Home stadium: Kezar Stadium

1942 military service football records
	Conf.			Overall
Team	W	L	T	W		L		T
No. 11 Second Air Force		–		11	–	0	–	1
No. 9 Manhattan Beach Coast Guard		–		6	–	0	–	1
No. 17 March Field		–		11	–	2	–	0
No. 3 Georgia Pre-Flight		–		7	–	1	–	1
No. 4 North Carolina Pre-Flight		–		8	–	2	–	1
No. 6 Jacksonville NAS		–		9	–	3	–	0
No. 1 Great Lakes Navy		–		8	–	3	–	1
No. 2 Iowa Pre-Flight		–		7	–	3	–	1
No. 15 Fort Riley		–		6	–	3	–	0
No. 14 Fort Monmouth		–		5	–	2	–	2
No. 5 Saint Mary's Pre-Flight		–		6	–	3	–	1
No. T–20 Fort Douglas		–		5	–	3	–	0
No. 10 Corpus Christi NAS		–		4	–	3	–	1
No. 16 Camp Davis		–		4	–	3	–	2
Albuquerque AAB		–		5	–	4	–	0
No. 13 Lakehurst NAS		–		4	–	4	–	1
Santa Ana AAB		–		4	–	4	–	0
Will Rogers AB		–		4	–	4	–	0
No. 7 Camp Grant		–		4	–	5	–	0
No. 8 Pensacola NAS		–		3	–	5	–	1
No. T–18 Fort Totten		–		3	–	5	–	1
Camp Pickett		–		1	–	6	–	0
No. 12 Fort Knox		–		2	–	6	–	0
Alameda Coast Guard		–		1	–	7	–	1
No. T–18 Spence Field		–		0	–	4	–	0
No. T–20 Daniel Field		–		0	–	6	–	0
Rankings from AP Service Poll

The 1942 Alameda Coast Guard Sea Lions football team was an American football team that represented the United States Coast Guard's Alameda Coast Guard training station during the 1942 college football season. The team compiled a 1–7–1 record. Lieutenant Joe Verducci was the coach. The team was christened as the "Sea Lions" in September 1942.

== Schedule ==
Date	Opponent	Site	Result	Attendance	Source
September 21	vs. San Francisco Packers	Seals Stadium; San Francisco, CA	L 6–7		
October 3	at University of California Ramblers	Memorial Stadium; Berkeley, CA	T 0–0		
October 10	vs. St. Mary's Pre-Flight	Kezar Stadium; San Francisco, CA	L 0–40		
October 18	at Loyola (CA)	Gilmore Stadium; Los Angeles, CA	L 6–38	10,000	
October 25	at Mather Field	Sacramento Stadium; Sacramento, CA	L 0–27		
November 1	at San Jose State	Spartan Stadium; San Jose, CA	L 0–9		
November 11	at Pacific (CA)	Baxter Stadium; Stockton, CA	W 13–7		
November 22	vs. San Francisco	Kezar Stadium; San Francisco, CA	L 6–44		
November 29	vs. Saint Mary's	Kezar Stadium; San Francisco, CA	L 0–26	2,000	
