= 1942 Camp Grant Warriors football team =

American college football season

1942 Camp Grant Warriors football
- Conference: Independent

Ranking
- AP: No. 7 (APS)
- Record: 4–5
- Head coach: Glen Rose (1st season)
- Home stadium: Bell Bowl

1942 military service football records
	Conf.			Overall
Team	W	L	T	W		L		T
No. 11 Second Air Force		–		11	–	0	–	1
No. 9 Manhattan Beach Coast Guard		–		6	–	0	–	1
No. 17 March Field		–		11	–	2	–	0
No. 3 Georgia Pre-Flight		–		7	–	1	–	1
No. 4 North Carolina Pre-Flight		–		8	–	2	–	1
No. 6 Jacksonville NAS		–		9	–	3	–	0
No. 1 Great Lakes Navy		–		8	–	3	–	1
No. 2 Iowa Pre-Flight		–		7	–	3	–	1
No. 15 Fort Riley		–		6	–	3	–	0
No. 14 Fort Monmouth		–		5	–	2	–	2
No. 5 Saint Mary's Pre-Flight		–		6	–	3	–	1
No. T–20 Fort Douglas		–		5	–	3	–	0
No. 10 Corpus Christi NAS		–		4	–	3	–	1
No. 16 Camp Davis		–		4	–	3	–	2
Albuquerque AAB		–		5	–	4	–	0
No. 13 Lakehurst NAS		–		4	–	4	–	1
Santa Ana AAB		–		4	–	4	–	0
Will Rogers AB		–		4	–	4	–	0
No. 7 Camp Grant		–		4	–	5	–	0
No. 8 Pensacola NAS		–		3	–	5	–	1
No. T–18 Fort Totten		–		3	–	5	–	1
Camp Pickett		–		1	–	6	–	0
No. 12 Fort Knox		–		2	–	6	–	0
Alameda Coast Guard		–		1	–	7	–	1
No. T–18 Spence Field		–		0	–	4	–	0
No. T–20 Daniel Field		–		0	–	6	–	0
Rankings from AP Service Poll

The 1942 Camp Grant Warriors football team represented the United States Army's Camp Grant during the 1942 college football season. In 1942, Camp Grant used for basic training and training of Army medical corpsmen. It was located in the southern outskirts of Rockford, Illinois, approximately 90 miles west of Chicago. The 1942 football team compiled a 4–5 record and was ranked No. 7 among the service teams in a poll of 91 sports writers conducted by the Associated Press.

Glen Rose, who was the head basketball coach at Arkansas before the war, was the team's head coach. Notable players included Reino Nori (quarterback, Chicago Bears), Sam Goldman (end, Washington Redskins), end Doug Renzel (end, Marquette), and Jim Cary (back, Purdue).

== Schedule ==
Date	Opponent	Site	Result	Attendance	Source
September 19	at Wisconsin	Camp Randall Stadium; Madison, WI	L 0–7		
September 26	Lake Forest		Cancelled		
October 3	Northern Illinois State	Bell Bowl; Camp Grant, IL	W 43–0	10,000	
October 10	at Iowa	Iowa Stadium; Iowa City, IA	L 16–33	9,100	
October 15	at Bradley	Peoria, IL	W 26–7		
October 31	Fort Knox	Dyche Stadium; Evanston, IL	W 20–0		
November 11	Great Lakes Navy	Bell Bowl; Camp Grant, IL	L 0–33	8,000	
November 14	St. Norbert	Bell Bowl; Camp Grant, IL	W 40–6		
November 22	at Marquette	Marquette Stadium; Milwaukee, WI	L 0–34	12,000	
November 28	Illinois	Bell Bowl; Camp Grant, IL	L 0–20	5,000	
