= 1942 Camp Davis Fighting AA's football team =

American college football season

1942 Camp Davis Fighting AA's football
- Conference: Independent

Ranking
- AP: No. 16 (APS)
- Record: 4–3–2
- Head coach: Henry A. Johnson (1st season)
- Captain: Lem Fitzgerald (quarterback)
- Home stadium: Legion Stadium

1942 military service football records
	Conf.			Overall
Team	W	L	T	W		L		T
No. 11 Second Air Force		–		11	–	0	–	1
No. 9 Manhattan Beach Coast Guard		–		6	–	0	–	1
No. 17 March Field		–		11	–	2	–	0
No. 3 Georgia Pre-Flight		–		7	–	1	–	1
No. 4 North Carolina Pre-Flight		–		8	–	2	–	1
No. 6 Jacksonville NAS		–		9	–	3	–	0
No. 1 Great Lakes Navy		–		8	–	3	–	1
No. 2 Iowa Pre-Flight		–		7	–	3	–	1
No. 15 Fort Riley		–		6	–	3	–	0
No. 14 Fort Monmouth		–		5	–	2	–	2
No. 5 Saint Mary's Pre-Flight		–		6	–	3	–	1
No. T–20 Fort Douglas		–		5	–	3	–	0
No. 10 Corpus Christi NAS		–		4	–	3	–	1
No. 16 Camp Davis		–		4	–	3	–	2
Albuquerque AAB		–		5	–	4	–	0
No. 13 Lakehurst NAS		–		4	–	4	–	1
Santa Ana AAB		–		4	–	4	–	0
Will Rogers AB		–		4	–	4	–	0
No. 7 Camp Grant		–		4	–	5	–	0
No. 8 Pensacola NAS		–		3	–	5	–	1
No. T–18 Fort Totten		–		3	–	5	–	1
Camp Pickett		–		1	–	6	–	0
No. 12 Fort Knox		–		2	–	6	–	0
Alameda Coast Guard		–		1	–	7	–	1
No. T–18 Spence Field		–		0	–	4	–	0
No. T–20 Daniel Field		–		0	–	6	–	0
Rankings from AP Service Poll

The 1942 Camp Davis Fighting AA's football team represented Camp Davis during the 1942 college football season. Led by head coach Henry A. Johnson, the Fighting AA's compiled a 4–3–2 record, outscored their opponents by a total of 119 to 104, and shut out three opponents. They were ranked No. 16 in the Associated Press post-season poll for service academies.

== Schedule ==
Date	Time	Opponent	Site	Result	Attendance	Source
September 26		at The Citadel	Johnson Hagood Stadium; Charleston, SC	L 0–32		
October 3		Appalachian State	Legion Stadium; Wilmington, NC	T 13–13	4,000	
October 10		Catawba	Legion Stadium; Wilmington, NC	L 14–21		
October 17		High Point	Legion Stadium; Wilmington, NC	W 20–0	5,000	
October 24		East Carolina	Legion Stadium; Wilmington, NC	Cancelled		
October 24	2:30 p.m.	North Carolina Pre-Flight B team	Kenan Field; Chapel Hill, NC	W 2–0	1,500+	
October 31		at Fort Story	Norfolk, VA	Cancelled		
November 7		Presbyterian	Legion Stadium; Wilmington, NC	L 6–26	5,000	
November 11		New River Marines	Legion Stadium; Wilmington, NC	Cancelled		
November 14		Cherry Point Marines	Legion Stadium; Wilmington, NC	W 37–0	4,000	
November 21		Camp Lee	Legion Stadium; Wilmington, NC	Cancelled		
November 21		Daniel Field	Legion Stadium; Wilmington, NC	W 21–6	3,000	
November 26		North Carolina reserves	Legion Stadium; Wilmington, NC	T 6–6	8,000	
