= 1942 Will Rogers Air Base Eagles football team =

American college football season

1942 Will Rogers Air Base Eagles football
- Conference: Independent
- Record: 4–4
- Head coach: E. W. Gentry (1st season)
- Home stadium: Taft Stadium

1942 military service football records
	Conf.			Overall
Team	W	L	T	W		L		T
No. 11 Second Air Force		–		11	–	0	–	1
No. 9 Manhattan Beach Coast Guard		–		6	–	0	–	1
No. 17 March Field		–		11	–	2	–	0
No. 3 Georgia Pre-Flight		–		7	–	1	–	1
No. 4 North Carolina Pre-Flight		–		8	–	2	–	1
No. 6 Jacksonville NAS		–		9	–	3	–	0
No. 1 Great Lakes Navy		–		8	–	3	–	1
No. 2 Iowa Pre-Flight		–		7	–	3	–	1
No. 15 Fort Riley		–		6	–	3	–	0
No. 14 Fort Monmouth		–		5	–	2	–	2
No. 5 Saint Mary's Pre-Flight		–		6	–	3	–	1
No. T–20 Fort Douglas		–		5	–	3	–	0
No. 10 Corpus Christi NAS		–		4	–	3	–	1
No. 16 Camp Davis		–		4	–	3	–	2
Albuquerque AAB		–		5	–	4	–	0
No. 13 Lakehurst NAS		–		4	–	4	–	1
Santa Ana AAB		–		4	–	4	–	0
Will Rogers AB		–		4	–	4	–	0
No. 7 Camp Grant		–		4	–	5	–	0
No. 8 Pensacola NAS		–		3	–	5	–	1
No. T–18 Fort Totten		–		3	–	5	–	1
Camp Pickett		–		1	–	6	–	0
No. 12 Fort Knox		–		2	–	6	–	0
Alameda Coast Guard		–		1	–	7	–	1
No. T–18 Spence Field		–		0	–	4	–	0
No. T–20 Daniel Field		–		0	–	6	–	0
Rankings from AP Service Poll

The 1942 Will Rogers Air Base Eagles football team represented the United States Army Air Forces's Will Rogers Air Base, located in Oklahoma City, during the 1942 college football season. Led by head coach E. W. Gentry, the Eagles compiled a record of 4–4.

== Schedule ==
Date	Time	Opponent	Site	Result	Attendance	Source
September 25	8:00 p.m.	at East Central	Norris Field; Ada, OK	L 13–19		
October 3		at Oklahoma freshmen	Owen Field; Norman, OK	L 0–6		
October 9	8:00 p.m.	at Central State (OK)	Central Field; Edmond, OK	L 0–28	2,000	
October 18		Fort Sill 18th Field Artillery	Taft Stadium; Oklahoma City, OK	W 13–7	3,000	
October 25	2:30 p.m.	East Central	Taft Stadium; Oklahoma City, OK	W 24–8		
		Fort Sill		W 6–0		
November 8	2:30 p.m.	Oklahoma freshmen	Taft Stadium; Oklahoma City, OK	W 12–6		
November 22		Central State (OK)	Taft Stadium; Oklahoma City, OK	L 7–27		
All times are in Central time
