= 1942 Albuquerque Army Air Base Flying Kellys football team =

American college football season

1942 Albuquerque Army Air Base Flying Kellys football
- Conference: Independent
- Record: 5–4
- Head coach: Ted Shipkey (1st season)
- Home stadium: Hilltop Stadium

1942 military service football records
	Conf.			Overall
Team	W	L	T	W		L		T
No. 11 Second Air Force		–		11	–	0	–	1
No. 9 Manhattan Beach Coast Guard		–		6	–	0	–	1
No. 17 March Field		–		11	–	2	–	0
No. 3 Georgia Pre-Flight		–		7	–	1	–	1
No. 4 North Carolina Pre-Flight		–		8	–	2	–	1
No. 6 Jacksonville NAS		–		9	–	3	–	0
No. 1 Great Lakes Navy		–		8	–	3	–	1
No. 2 Iowa Pre-Flight		–		7	–	3	–	1
No. 15 Fort Riley		–		6	–	3	–	0
No. 14 Fort Monmouth		–		5	–	2	–	2
No. 5 Saint Mary's Pre-Flight		–		6	–	3	–	1
No. T–20 Fort Douglas		–		5	–	3	–	0
No. 10 Corpus Christi NAS		–		4	–	3	–	1
No. 16 Camp Davis		–		4	–	3	–	2
Albuquerque AAB		–		5	–	4	–	0
No. 13 Lakehurst NAS		–		4	–	4	–	1
Santa Ana AAB		–		4	–	4	–	0
Will Rogers AB		–		4	–	4	–	0
No. 7 Camp Grant		–		4	–	5	–	0
No. 8 Pensacola NAS		–		3	–	5	–	1
No. T–18 Fort Totten		–		3	–	5	–	1
Camp Pickett		–		1	–	6	–	0
No. 12 Fort Knox		–		2	–	6	–	0
Alameda Coast Guard		–		1	–	7	–	1
No. T–18 Spence Field		–		0	–	4	–	0
No. T–20 Daniel Field		–		0	–	6	–	0
Rankings from AP Service Poll

The 1942 Albuquerque Army Air Base Base Flying Kellys football team, sometimes known as the Flying Colin Kellys, represented Albuquerque Army Air Base (Albuquerque AAB), located in Albuquerque, New Mexico, during the 1942 college football season. The Flying Kellys compiled a 5–4 record, not including an October 30 intra-squad game in which the starters defeated the substitutes. Captain Ted Shipkey (head coach at New Mexico before the war) was the head coach, and Ted Wright was the assistant coach. Wright served as acting head coach against Arizona State due to an injury to Shipkey.

The team utilized the "accordion shuffle shift" offense that Shipkey had developed during his tenure as head coach with the New Mexico Lobos.

The team was named after Colin Kelly, an Army aviator who was killed when his B-17 Flying Fortress was shot down in combat on December 10, 1941. The Air Base also adopted a New Mexico mountain burro as its mascot.

== Schedule ==
Date	Time	Opponent	Site	Result	Attendance	Source
September 19	8:00 p.m.	vs. New Mexico	Hilltop Stadium; Albuquerque, NM	L 6–7	9,000–10,000	
September 26		at Silver City Teachers	Silver City, NM	W 26–6		
October 3		Lubbock Army Flying School	Hilltop Stadium; Albuquerque, NM	W 12–0	4,000	
October 9		at West Texas State	Buffalo Stadium; Canyon, TX	L 13–18		
October 18		at Wichita Aero Commandos	Wichita, KS	L 3–14	2,000	
October 30		Substitutes (intra-squad game)	Hilltop Stadium; Albuquerque, NM	W 13–0		
November 11		at New Mexico A&M	Quesenberry Field; Las Cruces, NM	W 13–0		
November 15		Colorado Springs Army Air Base	Hilltop Stadium; Albuquerque, NM	W 32–0		
November 21		at Arizona State	Goodwin Stadium; Tempe, AZ	W 12–0		
November 29		San Francisco	Hilltop Stadium; Albuquerque, NM	L 0–28		
All times are in Mountain time

== Roster ==
The players included the following:

- Tiny Ahlgren, guard
- Roy Anderson, back, formerly of Fullerton High
- Ed Beddow, center, formerly of Arizona
- Red Bennett, end, formerly of Ole Miss
- W.L. "Bobby" Boblett, quarterback, formerly of West Virginia Normal
- Paul Bognar, guard
- Dick Campbell
- Church, back, formerly of California
- Jack Dungan, tackle, formerly of Arizona
- French Faucheau, guard
- Mike Gahar, tackle
- Troy "Cotton" Gann
- Gardell, guard
- Tony Gasparovich, tackle, formerly of Washington
- Newton Goss, fullback
- Reece Hill, halfback, formerly of New Mexico
- Bernie "Lefty" Honan, end, formerly of Wake Forest
- Harvey Johnson, halfback, formerly of Ole Miss or Mississippi State
- James H. Kent, tackle, formerly of Alabama
- T.E. "Tommy" Keough, halfback, formerly of Wisconsin State
- Ray Kinslow, fullback, sometimes spelled as "Kenslow"
- Ed Kintz, tackle, formerly of Puget Sound College
- Lt. Clee Maddox, back, formerly of Indiana
- Wick Malphurs
- Eddie Marshall, end, formerly of Georgia
- Charlie Mathis, guard
- Hank Morris, center
- J.O. "Bob" Nestra, halfback, formerly of Texas A&M
- "Two Ton" Polk, center
- Ralph R. "Robby" Robinette, tackle, formerly of Sul Ross
- Ted Shipkey, head coach, appeared in one play against Colorado Springs, at age 38, and injured a tendon in the back of his leg and was sent to El Paso for medical treatment
- J.R. Shoupe, end, formerly of SMU
- Vic Smith, guard,
- Dick Shoupe, end, formerly of SMU
- Lt. J.S. "Connie" Sparks, formerly of TCU
- Cecil Szepanski
- Ted Wright, assistant coach played in the Colorado Springs game on November 15 on his 32nd birthday
