= 1942 Saint Mary's Pre-Flight Air Devils football team =

American college football season

1942 Saint Mary's Pre-Flight Air Devils football
- Conference: Independent

Ranking
- AP: No. 5 (APS)
- Record: 6–3–1
- Head coach: Tex Oliver (1st season)

1942 military service football records
	Conf.			Overall
Team	W	L	T	W		L		T
No. 11 Second Air Force		–		11	–	0	–	1
No. 9 Manhattan Beach Coast Guard		–		6	–	0	–	1
No. 17 March Field		–		11	–	2	–	0
No. 3 Georgia Pre-Flight		–		7	–	1	–	1
No. 4 North Carolina Pre-Flight		–		8	–	2	–	1
No. 6 Jacksonville NAS		–		9	–	3	–	0
No. 1 Great Lakes Navy		–		8	–	3	–	1
No. 2 Iowa Pre-Flight		–		7	–	3	–	1
No. 15 Fort Riley		–		6	–	3	–	0
No. 14 Fort Monmouth		–		5	–	2	–	2
No. 5 Saint Mary's Pre-Flight		–		6	–	3	–	1
No. T–20 Fort Douglas		–		5	–	3	–	0
No. 10 Corpus Christi NAS		–		4	–	3	–	1
No. 16 Camp Davis		–		4	–	3	–	2
Albuquerque AAB		–		5	–	4	–	0
No. 13 Lakehurst NAS		–		4	–	4	–	1
Santa Ana AAB		–		4	–	4	–	0
Will Rogers AB		–		4	–	4	–	0
No. 7 Camp Grant		–		4	–	5	–	0
No. 8 Pensacola NAS		–		3	–	5	–	1
No. T–18 Fort Totten		–		3	–	5	–	1
Camp Pickett		–		1	–	6	–	0
No. 12 Fort Knox		–		2	–	6	–	0
Alameda Coast Guard		–		1	–	7	–	1
No. T–18 Spence Field		–		0	–	4	–	0
No. T–20 Daniel Field		–		0	–	6	–	0
Rankings from AP Service Poll

The 1942 Saint Mary's Pre-Flight Air Devils football team represented the United States Navy pre-flight school at Saint Mary's College of California during the 1942 college football season. The team compiled a 6–3–1 record and outscored opponents by a total of 210 to 92.

Tex Oliver was the head coach. Two members of the team were named to the 1942 All-Navy All-America football team: Joe Ruetz at right guard and Frankie Albert at quarterback. In addition, Tom Smith (right guard) and Bob Koch (right halfback) were named to the 1942 All-Navy Preflight Cadet All-America team.

== Schedule ==
Date	Time	Opponent	Site	Result	Attendance	Source
September 19		at Pacific (CA)	Baxter Stadium; Stockton, CA	W 38–9		
September 26		at Oregon	Multnomah Stadium; Portland, OR	W 10–9	10,000	
October 3		at UCLA	Los Angeles Memorial Coliseum; Los Angeles, CA	W 18–7	20,000	
October 10		vs. Alameda Coast Guard	Kezar Stadium; San Francisco, CA	W 40–0		
November 8		vs. Santa Ana AAB	Los Angeles Memorial Coliseum; Los Angeles, CA	W 59–0	12,000	
November 14		at Washington	Husky Stadium; Seattle, WA	T 0–0	7,000	
November 22		vs. No. 14 Santa Clara	Kezar Stadium; San Francisco, CA	W 13–6	25,000	
November 28		at No. 12 Stanford	Stanford Stadium; Stanford, CA	L 13–28	10,000	
December 5		at California	California Memorial Stadium; Berkeley, CA	L 6–12	20,000	
December 19		at No. 14 USC	Los Angeles Memorial Coliseum; Los Angeles, CA	L 13–21	9,000	
Rankings from AP Poll released prior to the game; All times are in Pacific time
