= Henry A. Johnson (American football) =

American football coach (1911–2003)

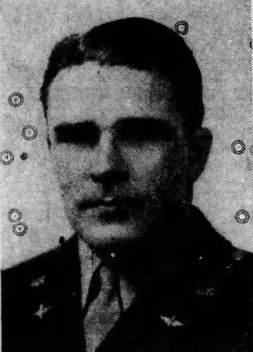
- Johnson prior to 1946.

Biographical details
- Born: October 1, 1911; White Plains, New York, U.S.
- Died: April 18, 2003 (aged 91); Tucson, Arizona, U.S.
- Education: Michigan State University (1934); International YMCA College (1939)

Playing career

Football
- 1930–1933: Michigan State

Ice hockey
- 1930–1933: Michigan State
- Positions: Halfback, quarterback (football)

Coaching career (HC unless noted)

Football
- 1934–1936?: Michigan State (assistant)
- ?–1937: Michigan State (JV) (Note: Referred to as the "B team.")
- 1938: Springfield (GA / assistant freshmen)
- 1940: Springfield (freshmen)
- 1942–1943: Camp Davis
- 1946: American International
- 1947–1950: Detroit Tech
- 1951–1963: Butler (backfield)
- 1964–1966: Kenyon

Baseball
- 1938: Springfield (JV)
- 1940: Springfield (JV)
- 1941–1943: Camp Davis
- 1947–1950: Detroit Tech
- 1964–1966: Kenyon (assistant)

Ice hockey
- 1938: Springfield
- 1940: Springfield

Administrative career (AD unless noted)
- 1939–1940: Millbrook School (NY)
- 1940–1941: Springfield (assistant AD)
- 1941: Camp Davis (acting AD) (Note: Official title was acting athletic officer.)
- 1941–1943: Camp Davis (Note: Official title was athletic officer.)
- 1946–1947: American International
- 1947–1951: Detroit Tech
- 1952–1964: Butler (assistant AD)
- 1964–1967: Kenyon

Head coaching record
- Overall: 24–55–3 (football)

Henry Anthes Johnson (October 1, 1911 – April 6, 2003) was an American college football coach. He was the head football coach for Camp Davis from 1942 to 1943, American International College in 1946, Detroit Institute of Technology from 1947 to 1950, and Kenyon College from 1964 to 1966.

== Early life and playing career ==
Johnson was born on October 1, 1911, in White Plains, New York, and grew up in Detroit. He attended Cass Technical High School and Michigan State University. While at Michigan State he was a reserve quarterback for the football team. In 1933, his senior year, he was the recipient of a reserve honor which was originated by the alumni association. The award was given to the two outstanding student-athletes who did not receive a varsity letter but were impactful nonetheless. In four years with the team, he missed a total of three days of practice which warranted his nomination for the honor.

== Coaching career ==
Immediately following Johnson's graduation he began his coaching career as an assistant for his alma mater, Michigan State. He in 1937 he was designated the head coach for the team's "B team." under head coach Charlie Bachman.

In 1938, Johnson served as Springfield's assistant freshmen coach while working on his master's degree in physical education. He left the school in 1939 to serve as the athletic director and head physical education director for the Millbrook School in Stanford, New York. After one year he returned to Springfield again as freshmen football coach and assistant athletic director. During his two separate stints at Springfield he also served as the baseball and hockey coach.

In 1942, after not coaching in 1941 due to being in the Army, Johnson took over as the athletic director and head football and baseball coach for Camp Davis. He succeeded Aaron Lazar as football coach. In 1942, he helped lead the Fighting AA's football team to a 4–3–2 record and a sixteenth overall ranking in the Associated Service Poll. In 1943, the team improved upon its previous record and finished 8–2. From 1944 to 1945 he was out of coaching due to World War II coming to an end.

In 1946, Johnson was hired as the head football coach and athletic director for American International College. It was his first coaching gig since returning from the war and was the school's first football coach since disbanding in 1943. In one season as head coach, he led the team to a 4–2–1 record. In 1947, after only one year, he was hired in the same capacity for Detroit Institute of Technology. He was also hired as the school's baseball coach. In four years as head football coach he led the team to a 6–24 record. He resigned after the 1950 season, citing the dropping of the football program as the main factor.

In 1951, Johnson joined Butler University as the backfield coach for the football team and as an assistant athletic director. After thirteen years in 1964, he was hired as the head football coach and athletic director for Kenyon College. In three seasons as head coach he led the team to an overall record of 2–24, never finishing better than 1–8. He resigned from all posts in February 1967.

== Military career ==
In 1933, Johnson was commissioned as second lieutenant due to his background with the Reserve Officers' Training Corps (ROTC). In 1936, he earned the rank of first lieutenant. In June 1941, he was stationed at the Marine Corps Outlying Field Camp Davis, simply Camp Davis, where he was the acting athletic officer and motor transportation officer with the 100th C. A. regiment. After three months, in September 1941, Johnson officially took over the post of athletic officer. In July 1942, after a little over a year at Camp Davis, he earned the rank of captain. After another year he was promoted once again, this time to the rank of major. In 1945, he was stationed in the Pacific War with the Army and Air Force. Prior to being discharged in March 1946, Johnson reached the rank of lieutenant colonel.

== Personal life ==
In August 1940, Johnson married Dorothy Hasselbring at Michigan State University's chapel. Together they had two children.

Johnson died in Hudgel's Swan Funeral Home in Tucson, Arizona, on April 6, 2003, less than three months after his wife.

== Head coaching record ==
=== Football ===
Year	Team	Overall	Conference	Standing	Bowl/playoffs	APS^{#}
Camp Davis Fighting AA's (Independent) (1942–1943)
1942	Camp Davis	4–3–2				16
1943	Camp Davis	8–2				
Camp Davis:		12–5–2				
American International Yellow Jackets (Independent) (1946)
1946	American International	4–2–1				
American International:		4–2–1				
Detroit Tech Dynamics (Independent) (1947–1950)
1947	Detroit Tech	0–7				
1948	Detroit Tech	3–5				
1949	Detroit Tech	2–6				
1950	Detroit Tech	1–6				
Detroit Tech:		6–24				
Kenyon Lords (Ohio Athletic Conference) (1964–1966)
1964	Kenyon	0–8	0–6	15th		
1965	Kenyon	1–8	0–5	T–14th		
1966	Kenyon	1–8	0–5	14th		
Kenyon:		2–24	0–16			
Total:		24–55–3				
^{#}Ranking from final AP Service poll.
