= 1942 Fort Douglas MPs football team =

American college football season

1942 Fort Douglas MPs football
- Conference: Independent

Ranking
- AP: No. 20 (APS)
- Record: 5–3
- Head coach: Murray Maughan

1942 military service football records
	Conf.			Overall
Team	W	L	T	W		L		T
No. 11 Second Air Force		–		11	–	0	–	1
No. 9 Manhattan Beach Coast Guard		–		6	–	0	–	1
No. 17 March Field		–		11	–	2	–	0
No. 3 Georgia Pre-Flight		–		7	–	1	–	1
No. 4 North Carolina Pre-Flight		–		8	–	2	–	1
No. 6 Jacksonville NAS		–		9	–	3	–	0
No. 1 Great Lakes Navy		–		8	–	3	–	1
No. 2 Iowa Pre-Flight		–		7	–	3	–	1
No. 15 Fort Riley		–		6	–	3	–	0
No. 14 Fort Monmouth		–		5	–	2	–	2
No. 5 Saint Mary's Pre-Flight		–		6	–	3	–	1
No. T–20 Fort Douglas		–		5	–	3	–	0
No. 10 Corpus Christi NAS		–		4	–	3	–	1
No. 16 Camp Davis		–		4	–	3	–	2
Albuquerque AAB		–		5	–	4	–	0
No. 13 Lakehurst NAS		–		4	–	4	–	1
Santa Ana AAB		–		4	–	4	–	0
Will Rogers AB		–		4	–	4	–	0
No. 7 Camp Grant		–		4	–	5	–	0
No. 8 Pensacola NAS		–		3	–	5	–	1
No. T–18 Fort Totten		–		3	–	5	–	1
Camp Pickett		–		1	–	6	–	0
No. 12 Fort Knox		–		2	–	6	–	0
Alameda Coast Guard		–		1	–	7	–	1
No. T–18 Spence Field		–		0	–	4	–	0
No. T–20 Daniel Field		–		0	–	6	–	0
Rankings from AP Service Poll

The 1942 Fort Douglas MPs football team represented Fort Douglas during the 1942 college football season. Under the coaching of a former Utah football player, Murray Maughan, the MPs (members of the Military Police Corps) compiled a 5–3 record, although they were outscored by their opponents by a total of 174 to 159. On a December 2 AP Poll for the ranking of service academies, Fort Douglas received a single tenth place vote, good enough to place them at No. 20 alongside Daniel Field and Camp Shelby.

== Schedule ==
Date	Time	Opponent	Site	Result	Attendance	Source
September 25	8:00 p.m.	at Weber Junior College	Ogden Stadium; Ogden, UT	W 45–0	1,500	
October 5		at Logan Navy-Marines	Ogden Stadium; Ogden, UT	W 12–7	800	
October 10		at Second Air Force	Wendover, UT	L 0–37	1,200	
October 16		at BYU	Provo, UT	W 24–13	3,000+	
October 23		Utah State	Aggie Stadium; Logan, UT	L 7–49	1,000	
October 31	2:00 p.m.	Denver	DU Stadium; Denver, CO	L 6–44		
November 11		Hill Field	Ute Stadium; Salt Lake City, UT	W 26–7	2,000	
November 14	2:30 p.m.	Idaho Southern Branch	Ute Stadium; Salt Lake City, UT	W 39–17	1,000	
November 26		at Hill Field	Ogden Municipal Stadium; Ogden, UT	Cancelled		
