= 1942 Fort Riley Centaurs football team =

American college football season

1942 Fort Riley Centaurs football
- Conference: Independent

Ranking
- AP: No. 15 (APS)
- Record: 6–3
- Head coach: Curry N. Vaughn (1st season)

1942 military service football records
	Conf.			Overall
Team	W	L	T	W		L		T
No. 11 Second Air Force		–		11	–	0	–	1
No. 9 Manhattan Beach Coast Guard		–		6	–	0	–	1
No. 17 March Field		–		11	–	2	–	0
No. 3 Georgia Pre-Flight		–		7	–	1	–	1
No. 4 North Carolina Pre-Flight		–		8	–	2	–	1
No. 6 Jacksonville NAS		–		9	–	3	–	0
No. 1 Great Lakes Navy		–		8	–	3	–	1
No. 2 Iowa Pre-Flight		–		7	–	3	–	1
No. 15 Fort Riley		–		6	–	3	–	0
No. 14 Fort Monmouth		–		5	–	2	–	2
No. 5 Saint Mary's Pre-Flight		–		6	–	3	–	1
No. T–20 Fort Douglas		–		5	–	3	–	0
No. 10 Corpus Christi NAS		–		4	–	3	–	1
No. 16 Camp Davis		–		4	–	3	–	2
Albuquerque AAB		–		5	–	4	–	0
No. 13 Lakehurst NAS		–		4	–	4	–	1
Santa Ana AAB		–		4	–	4	–	0
Will Rogers AB		–		4	–	4	–	0
No. 7 Camp Grant		–		4	–	5	–	0
No. 8 Pensacola NAS		–		3	–	5	–	1
No. T–18 Fort Totten		–		3	–	5	–	1
Camp Pickett		–		1	–	6	–	0
No. 12 Fort Knox		–		2	–	6	–	0
Alameda Coast Guard		–		1	–	7	–	1
No. T–18 Spence Field		–		0	–	4	–	0
No. T–20 Daniel Field		–		0	–	6	–	0
Rankings from AP Service Poll

The 1942 Fort Riley Centaurs football team represented the Cavalry Replacement Training Center at Fort Riley, a United States Army installation located in North Central Kansas, during the 1942 college football season. The team compiled a 6–3 record, including a victory over Kansas State. Lt. Curry N. Vaughn was the team's head coach.

Fort Riley also garnered attention in the fall of 1942 as the home base of boxer Joe Louis.

== Schedule ==
Date	Opponent	Site	Result	Attendance	Source
September 19	vs. Missouri	Central High School Stadium; St. Joseph, MO	L 0–31		
September 26	Emporia State	Junction City, KS	W 39–14		
October 3	at Kansas State	Memorial Stadium; Manhattan, KS	W 21–7		
October 11	at Creighton	Creighton Stadium; Omaha, NE	L 7–34		
October 16	Missouri "B" team	Fort Riley, KS	W 13–6		
October 24	at Wichita	Wichita, KS	W 6–0	3,000	
November 1	at Wichita Aero Commandos	Lawrence Stadium; Wichita, KS	W 10–0		
November 11	Second Air Force	Topeka, KS	L 6–54		
November 26	Kansas Wesleyan		W 39–6		
