= 1942 March Field Flyers football team =

American college football season

1942 March Field Flyers football
- Conference: Independent

Ranking
- AP: No. 17 (APS)
- Record: 11–2
- Head coach: Paul J. Schissler (1st season)
- Home stadium: Orange Show Stadium, Wheelock Field

1942 military service football records
	Conf.			Overall
Team	W	L	T	W		L		T
No. 11 Second Air Force		–		11	–	0	–	1
No. 9 Manhattan Beach Coast Guard		–		6	–	0	–	1
No. 17 March Field		–		11	–	2	–	0
No. 3 Georgia Pre-Flight		–		7	–	1	–	1
No. 4 North Carolina Pre-Flight		–		8	–	2	–	1
No. 6 Jacksonville NAS		–		9	–	3	–	0
No. 1 Great Lakes Navy		–		8	–	3	–	1
No. 2 Iowa Pre-Flight		–		7	–	3	–	1
No. 15 Fort Riley		–		6	–	3	–	0
No. 14 Fort Monmouth		–		5	–	2	–	2
No. 5 Saint Mary's Pre-Flight		–		6	–	3	–	1
No. T–20 Fort Douglas		–		5	–	3	–	0
No. 10 Corpus Christi NAS		–		4	–	3	–	1
No. 16 Camp Davis		–		4	–	3	–	2
Albuquerque AAB		–		5	–	4	–	0
No. 13 Lakehurst NAS		–		4	–	4	–	1
Santa Ana AAB		–		4	–	4	–	0
Will Rogers AB		–		4	–	4	–	0
No. 7 Camp Grant		–		4	–	5	–	0
No. 8 Pensacola NAS		–		3	–	5	–	1
No. T–18 Fort Totten		–		3	–	5	–	1
Camp Pickett		–		1	–	6	–	0
No. 12 Fort Knox		–		2	–	6	–	0
Alameda Coast Guard		–		1	–	7	–	1
No. T–18 Spence Field		–		0	–	4	–	0
No. T–20 Daniel Field		–		0	–	6	–	0
Rankings from AP Service Poll

The 1942 March Field Flyers football team represented the United States Army Air Forces' Fourth Air Force stationed at March Field during the 1942 college football season. The base was located in Riverside, California. Led by head coach Paul J. Schissler, the Flyers compiled a record of 11–2.

== Schedule ==
Date	Time	Opponent	Site	Result	Attendance	Source
October 4	2:15 p.m.	March Field Bombers	Orange Show Stadium; San Bernardino, CA	W 14–0		
October 10		Redlands	Orange Show Stadium; San Bernardino, CA	W 25–14		
October 18		at Fresno State	Ratcliffe Stadium; Fresno, CA	L 0–20	10,000	
October 25		at San Diego State	Aztec Bowl; San Diego, CA	W 39–6		
November 1		Los Alamitos NAB	Orange Show Stadium; San Bernardino, CA	W 47–0		
November 8		Mather Field AAB	Orange Show Stadium; San Bernardino, CA	W 21–3		
November 15		at San Diego Bombers	San Diego, CA	W 33–12		
November 22	2:15 p.m.	San Diego NTS	Orange Show Stadium; San Bernardino, CA	W 21–3		
November 29		Santa Ana AAB	Orange Show Stadium; San Bernardino, CA	W 16–7		
December 13		Hollywood Bears	Wheelock Field; Riverside, CA	W 19–6	5,000	
December 20		vs. Second Air Force	Gilmore Stadium; Los Angeles, CA	L 13–26	7,000	
December 27		vs. Hollywood Bears / Los Angeles Bulldogs	Gilmore Stadium; Los Angeles, CA	W 14–12	10,000	
January 3		at San Diego Bombers	San Diego, CA (Victory Bowl)	W 28–14	15,000	
All times are in Pacific time
