= 1942 Jacksonville Naval Air Station Fliers football team =

American college football season

1942 Jacksonville Naval Air Station Fliers football
- Conference: Independent

Ranking
- AP: No. 6 (APS)
- Record: 9–3
- Head coach: Hobbs Adams (1st season)
- Home stadium: Mason Field

1942 military service football records
	Conf.			Overall
Team	W	L	T	W		L		T
No. 11 Second Air Force		–		11	–	0	–	1
No. 9 Manhattan Beach Coast Guard		–		6	–	0	–	1
No. 17 March Field		–		11	–	2	–	0
No. 3 Georgia Pre-Flight		–		7	–	1	–	1
No. 4 North Carolina Pre-Flight		–		8	–	2	–	1
No. 6 Jacksonville NAS		–		9	–	3	–	0
No. 1 Great Lakes Navy		–		8	–	3	–	1
No. 2 Iowa Pre-Flight		–		7	–	3	–	1
No. 15 Fort Riley		–		6	–	3	–	0
No. 14 Fort Monmouth		–		5	–	2	–	2
No. 5 Saint Mary's Pre-Flight		–		6	–	3	–	1
No. T–20 Fort Douglas		–		5	–	3	–	0
No. 10 Corpus Christi NAS		–		4	–	3	–	1
No. 16 Camp Davis		–		4	–	3	–	2
Albuquerque AAB		–		5	–	4	–	0
No. 13 Lakehurst NAS		–		4	–	4	–	1
Santa Ana AAB		–		4	–	4	–	0
Will Rogers AB		–		4	–	4	–	0
No. 7 Camp Grant		–		4	–	5	–	0
No. 8 Pensacola NAS		–		3	–	5	–	1
No. T–18 Fort Totten		–		3	–	5	–	1
Camp Pickett		–		1	–	6	–	0
No. 12 Fort Knox		–		2	–	6	–	0
Alameda Coast Guard		–		1	–	7	–	1
No. T–18 Spence Field		–		0	–	4	–	0
No. T–20 Daniel Field		–		0	–	6	–	0
Rankings from AP Service Poll

The 1942 Jacksonville Naval Air Station Fliers football team represented the Jacksonville Naval Air Station during the 1942 college football season. The team compiled a 9–3 record and outscored opponents 232 to 76. The team was ranked No. 6 among the service teams in a poll of 91 sports writers conducted by the Associated Press.

The team's head coach was Hobbs Adams, who coached at Kansas State before the war. Key players included George McAfee (halfback, Chicago Bears), Ray Terrell (halfback, Ole Miss), George Faust (Minnesota), Bill Borcher (Oregon), Vic Fusia (Manhattan), and Bill Chipley. McAfee was selected as the right halfback on the 1942 All-Navy All-America football team.

== Schedule ==
Date	Opponent	Site	Result	Attendance	Source
September 19	vs. Florida	Fairfield Stadium; Jacksonville, FL	W 20–7	8,500	
September 25	vs. Georgia	Municipal Stadium; Macon, GA	L 0–14	11,000	
October 3	at Miami (FL)	Burdine Stadium; Miami, FL	W 14–0	9,333	
October 11	Spence Field	Mason Field; Jacksonville, FL	W 33–0		
October 18	Daniel Field	Mason Field; Jacksonville, FL	W 55–0		
October 25	Tampa	Mason Field; Jacksonville, FL	W 26–0	3,500	
October 30	at Georgia Pre-Flight	Sanford Stadium; Athens, GA	L 6–20	7,000	
November 8	at Rollins	Mason Field; Jacksonville, FL	L 6–13		
November 14	Clemson	Mason Field; Jacksonville, FL	W 24–6	5,000	
November 21	at Pensacola NAS	Air Station Field; Pensacola, FL	W 16–10	4,000	
November 28	Duke	Jacksonville, FL	W 13–0	7,500	
December 5	at Spence Field		W 19–6		
