= 1942 Corpus Christi Naval Air Station Comets football team =

American college football season

1942 Corpus Christi Naval Air Station Comets football
- Conference: Independent

Ranking
- AP: No. 10 (APS)
- Record: 4–3–1
- Head coach: Marty Karow (1st season)

1942 military service football records
	Conf.			Overall
Team	W	L	T	W		L		T
No. 11 Second Air Force		–		11	–	0	–	1
No. 9 Manhattan Beach Coast Guard		–		6	–	0	–	1
No. 17 March Field		–		11	–	2	–	0
No. 3 Georgia Pre-Flight		–		7	–	1	–	1
No. 4 North Carolina Pre-Flight		–		8	–	2	–	1
No. 6 Jacksonville NAS		–		9	–	3	–	0
No. 1 Great Lakes Navy		–		8	–	3	–	1
No. 2 Iowa Pre-Flight		–		7	–	3	–	1
No. 15 Fort Riley		–		6	–	3	–	0
No. 14 Fort Monmouth		–		5	–	2	–	2
No. 5 Saint Mary's Pre-Flight		–		6	–	3	–	1
No. T–20 Fort Douglas		–		5	–	3	–	0
No. 10 Corpus Christi NAS		–		4	–	3	–	1
No. 16 Camp Davis		–		4	–	3	–	2
Albuquerque AAB		–		5	–	4	–	0
No. 13 Lakehurst NAS		–		4	–	4	–	1
Santa Ana AAB		–		4	–	4	–	0
Will Rogers AB		–		4	–	4	–	0
No. 7 Camp Grant		–		4	–	5	–	0
No. 8 Pensacola NAS		–		3	–	5	–	1
No. T–18 Fort Totten		–		3	–	5	–	1
Camp Pickett		–		1	–	6	–	0
No. 12 Fort Knox		–		2	–	6	–	0
Alameda Coast Guard		–		1	–	7	–	1
No. T–18 Spence Field		–		0	–	4	–	0
No. T–20 Daniel Field		–		0	–	6	–	0
Rankings from AP Service Poll

The 1942 Corpus Christi Naval Air Station Comets football team represented the United States Navy's Naval Air Station Corpus Christi during the 1942 college football season. The team compiled a 4–3–1 record and was ranked No. 10 among the service teams in a poll of 91 sports writers conducted by the Associated Press. Corpus Christi played four games against college teams from the Southwest Conference, including conference champion Texas, and four games against other service teams.

Marty Karow was the head coach. Notable players included: halfback George Franck, who was later inducted into the College Football Hall of Fame; end Billy Dewell, who played for the Chicago Cardinals before the war; and end Ed Frutig, who played for Michigan and the Green Bay Packers before the war. Frutig was selected as the right end on the 1942 All-Navy All-America football team.

"Ike" Kepford, who later shot down 17 enemy aircraft to become the Navy's leading flying ace, scored both of the Comets' touchdowns against Texas A&M, one on an interception return and the other on a pass reception.

== Schedule ==
Date	Opponent	Site	Result	Attendance	Source
September 19	at Texas	War Memorial Stadium; Austin, TX	L 0–40		
September 26	at Rice	Rice Field; Houston, TX	L 7–18	9,000	
October 10	Texas A&M	Corpus Christi, TX	W 18–7		
October 17	Ellington Field	Corpus Christi, TX	W 75–0		
October 24	at SMU	Dallas, TX	L 6–21		
October 31	Pensacola NAS	Corpus Christi, TX	W 18–6		
November 7	Randolph Field	Corpus Christi, TX	W 40–0		
November 14	at Pensacola NAS	Pensacola, FL	T 7–7	5,000	
