= 1942 Fort Totten Redlegs football team =

American college football season

1942 Fort Totten Redlegs football
- Conference: Independent

Ranking
- AP: No. 18 (APS)
- Record: 3–5–1
- Head coach: Dan Grody (1st season)

1942 military service football records
	Conf.			Overall
Team	W	L	T	W		L		T
No. 11 Second Air Force		–		11	–	0	–	1
No. 9 Manhattan Beach Coast Guard		–		6	–	0	–	1
No. 17 March Field		–		11	–	2	–	0
No. 3 Georgia Pre-Flight		–		7	–	1	–	1
No. 4 North Carolina Pre-Flight		–		8	–	2	–	1
No. 6 Jacksonville NAS		–		9	–	3	–	0
No. 1 Great Lakes Navy		–		8	–	3	–	1
No. 2 Iowa Pre-Flight		–		7	–	3	–	1
No. 15 Fort Riley		–		6	–	3	–	0
No. 14 Fort Monmouth		–		5	–	2	–	2
No. 5 Saint Mary's Pre-Flight		–		6	–	3	–	1
No. T–20 Fort Douglas		–		5	–	3	–	0
No. 10 Corpus Christi NAS		–		4	–	3	–	1
No. 16 Camp Davis		–		4	–	3	–	2
Albuquerque AAB		–		5	–	4	–	0
No. 13 Lakehurst NAS		–		4	–	4	–	1
Santa Ana AAB		–		4	–	4	–	0
Will Rogers AB		–		4	–	4	–	0
No. 7 Camp Grant		–		4	–	5	–	0
No. 8 Pensacola NAS		–		3	–	5	–	1
No. T–18 Fort Totten		–		3	–	5	–	1
Camp Pickett		–		1	–	6	–	0
No. 12 Fort Knox		–		2	–	6	–	0
Alameda Coast Guard		–		1	–	7	–	1
No. T–18 Spence Field		–		0	–	4	–	0
No. T–20 Daniel Field		–		0	–	6	–	0
Rankings from AP Service Poll

The 1942 Fort Totten Redlegs football team represented Fort Totten during the 1942 college football season. The Redlegs compiled a 3–5–1 record, and were ranked No. 18 in the Associated Press post-season poll for service teams. There was some debate about Fort Totten's overall record for the 1942, with multiple sources citing the team had five wins and three losses prior to their contest with Fort Monmouth, and one specifying the team with four wins and three losses. However, the accounts must be incorrect, given Totten's confirmed tie against Hartwick College at the beginning of the season, and that most accounts recognize the Fort played eight games before Fort Monmouth, which corroborates with the verified number of games for the season.

== Schedule ==
Date	Time	Opponent	Site	Result	Attendance	Source
September 26		at Hartwick	Oneonta, NY	T 6–6	700	
October 3		at Brooklyn	Kingsmen's Field; Brooklyn, NY	W 27–7		
October 10		at Holy Cross	Fitton Field; Worcester, MA	L 0–60	6,000	
October 18		at St. Bonaventure	Bradner Stadium; Olean, NY	L 0–7	2,000	
October 25		at Canisius	Buffalo, NY	L 7–14	5,882	
November 3	2:00 p.m.	at CCNY	Lewisohn Stadium; New York, NY	W 51–0		
November 8		at Scranton	Scranton Stadium; Scranton, PA	L 6–13	2,000	
November 22		at Fort Hamilton	Union City, NJ	W 39–7		
November 29	2:30 p.m.	at Fort Monmouth	Frawley Field; Fort Monmouth, NJ (Second corps area championship)	L 0–6		
