= 1942 Daniel Field Eagles football team =

American college football season

1942 Daniel Field Eagles football
- Conference: Independent

Ranking
- AP: No. 20 (APS)
- Record: 0–6
- Head coach: Marion Bird (1st season)

1942 military service football records
	Conf.			Overall
Team	W	L	T	W		L		T
No. 11 Second Air Force		–		11	–	0	–	1
No. 9 Manhattan Beach Coast Guard		–		6	–	0	–	1
No. 17 March Field		–		11	–	2	–	0
No. 3 Georgia Pre-Flight		–		7	–	1	–	1
No. 4 North Carolina Pre-Flight		–		8	–	2	–	1
No. 6 Jacksonville NAS		–		9	–	3	–	0
No. 1 Great Lakes Navy		–		8	–	3	–	1
No. 2 Iowa Pre-Flight		–		7	–	3	–	1
No. 15 Fort Riley		–		6	–	3	–	0
No. 14 Fort Monmouth		–		5	–	2	–	2
No. 5 Saint Mary's Pre-Flight		–		6	–	3	–	1
No. T–20 Fort Douglas		–		5	–	3	–	0
No. 10 Corpus Christi NAS		–		4	–	3	–	1
No. 16 Camp Davis		–		4	–	3	–	2
Albuquerque AAB		–		5	–	4	–	0
No. 13 Lakehurst NAS		–		4	–	4	–	1
Santa Ana AAB		–		4	–	4	–	0
Will Rogers AB		–		4	–	4	–	0
No. 7 Camp Grant		–		4	–	5	–	0
No. 8 Pensacola NAS		–		3	–	5	–	1
No. T–18 Fort Totten		–		3	–	5	–	1
Camp Pickett		–		1	–	6	–	0
No. 12 Fort Knox		–		2	–	6	–	0
Alameda Coast Guard		–		1	–	7	–	1
No. T–18 Spence Field		–		0	–	4	–	0
No. T–20 Daniel Field		–		0	–	6	–	0
Rankings from AP Service Poll

The 1942 Daniel Field Eagles football team represented Daniel Field during the 1942 college football season. Coached by Marion Bird, the Eagles compiled at least a 0–6 record, and of the known games were outscored by a total of 123 to 12. Much of Daniel Field's 1942 season is not well recorded, and it is possible, or even probable that the Army Air Field team played an extended schedule as opposed to the one reported throughout the newspapers of the time. In a special Associated Press poll for the rankings of military service football teams for the 1942 season, Daniel Field received a single vote from the 91 sportswriters present, to result in a tie for No. 20 with Fort Douglas and Camp Shelby.

== Schedule ==
Date	Time	Opponent	Site	Result	Attendance	Source
September 25		South Carolina freshmen		L 0–42		
October 4	2:30 p.m.	at Fort Benning	Doughboy Stadium; Columbus, GA	L 0–12	8,000	
October 10?				L		
October 18		at Jacksonville NAS	Mason Field; Jacksonville, FL	L 0–55		
November 13	2:30 p.m.	at Presbyterian	Clinton, SC	L 6–27		
November 21		at Camp Davis	Legion Stadium; Wilmington, NC	L 6–21	3,000	
