= 1942 Pensacola Naval Air Station Goslings football team =

American college football season

1942 Pensacola Naval Air Station Goslings football
- Conference: Independent

Ranking
- AP: No. 8 (APS)
- Record: 3–5–1
- Head coach: George Clark (1st season)
- Home stadium: Air Station Field

1942 military service football records
	Conf.			Overall
Team	W	L	T	W		L		T
No. 11 Second Air Force		–		11	–	0	–	1
No. 9 Manhattan Beach Coast Guard		–		6	–	0	–	1
No. 17 March Field		–		11	–	2	–	0
No. 3 Georgia Pre-Flight		–		7	–	1	–	1
No. 4 North Carolina Pre-Flight		–		8	–	2	–	1
No. 6 Jacksonville NAS		–		9	–	3	–	0
No. 1 Great Lakes Navy		–		8	–	3	–	1
No. 2 Iowa Pre-Flight		–		7	–	3	–	1
No. 15 Fort Riley		–		6	–	3	–	0
No. 14 Fort Monmouth		–		5	–	2	–	2
No. 5 Saint Mary's Pre-Flight		–		6	–	3	–	1
No. T–20 Fort Douglas		–		5	–	3	–	0
No. 10 Corpus Christi NAS		–		4	–	3	–	1
No. 16 Camp Davis		–		4	–	3	–	2
Albuquerque AAB		–		5	–	4	–	0
No. 13 Lakehurst NAS		–		4	–	4	–	1
Santa Ana AAB		–		4	–	4	–	0
Will Rogers AB		–		4	–	4	–	0
No. 7 Camp Grant		–		4	–	5	–	0
No. 8 Pensacola NAS		–		3	–	5	–	1
No. T–18 Fort Totten		–		3	–	5	–	1
Camp Pickett		–		1	–	6	–	0
No. 12 Fort Knox		–		2	–	6	–	0
Alameda Coast Guard		–		1	–	7	–	1
No. T–18 Spence Field		–		0	–	4	–	0
No. T–20 Daniel Field		–		0	–	6	–	0
Rankings from AP Service Poll

The 1942 Pensacola Naval Air Station Goslings football team represented the Pensacola Naval Air Station during the 1942 college football season. The team compiled a 3–5–1 record and was ranked No. 8 among the service teams in a poll of 91 sports writers conducted by the Associated Press.

The team's head coach was George Clark. The team's roster included Jim Birr, Bill Leckonby George Sauer, Don Clawson, Ben McLeod, and Rep Whalen.

== Schedule ==
Date	Opponent	Site	Result	Attendance	Source
September 26	Southeastern Louisiana	Air Station Field; Pensacola, FL	W 13–0		
October 4	Spence Field	Air Station Field; Pensacola, FL	W 75–0		
October 10	at Alabama	Murphy High School Stadium; Mobile, AL	L 0–27	8,000–10,000	
October 17	Georgia Pre-Flight	Pensacola, FL	L 0–26	4,000	
October 24	No. 12 TCU	Pensacola, FL	L 0–21	5,000	
October 31	at Corpus Christi NAS	Corpus Christi, TX	L 6–18		
November 8	at Fort Benning	Fort Benning, GA	W 35–7	15,000	
November 14	Corpus Christi NAS	Pensacola, FL	T 7–7	5,000	
November 21	Jacksonville NAS	Air Station Field; Pensacola, FL	L 0–16	4,000	
Rankings from Coaches' Poll released prior to the game
