= 1942 Spence Field Fliers football team =

American college football season

1942 Spence Field Fliers football
- Conference: Independent

Ranking
- AP: No. 18 (APS)
- Record: 0–4
- Head coach: R. I. Roberts

1942 military service football records
	Conf.			Overall
Team	W	L	T	W		L		T
No. 11 Second Air Force		–		11	–	0	–	1
No. 9 Manhattan Beach Coast Guard		–		6	–	0	–	1
No. 17 March Field		–		11	–	2	–	0
No. 3 Georgia Pre-Flight		–		7	–	1	–	1
No. 4 North Carolina Pre-Flight		–		8	–	2	–	1
No. 6 Jacksonville NAS		–		9	–	3	–	0
No. 1 Great Lakes Navy		–		8	–	3	–	1
No. 2 Iowa Pre-Flight		–		7	–	3	–	1
No. 15 Fort Riley		–		6	–	3	–	0
No. 14 Fort Monmouth		–		5	–	2	–	2
No. 5 Saint Mary's Pre-Flight		–		6	–	3	–	1
No. T–20 Fort Douglas		–		5	–	3	–	0
No. 10 Corpus Christi NAS		–		4	–	3	–	1
No. 16 Camp Davis		–		4	–	3	–	2
Albuquerque AAB		–		5	–	4	–	0
No. 13 Lakehurst NAS		–		4	–	4	–	1
Santa Ana AAB		–		4	–	4	–	0
Will Rogers AB		–		4	–	4	–	0
No. 7 Camp Grant		–		4	–	5	–	0
No. 8 Pensacola NAS		–		3	–	5	–	1
No. T–18 Fort Totten		–		3	–	5	–	1
Camp Pickett		–		1	–	6	–	0
No. 12 Fort Knox		–		2	–	6	–	0
Alameda Coast Guard		–		1	–	7	–	1
No. T–18 Spence Field		–		0	–	4	–	0
No. T–20 Daniel Field		–		0	–	6	–	0
Rankings from AP Service Poll

The 1942 Spence Field Fliers football team represented Spence Air Base during the 1942 college football season. Under Lieutenant R. I. Roberts, the Fliers compiled at least a 0–4 record, and were outscored by their opponents by at least a total of 134 to 6. Much information on the 1942 Spence Army Air Field team is unknown, and there are only scattered primary sources that outline the season and results for the football team. A few games can be verified as cancelled because teams like the 29th Infantry were already fighting in Europe by the time they were scheduled to play the air base, but others are completely unknown. Another game that is yet to be verified by any primary sources was against Jacksonville NAS on December 5.

== Schedule ==
Date	Opponent	Site	Result	Source
September 27?	Fort Benning		L 0–7	
October 4	at Pensacola NAS	Air Station Field; Pensacola, FL	L 0–75	
October 11	at Jacksonville NAS	Mason Field; Jacksonville, FL	L 0–33	
October 18	124th Infantry	Moultrie, GA	Unknown	
October 25	at Daniel Field	Augusta, GA	Unknown	
November 15	29th Infantry	Moultrie, GA	Cancelled	
November 29	124th Infantry	Fort Benning, GA	Canceled	
December 5	Jacksonville NAS	Moultrie, GA	L 6–19	
December 6	Daniel Field	Moultrie, GA	Unknown	
