= 1942 Fort Monmouth Signalmen football team =

American college football season

1942 Fort Monmouth Signalmen football

Mythical Second Army Corps Area champions
- Conference: Independent

Ranking
- AP: No. 14 (APS)
- Record: 5–2–2
- Head coach: Auggie Bossu (1st season)
- Captain: Frank Gnup (quarterback)
- Home stadium: Frawley Field

1942 military service football records
	Conf.			Overall
Team	W	L	T	W		L		T
No. 11 Second Air Force		–		11	–	0	–	1
No. 9 Manhattan Beach Coast Guard		–		6	–	0	–	1
No. 17 March Field		–		11	–	2	–	0
No. 3 Georgia Pre-Flight		–		7	–	1	–	1
No. 4 North Carolina Pre-Flight		–		8	–	2	–	1
No. 6 Jacksonville NAS		–		9	–	3	–	0
No. 1 Great Lakes Navy		–		8	–	3	–	1
No. 2 Iowa Pre-Flight		–		7	–	3	–	1
No. 15 Fort Riley		–		6	–	3	–	0
No. 14 Fort Monmouth		–		5	–	2	–	2
No. 5 Saint Mary's Pre-Flight		–		6	–	3	–	1
No. T–20 Fort Douglas		–		5	–	3	–	0
No. 10 Corpus Christi NAS		–		4	–	3	–	1
No. 16 Camp Davis		–		4	–	3	–	2
Albuquerque AAB		–		5	–	4	–	0
No. 13 Lakehurst NAS		–		4	–	4	–	1
Santa Ana AAB		–		4	–	4	–	0
Will Rogers AB		–		4	–	4	–	0
No. 7 Camp Grant		–		4	–	5	–	0
No. 8 Pensacola NAS		–		3	–	5	–	1
No. T–18 Fort Totten		–		3	–	5	–	1
Camp Pickett		–		1	–	6	–	0
No. 12 Fort Knox		–		2	–	6	–	0
Alameda Coast Guard		–		1	–	7	–	1
No. T–18 Spence Field		–		0	–	4	–	0
No. T–20 Daniel Field		–		0	–	6	–	0
Rankings from AP Service Poll

The 1942 Fort Monmouth Signalmen football team represented Fort Monmouth during the 1942 college football season. The Signalmen compiled a 5–2–2 record, outscored their opponents by a total of 132 to 62, and shut out four opponents, on their way to capturing the mythical Second Army Corps area service crown with wins over Fort Totten and Camp Upton, along with a tie against Manhattan Beach. They would be ranked No. 14 in the Associated Press post-season poll for service academies.

== Schedule ==
Date	Time	Opponent	Site	Result	Attendance	Source
September 20		Philadelphia Defense	Frawley Field; Camp Wood, NJ	Cancelled	4,000	
September 26		at Columbia	Baker Field; New York, NY	L 0–39	6,000	
October 4	2:30 p.m.	Scranton	Frawley Field; Camp Wood, NJ	W 13–0		
October 10		at Lafayette	Fisher Field; Easton, PA	L 3–7		
October 18	2:30 p.m.	Manhattan Beach Coast Guard	Frawley Field; Camp Wood, NJ	T 14–14	5,000	
October 24		at Army plebes (freshmen)	Michie Stadium; West Point, NY	W 13–2	1,000	
November 1	2:30 p.m.	Camp Upton	Frawley Field; Camp Wood, NJ	W 32–0	7,000?	
November 8	2:30 p.m.	Lancaster Presidents	Frawley Field; Camp Wood, NJ	W 46–0		
November 14		at Rutgers	Rutgers Stadium; New Brunswick, NJ	T 0–0	3,000	
November 22		Camp Kilmer	Frawley Field; Camp Wood, NJ	Cancelled		
November 29		Fort Totten	Frawley Field; Camp Wood, NJ (Second corps area championship)	W 6–0		
