= 1942 Fort Knox Armoraiders football team =

American college football season

1942 Fort Knox Armoraiders football
- Conference: Independent

Ranking
- AP: No. 12 (APS)
- Record: 2–6
- Head coach: Joe Bach (1st season)
- Captain: Lopp (tackle)

1942 military service football records
| | Conf. | | | Overall |
| Team | W | L | T | W | | L | | T |
|---|---|---|---|---|---|---|---|---|
| No. 11 Second Air Force | | – | | 11 | – | 0 | – | 1 |
| No. 9 Manhattan Beach Coast Guard | | – | | 6 | – | 0 | – | 1 |
| No. 17 March Field | | – | | 11 | – | 2 | – | 0 |
| No. 3 Georgia Pre-Flight | | – | | 7 | – | 1 | – | 1 |
| No. 4 North Carolina Pre-Flight | | – | | 8 | – | 2 | – | 1 |
| No. 6 Jacksonville NAS | | – | | 9 | – | 3 | – | 0 |
| No. 1 Great Lakes Navy | | – | | 8 | – | 3 | – | 1 |
| No. 2 Iowa Pre-Flight | | – | | 7 | – | 3 | – | 1 |
| No. 15 Fort Riley | | – | | 6 | – | 3 | – | 0 |
| No. 14 Fort Monmouth | | – | | 5 | – | 2 | – | 2 |
| No. 5 Saint Mary's Pre-Flight | | – | | 6 | – | 3 | – | 1 |
| No. T–20 Fort Douglas | | – | | 5 | – | 3 | – | 0 |
| No. 10 Corpus Christi NAS | | – | | 4 | – | 3 | – | 1 |
| No. 16 Camp Davis | | – | | 4 | – | 3 | – | 2 |
| Albuquerque AAB | | – | | 5 | – | 4 | – | 0 |
| No. 13 Lakehurst NAS | | – | | 4 | – | 4 | – | 1 |
| Santa Ana AAB | | – | | 4 | – | 4 | – | 0 |
| Will Rogers AB | | – | | 4 | – | 4 | – | 0 |
| No. 7 Camp Grant | | – | | 4 | – | 5 | – | 0 |
| No. 8 Pensacola NAS | | – | | 3 | – | 5 | – | 1 |
| No. T–18 Fort Totten | | – | | 3 | – | 5 | – | 1 |
| Camp Pickett | | – | | 1 | – | 6 | – | 0 |
| No. 12 Fort Knox | | – | | 2 | – | 6 | – | 0 |
| Alameda Coast Guard | | – | | 1 | – | 7 | – | 1 |
| No. T–18 Spence Field | | – | | 0 | – | 4 | – | 0 |
| No. T–20 Daniel Field | | – | | 0 | – | 6 | – | 0 |
Rankings from AP Service Poll

The 1942 Fort Knox Armoraiders football team represented Fort Knox during the 1942 college football season. The Armoraiders compiled a 2–6 record against a diverse schedule of major and small colleges, and military service squads. They also played a in a mid-season exhibition game against the Pittsburgh Steelers of the National Football League (NFL). The team was led by head coach Joe Bach, who had previously coached at Niagara University. On November 15, the Armoraiders faced off against Steelers in a charity game for the USO, marking a rare occasion of a professional football team playing against a non-professional one.

== Schedule ==
| Date | Time | Opponent | Site | Result | Attendance | Source |
|---|---|---|---|---|---|---|
| September 26 | | at No. 1 Ohio State | Ohio Stadium; Columbus, OH | L 0–59 | 22,555 | |
| October 3 | | at Xavier | Cincinnati, OH | L 2–12 | | |
| October 11 | 2:00 p.m. | at Detroit | University of Detroit Stadium; Detroit, MI | L 0–16 | 18,351 | |
| October 17 | | at Marshall | Huntington, WV | W 20–6 | 3,000 | |
| October 31 | | vs. Camp Grant | Dyche Stadium; Evanston, IL | L 0–20 | | |
| November 7 | | vs. Iowa Pre-Flight | DuPont Manuel Stadium; Louisville, KY | L 7–13 | 2,000 | |
| November 15 | | at Pittsburgh Steelers | Pitt Stadium; Pittsburgh, PA (exhibition) | L 0–28 | 23,491 | |
| November 21 | | Youngstown | Fort Knox, KY | W 7–0 | | |
| November 28 | | vs. Indiana | Louisville, KY | L 0–51 | | |
Rankings from AP Poll released prior to the game
