= 1942 Great Lakes Navy Bluejackets football team =

American college football season

1942 Great Lakes Navy Bluejackets football
- Conference: Independent

Ranking
- AP: No. 1 (APS)
- Record: 8–3–1
- Head coach: Tony Hinkle (1st season)
- Home stadium: Soldier Field

1942 military service football records
	Conf.			Overall
Team	W	L	T	W		L		T
No. 11 Second Air Force		–		11	–	0	–	1
No. 9 Manhattan Beach Coast Guard		–		6	–	0	–	1
No. 17 March Field		–		11	–	2	–	0
No. 3 Georgia Pre-Flight		–		7	–	1	–	1
No. 4 North Carolina Pre-Flight		–		8	–	2	–	1
No. 6 Jacksonville NAS		–		9	–	3	–	0
No. 1 Great Lakes Navy		–		8	–	3	–	1
No. 2 Iowa Pre-Flight		–		7	–	3	–	1
No. 15 Fort Riley		–		6	–	3	–	0
No. 14 Fort Monmouth		–		5	–	2	–	2
No. 5 Saint Mary's Pre-Flight		–		6	–	3	–	1
No. T–20 Fort Douglas		–		5	–	3	–	0
No. 10 Corpus Christi NAS		–		4	–	3	–	1
No. 16 Camp Davis		–		4	–	3	–	2
Albuquerque AAB		–		5	–	4	–	0
No. 13 Lakehurst NAS		–		4	–	4	–	1
Santa Ana AAB		–		4	–	4	–	0
Will Rogers AB		–		4	–	4	–	0
No. 7 Camp Grant		–		4	–	5	–	0
No. 8 Pensacola NAS		–		3	–	5	–	1
No. T–18 Fort Totten		–		3	–	5	–	1
Camp Pickett		–		1	–	6	–	0
No. 12 Fort Knox		–		2	–	6	–	0
Alameda Coast Guard		–		1	–	7	–	1
No. T–18 Spence Field		–		0	–	4	–	0
No. T–20 Daniel Field		–		0	–	6	–	0
Rankings from AP Service Poll

The 1942 Great Lakes Navy Bluejackets football team represented the United States Navy's Great Lakes Naval Training Station (Great Lakes NTS) during the 1942 college football season. Playing a schedule that included six Big Nine Conference football teams, Notre Dame, Pitt, Michigan State, and Missouri, the team compiled an 8–3–1 record, shut out seven opponents, and outscored all opponents by a total of 222 to 55. The team was ranked No. 1 among the service teams in a poll of 91 sports writers conducted by the Associated Press.

The team's head coach was Tony Hinkle, who coached football, baseball, and basketball at Butler University before the war. Butler agreed in March 1942 to send Hinkle to Great Lakes NTS to assist in the war effort.

The team was made up of college and professional football players who were serving in the Navy and stationed at Great Lakes NTS. The team was led on offense by Bruce Smith, who won the Heisman Trophy in 1941 while playing for Minnesota. Other players included: Rudy Mucha, a consensus All-American center in 1940 who spent the 1941 season in the NFL, Bob Sweiger (fullback, Minnesota), Pete Kmetovic (halfback, Stanford), Vic Marino (All-Big Ten guard from Ohio State) Bill Radovich (guard, USC/Detroit Lions), Carl Mulleneaux (end, Utah State), and Steve Belichick, father of Bill Belichick who played for the Detroit Lions in 1941.

== Schedule ==
Date	Opponent	Site	Result	Attendance	Source
September 26	at Michigan	Michigan Stadium; Ann Arbor, MI	L 0–9	17,031	
October 3	at Iowa	Iowa Stadium; Iowa City, IA	W 25–0	8,600	
October 10	vs. Pittsburgh	Cleveland Municipal Stadium; Cleveland, OH	W 7–6	12,315	
October 17	No. 7 Wisconsin	Soldier Field; Chicago, IL	L 7–13	30,000	
October 24	at Michigan State	Macklin Field; East Lansing, MI	L 0–14	12,000	
October 31	vs. Missouri	Sportsman's Park; St. Louis, MO	W 17–0	16,627	
November 7	at Purdue	Ross–Ade Stadium; West Lafayette, IN	W 42–0	12,000	
November 11	at Camp Grant	Bell Bowl; Camp Grant, IL	W 33–0	8,000	
November 15	at Marquette	Marquette Stadium; Milwaukee, WI	W 24–0	20,000	
November 21	at Illinois	Memorial Stadium; Champaign, IL	W 6–0	10,856	
November 26	at Northwestern	Dyche Stadium; Evanston, IL	W 48–0	18,500	
December 5	No. 8 Notre Dame	Soldier Field; Chicago, IL	T 13–13	35,000	
Rankings from AP Poll released prior to the game
