= 1942 Lakehurst Naval Air Station Blimps football team =

American college football season

1942 Lakehurst Naval Air Station Blimps football
- Conference: Independent

Ranking
- AP: No. 13 (APS)
- Record: 4–4–1
- Head coach: Mal Elward (1st season)

1942 military service football records
	Conf.			Overall
Team	W	L	T	W		L		T
No. 11 Second Air Force		–		11	–	0	–	1
No. 9 Manhattan Beach Coast Guard		–		6	–	0	–	1
No. 17 March Field		–		11	–	2	–	0
No. 3 Georgia Pre-Flight		–		7	–	1	–	1
No. 4 North Carolina Pre-Flight		–		8	–	2	–	1
No. 6 Jacksonville NAS		–		9	–	3	–	0
No. 1 Great Lakes Navy		–		8	–	3	–	1
No. 2 Iowa Pre-Flight		–		7	–	3	–	1
No. 15 Fort Riley		–		6	–	3	–	0
No. 14 Fort Monmouth		–		5	–	2	–	2
No. 5 Saint Mary's Pre-Flight		–		6	–	3	–	1
No. T–20 Fort Douglas		–		5	–	3	–	0
No. 10 Corpus Christi NAS		–		4	–	3	–	1
No. 16 Camp Davis		–		4	–	3	–	2
Albuquerque AAB		–		5	–	4	–	0
No. 13 Lakehurst NAS		–		4	–	4	–	1
Santa Ana AAB		–		4	–	4	–	0
Will Rogers AB		–		4	–	4	–	0
No. 7 Camp Grant		–		4	–	5	–	0
No. 8 Pensacola NAS		–		3	–	5	–	1
No. T–18 Fort Totten		–		3	–	5	–	1
Camp Pickett		–		1	–	6	–	0
No. 12 Fort Knox		–		2	–	6	–	0
Alameda Coast Guard		–		1	–	7	–	1
No. T–18 Spence Field		–		0	–	4	–	0
No. T–20 Daniel Field		–		0	–	6	–	0
Rankings from AP Service Poll

The 1942 Lakehurst Naval Air Station Blimps football team represented the United States Navy's Lakehurst Naval Air Station (Lakehurst NAS) during the 1942 college football season. The team compiled a 4–4–1 record. The team's head coach was Mal Elward, who served as the head football coach at Purdue prior to the war. Elward's assistant coaches were Art Kahler, Alex Yunevich, Joe Conroy, and Gates Kimball.

The team was made up of college and professional football players who were serving in the Navy and stationed at Lakehurst NAS. Key players included: halfback Jack Banta who played for the Washington Redskins in 1941; fullback Paul Spencer of Alabama; Johnny Doolan of Georgetown; end Paul Boroff of NYU; Brud Harper of Princeton; and Francis Vedery of Williams College.

== Schedule ==
Date	Opponent	Site	Result	Attendance	Source
September 26	at Princeton	Palmer Stadium; Princeton, NJ	L 6–20	6,000	
October 3	at Maryland	Byrd Stadium; College Park, MD	L 0–14		
October 9	at Delaware	Wilmington Park; Wilmington, DE	L 7–20	7,000	
October 17	at Albright	Albright Stadium; Reading, PA	W 14–0		
October 24	at Pennsylvania Military	Chester, PA	W 20–7		
November 1	at Scranton	Scranton-Dunmore Stadium; Scranton, PA	T 14–14	4,000	
November 14	at Lafayette	Fisher Field; Easton, PA	W 14–0		
November 21	at Muhlenberg	Allentown, PA	W 27–7		
November 25	at Duquesne	Forbes Field; Pittsburgh, PA	L 0–13	8,083	
