= 1942 Appalachian State Mountaineers football team =

American college football season

1942 Appalachian State Mountaineers football
- Conference: North State Conference
- Record: 5–2–1 (2–2 NSC)
- Head coach: Beattie Feathers (1st season)
- Home stadium: College Field

1942 North State Conference football standings
	Conf.					Overall
Team	W		L		T	W		L		T
Catawba $	4	–	0	–	0	9	–	2	–	0
Appalachian State	2	–	2	–	0	5	–	2	–	1
High Point	1	–	4	–	0	1	–	6	–	1
Guilford	0	–	1	–	0	0	–	6	–	0
$ – Conference champion

The 1942 Appalachian State Mountaineers football team was an American football team that represented Appalachian State Teachers College (now known as Appalachian State University) as a member of the North State Conference during the 1942 college football season. In their only year under head coach Beattie Feathers, the Mountaineers compiled an overall record of 5–2–1, with a mark of 2–2 in conference play, and finished 2nd in the NSC.

Appalachian State was ranked at No. 168 (out of 590 college and military teams) in the final rankings under the Litkenhous Difference by Score System for 1942.

== Schedule ==
Date	Opponent	Site	Result	Source
September 18	at Apprentice*	Apprentice Field; Newport News, VA	W 16–13	
October 3	at Camp Davis*	Legion Stadium; Wilmington, NC	T 13–13	
October 10	High Point	College Field; Boone, NC	W 27–0	
October 17	Catawba	College Field; Boone, NC	L 0–7	
October 31	at High Point	Albion Millis Stadium; High Point, NC	W 44–0	
November 6	Newberry*	College Field; Boone, NC	W 20–0	
November 14	at Maryville (TN)*	Maryville, TN	W 20–7	
November 26	at Catawba	Shuford Stadium; Salisbury, NC	L 0–26	
*Non-conference game
