= Don Williams (guard) =

American football player (1919–2001)

No. 38
- Position: Guard

Personal information
- Born: May 23, 1919; Claude, Texas, U.S.
- Died: August 11, 2001 (aged 82); Waco, Texas, U.S.
- Listed height: 5 ft 8 in (1.73 m)
- Listed weight: 210 lb (95 kg)

Career information
- High school: Amarillo (Amarillo, Texas)
- College: Texas
- NFL draft: 1941: 10th round, 81st overall pick

Career history
- Pittsburgh Steelers (1941)

Career NFL statistics
- Games played: 6
- Stats at Pro Football Reference

Don Donaho Williams (May 23, 1919 – August 11, 2001) was an American professional football guard who played for one season in the National Football League (NFL). After playing college football for Texas, he was drafted by the Philadelphia Eagles in the 10th round of the 1941 NFL draft. His rights were transferred to the Pittsburgh Steelers due to the events later referred to as the Pennsylvania Polka, and he played for them in 1941. In 1942, he played for the Second Air Force.

After his time in the NFL, Williams served in the Air Force for 26 years as a civil engineer achieving the rank of lieutenant colonel. He served in the Pacific during World War II and in Korea during the Korean War. He was awarded numerous medals for distinguished service, and retired in 1967.
