= 1942 Georgia Pre-Flight Skycrackers football team =

American college football season

1942 Georgia Pre-Flight Skycrackers football
- Conference: Independent

Ranking
- AP: No. 3 (APS)
- Record: 7–1–1
- Head coach: Raymond Wolf (1st season)
- Home stadium: Sanford Stadium

1942 military service football records
	Conf.			Overall
Team	W	L	T	W		L		T
No. 11 Second Air Force		–		11	–	0	–	1
No. 9 Manhattan Beach Coast Guard		–		6	–	0	–	1
No. 17 March Field		–		11	–	2	–	0
No. 3 Georgia Pre-Flight		–		7	–	1	–	1
No. 4 North Carolina Pre-Flight		–		8	–	2	–	1
No. 6 Jacksonville NAS		–		9	–	3	–	0
No. 1 Great Lakes Navy		–		8	–	3	–	1
No. 2 Iowa Pre-Flight		–		7	–	3	–	1
No. 15 Fort Riley		–		6	–	3	–	0
No. 14 Fort Monmouth		–		5	–	2	–	2
No. 5 Saint Mary's Pre-Flight		–		6	–	3	–	1
No. T–20 Fort Douglas		–		5	–	3	–	0
No. 10 Corpus Christi NAS		–		4	–	3	–	1
No. 16 Camp Davis		–		4	–	3	–	2
Albuquerque AAB		–		5	–	4	–	0
No. 13 Lakehurst NAS		–		4	–	4	–	1
Santa Ana AAB		–		4	–	4	–	0
Will Rogers AB		–		4	–	4	–	0
No. 7 Camp Grant		–		4	–	5	–	0
No. 8 Pensacola NAS		–		3	–	5	–	1
No. T–18 Fort Totten		–		3	–	5	–	1
Camp Pickett		–		1	–	6	–	0
No. 12 Fort Knox		–		2	–	6	–	0
Alameda Coast Guard		–		1	–	7	–	1
No. T–18 Spence Field		–		0	–	4	–	0
No. T–20 Daniel Field		–		0	–	6	–	0
Rankings from AP Service Poll

The 1942 Georgia Pre-Flight Skycrackers football team represented the United States Navy pre-flight aviation training school at the University of Georgia during the 1942 college football season. The team compiled a 7–1–1 record and outscored opponents by a total of 183 to 105. The team was ranked No. 3 among the service teams in a poll of 91 sports writers conducted by the Associated Press.

Raymond "Bear" Wolf was the team's head coach. The roster of the 1942 Georgia Pre-Flight team was made up of stars from colleges and NFL teams around the country. Notable players (with their prior team in parentheses) included: Frank Filchock (Washington Redskins), Bob Suffridge (Philadelphia Eagles), Ernie Blandin (Tulane), Jim Poole (New York Giants), Spec Sanders,(New York Yanks), Charlie Timmons (Georgia/Clemson), Allie White (Philadelphia Eagles), Darrell Tully (Detroit Lions), Herschel Ramsey (Philadelphia Eagles), Bob Foxx (Tennessee, 1939 SEC Co-Player of the Year), Noble Doss (Texas), Billy Patterson (Pittsburgh Steelers), Al Piasecky (Duke), Ed Hickerson (Alabama), and Bill Kirchem (Tulane).

Two Skycrackers were named to the 1942 All-Navy All-America football team: Jim Poole at left end and Bill Davis at right tackle. In addition, Gordon English (left end) and Francis Crimmins (left guard) were named to the 1942 All-Navy Preflight Cadet All-America team.

== Schedule ==
Date	Opponent	Site	Result	Attendance	Source
September 26	at Penn	Franklin Field; Philadelphia PA	W 14–6	30,000	
October 2	North Carolina Pre-Flight	Sanford Stadium; Athens, GA	T 14–14	7,500	
October 10	at Duke	Duke Stadium; Durham, NC	W 26–12	7,500	
October 17	at Pensacola NAS	Pensacola, FL	W 26–0	4,000	
October 24	at LSU	Tiger Stadium; Baton Rouge, LA	L 0–34	15,000	
October 30	Jacksonville NAS	Sanford Stadium; Athens, GA	W 20–6	7,000	
November 7	vs. Auburn	Memorial Stadium; Columbus, GA	W 41–14	6,500	
November 14	at Tulane	Tulane Stadium; New Orleans, LA	W 7–0	18,000	
November 28	at No. 7 Alabama	Legion Field; Birmingham, AL	W 35–19	7,000	
Rankings from AP Poll released prior to the game
