= 1942 Iowa Pre-Flight Seahawks football team =

American college football season

1942 Iowa Pre-Flight Seahawks football
- Conference: Independent

Ranking
- AP: No. 2 (APS)
- Record: 7–3
- Head coach: Bernie Bierman (1st season)
- Home stadium: Iowa Stadium

1942 military service football records
	Conf.			Overall
Team	W	L	T	W		L		T
No. 11 Second Air Force		–		11	–	0	–	1
No. 9 Manhattan Beach Coast Guard		–		6	–	0	–	1
No. 17 March Field		–		11	–	2	–	0
No. 3 Georgia Pre-Flight		–		7	–	1	–	1
No. 4 North Carolina Pre-Flight		–		8	–	2	–	1
No. 6 Jacksonville NAS		–		9	–	3	–	0
No. 1 Great Lakes Navy		–		8	–	3	–	1
No. 2 Iowa Pre-Flight		–		7	–	3	–	1
No. 15 Fort Riley		–		6	–	3	–	0
No. 14 Fort Monmouth		–		5	–	2	–	2
No. 5 Saint Mary's Pre-Flight		–		6	–	3	–	1
No. T–20 Fort Douglas		–		5	–	3	–	0
No. 10 Corpus Christi NAS		–		4	–	3	–	1
No. 16 Camp Davis		–		4	–	3	–	2
Albuquerque AAB		–		5	–	4	–	0
No. 13 Lakehurst NAS		–		4	–	4	–	1
Santa Ana AAB		–		4	–	4	–	0
Will Rogers AB		–		4	–	4	–	0
No. 7 Camp Grant		–		4	–	5	–	0
No. 8 Pensacola NAS		–		3	–	5	–	1
No. T–18 Fort Totten		–		3	–	5	–	1
Camp Pickett		–		1	–	6	–	0
No. 12 Fort Knox		–		2	–	6	–	0
Alameda Coast Guard		–		1	–	7	–	1
No. T–18 Spence Field		–		0	–	4	–	0
No. T–20 Daniel Field		–		0	–	6	–	0
Rankings from AP Service Poll

The 1942 Iowa Pre-Flight Seahawks football team represented the United States Navy pre-flight aviation training school at the University of Iowa as an independent during the 1942 college football season. The team compiled a 7–3 record and outscored opponents by a total of 211 to 121. The 1942 team was known for its difficult schedule, including Notre Dame, Michigan, Ohio State, Minnesota, Indiana, Nebraska, and Missouri. The team was ranked No. 2 among the service teams in a poll of 91 sports writers conducted by the Associated Press.

The Navy's pre-flight aviation training school opened on April 15, 1942, with a 27-minute ceremony during which Iowa Governor George A. Wilson turned over certain facilities at the University of Iowa to be used for the training of naval aviators. At the time, Wilson said, "We are glad it is possible to place the facilities of this university and all the force and power of the state of Iowa in a service that is today most vital to safeguarding our liberties." The first group of 600 air cadets was scheduled to arrive on May 28.

Bernie Bierman, then holding the rank of major, was placed in charge of the physical conditioning program at the school. Bierman had been the head coach of Minnesota from 1932 to 1941 and served as the head coach of the Iowa Pre-Flight team in 1942. Larry Snyder, previously the track coach at Ohio State, was assigned as Bierman's assistant. Don Heap, Dallas Ward, Babe LeVoir, and Trevor Reese were assigned as assistant coaches for the football team.

In June 1942, Bierman addressed the "misconception" that the Iowa pre-flight school was "merely a place for varsity athletics." He said: "Our purpose here is to turn out the toughest bunch of flyers the world has ever seen and not first class athletes."

Two Seahawks were named to the 1942 All-Navy All-America football team: George Svendsen at center and Dick Fisher at left halfback. In addition, Bill Kolens (right tackle), Judd Ringer (right end), George Benson (quarterback), and Bill Schatzer (left halfback) were named to the 1942 All-Navy Preflight Cadet All-America team.

== Schedule ==
Date	Opponent	Site	Result	Attendance	Source
September 19	at Kansas	Memorial Stadium; Lawrence, KS	W 61–0	3,000	
September 26	at Northwestern	Dyche Stadium; Evanston, IL	W 20–12	20,000	
October 3	at Minnesota	Memorial Stadium; Minneapolis, MN	W 7–6	37,500	
October 10	at Michigan	Michigan Stadium; Ann Arbor, MI	W 26–14	34,126	
October 17	at Notre Dame	Notre Dame Stadium; Notre Dame, IN	L 0–28	30,000	
October 31	at Indiana	Memorial Stadium; Bloomington, IN	W 26–6	8,000	
November 7	at Fort Knox	DuPont Manual Stadium; Louisville, KY	W 13–7	2,000	
November 21	Nebraska	Iowa Stadium; Iowa City, IA	W 46–0	5,400	
November 28	at No. 3 Ohio State	Ohio Stadium; Columbus, OH	L 12–41	27,259	
December 5	at Missouri	Ruppert Stadium; Kansas City, MO	L 0–7	7,600	
Rankings from AP Poll released prior to the game

== Roster ==
Player	Position
George Benson	Back
Matt Bolger	End
Al Couppee	Back
Forest Evashevski	Back
Dick Fisher	Back
Bob Flora	Tackle
Fred Gage	
Bill Kolens	Tackle
Malcolm Kutner	End
Jim Langhurst	Back
Bus Mertes	Back
George Paskvan	Back
Billy Schatzer	Back
George Svenson	Kicker
Bobby Swisher	Back
