= Joe Margucci =

American football player (1921–1996)

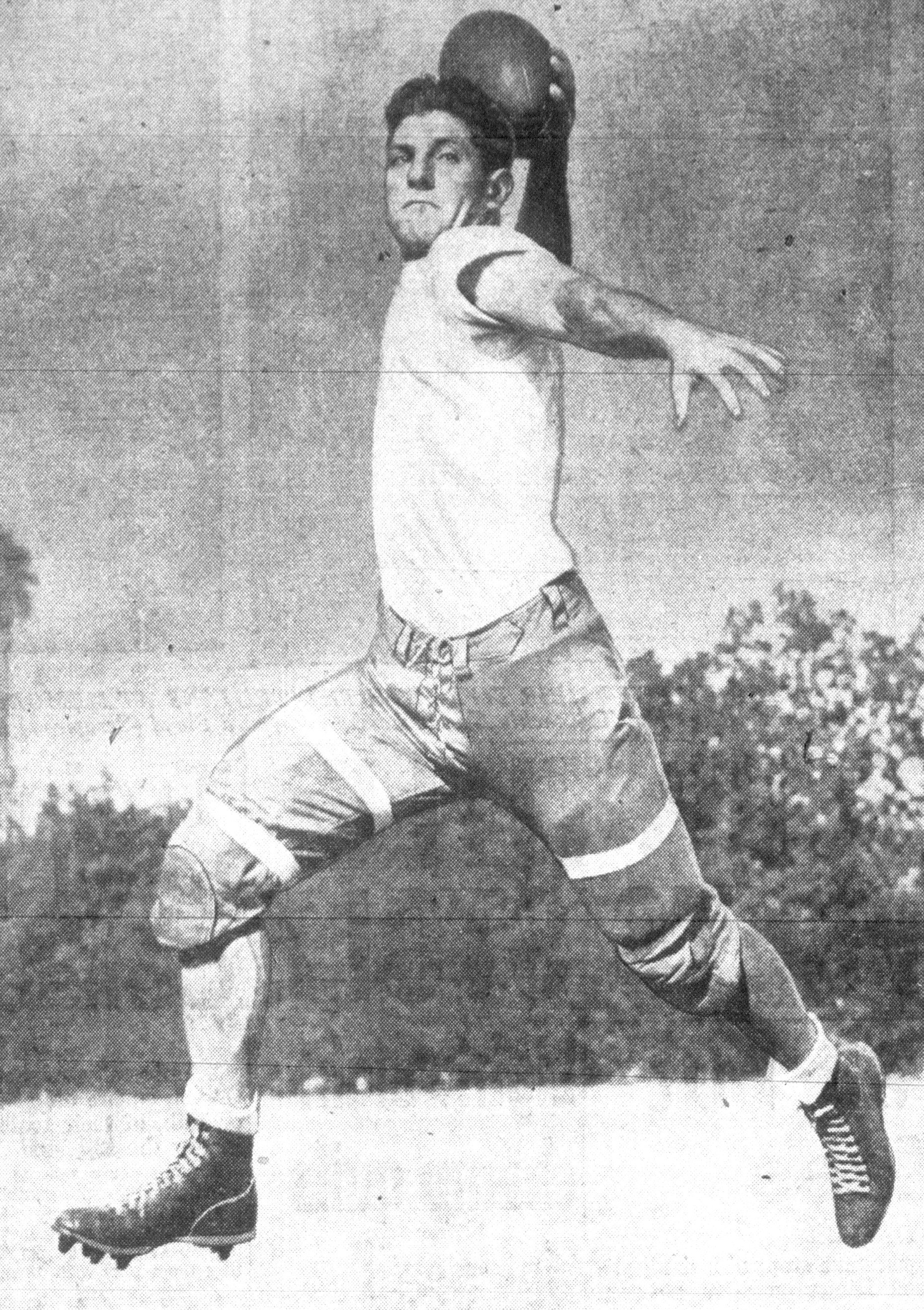
- Margucci, circa 1942

No. 81, 15
- Positions: Quarterback, halfback

Personal information
- Born: September 5, 1921; Brooklyn, New York, U.S.
- Died: April 27, 1996 (aged 74); Encino, California, U.S.
- Listed height: 5 ft 10 in (1.78 m)
- Listed weight: 182 lb (83 kg)

Career information
- High school: Franklin (Los Angeles, California)
- College: USC
- NFL draft: 1941: undrafted

Career history
- Detroit Lions (1947–1948)

Career NFL statistics
- TD: 7
- Receiving yards: 575
- Stats at Pro Football Reference

Joseph Americus Margucci (September 5, 1921 – April 27, 1996) was an American professional football player who was a quarterback and halfback for the Detroit Lions of the National Football League (NFL).

Margucci was born in 1921 in New York City. He attended Franklin High School in Los Angeles. He played college football for Santa Ana Junior College in 1940 and 1941. He had planned to transfer to USC, but with the United States' entry into World War II, Margucci entered the United States Army Air Forces. He played for the 1942 Santa Ana Army Air Base Flyers football team.

After the war, Margucci played professional football for the Los Angeles Bulldogs of the Pacific Coast Football League in 1946 and for the NFL's Detroit Lions during the 1947 and 1948 seasons. He appeared in 23 games for the Lions, nine of them as a starter, rushed for 111 yards on 60 carries, and scored seven touchdowns. He also caught 46 passes for 575 yards and three touchdowns and completed 13 of 31 passes for 171 yards and a touchdown. He was waived by the Lions in September 1949.

After retiring as a player, Margucci worked as a coach. He began with four years as a football and basketball coach at Marshall High School in Los Angeles. In February 1953, he was hired as the backfield coach for the Denver Pioneers football program.

Margucci died in 1996 in Encino, California.
