= 1942 Manhattan Beach Coast Guard Depth Bombers football team =

College football season

1942 Manhattan Beach Coast Guard Depth Bombers football
- Conference: Independent

Ranking
- AP: No. 9 (APS)
- Record: 6–0–1
- Head coach: Gar Griffith (1st season)

1942 military service football records
	Conf.			Overall
Team	W	L	T	W		L		T
No. 11 Second Air Force		–		11	–	0	–	1
No. 9 Manhattan Beach Coast Guard		–		6	–	0	–	1
No. 17 March Field		–		11	–	2	–	0
No. 3 Georgia Pre-Flight		–		7	–	1	–	1
No. 4 North Carolina Pre-Flight		–		8	–	2	–	1
No. 6 Jacksonville NAS		–		9	–	3	–	0
No. 1 Great Lakes Navy		–		8	–	3	–	1
No. 2 Iowa Pre-Flight		–		7	–	3	–	1
No. 15 Fort Riley		–		6	–	3	–	0
No. 14 Fort Monmouth		–		5	–	2	–	2
No. 5 Saint Mary's Pre-Flight		–		6	–	3	–	1
No. T–20 Fort Douglas		–		5	–	3	–	0
No. 10 Corpus Christi NAS		–		4	–	3	–	1
No. 16 Camp Davis		–		4	–	3	–	2
Albuquerque AAB		–		5	–	4	–	0
No. 13 Lakehurst NAS		–		4	–	4	–	1
Santa Ana AAB		–		4	–	4	–	0
Will Rogers AB		–		4	–	4	–	0
No. 7 Camp Grant		–		4	–	5	–	0
No. 8 Pensacola NAS		–		3	–	5	–	1
No. T–18 Fort Totten		–		3	–	5	–	1
Camp Pickett		–		1	–	6	–	0
No. 12 Fort Knox		–		2	–	6	–	0
Alameda Coast Guard		–		1	–	7	–	1
No. T–18 Spence Field		–		0	–	4	–	0
No. T–20 Daniel Field		–		0	–	6	–	0
Rankings from AP Service Poll

The 1942 Manhattan Beach Coast Guard football team represented the United States Coast Guard's training school at Manhattan Beach, Brooklyn, during the 1942 college football season. The team compiled a 6–0–1 record and was ranked No. 9 among the service teams in a poll of 91 sports writers conducted by the Associated Press.

The team was coached by Gar Griffith, who both played and coached football at Ohio State before the war, and Pug Vaughan, who was a player-coach. Notable players included Esco Sarkkinen, Mike Karmazin, and Eulace Peacock. Lt. Commander Jack Dempsey, the former heavyweight champion of the world, was the director of physical education; he was referred to in press coverage as the team's "water boy."

== Schedule ==
Date	Time	Opponent	Site	Result	Attendance	Source
September 26	2:30 p.m.	at Brooklyn	Brooklyn, NY	W 30–0		
October 3	2:30 p.m.	at CCNY	Lewisohn Stadium; New York, NY	W 31–0		
October 10		at Villanova	Shibe Park; Philadelphia, PA	W 20–13	18,000	
October 18		at Fort Monmouth	Frawley Field; Fort Monmouth, NJ	T 7–7		
October 22		Boston College		Scrimmage		
October 31		at Toledo	Swayne Field; Toledo, OH	W 20–0		
November 14		at Springfield	Pratt Field; Springfield, MA	W 14–13		
November 22		at Scranton	Scranton, PA	W 27–0		
All times are in Eastern time
