= 1942 Second Air Force Bombers football team =

American college football season

1942 Second Air Force Bombers football

Sun Bowl, W 13–8 vs. Hardin–Simmons
- Conference: Independent

Ranking
- AP: No. 11 (APS)
- Record: 11–0–1
- Head coach: Red Reese (1st season)

1942 military service football records
	Conf.			Overall
Team	W	L	T	W		L		T
No. 11 Second Air Force		–		11	–	0	–	1
No. 9 Manhattan Beach Coast Guard		–		6	–	0	–	1
No. 17 March Field		–		11	–	2	–	0
No. 3 Georgia Pre-Flight		–		7	–	1	–	1
No. 4 North Carolina Pre-Flight		–		8	–	2	–	1
No. 6 Jacksonville NAS		–		9	–	3	–	0
No. 1 Great Lakes Navy		–		8	–	3	–	1
No. 2 Iowa Pre-Flight		–		7	–	3	–	1
No. 15 Fort Riley		–		6	–	3	–	0
No. 14 Fort Monmouth		–		5	–	2	–	2
No. 5 Saint Mary's Pre-Flight		–		6	–	3	–	1
No. T–20 Fort Douglas		–		5	–	3	–	0
No. 10 Corpus Christi NAS		–		4	–	3	–	1
No. 16 Camp Davis		–		4	–	3	–	2
Albuquerque AAB		–		5	–	4	–	0
No. 13 Lakehurst NAS		–		4	–	4	–	1
Santa Ana AAB		–		4	–	4	–	0
Will Rogers AB		–		4	–	4	–	0
No. 7 Camp Grant		–		4	–	5	–	0
No. 8 Pensacola NAS		–		3	–	5	–	1
No. T–18 Fort Totten		–		3	–	5	–	1
Camp Pickett		–		1	–	6	–	0
No. 12 Fort Knox		–		2	–	6	–	0
Alameda Coast Guard		–		1	–	7	–	1
No. T–18 Spence Field		–		0	–	4	–	0
No. T–20 Daniel Field		–		0	–	6	–	0
Rankings from AP Service Poll

The 1942 Second Air Force Bombers football team represented the Second Air Force during the 1942 college football season. The team, based at Fort George Wright in Spokane, Washington, compiled an 11–0–1 record and defeated the Hardin–Simmons Cowboys in the 1943 Sun Bowl.

Despite its undefeated record, the Second Air Force team and all other service teams were omitted from the football rankings. Washington State, ranked No. 16 in the final AP poll, played the Second Air Force team to a 6–6 tie.

Red Reese, who coached football and basketball at Eastern Washington College before the war, was the team's head coach. The team was led by a backfield that included former Washington State quarterback Bill Sewell, fullback Vic Spadaccini from Minnesota, Hal Van Every, a triple-threat halfback who played for the Green Bay Packers before the war, and Johnny Holmes from Washington State. The linemen included ends Al Bodney and Bill Hornick, former Stanford center Tony Cavelli, Glen Conley of Washington and Don Williams of Texas at tackle, Tony Rosselli of Youngstown and Bill Holmes of Washington at guard.

== Schedule ==
Date	Opponent	Site	Result	Attendance	Source
September 21	vs. Saint Martin's	Walla Walla, WA	W 21–0	2,500	
September 26	vs. Eastern Washington	Ephrata, WA	W 19–7		
October 3	vs. Idaho	Gonzaga Stadium; Spokane, WA	W 14–0	7,000	
October 10	at Fort Douglas	Wendover, UT	W 37–0	1,200	
October 17	vs. Portland	Ute Stadium; Salt Lake City, UT	W 20–13	5,000	
October 24	vs. College of Idaho	Boise, ID	W 75–0		
November 1	at Kansas Wesleyan	Kansas Wesleyan Field; Salina, KS	W 47–0		
November 11	at Fort Riley	Topeka, KS	W 54–6		
November 21	vs. No. 12 Washington State	Gonzaga Stadium; Spokane, WA	T 6–6	10,000	
December 5	at Arizona	Arizona Stadium; Tucson, AZ	W 27–13	> 7,500	
December 20	vs. March Field	Gilmore Stadium; Los Angeles, CA	W 26–13	7,000	
January 1, 1943	vs. Hardin–Simmons	Kidd Field; El Paso, TX (Sun Bowl)	W 13–7	16,000	
Rankings from AP Poll released prior to the game
