= Dick Danehe =

American football player (1920–2018)

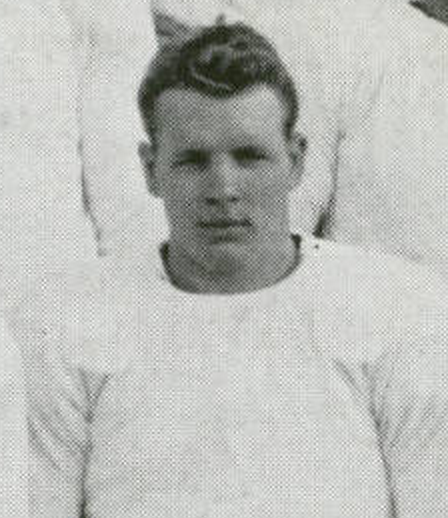
- Danehe pictured c. 1941 at USC

No. 27
- Position: Tackle

Personal information
- Born: September 10, 1920; Memphis, Tennessee, U.S.
- Died: June 20, 2018 (aged 97)
- Listed height: 6 ft 2 in (1.88 m)
- Listed weight: 235 lb (107 kg)

Career information
- High school: Hickman (Columbia, Missouri)
- College: USC

Career history
- Los Angeles Dons (1947)
- Stats at Pro Football Reference

Richard Michael Danehe (September 10, 1920 – June 20, 2018) was an American football defensive end and tackle who played two seasons with the Los Angeles Dons of the All-America Football Conference. He played college football at the University of Southern California, having previously attended Hickman High School in Columbia, Missouri. He later worked as a football announcer. Danehe died in June 2018 at the age of 97.
