= Camp Grant (Illinois) =

U. S. Army facility at Rockford, Illinois

Coordinates: 42°12′30″N 89°04′56″W

Camp Grant was a U.S. Army facility located in the southern outskirts of Rockford, Illinois, named in honor of American Civil War general Ulysses S. Grant. Camp Grant covered an area of 5,600 acres during World War I and 3,200 acres during World War II, and was in operation from 1917 to 1946.

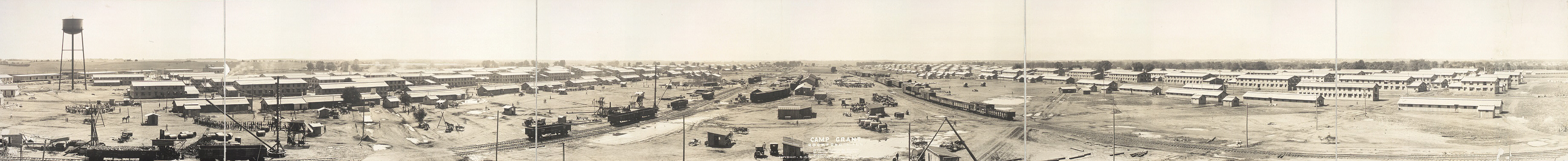
Panorama of Camp Grant

== World War I ==
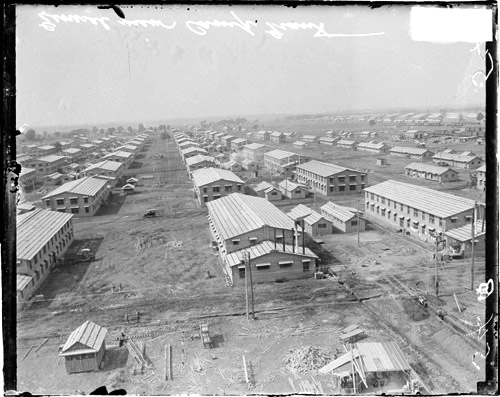
Aerial shot of Camp Grant

Established in 1917, Camp Grant saw its first "selected men," or draftees, arrive in September of that year. Primarily a location for training infantry, it became one of the largest military training facilities in the United States during World War I. The 86th Infantry Division ("Black Hawk" Division) was formed there. Men of the 86th, after their initial training, were sent to other units. While never serving as a division in combat during World War I, elements saw combat. The 172nd Infantry Brigade was organized at Camp Grant.

In 1918, the Spanish Influenza Pandemic affected over 4,000 men at the camp, taking the lives of over 1,000 between 23 September and 1 October. Camp Grant was closed as an active U.S. Army facility by December 1923, but in January 1924, it was turned over to the Illinois National Guard.

== Civilian Conservation Corps ==
The interwar period also saw Camp Grant used by the Civilian Conservation Corps between 1933 and 1935.

== World War II ==
In February 1941, Camp Grant was re-activated as an induction center and Army Medical Service individual training center, being transferred by Illinois back to the federal government. Providing physical and medical exams for new U.S. Army soldiers was the main focus, although a large number of personnel also went through Camp Grant for their Army basic training. It is estimated that 100,000 medical personnel were trained at the camp. During the war, Camp Grant also served as a prisoner of war detention center, employing upwards of 6,000 civilians, boosting Rockford's economy. It is estimated that 2,500 POWs were held in the camp. After the war, Camp Grant also served as a separation center for returning GIs.

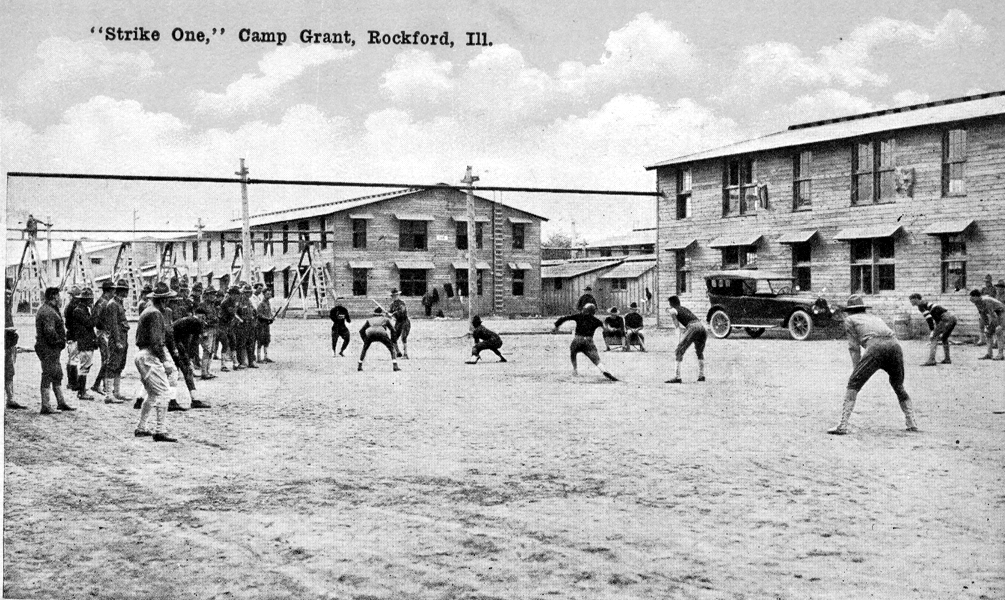
Camp Grant

== Post war ==
In 1946, Camp Grant was permanently closed. The Chicago Rockford International Airport occupies much of the land that used to be Camp Grant. For a few years after the war, the barracks buildings of Camp Grant were converted into makeshift apartments. These 'homes' were utilized by returning GIs that had young families. By the late 1940s, many of Camp Grant's buildings were torn down and residents moved out. In the 1950s, much of the remaining camp land was in the possession of Seth B. Atwood, who would later donate the former Camp Grant rifle range to the Rockford Park District, who would name it the Seth Atwood Park. Edit: There were still apartments in 1979.

== In fiction ==
Camp Grant serves as the setting for the book, Taps for Charlie by Carl Brown.

It was mentioned in M*A*S*H Season 5, episode 17 and episode 23 by Colonel Potter.

The camp was also mentioned in the series Boardwalk Empire'' by James "Jimmy" Darmody as his basic to a young Al Capone in the pilot episode.

In Roots: The Next Generations, it is revealed that Simon Haley, father of Alex Haley, was stationed there in World War I.

== See also ==
- List of World War II military service football teams
