= Marine Corps Outlying Field Camp Davis =

MCOLF Camp Davis Greater Sandy Run Training Area
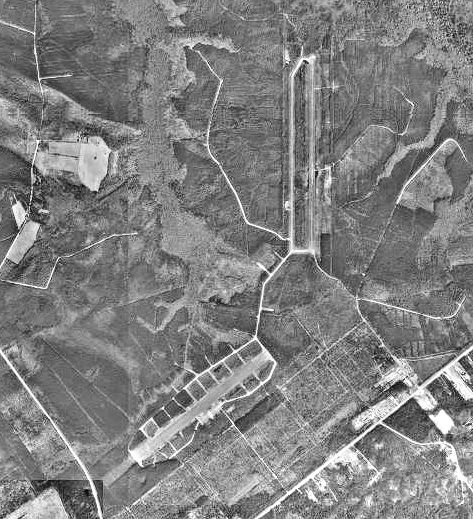
- USGS aerial image – 8 March 1993
- IATA: none; ICAO: none; FAA LID: 14NC

Summary
- Airport type: Military
- Owner: U.S. Navy
- Location: Onslow County, near Holly Ridge, North Carolina
- Built: 1940 by U.S. Army
- Elevation AMSL: 60 ft / 18 m
- Coordinates: 34°31′00″N 077°33′00″W
- Interactive map of MCOLF Camp Davis

Runways
Direction	Length		Surface
Direction	ft	m	Surface
5/23	5,000	1,524	Concrete
18/36	5,000	1,524	Concrete
- Source: Federal Aviation Administration

Marine Corps Outlying Field (MCOLF) Camp Davis (FAA LID: 14NC) is a military airport northeast of the central business district of Holly Ridge, in Onslow County, North Carolina, United States. It is used as a training facility by United States Marine Corps personnel stationed at Camp Lejeune and Marine Corps Air Station New River.

== History ==
In December 1940, Camp Davis was built by the United States Army as an anti-aircraft artillery training facility. Camp Davis was attached to the First Army, Fourth Corps Area and held a complement of about 20,000 officers and soldiers. It was an expansive facility consisting of more than 3,000 buildings on 45,538 acres (184 km^{2}) with access provided by newly built railroad spurs leading into the camp. Between 1942 and 1943, two 5,000 feet (1,500 m) paved runways were built for Camp Davis Army Air Field (AAF). Part of the runway for the airfield was built through one of the old Civil War fort's walls. Camp Davis AAF's Runway 5/23 was wider and was intended for use by transports, while Runway 19/01 was narrower and intended for use by single-engine aircraft. Most of the aircraft operated from Camp Davis runways were single-engine aircraft used to tow targets for the anti-aircraft artillery units. Women Airforce Service Pilots (or "WASPs") towed targets at Camp Davis. At least two were killed in flying accidents there.

During World War II the Camp Davis housed approximately 550 German prisoners. In 1944 the anti-aircraft training facility was transferred to Fort Bliss, and on 17 February 1946, Camp Davis was closed. In June 1946, a portion of the Camp Davis area formerly used by the Army as the Coastal Artillery Anti-Aircraft Firing Range (present-day Surf City, North Carolina) was transferred to the United States Navy. The Navy temporarily used the site for the development and testing of early surface-to-air missiles under the name Operation Bumblebee until 28 July 1948. Camp Davis was declared surplus and was dismantled for salvage and sale. At that time, the Navy apparently gave up the leases on the land, and it was returned to the original landowners.

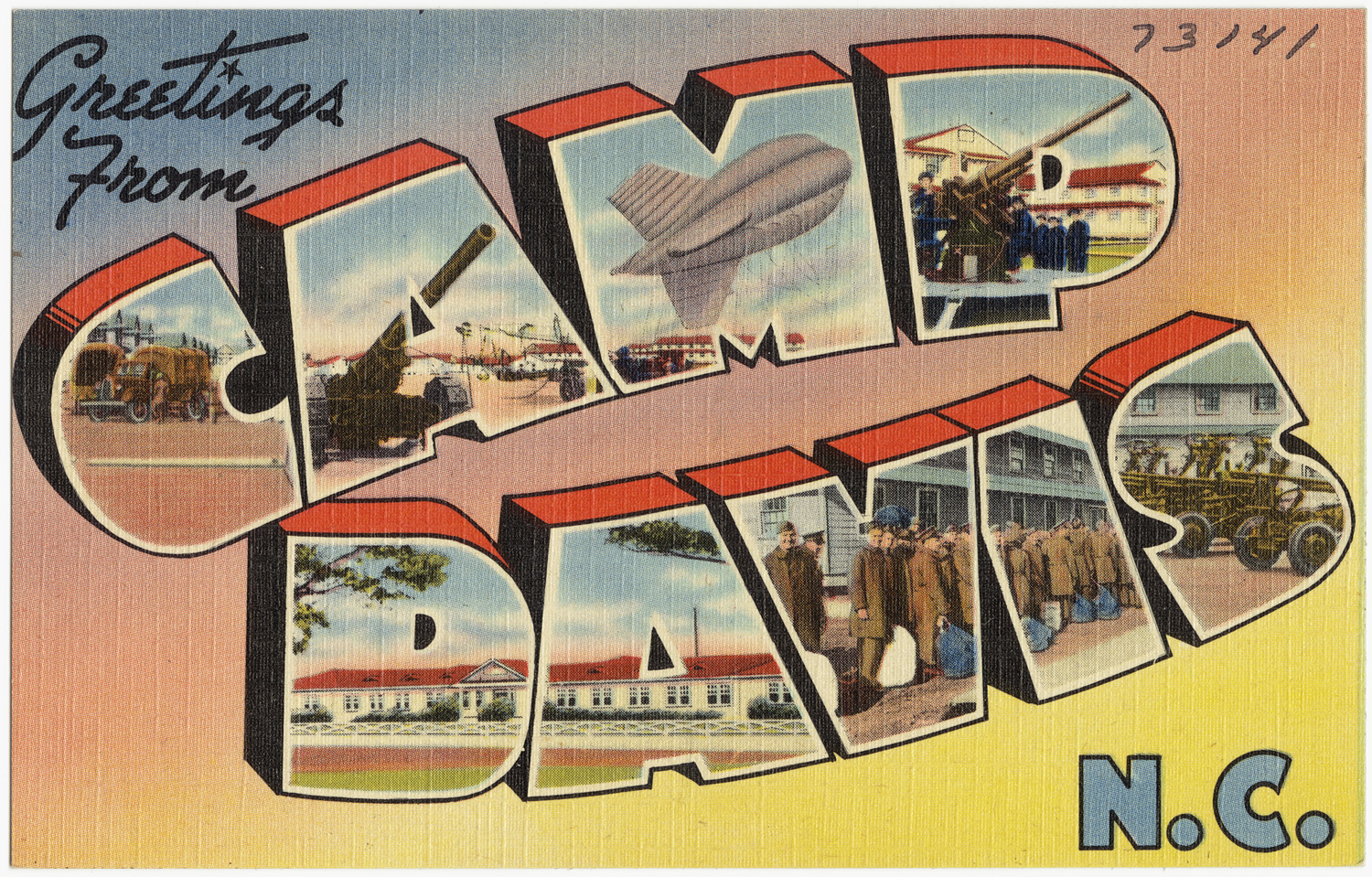
Greetings from Camp Davis large-letter postcard by Curt Teich Co.

In 1954, the Marine Corps took out a new lease for approximately 955 acres (3.86 km^{2}) on the former Camp Davis airfields & surrounding land from International Paper Company. In recent years, the Marine Corps has used Camp Davis as a landing field for helicopter units based at nearby Marine Corps Air Station New River. MCOLF Camp Davis has two runways which are designated 5/23 and 18/36. Both runways have concrete surfaces measuring 5,000 by 150 feet. The older runway 5/23 is not currently in use.

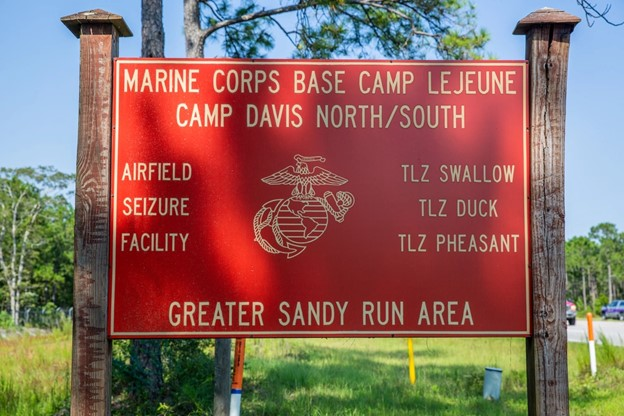
Camp Davis OLF 2024

During a renovation in 2023–2024, the Camp Davis OLF runway was torn up, raised, and resurfaced with three layers of rock, gravel, and asphalt, plus concrete landing pads were added in the middle of the OLF designed to handle high-intensity heat generated during hovering, landing, and turning maneuvers by MV-22B and F-35B aircraft. A Marine Corps press release in August 2024 noted the newly refurbished OLF “… can support every airframe in the Marine Corps’ arsenal to include the KC-130J Hercules transport aircraft, the F-35B Lightning II Joint Strike Fighter, the MV-22B Osprey, and other rotary wing assets. It can even accommodate joint service aviation variants as large as the Air Force's heavy lift C-17A Globemaster III aircraft.”

== See also ==
- List of World War II military service football teams
