= 1942 college football rankings =

- Season: 1942
- Bowl season: 1942–43 bowl games
- End of season champions: Ohio State

One human poll comprised the 1942 college football rankings. Unlike most sports, college football's governing body, the NCAA, does not bestow a national championship, instead that title is bestowed by one or more different polling agencies. There are two main weekly polls that begin in the preseason—the AP Poll and the Coaches' Poll. The Coaches' Poll began operation in 1950; in addition, the AP Poll did not begin conducting preseason polls until that same year.

== Legend ==
	Increase in ranking
	Decrease in ranking
	Not ranked previous week
	National champion
(#–#)	Win–loss record
(Italics)	Number of first place votes
т	Tied with team above or below also with this symbol

== AP Poll ==
The final AP Poll was released on November 30, at the end of the 1942 regular season, weeks before the major bowls. The AP would not release a post-bowl season final poll regularly until 1968.

	Week 1 Oct 12	Week 2 Oct 19	Week 3 Oct 26	Week 4 Nov 2	Week 5 Nov 9	Week 6 Nov 16	Week 7 Nov 23	Week 8 (Final) Nov 30	
1.	Georgia (3–0) (25)	Ohio State (4–0) (58)	Ohio State (5–0) (80)	Georgia (7–0) (84.31)	Georgia (8–0) (85)	Georgia (9–0) (69)	Boston College (8–0) (47)	Ohio State (9–1) (84)	1.
2.	Ohio State (4–0) (12)	Georgia (5–0) (38)	Georgia (6–0) (25)	Wisconsin (6–0–1) (20.33)	Georgia Tech (7–0) (14)	Georgia Tech (8–0) (13)	Georgia Tech (9–0) (50)	Georgia (10–1) (62)	2.
3.	Michigan (2–1) (12)	Alabama (4–0) (8)	Alabama (5–0) (6)	Georgia Tech (6–0) (3.83)	Boston College (6–0) (10)	Boston College (7–0) (37)	Ohio State (8–1) (16)	Wisconsin (8–1–1) (4)	3.
4.	Alabama (3–0) (10)	Michigan (3–1) (2)	Notre Dame (3–1–1) (3)	Notre Dame (4–1–1) (1)	Notre Dame (5–1–1) (1)	Michigan (6–2) (3)	Wisconsin (8–1–1) (2)	Tulsa (10–0) (4)	4.
5.	Illinois (3–0) (18)	Illinois (4–0) (1)	Georgia Tech (5–0) (3)	Boston College (5–0) (13)	Alabama (6–1)	Ohio State (7–1) (1)	Georgia (9–1) (1)	Georgia Tech (9–1)	5.
6.	Georgia Tech (3–0) (5)	Georgia Tech (4–0) (1)	Wisconsin (5–0–1) (1)	Ohio State (5–1)	Michigan (5–2)	Tulsa (8–0) (2)	Tulsa (9–0) (1)	Notre Dame (7–2–1)	6.
7.	Wisconsin (3–0–1)	Wisconsin (4–0–1) (2)	Boston College (4–0) (4)	Minnesota (4–2) (1)	Wisconsin (6–1–1)	Wisconsin (7–1–1)	Alabama (7–2)	Tennessee (8–1–1)	7.
8.	Penn (2–1) (5)	Notre Dame (2–1–1) (3)	Army (4–0) (1)	Alabama (5–1)	Texas (7–1)	Notre Dame (5–2–1)	Notre Dame (6–2–1)	Boston College (8–1)	8.
9.	Colgate (3–0) (2)	Santa Clara (4–0) (2)	TCU (5–0)	Penn (4–1–1) (1)	Tulsa (7–0) (1)	Alabama (6–2)	Michigan (6–3)	Michigan (7–3)	9.
10.	Washington State (3–0) (3)	Boston College (3–0) (4)	Minnesota (3–2)	UCLA (4–2) (1)	Ohio State (6–1) (1)	Minnesota (5–3)	Tennessee (7–1–1)	Alabama (7–3)	10.
11.	Boston College (2–0) (1)	Army (3–0)	UCLA (3–2)	Michigan (4–2)	Tennessee (5–1–1)	Tennessee (6–1–1)	UCLA (5–3)	Texas (8–2)	11.
12.	Vanderbilt (3–0)	TCU (4–0)	Illinois (4–1)	Tulsa (6–0)	Iowa (6–2)	Washington State (6–1) (1)	Santa Clara (7–2) т	Stanford (6–4)	12.
13.	Duquesne (3–0) (2)	Minnesota (2–2)	Michigan (4–1)	Tennessee (4–1–1)	Illinois (5–2)	William & Mary (7–0–1)	Stanford (5–4) т	UCLA (5–3)	13.
14.	Minnesota (1–2) (1)	UCLA (2–2)	Penn (3–1–1)	Texas (6–1)	Washington State (5–1)	Santa Clara (7–1) т	USC (3–3–1)	William & Mary (8–1–1) (1)	14.
15.	Santa Clara (3–0) (1) т	Texas (4–1)	Syracuse (5–0) т	Santa Clara (5–1)	William & Mary (6–0–1)	Texas (7–2) т	Washington State (6–1–1) (1)	Santa Clara (7–2)	15.
16.	Tennessee (2–0–1) (1) т	Mississippi State (2–2)	Tulsa (5–0) т	Baylor (6–1)	Minnesota (4–3)	USC (3–3–1)	Auburn (5–4–1) т	Auburn (6–4–1)	16.
17.	TCU (3–0)	Penn (2–1–1) т	Texas (5–1)	William & Mary (5–0–1)	Penn (4–2–1)	Hardin-Simmons (7–0)	Mississippi State (7–2) т	Washington State (6–1–2)	17.
18.	Army (2–0)	Tennessee (2–1–1) т	William & Mary (4–0–1)	Fresno State (7–0) (1)	UCLA (4–3)	Indiana (5–3) т	Texas (7–2)	Mississippi State (7–2)	18.
19.	Iowa (3–1)	North Carolina (3–0–1)	LSU (5–1)	Army (4–1)	Hardin-Simmons (6–0)	TCU (6–2) т	William & Mary (7–1–1)	Holy Cross (5–4–1) (1) т	19.
20.	Texas (3–1)	Syracuse (4–0)	Tennessee (3–1–1)	Illinois (4–2)	Williams (7–0)	UCLA (4–3) т	Minnesota (5–4)	Minnesota (5–4) т; Penn State (6–1–1) т	20.
	Week 1 Oct 12	Week 2 Oct 19	Week 3 Oct 26	Week 4 Nov 2	Week 5 Nov 9	Week 6 Nov 16	Week 7 Nov 23	Week 8 (Final) Nov 30	
		Dropped: Colgate; Duquesne; Iowa; Vanderbilt; Washington State	Dropped: Mississippi State; North Carolina; Santa Clara	Dropped: LSU; Syracuse; TCU	Dropped: Army; Baylor; Fresno State; Santa Clara	Dropped: Illinois; Iowa; Penn; Williams	Dropped: Hardin-Simmons; Indiana; TCU	Dropped: USC	

== AP Service Poll ==
On December 2, a special panel of 91 sportswriters for the Associated Press released a ranking of the US service academy football teams, as they had not been permitted in the regular 1942 AP poll (this practice would be reversed in 1943). The Great Lakes Naval Training Station football team was awarded service champion, garnering the most overall (812) and 1st place votes (50) in the special poll. The ranking system was ten points to the first place team, nine for 2nd place, and so on, with the sportswriters ranking their top ten. Teams that did not finish in the overall top ten but still received individual votes were also added to the final standings.

Rank	Team	Record	Points
1	Great Lakes Navy	8–3–1	812 (50)
2	Iowa Pre-Flight	7–3	773 (12)
3	Georgia Pre-Flight	7–1–1	743 (28)
4	North Carolina Pre-Flight	8–2–1	591
5	Saint Mary's Pre-Flight	6–3–1	527 (1)
6	Jacksonville NAS	9–3	386
7	Camp Grant	4–5	151
8	Pensacola NAS	3–5–1	115
9	Manhattan Beach	6–0–1	89
10	Corpus Christi NAS	4–3–1	88
11	Second Air Force	11–0–1	80
12	Fort Knox	2–6	66
13	Lakehurst NAS	4–4–1	43
14	Fort Monmouth	5–2–2	35
15	Fort Riley	6–3	13
16	Camp Davis	4–3–2	6
17	March Field	5–2	5
18 т	Fort Totten	3–5–1	2
18 т	Spence Field	0–4	2
20 т	Camp Shelby	0–0?	1
20 т	Fort Douglas	5–3	1
20 т	Daniel Field	0–6	1

- In parentheses is the number of 1st place votes

== Litkenhous Ratings ==
The final Litkenhous Ratings were released in January 1943, after the bowl games had been played. The top 30 ranked teams were:

1. Ohio State (112.0)
2. Georgia (111.2)
3. Michigan (107.7)
4. Great Lakes Navy (106.4)
5. Alabama (105.7)
6. Notre Dame (105.6)
7. Wisconsin (104.9)
8. Tennessee (104.9)
9. Georgia Tech (104.6)
10. Minnesota (104.6)
11. Georgia Pre-Flight (101.7)
12. Illinois (101.3)
13. Iowa Pre-Flight (100.9)
14. Texas (100.8)
15. Tulsa (100.7)
16. Mississippi State (99.5)
17. Indiana (99.3)
18. Boston College (98.8)
19. LSU (97.5)
20. Duke (97.2)
21. Rice (96.1)
22. Penn (95.8)
23. Stanford (95.1)
24. Auburn (94.9)
25. North Carolina Pre-Flight (94.7)
26. Iowa (93.5)
27. Vanderbilt (93.4)
28. UCLA (93.2)
29. Army (93.2)
30. Missouri (93.1)

== Williamson System ==
The final Williamson System rankings for 1942 were issued in January 1943, after the bowl games.

1. Georgia (98.1)
2. Wisconsin (97.1)
3. Ohio State (96.8)
4. Texas (96.0)
5. Georgia Tech (95.7)
6. Michigan (95.5)
7. Alabama (95.3)
8. Tennessee (95.0)
9. Notre Dame (94.7)
10. Tulsa (94.4)
11. Mississippi State (94.2)
12. Rice (93.8)
13. Boston College (93.5)
14. Marquette (93.3)
15. Auburn (93.1)
16. Penn State (93.0)
17. LSU (92.9)
18. Fordham (92.8)
19. William & Mary (92.4)
20. Missouri (92.3)
21. Illinois (92.1)
22. Navy (91.8)
23. Indiana (91.4)
24. Hardin–Simmons (91.2)
25. Duke (91.1)
26. Baylor (91.0)
27. Penn (90.7)
28. TCU (90.6)
29. UCLA (90.4)
30. Army (90.3)
31. Texas A&M (90.2)
32. Minnesota (90.1)
33. Colgate (90.0)
34. Washington State (89.8)
35. Santa Clara (89.6)
36. Tulane (89.5)
37. Stanford (89.3)
38. Vanderbilt (89.2)
39. North Carolina (89.1)
40. Oklahoma A&M (89.0)
41. Wake Forest (88.8)
42. USC (88.7)
43. Iowa (88.6)
44. Texas Tech (88.6)
45. California (88.5)
46. VPI (88.5)
47. Saint Mary's (88.3)
48. Detroit (88.1)
49. Duquesne (87.9)
50. Syracuse (87.8)
51. Villanova (87.6)
52. Michigan State (87.5)
53. Cornell (87.4)
54. Georgetown (87.1)
55. Amherst (87.0)

Williamson also separately ranked the top service teams as follows:

1. Georgia Pre-Flight (96.4)
2. Great Lakes Navy (94.7)
3. North Carolina Pre-Flight (92.6)
4. Second Air Force (92.3)
5. Iowa Pre-Flight (91.7)
6. Jacksonville NAS (91.5)
7. Manhattan Beach Coast Guard (88.0)
8. Corpus Christi NAS (85.6)
9. Saint Mary's Pre-Flight (85.4)
10. Pensacola NAS (83.4)
11. Camp Grant (83.1)
12. Lakehurst NAS (82.5)
13. Fort Riley (82.0)
14. Fort Monmouth (81.4)
15. March Field (79.2)
16. Fort Knox (78.5)
17. Santa Ana Air Force (77.9)
18. Camp Davis (77.6)

== See also ==
- 1942 College Football All-America Team
