= North Carolina Pre-Flight Cloudbusters football =

World War II college football team

The North Carolina Pre-Flight Cloudbusters represented the U.S. Navy pre-flight school at the University of North Carolina at Chapel Hill in the college football seasons of 1942, 1943 and 1944 during World War II. The North Carolina Pre-Flight School was established on February 1, 1942, by the Secretary of the Navy and opened that April. The football team was later organized and competed against other military teams in addition to major college teams of the period. During their three years in existence, the Cloudbusters compiled an overall record of sixteen wins, eight losses and three ties (16–8–3).

North Carolina Pre-Flight was coached by one of Notre Dame's former "Four Horsemen" and Fordham head coach Jim Crowley in 1942 and went 8–2–1. The Cloudbusters were coached by former Baylor head coach Frank Kimbrough in 1943 and went 2–4–1. In 1944, they were led by Glenn Killinger and went 6–2–1. The Cloudbusters were also known for having both future College Football Hall of Fame inductees Johnny Vaught and Bear Bryant serve as assistant coaches in 1942 and 1944 respectively. Vaught went on to coach at Ole Miss, and while there won the 1960 national championship and compiled an overall record of 190 wins, 61 losses and 12 ties (190–61–12). Bryant went on to coach at Maryland, Kentucky, Texas A&M and Alabama, and during his career won the 1961, 1964, 1965, 1973, 1978 and 1979 national championships and compiled an overall record of 323 wins, 85 losses and 17 ties (323–85–17).

== 1942 season ==
1942 North Carolina Pre-Flight Cloudbusters football
- Conference: Independent

Ranking
- AP: No. 4 (APS)
- Record: 8–2–1
- Head coach: Jim Crowley (1st season)

The 1942 Cloudbusters squad was led by former Fordham head coach Jim Crowley. Members of Crowley's staff included: Charles R. Soleau as backs coach, Ed Sosky as ends coach, and George McGaughey, N. J. Pierce and Johnny Vaught as line coaches. The squad finished the season with an overall record of eight wins, two losses and one tie (8–2–1).

After the Cloudbusters opened the season with a 13–2 victory over Catawba, they traveled to Boston and shutout Harvard, 13–0, before 7,000 fans. After a tie against Georgia Pre-Flight and a victory against NC State, the Cloudbusters lost their first game of the season against Boston College 7–6. Following their loss against the Eagles, they ran for 272 yards in a 34–0 victory over Temple before 20,000 fans in Philadelphia. The Cloudbusters would then only allow seven points over the next four games leading to their season finale against Crowley's former school, Fordham. Before 24,500 fans at Yankee Stadium, the Cadets were upset 6–0 in a defensive struggle with the only points of the game coming on a Steve Filipowicz touchdown run in the first half.

Date	Opponent	Site	Result	Attendance	Source
September 12	vs. Catawba	Winston-Salem, NC	W 13–2		
September 26	at Harvard	Harvard Stadium; Boston, MA	W 13–0	12,000	
October 3	at Georgia Pre-Flight	Sanford Stadium; Athens, GA	T 14–14	7,500	
October 10	at NC State	Riddick Stadium; Raleigh, NC	W 19–7	10,000	
October 17	at No. 11 Boston College	Fenway Park; Boston, MA	L 6–7	25,107	
October 23	at Temple	Temple Stadium; Philadelphia, PA	W 34–0	20,000	
October 31	at Syracuse	Archbold Stadium; Syracuse, NY	W 9–0	10,000	
November 7	at Georgetown	Griffith Stadium; Washington, DC	W 23–7	12,000	
November 14	at Manhattan	Polo Grounds; New York, NY	W 17–0		
November 21	at No. 13 William & Mary	Cary Field; Williamsburg, VA	W 14–0	10,000	
November 28	at Fordham	Yankee Stadium; Bronx, NY	L 0–6	24,500	
Rankings from AP Poll released prior to the game

Games against both Colgate and Iowa Pre-Flight included in the original schedule were canceled by the end of the season.

== 1943 season ==
1943 North Carolina Pre-Flight Cloudbusters football
- Conference: Independent
- Record: 2–4–1
- Head coach: Frank Kimbrough (1st season)
- Home stadium: Kenan Memorial Stadium

The 1943 Cloudbusters squad was led by former Baylor head coach Frank Kimbrough. The squad finished the season with an overall record of two wins, four losses and one tie (2–4–1). The Cadets opened their 1943 season with a pair of shutout losses. The first was a 31–0 loss to Navy before 12,231 at Thompson Stadium in Annapolis, Maryland, and the second was a 42–0 loss to Duke in Durham. The Cloudbusters rebounded with a victory over Camp Davis only to lose their next two contests. The squad then finished the season with a tie against Camp Lejeune and a 21–7 victory over NC State.

In the final Litkenhous Ratings, North Carolina Pre-Flight ranked 79th among the nation's college and service teams with a rating of 73.9.

Date	Time	Opponent	Site	Result	Attendance	Source
September 25		at Navy	Thompson Stadium; Annapolis, MD	L 0–31	12,231	
October 2		at Duke	Duke Stadium; Durham, NC	L 0–42	6,179	
October 16	2:30 p.m.	Camp Davis	Kenan Memorial Stadium; Chapel Hill, NC	W 23–18		
October 23		Georgia Pre-Flight	Kenan Memorial Stadium; Chapel Hill, NC	L 7–20	5,000	
November 6		Wake Forest	Groves Stadium; Wake Forest, NC	L 12–20	5,000	
November 13	2:30 p.m.	Camp Lejeune	Kenan Memorial Stadium; Chapel Hill, NC	T 14–14		
November 25		at NC State	Riddick Stadium; Raleigh, NC	W 21–7	3,000	
All times are in Eastern time

The game against Virginia Tech at Victory Stadium in Roanoke, Virginia included in the original schedule was canceled by the end of the season.

== 1944 season ==
1944 North Carolina Pre-Flight Cloudbusters football
- Conference: Independent
- Record: 6–2–1
- Head coach: Glenn Killinger (1st season)
- Home stadium: Kenan Memorial Stadium

The 1944 Cloudbusters squad was led by head coach Glenn Killinger. Members of Killinger's staff included: Glenn Presnell as backs coach, John Roning as ends coach, and Bear Bryant as line coach. The squad finished the season with an overall record of six wins, two losses and one tie (6–2–1).

The cadets opened the season with a 27–14 victory over Cherry Point Marines, and the next week upset national championship favorite Navy before 10,000 fans at Annapolis, Maryland. In the victory over the Midshipmen, Otto Graham threw a lateral pass to Frank Aschenbrenner who ran it 55-yards for the game-winning score. The next week, the squad defeated Duke, 13–6, for a second consecutive upset. As a result of these upsets, the Cloudbusters earned the No. 2 ranking in the first AP Poll of the 1944 season.

After being held to a tie against Virginia, the Cloudbusters rebounded with a 3–0 victory over Georgia Pre-Flight after Buell St. John connected on a short field goal with only seven seconds remaining in the game. After a victory over Jacksonville NAS, the cadets suffered their first loss of the season in a 49–20 loss against Bainbridge NTS. The Cloudbusters responded the following week with a 33–18 victory over Georgia Pre-Flight, with Graham throwing for three touchdowns and running for one in the contest. The cadets then finished the season with a loss against Camp Peary.

In the final Litkenhous Ratings, North Carolina Pre-Flight ranked 40th among the nation's college and service teams and seventh out of 28 United States Navy teams with a rating of 93.3.

Date	Time	Opponent	Rank	Site	Result	Attendance	Source
September 24	2:30 p.m.	Cherry Point Marines		Kenan Memorial Stadium; Chapel Hill, NC	W 27–14	8,000	
September 30	2:30 p.m.	at Navy		Thompson Stadium; Annapolis, MD	W 21–14		
October 7		at Duke		Duke Stadium; Durham, NC	W 13–6	19,000	
October 14		at Virginia	No. 2	Scott Stadium; Charlottesville, VA	T 13–13	9,000	
October 21		Georgia Pre-Flight	No. 10	Kenan Memorial Stadium; Chapel Hill, NC	W 3–0		
October 28	3:30 p.m.	at Jacksonville NAS	No. 9	Mason Field; Jacksonville, FL	W 14–13		
November 5	2:30 p.m.	No. 12 Bainbridge	No. 8	Kenan Memorial Stadium; Chapel Hill, NC	L 20–49		
November 11		at Georgia Pre-Flight	No. 16	Sanford Stadium; Athens, GA	W 33–18		
November 18	2:30 p.m.	Camp Peary	No. 18	Kenan Memorial Stadium; Chapel Hill, NC	L 7–19		
Rankings from AP Poll released prior to the game; All times are in Eastern time

=== Rankings ===
Ranking movements Legend: ██ Increase in ranking ██ Decrease in ranking — = Not ranked т = Tied with team above or below ( ) = First-place votes
	Week								
Poll	1	2	3	4	5	6	7	8	Final
AP	2 (24)	10	9	8	16	18т	20	—	—

== 1945 season ==
The 1945 Cloudbusters squad was to have been led by head coach Bear Bryant. However, Bryant never served as the head coach at Carolina after the Navy dropped the football program there in August 1945. Bryant took the head coaching position with Maryland, and 14 players he coached at the Pre-Flight School enrolled to play for him at Maryland after they were discharged from the service.
