= List of Fordham Rams football seasons =

The following is a list of Fordham Rams football seasons for the football team that has represented Fordham University in NCAA competition during their years as a Division I-A/FBS program.

== Seasons (1928 - 1954) ==
Year	Overall record	Coach	Conference	Conference record	Bowl/Playoffs	National Ranking	Attendance Avg.
1928	4–5	Frank W. Cavanaugh	Northeastern Independent	N/A			22,400
1929	7–0–2	Frank Cavanaugh	Northeastern Independent	N/A			29,167
1930	8–1	Frank Cavanaugh	Northeastern Independent	N/A			42,000
1931	6–1–2	Frank Cavanaugh	Northeastern Independent	N/A			33,600
1932	6–2	Frank Cavanaugh	Northeastern Independent	N/A			23,000
1933	6–2	Jim Crowley	Northeastern Independent	N/A			38,000
1934	5–3	Jim Crowley	Northeastern Independent	N/A			29,286
1935	6–1–2	Jim Crowley	Northeastern Independent	N/A		11th - UP Poll	30,722
1936	5–1–2	Jim Crowley	Northeastern Independent	N/A		15th - AP Poll	34,625
1937	7–0–1	Jim Crowley	Northeastern Independent	N/A		3rd - AP Poll	33,429
1938	6–1–2	Jim Crowley	Northeastern Independent	N/A		15th - AP Poll	26,035
1939	6–2	Jim Crowley	Northeastern Independent	N/A		17th - AP Poll	31,106
1940	7–2	Jim Crowley	Northeastern Independent	N/A	Cotton	12th - AP Poll	24,736
1941	8–1	Jim Crowley	Northeastern Independent	N/A	Sugar	6th - AP Poll	28,667
1942	5–3–1	Earl Walsh	Northeastern Independent	N/A			18,167
1946	0–7	Ed Danowski	Northeastern Independent	N/A			29,399
1947	1–6–1	Ed Danowski	Northeastern Independent	N/A			14,967
1948	3–6	Ed Danowski	Northeastern Independent	N/A			16,000
1949	5–3	Ed Danowski	Northeastern Independent	N/A			18,031
1950	8–1	Ed Danowski	Northeastern Independent	N/A			9,876
1951	5–4	Ed Danowski	Northeastern Independent	N/A			13,750
1952	2–5–1	Ed Danowski	Northeastern Independent	N/A			8,067
1953	4–5	Ed Danowski	Northeastern Independent	N/A			16,079
1954	1–7–1	Ed Danowski	Northeastern Independent	N/A			11,950

Fordham, which had previously suspended football during the 1943–1945 seasons due to World War II, dropped the program entirely following the 1954 season. Students brought the sport back as a club team in 1964. The university again granted varsity status in 1970. The program played at the D-III level until finally regaining Division I status in 1989.

The following is a list of Fordham Rams football seasons for the football team that has represented Fordham University in NCAA competition during their years as a Division I-AA/FCS program.

== Seasons (1989 - Present) ==
Year	Overall record	Coach	Conference	Conference record	Bowl/Playoffs	National Ranking	Attendance Avg.
1989	2–6	Larry Glueck	I-AA Independent	N/A			5,068
1990	1–9	Larry Glueck	Patriot League	0–5			4,227
1991	2–8	Larry Glueck	Patriot League	0–5			4,419
1992	1–9	Larry Glueck	Patriot League	1–4			4,235
1993	1–10	Larry Glueck	Patriot League	1–4			2,792
1994	0–11	Nick Quartaro	Patriot League	0–5			2,112
1995	4–6–1	Nick Quartaro	Patriot League	2–3			2,369
1996	2–8	Nick Quartaro	Patriot League	1–3			3,368
1997	5–6	Nick Quartaro	Patriot League	4–2			2,944
1998	4–7	Ken O'Keefe	Patriot League	2–4			3,719
1999	0–11	Dave Clawson	Patriot League	0–6			3,740
2000	3–8	Dave Clawson	Patriot League	1–5			4,179
2001	7–4	Dave Clawson	Patriot League	5–2			4,752
2002	10–3	Dave Clawson	Patriot League	6–1	Quarterfinals	12th - TSN Poll	4,090
2003	9–3	Dave Clawson	Patriot League	4–3			4,932
2004	5–6	Ed Foley	Patriot League	2–4			4,080
2005	2–9	Ed Foley	Patriot League	2–4			4,560
2006	3–8	Tom Masella	Patriot League	1–5			3,723
2007	8–4	Tom Masella	Patriot League	5–1	First Round	20th - TSN Poll	4,509
2008	5–6	Tom Masella	Patriot League	1–5			4,077
2009	5–6	Tom Masella	Patriot League	2–4			3,866
2010	5–6	Tom Masella	Patriot League	0–0			3,722
2011	1–10	Tom Masella	Patriot League	0–0			4,793
2012	6–5	Joe Moorhead	Patriot League	0–0			4,463
2013	12–2	Joe Moorhead	Patriot League	0–0	Second Round	9th - TSN Poll	6,277
2014	11–3	Joe Moorhead	Patriot League	6–0	Second Round	11th - TSN Poll	4,663
2015	9–2	Joe Moorhead	Patriot League	5–1	First Round	19th - STATS Poll	6,499
2016	8–3	Andrew Breiner	Patriot League	5–1			5,416
2017	4–7	Andrew Breiner	Patriot League	3–3			4,681
2018	2–9	Joe Conlin	Patriot League	2–4			3,964
2019	4–8	Joe Conlin	Patriot League	2–4			3,408
2020	2–1	Joe Conlin	Patriot League (North Division)	1–1			0
2021	6–5	Joe Conlin	Patriot League	4–2			3,454
2022	9–3	Joe Conlin	Patriot League	5–1	First Round	16th - FCS Coaches Poll	2,670
2023	6–5	Joe Conlin	Patriot League	2–4			2,883
2024	2–10	Joe Conlin	Patriot League	2–4			2,203
2025	1–11	Joe Conlin	Patriot League	1–6			3,094

Fordham, a Patriot League football member since 1990, was ruled ineligible for conference titles between the 2010–2013 seasons. This was due to use of scholarship players prior to the rest of the league's vote to do the same. League games during this time counted in the overall record but not in the conference standings.
