= 1942 Army Cadets football team =

American college football season

1942 Army Cadets football
- Conference: Independent
- Record: 6–3
- Head coach: Earl Blaik (2nd season)
- Captain: Henry Mazur
- Home stadium: Michie Stadium

1942 Eastern college football independents records
	Conf.			Overall
Team	W	L	T	W		L		T
Williams		–		7	–	1	–	0
No. 19 Penn State		–		6	–	1	–	1
No. 8 Boston College		–		8	–	2	–	0
Buffalo		–		6	–	2	–	0
Bucknell		–		6	–	2	–	1
Colgate		–		6	–	2	–	1
Army		–		6	–	3	–	0
Syracuse		–		6	–	3	–	0
Duquesne		–		6	–	3	–	1
Yale		–		5	–	3	–	0
Fordham		–		5	–	3	–	1
Penn		–		5	–	3	–	1
No. T–19 Holy Cross		–		5	–	4	–	1
Dartmouth		–		5	–	4	–	0
Brown		–		4	–	4	–	0
Villanova		–		4	–	4	–	0
Vermont		–		4	–	3	–	0
Carnegie Tech		–		3	–	3	–	0
Boston University		–		4	–	5	–	0
Cornell		–		3	–	5	–	1
Princeton		–		3	–	5	–	1
Temple		–		2	–	5	–	3
Columbia		–		3	–	6	–	0
Pittsburgh		–		3	–	6	–	0
Tufts		–		2	–	5	–	1
Franklin & Marshall		–		1	–	4	–	2
Massachusetts State		–		2	–	5	–	0
Harvard		–		2	–	6	–	1
Manhattan		–		2	–	6	–	0
CCNY		–		1	–	7	–	1
Rankings from AP Poll

The 1942 Army Cadets football team represented the United States Military Academy as an independent during the 1942 college football season. In their second year under head coach Earl Blaik, the Cadets compiled a 6–3 record and outscored their opponents by a combined total of 149 to 74. In the annual Army–Navy Game, the Cadets lost to the Midshipmen by a 14 to 0 score. The Cadets also lost to Penn and Notre Dame.

Four Army players were honored on the 1942 College Football All-America Team. Tackle Robin Olds was selected as a first-team player by Grantland Rice for Collier's Weekly. Tackle Francis E. Merritt was selected as a second-team player by both the Central Press Association (CP) and the Newspaper Enterprise Association (NEA) and was later inducted into the College Football Hall of Fame. Halfback Henry Mazur was selected as a second-team player by the International News Service (INS). End James Kelleher was selected as a third-team player by the Sporting News and NEA.

Army was ranked at No. 28 (out of 590 college and military teams) in the final rankings under the Litkenhous Difference by Score System for 1942.

== Schedule ==
Date	Opponent	Rank	Site	Result	Attendance
October 3	Lafayette		Michie Stadium; West Point, NY	W 14–0	7,000
October 10	Cornell		Michie Stadium; West Point, NY	W 28–8	
October 17	at Columbia	No. 18	Baker Field; New York, NY	W 34–6	
October 24	at Harvard	No. 11	Harvard Stadium; Boston, MA	W 14–0	
October 31	at No. 14 Penn	No. 8	Franklin Field; Philadelphia, PA	L 0–19	
November 7	vs. No. 4 Notre Dame	No. 19	Yankee Stadium; Bronx, NY (rivalry)	L 0–13	74,946
November 14	VPI		Michie Stadium; West Point, NY	W 19–7	10,000
November 21	vs. Princeton		Yankee Stadium; Bronx, NY	W 40–7	
November 28	at Navy		Thompson Stadium; Annapolis, MD (Army–Navy Game)	L 0–14	
Rankings from AP Poll released prior to the game

== Rankings ==
Ranking movements Legend: ██ Increase in ranking ██ Decrease in ranking — = Not ranked ( ) = First-place votes
	Week							
Poll	1	2	3	4	5	6	7	Final
AP	18	11	8 (1)	19	—	—	—	—
