= 1942 Penn State Nittany Lions football team =

American college football season

1942 Penn State Nittany Lions football
- Conference: Independent

Ranking
- AP: No. 19
- Record: 6–1–1
- Head coach: Bob Higgins (13th season)
- Captain: Lou Palazzi
- Home stadium: New Beaver Field

1942 Eastern college football independents records
	Conf.			Overall
Team	W	L	T	W		L		T
Williams		–		7	–	1	–	0
No. 19 Penn State		–		6	–	1	–	1
No. 8 Boston College		–		8	–	2	–	0
Buffalo		–		6	–	2	–	0
Bucknell		–		6	–	2	–	1
Colgate		–		6	–	2	–	1
Army		–		6	–	3	–	0
Syracuse		–		6	–	3	–	0
Duquesne		–		6	–	3	–	1
Yale		–		5	–	3	–	0
Fordham		–		5	–	3	–	1
Penn		–		5	–	3	–	1
No. T–19 Holy Cross		–		5	–	4	–	1
Dartmouth		–		5	–	4	–	0
Brown		–		4	–	4	–	0
Villanova		–		4	–	4	–	0
Vermont		–		4	–	3	–	0
Carnegie Tech		–		3	–	3	–	0
Boston University		–		4	–	5	–	0
Cornell		–		3	–	5	–	1
Princeton		–		3	–	5	–	1
Temple		–		2	–	5	–	3
Columbia		–		3	–	6	–	0
Pittsburgh		–		3	–	6	–	0
Tufts		–		2	–	5	–	1
Franklin & Marshall		–		1	–	4	–	2
Massachusetts State		–		2	–	5	–	0
Harvard		–		2	–	6	–	1
Manhattan		–		2	–	6	–	0
CCNY		–		1	–	7	–	1
Rankings from AP Poll

The 1942 Penn State Nittany Lions football team represented the Pennsylvania State College as an independent during the 1942 college football season. The team was coached by Bob Higgins.

Penn State was ranked at No. 68 (out of 590 college and military teams) in the final rankings under the Litkenhous Difference by Score System for 1942.

The team played its home games in New Beaver Field in State College, Pennsylvania.

== Schedule ==
Date	Opponent	Site	Result	Attendance	Source
October 3	Bucknell	New Beaver Field; State College, PA	W 14–7	10,303	
October 10	at Lehigh	Taylor Stadium; Bethlehem, PA	W 19–3	7,000	
October 17	at Cornell	Schoellkopf Field; Ithaca, NY	T 0–0	5,000	
October 24	Colgate^{†}	New Beaver Field; State College, PA	W 13–10	11,510	
October 31	at West Virginia	Mountaineer Field; Morgantown, WV (rivalry)	L 0–24	12,016	
November 7	Syracuse	New Beaver Field; State College, PA (rivalry)	W 18–13	8,856	
November 14	at No. 17 Penn	Franklin Field; Philadelphia, PA	W 13–7	50,000	
November 21	Pittsburgh	New Beaver Field; State College, PA (rivalry)	W 14–6	11,710	
^{†}Homecoming; Rankings from AP Poll released prior to the game

== Rankings ==
Ranking movements Legend: ██ Increase in ranking ██ Decrease in ranking — = Not ranked т = Tied with team above or below
	Week							
Poll	1	2	3	4	5	6	7	Final
AP	—	—	—	—	—	—	—	19т
