= 1942 Boston University Terriers football team =

American college football season

1942 Boston University Terriers football
- Conference: Independent
- Record: 4–5
- Head coach: Walt Holmer (1st season)
- Home stadium: Nickerson Field

1942 Eastern college football independents records
	Conf.			Overall
Team	W	L	T	W		L		T
Williams		–		7	–	1	–	0
No. 19 Penn State		–		6	–	1	–	1
No. 8 Boston College		–		8	–	2	–	0
Buffalo		–		6	–	2	–	0
Bucknell		–		6	–	2	–	1
Colgate		–		6	–	2	–	1
Army		–		6	–	3	–	0
Syracuse		–		6	–	3	–	0
Duquesne		–		6	–	3	–	1
Yale		–		5	–	3	–	0
Fordham		–		5	–	3	–	1
Penn		–		5	–	3	–	1
No. T–19 Holy Cross		–		5	–	4	–	1
Dartmouth		–		5	–	4	–	0
Brown		–		4	–	4	–	0
Villanova		–		4	–	4	–	0
Vermont		–		4	–	3	–	0
Carnegie Tech		–		3	–	3	–	0
Boston University		–		4	–	5	–	0
Cornell		–		3	–	5	–	1
Princeton		–		3	–	5	–	1
Temple		–		2	–	5	–	3
Columbia		–		3	–	6	–	0
Pittsburgh		–		3	–	6	–	0
Tufts		–		2	–	5	–	1
Franklin & Marshall		–		1	–	4	–	2
Massachusetts State		–		2	–	5	–	0
Harvard		–		2	–	6	–	1
Manhattan		–		2	–	6	–	0
CCNY		–		1	–	7	–	1
Rankings from AP Poll

The 1942 Boston University Terriers football team was an American football team that represented Boston University as an independent during the 1942 college football season. The team compiled a 4–5 record and were outscored by a total of 94 to 88.

Walt Holmer was hired as the team's head coach in January 1942. He replaced Pat Hanley who was called to duty with the Marine Corps. Holmer had been the team's backfield coach for the prior eight years. Holmer later resigned his post in March 1943 to enter the Naval Reserve.

Boston University was ranked at No. 175 (out of 590 college and military teams) in the final rankings under the Litkenhous Difference by Score System for 1942.

== Schedule ==
Date	Opponent	Site	Result	Attendance	Source
September 26	American International	Nickerson Field; Weston, MA	W 6–0		
October 3	at Syracuse	Archbold Stadium; Syracuse, NY	L 0–25	10,000	
October 10	Western Maryland	Nickerson Field; Weston, MA	L 0–7		
October 17	Tufts^{†}	Nickerson Field; Weston, MA	W 6–0		
October 24	Bucknell	Nickerson Field; Weston, MA	L 7–13		
October 31	at Cincinnati	Nippert Stadium; Cincinnati, OH	L 0–6		
November 7	Northeastern	Nickerson Field; Weston, MA	W 37–6		
November 14	Quonset NAS	Nickerson Field; Weston, MA	W 32–0		
November 21	at No. 3 Boston College	Fenway Park; Boston, MA (rivalry)	L 0–37	10,000	
^{†}Homecoming; Rankings from AP Poll released prior to the game
