= 1942 Dartmouth Indians football team =

American college football season

1942 Dartmouth Indians football
- Conference: Independent
- Record: 5–4
- Head coach: Tuss McLaughry (2nd season)
- Captain: Edward Kast
- Home stadium: Memorial Field

1942 Eastern college football independents records
	Conf.			Overall
Team	W	L	T	W		L		T
Williams		–		7	–	1	–	0
No. 19 Penn State		–		6	–	1	–	1
No. 8 Boston College		–		8	–	2	–	0
Buffalo		–		6	–	2	–	0
Bucknell		–		6	–	2	–	1
Colgate		–		6	–	2	–	1
Army		–		6	–	3	–	0
Syracuse		–		6	–	3	–	0
Duquesne		–		6	–	3	–	1
Yale		–		5	–	3	–	0
Fordham		–		5	–	3	–	1
Penn		–		5	–	3	–	1
No. T–19 Holy Cross		–		5	–	4	–	1
Dartmouth		–		5	–	4	–	0
Brown		–		4	–	4	–	0
Villanova		–		4	–	4	–	0
Vermont		–		4	–	3	–	0
Carnegie Tech		–		3	–	3	–	0
Boston University		–		4	–	5	–	0
Cornell		–		3	–	5	–	1
Princeton		–		3	–	5	–	1
Temple		–		2	–	5	–	3
Columbia		–		3	–	6	–	0
Pittsburgh		–		3	–	6	–	0
Tufts		–		2	–	5	–	1
Franklin & Marshall		–		1	–	4	–	2
Massachusetts State		–		2	–	5	–	0
Harvard		–		2	–	6	–	1
Manhattan		–		2	–	6	–	0
CCNY		–		1	–	7	–	1
Rankings from AP Poll

The 1942 Dartmouth Indians football team was an American football team that represented Dartmouth College as an independent during the 1942 college football season. In their second and final season under head coach Tuss McLaughry, the Indians compiled a 5–4 record. Edward Kast was the team captain.

Tom Douglas was the team's leading scorer, with 42 points (seven touchdowns).

Dartmouth was ranked at No. 53 (out of 590 college and military teams) in the final rankings under the Litkenhous Difference by Score System for 1942.

Dartmouth played its home games at Memorial Field on the college campus in Hanover, New Hampshire.

== Schedule ==
Date	Opponent	Site	Result	Attendance	Source
September 26	at Holy Cross	Fitton Field; Worcester, MA	W 17–6	25,000	
October 3	Miami (OH)	Memorial Field; Hanover, NH	W 58–7		
October 10	Colgate	Memorial Field; Hanover, NH	L 19–27	10,000	
October 17	at Harvard	Harvard Stadium; Boston, MA (rivalry)	W 14–2	26,000	
October 24	at Yale	Yale Bowl; New Haven, CT	L 7–17	22,000	
October 31	No. 18 William & Mary	Memorial Field; Hanover, NH	L 14–35	7,000	
November 7	at Princeton	Palmer Stadium; Princeton, NJ	W 19–7	16,000	
November 14	vs. Cornell	Civic Stadium; Buffalo, NY (rivalry)	L 19–21	13,000	
November 21	at Columbia	Baker Field; New York, NY	W 26–13	10,000	
Rankings from AP Poll released prior to the game
