= 1942 Holy Cross Crusaders football team =

American college football season

1942 Holy Cross Crusaders football
- Conference: Independent

Ranking
- AP: No. T–19
- Record: 5–4–1
- Head coach: Ank Scanlan (1st season)
- Home stadium: Fitton Field

1942 Eastern college football independents records
	Conf.			Overall
Team	W	L	T	W		L		T
Williams		–		7	–	1	–	0
No. 19 Penn State		–		6	–	1	–	1
No. 8 Boston College		–		8	–	2	–	0
Buffalo		–		6	–	2	–	0
Bucknell		–		6	–	2	–	1
Colgate		–		6	–	2	–	1
Army		–		6	–	3	–	0
Syracuse		–		6	–	3	–	0
Duquesne		–		6	–	3	–	1
Yale		–		5	–	3	–	0
Fordham		–		5	–	3	–	1
Penn		–		5	–	3	–	1
No. T–19 Holy Cross		–		5	–	4	–	1
Dartmouth		–		5	–	4	–	0
Brown		–		4	–	4	–	0
Villanova		–		4	–	4	–	0
Vermont		–		4	–	3	–	0
Carnegie Tech		–		3	–	3	–	0
Boston University		–		4	–	5	–	0
Cornell		–		3	–	5	–	1
Princeton		–		3	–	5	–	1
Temple		–		2	–	5	–	3
Columbia		–		3	–	6	–	0
Pittsburgh		–		3	–	6	–	0
Tufts		–		2	–	5	–	1
Franklin & Marshall		–		1	–	4	–	2
Massachusetts State		–		2	–	5	–	0
Harvard		–		2	–	6	–	1
Manhattan		–		2	–	6	–	0
CCNY		–		1	–	7	–	1
Rankings from AP Poll

The 1942 Holy Cross Crusaders football team was an American football team that represented the College of the Holy Cross as an independent during the 1942 college football season. In its first year under head coach Ank Scanlan, the team compiled a 5–4–1 record.

Holy Cross was ranked at No. 41 (out of 590 college and military teams) in the final rankings under the Litkenhous Difference by Score System for 1942.

The team played its home games at Fitton Field in Worcester, Massachusetts.

== Schedule ==
Date	Opponent	Site	Result	Attendance	Source
September 26	Dartmouth	Fitton Field; Worcester, MA	L 6–17	25,000	
October 3	Duquesne	Fitton Field; Worcester, MA	L 0–25		
October 10	Fort Totten	Fitton Field; Worcester, MA	W 60–0	6,000	
October 17	Syracuse	Fitton Field; Worcester, MA	L 0–19	10,000	
October 24	NC State	Fitton Field; Worcester, MA	W 28–0	7,500	
October 31	Colgate	Fitton Field; Worcester, MA	T 6–6		
November 7	at Brown	Brown Stadium; Providence, RI	L 14–20		
November 14	at Temple	Temple Stadium; Philadelphia, PA	W 13–0		
November 21	Manhattan	Fitton Field; Worcester, MA	W 28–0		
November 28	at No. 1 Boston College	Fenway Park; Boston, MA	W 55–12	30,000	
Rankings from AP Poll released prior to the game

== Rankings ==
Ranking movements Legend: ██ Increase in ranking ██ Decrease in ranking — = Not ranked т = Tied with team above or below ( ) = First-place votes
	Week							
Poll	1	2	3	4	5	6	7	Final
AP	—	—	—	—	—	—	—	19т (1)
