= 1942 Cornell Big Red football team =

American college football season

1942 Cornell Big Red football
- Conference: Independent
- Record: 3–5–1
- Head coach: Carl Snavely (7th season)
- Captain: Roy Johnson
- Home stadium: Schoellkopf Field

1942 Eastern college football independents records
| | Conf. | | | Overall |
| Team | W | L | T | W | | L | | T |
|---|---|---|---|---|---|---|---|---|
| Williams | | – | | 7 | – | 1 | – | 0 |
| No. 19 Penn State | | – | | 6 | – | 1 | – | 1 |
| No. 8 Boston College | | – | | 8 | – | 2 | – | 0 |
| Buffalo | | – | | 6 | – | 2 | – | 0 |
| Bucknell | | – | | 6 | – | 2 | – | 1 |
| Colgate | | – | | 6 | – | 2 | – | 1 |
| Army | | – | | 6 | – | 3 | – | 0 |
| Syracuse | | – | | 6 | – | 3 | – | 0 |
| Duquesne | | – | | 6 | – | 3 | – | 1 |
| Yale | | – | | 5 | – | 3 | – | 0 |
| Fordham | | – | | 5 | – | 3 | – | 1 |
| Penn | | – | | 5 | – | 3 | – | 1 |
| No. T–19 Holy Cross | | – | | 5 | – | 4 | – | 1 |
| Dartmouth | | – | | 5 | – | 4 | – | 0 |
| Brown | | – | | 4 | – | 4 | – | 0 |
| Villanova | | – | | 4 | – | 4 | – | 0 |
| Vermont | | – | | 4 | – | 3 | – | 0 |
| Carnegie Tech | | – | | 3 | – | 3 | – | 0 |
| Boston University | | – | | 4 | – | 5 | – | 0 |
| Cornell | | – | | 3 | – | 5 | – | 1 |
| Princeton | | – | | 3 | – | 5 | – | 1 |
| Temple | | – | | 2 | – | 5 | – | 3 |
| Columbia | | – | | 3 | – | 6 | – | 0 |
| Pittsburgh | | – | | 3 | – | 6 | – | 0 |
| Tufts | | – | | 2 | – | 5 | – | 1 |
| Franklin & Marshall | | – | | 1 | – | 4 | – | 2 |
| Massachusetts State | | – | | 2 | – | 5 | – | 0 |
| Harvard | | – | | 2 | – | 6 | – | 1 |
| Manhattan | | – | | 2 | – | 6 | – | 0 |
| CCNY | | – | | 1 | – | 7 | – | 1 |
Rankings from AP Poll

The 1942 Cornell Big Red football team was an American football team that represented Cornell University as an independent during the 1942 college football season. In its seventh season under head coach Carl Snavely, the team compiled a 3–5–1 record and was outscored 148-95 by its opponents. The team captain was Roy Johnson.

Cornell was ranked at No. 86 (out of 590 college and military teams) in the final rankings under the Litkenhous Difference by Score System for 1942.

Cornell played its home games at Schoellkopf Field in Ithaca, New York.

== Schedule ==
| Date | Opponent | Site | Result | Attendance | Source |
|---|---|---|---|---|---|
| September 26 | Lafayette | Schoellkopf Field; Ithaca, NY | W 20–16 | 5,000 | |
| October 3 | Colgate | Schoellkopf Field; Ithaca, NY (rivalry) | L 6–18 | 12,000 | |
| October 10 | at Army | Michie Stadium; West Point, NY | L 8–28 | 12,000 | |
| October 17 | Penn State | Schoellkopf Field; Ithaca, NY | T 0–0 | 5,000 | |
| October 24 | at No. 20 Syracuse | Archbold Stadium; Syracuse, NY | L 7–12 | 15,000 | |
| October 31 | at Columbia | Baker Field; New York, NY (rivalry) | L 13–14 | 21,000 | |
| November 7 | at Yale | Yale Bowl; New Haven, CT | W 13–7 | 21,000 | |
| November 14 | vs. Dartmouth | Civic Stadium; Buffalo, NY (rivalry) | W 21–19 | 13,000 | |
| November 26 | at Penn | Franklin Field; Philadelphia, PA (rivalry) | L 7–34 | 62,000 | |
Rankings from AP Poll released prior to the game
