= 1942 Colgate Red Raiders football team =

American college football season

1942 Colgate Red Raiders football
- Conference: Independent
- Record: 6–2–1
- Head coach: Andrew Kerr (14th season)
- Captain: Warren Anderson
- Home stadium: Colgate Athletic Field

1942 Eastern college football independents records
	Conf.			Overall
Team	W	L	T	W		L		T
Williams		–		7	–	1	–	0
No. 19 Penn State		–		6	–	1	–	1
No. 8 Boston College		–		8	–	2	–	0
Buffalo		–		6	–	2	–	0
Bucknell		–		6	–	2	–	1
Colgate		–		6	–	2	–	1
Army		–		6	–	3	–	0
Syracuse		–		6	–	3	–	0
Duquesne		–		6	–	3	–	1
Yale		–		5	–	3	–	0
Fordham		–		5	–	3	–	1
Penn		–		5	–	3	–	1
No. T–19 Holy Cross		–		5	–	4	–	1
Dartmouth		–		5	–	4	–	0
Brown		–		4	–	4	–	0
Villanova		–		4	–	4	–	0
Vermont		–		4	–	3	–	0
Carnegie Tech		–		3	–	3	–	0
Boston University		–		4	–	5	–	0
Cornell		–		3	–	5	–	1
Princeton		–		3	–	5	–	1
Temple		–		2	–	5	–	3
Columbia		–		3	–	6	–	0
Pittsburgh		–		3	–	6	–	0
Tufts		–		2	–	5	–	1
Franklin & Marshall		–		1	–	4	–	2
Massachusetts State		–		2	–	5	–	0
Harvard		–		2	–	6	–	1
Manhattan		–		2	–	6	–	0
CCNY		–		1	–	7	–	1
Rankings from AP Poll

The 1942 Colgate Red Raiders football team was an American football team that represented Colgate University as an independent during the 1942 college football season. In its 14th season under head coach Andrew Kerr, the team compiled a 6–2–1 record and outscored opponents by a total of 172 to 104. Warren Anderson was the team captain.

Colgate was ranked at No. 59 (out of 590 college and military teams) in the final rankings under the Litkenhous Difference by Score System for 1942.

The team played its home games at Colgate Athletic Field in Hamilton, New York.

== Schedule ==
Date	Opponent	Rank	Site	Result	Attendance	Source
September 26	St. Lawrence		Colgate Athletic Field; Hamilton, NY	W 49–0		
October 3	at Cornell		Schoellkopf Field; Ithaca, NY (rivalry)	W 18–6	12,000	
October 10	at Dartmouth		Memorial Field; Hanover, NH	W 27–19	10,000	
October 17	vs. Duke	No. 9	Civic Stadium; Buffalo, NY	L 0–34	18,782	
October 24	at Penn State		New Beaver Field; State College, PA	L 10–13	11,510	
October 31	at Holy Cross		Fitton Field; Worcester, MA	T 6–6		
November 7	at Columbia		Baker Field; New York, NY	W 35–26	15,000	
November 14	at Syracuse		Archbold Stadium; Syracuse, NY (rivalry)	W 14–0	25,000	
November 21	at Brown		Andrews Field; Providence, RI	W 13–0	8,000	
Rankings from AP Poll released prior to the game

== Rankings ==
Ranking movements Legend: ██ Increase in ranking ██ Decrease in ranking — = Not ranked ( ) = First-place votes
	Week							
Poll	1	2	3	4	5	6	7	Final
AP	9 (2)	—	—	—	—	—	—	—
