= 1942 Harvard Crimson football team =

American college football season

1942 Harvard Crimson football
- Conference: Independent
- Record: 2–6–1
- Head coach: Dick Harlow (8th season)
- Home stadium: Harvard Stadium

1942 Eastern college football independents records
	Conf.			Overall
Team	W	L	T	W		L		T
Williams		–		7	–	1	–	0
No. 19 Penn State		–		6	–	1	–	1
No. 8 Boston College		–		8	–	2	–	0
Buffalo		–		6	–	2	–	0
Bucknell		–		6	–	2	–	1
Colgate		–		6	–	2	–	1
Army		–		6	–	3	–	0
Syracuse		–		6	–	3	–	0
Duquesne		–		6	–	3	–	1
Yale		–		5	–	3	–	0
Fordham		–		5	–	3	–	1
Penn		–		5	–	3	–	1
No. T–19 Holy Cross		–		5	–	4	–	1
Dartmouth		–		5	–	4	–	0
Brown		–		4	–	4	–	0
Villanova		–		4	–	4	–	0
Vermont		–		4	–	3	–	0
Carnegie Tech		–		3	–	3	–	0
Boston University		–		4	–	5	–	0
Cornell		–		3	–	5	–	1
Princeton		–		3	–	5	–	1
Temple		–		2	–	5	–	3
Columbia		–		3	–	6	–	0
Pittsburgh		–		3	–	6	–	0
Tufts		–		2	–	5	–	1
Franklin & Marshall		–		1	–	4	–	2
Massachusetts State		–		2	–	5	–	0
Harvard		–		2	–	6	–	1
Manhattan		–		2	–	6	–	0
CCNY		–		1	–	7	–	1
Rankings from AP Poll

The 1942 Harvard Crimson football team was an American football team that represented Harvard University during the 1942 college football season. In its eighth season under head coach Dick Harlow, the team compiled a 2–6–1 record and was outscored 123-52 by opponents.

Harvard was ranked at No. 64 (out of 590 college and military teams) in the final rankings under the Litkenhous Difference by Score System for 1942.

Harvard played its home games at Harvard Stadium in the Allston neighborhood of Boston.

== Schedule ==
Date	Opponent	Site	Result	Attendance	Source
September 26	North Carolina Pre-Flight	Harvard Stadium; Boston, MA	L 0–13	12,000	
October 3	Penn	Harvard Stadium; Boston, MA (rivalry)	L 7–19	20,000	
October 10	William & Mary	Harvard Stadium; Boston, MA	T 7–7	10,000	
October 17	Dartmouth	Harvard Stadium; Boston, MA (rivalry)	L 2–14	26,000	
October 24	No. 11 Army	Harvard Stadium; Boston, MA	L 0–14	35,000	
October 31	Princeton	Harvard Stadium; Boston, MA (rivalry)	W 19–14	20,000	
November 7	at No. 11 Michigan	Michigan Stadium; Ann Arbor, MI	L 7–35	25,534	
November 14	Brown	Harvard Stadium; Boston, MA	W 7–0	9,000	
November 21	at Yale	Yale Bowl; New Haven, CT (The Game)	L 3–7	24,000	
Rankings from AP Poll released prior to the game
