= 1942 Penn Quakers football team =

American college football season

1942 Penn Quakers football
- Conference: Independent
- Record: 5–3–1
- Head coach: George Munger (5th season)
- Home stadium: Franklin Field

1942 Eastern college football independents records
| | Conf. | | | Overall |
| Team | W | L | T | W | | L | | T |
|---|---|---|---|---|---|---|---|---|
| Williams | | – | | 7 | – | 1 | – | 0 |
| No. 19 Penn State | | – | | 6 | – | 1 | – | 1 |
| No. 8 Boston College | | – | | 8 | – | 2 | – | 0 |
| Buffalo | | – | | 6 | – | 2 | – | 0 |
| Bucknell | | – | | 6 | – | 2 | – | 1 |
| Colgate | | – | | 6 | – | 2 | – | 1 |
| Army | | – | | 6 | – | 3 | – | 0 |
| Syracuse | | – | | 6 | – | 3 | – | 0 |
| Duquesne | | – | | 6 | – | 3 | – | 1 |
| Yale | | – | | 5 | – | 3 | – | 0 |
| Fordham | | – | | 5 | – | 3 | – | 1 |
| Penn | | – | | 5 | – | 3 | – | 1 |
| No. T–19 Holy Cross | | – | | 5 | – | 4 | – | 1 |
| Dartmouth | | – | | 5 | – | 4 | – | 0 |
| Brown | | – | | 4 | – | 4 | – | 0 |
| Villanova | | – | | 4 | – | 4 | – | 0 |
| Vermont | | – | | 4 | – | 3 | – | 0 |
| Carnegie Tech | | – | | 3 | – | 3 | – | 0 |
| Boston University | | – | | 4 | – | 5 | – | 0 |
| Cornell | | – | | 3 | – | 5 | – | 1 |
| Princeton | | – | | 3 | – | 5 | – | 1 |
| Temple | | – | | 2 | – | 5 | – | 3 |
| Columbia | | – | | 3 | – | 6 | – | 0 |
| Pittsburgh | | – | | 3 | – | 6 | – | 0 |
| Tufts | | – | | 2 | – | 5 | – | 1 |
| Franklin & Marshall | | – | | 1 | – | 4 | – | 2 |
| Massachusetts State | | – | | 2 | – | 5 | – | 0 |
| Harvard | | – | | 2 | – | 6 | – | 1 |
| Manhattan | | – | | 2 | – | 6 | – | 0 |
| CCNY | | – | | 1 | – | 7 | – | 1 |
Rankings from AP Poll

The 1942 Penn Quakers football team was an American football team that represented the University of Pennsylvania as an independent during the 1942 college football season. In its fifth season under head coach George Munger, the team compiled a 5–3–1 record and outscored opponents by a total of 168 to 72.

Penn was ranked at No. 22 (out of 590 college and military teams) in the final rankings under the Litkenhous Difference by Score System for 1942.

The team played its home games at Franklin Field in Philadelphia.

== Schedule ==
| Date | Opponent | Rank | Site | Result | Attendance | Source |
|---|---|---|---|---|---|---|
| September 26 | Georgia Pre-Flight | | Franklin Field; Philadelphia, PA | L 6–14 | 30,000 | |
| October 3 | at Harvard | | Harvard Stadium; Boston, MA (rivalry) | W 19–7 | 20,000 | |
| October 10 | at Yale | | Yale Bowl; New Haven, CT | W 35–6 | | |
| October 17 | Princeton | No. 8 | Franklin Field; Philadelphia, PA (rivalry) | T 6–6 | 35,000 | |
| October 24 | Columbia | No. 17 | Franklin Field; Philadelphia, PA | W 42–12 | 45,000 | |
| October 31 | No. 8 Army | No. 14 | Franklin Field; Philadelphia, PA | W 19–0 | | |
| November 7 | Navy | No. 9 | Franklin Field; Philadelphia, PA | L 0–7 | | |
| November 14 | Penn State | No. 17 | Franklin Field; Philadelphia, PA | L 7–13 | 50,000 | |
| November 26 | Cornell | | Franklin Field; Philadelphia, PA (rivalry) | W 34–7 | 62,000 | |
Rankings from AP Poll released prior to the game

== Rankings ==
Ranking movements Legend: ██ Increase in ranking ██ Decrease in ranking — = Not ranked т = Tied with team above or below ( ) = First-place votes
| | Week | | | | | | | |
| Poll | 1 | 2 | 3 | 4 | 5 | 6 | 7 | Final |
|---|---|---|---|---|---|---|---|---|
| AP | 8 (5) | 17т | 14 | 9 (1) | 17 | — | — | — |
