= 1942 Vermont Catamounts football team =

American college football season

1942 Vermont Catamounts football
- Conference: Independent
- Record: 4–3
- Head coach: John C. Evans (3rd season)
- Home stadium: Centennial Field

1942 Eastern college football independents records
	Conf.			Overall
Team	W	L	T	W		L		T
Williams		–		7	–	1	–	0
No. 19 Penn State		–		6	–	1	–	1
No. 8 Boston College		–		8	–	2	–	0
Buffalo		–		6	–	2	–	0
Bucknell		–		6	–	2	–	1
Colgate		–		6	–	2	–	1
Army		–		6	–	3	–	0
Syracuse		–		6	–	3	–	0
Duquesne		–		6	–	3	–	1
Yale		–		5	–	3	–	0
Fordham		–		5	–	3	–	1
Penn		–		5	–	3	–	1
No. T–19 Holy Cross		–		5	–	4	–	1
Dartmouth		–		5	–	4	–	0
Brown		–		4	–	4	–	0
Villanova		–		4	–	4	–	0
Vermont		–		4	–	3	–	0
Carnegie Tech		–		3	–	3	–	0
Boston University		–		4	–	5	–	0
Cornell		–		3	–	5	–	1
Princeton		–		3	–	5	–	1
Temple		–		2	–	5	–	3
Columbia		–		3	–	6	–	0
Pittsburgh		–		3	–	6	–	0
Tufts		–		2	–	5	–	1
Franklin & Marshall		–		1	–	4	–	2
Massachusetts State		–		2	–	5	–	0
Harvard		–		2	–	6	–	1
Manhattan		–		2	–	6	–	0
CCNY		–		1	–	7	–	1
Rankings from AP Poll

The 1942 Vermont Catamounts football team was an American football team that represented the University of Vermont as an independent during the 1942 college football season. In their third year under head coach John C. Evans, the team compiled a 4–3 record.

Vermont was ranked at No. 417 (out of 590 college and military teams) in the final rankings under the Litkenhous Difference by Score System for 1942.

== Schedule ==
Date	Opponent	Site	Result	Attendance	Source
September 26	Rhode Island State	Centennial Field; Burlington, VT	L 13–70		
October 3	at Rutgers	Rutgers Stadium; Piscataway, NJ	L 20–27	3,000	
October 10	Massachusetts State	Centennial Field; Burlington, VT	W 13–6		
October 17	at Union (NY)	Alexander Field; Schenectady, NY	L 12–26		
October 31	at Trinity (CT)	Trinity Field; Hartford, CT	W 21–14		
November 7	Norwich	Centennial Field; Burlington, VT	W 14–10		
November 14	at Middlebury	Porter Field; Middlebury, VT	W 18–7		
