= 1942 Bucknell Bison football team =

American college football season

1942 Bucknell Bison football
- Conference: Independent
- Record: 6–2–1
- Head coach: Al Humphreys (6th season)
- Home stadium: Memorial Stadium

1942 Eastern college football independents records
	Conf.			Overall
Team	W	L	T	W		L		T
Williams		–		7	–	1	–	0
No. 19 Penn State		–		6	–	1	–	1
No. 8 Boston College		–		8	–	2	–	0
Buffalo		–		6	–	2	–	0
Bucknell		–		6	–	2	–	1
Colgate		–		6	–	2	–	1
Army		–		6	–	3	–	0
Syracuse		–		6	–	3	–	0
Duquesne		–		6	–	3	–	1
Yale		–		5	–	3	–	0
Fordham		–		5	–	3	–	1
Penn		–		5	–	3	–	1
No. T–19 Holy Cross		–		5	–	4	–	1
Dartmouth		–		5	–	4	–	0
Brown		–		4	–	4	–	0
Villanova		–		4	–	4	–	0
Vermont		–		4	–	3	–	0
Carnegie Tech		–		3	–	3	–	0
Boston University		–		4	–	5	–	0
Cornell		–		3	–	5	–	1
Princeton		–		3	–	5	–	1
Temple		–		2	–	5	–	3
Columbia		–		3	–	6	–	0
Pittsburgh		–		3	–	6	–	0
Tufts		–		2	–	5	–	1
Franklin & Marshall		–		1	–	4	–	2
Massachusetts State		–		2	–	5	–	0
Harvard		–		2	–	6	–	1
Manhattan		–		2	–	6	–	0
CCNY		–		1	–	7	–	1
Rankings from AP Poll

The 1942 Bucknell Bison football team was an American football team that represented Bucknell University as an independent during the 1942 college football season. In its sixth season under head coach Al Humphreys, the team compiled a 6–2–1 record.

Bucknell was ranked at No. 124 (out of 590 college and military teams) in the final rankings under the Litkenhous Difference by Score System for 1942.

The team played its home games at Memorial Stadium in Lewisburg, Pennsylvania.

== Schedule ==
Date	Opponent	Site	Result	Attendance	Source
September 26	Lebanon Valley	Memorial Stadium; Lewisburg, PA	W 7–0		
October 3	at Penn State	New Beaver Field; State College, PA	L 7–14	10,303	
October 9	at Temple	Temple Stadium; Philadelphia, PA	T 7–7		
October 17	at Rutgers	Rutgers Stadium; Piscataway, NJ	L 7–9		
October 24	at Boston University	Nickerson Field; Weston, MA	W 13–7		
October 31	Lafayette^{†}	Memorial Stadium; Lewisburg, PA	W 13–7	7,000	
November 7	Gettysburg	Memorial Stadium; Lewisburg, PA	W 7–6		
November 13	at Case	Shaw Stadium; East Cleveland, OH	W 21–6		
November 26	at Franklin & Marshall	Williamson Field; Lancaster, PA	W 27–0	8,000	
^{†}Homecoming
