= 1942 Williams Ephs football team =

American college football season

1942 Williams Ephs football
- Conference: Independent
- Record: 7–1
- Head coach: Charlie Caldwell (15th season)
- Home stadium: Weston Field

1942 Eastern college football independents records
| | Conf. | | | Overall |
| Team | W | L | T | W | | L | | T |
|---|---|---|---|---|---|---|---|---|
| Williams | | – | | 7 | – | 1 | – | 0 |
| No. 19 Penn State | | – | | 6 | – | 1 | – | 1 |
| No. 8 Boston College | | – | | 8 | – | 2 | – | 0 |
| Buffalo | | – | | 6 | – | 2 | – | 0 |
| Bucknell | | – | | 6 | – | 2 | – | 1 |
| Colgate | | – | | 6 | – | 2 | – | 1 |
| Army | | – | | 6 | – | 3 | – | 0 |
| Syracuse | | – | | 6 | – | 3 | – | 0 |
| Duquesne | | – | | 6 | – | 3 | – | 1 |
| Yale | | – | | 5 | – | 3 | – | 0 |
| Fordham | | – | | 5 | – | 3 | – | 1 |
| Penn | | – | | 5 | – | 3 | – | 1 |
| No. T–19 Holy Cross | | – | | 5 | – | 4 | – | 1 |
| Dartmouth | | – | | 5 | – | 4 | – | 0 |
| Brown | | – | | 4 | – | 4 | – | 0 |
| Villanova | | – | | 4 | – | 4 | – | 0 |
| Vermont | | – | | 4 | – | 3 | – | 0 |
| Carnegie Tech | | – | | 3 | – | 3 | – | 0 |
| Boston University | | – | | 4 | – | 5 | – | 0 |
| Cornell | | – | | 3 | – | 5 | – | 1 |
| Princeton | | – | | 3 | – | 5 | – | 1 |
| Temple | | – | | 2 | – | 5 | – | 3 |
| Columbia | | – | | 3 | – | 6 | – | 0 |
| Pittsburgh | | – | | 3 | – | 6 | – | 0 |
| Tufts | | – | | 2 | – | 5 | – | 1 |
| Franklin & Marshall | | – | | 1 | – | 4 | – | 2 |
| Massachusetts State | | – | | 2 | – | 5 | – | 0 |
| Harvard | | – | | 2 | – | 6 | – | 1 |
| Manhattan | | – | | 2 | – | 6 | – | 0 |
| CCNY | | – | | 1 | – | 7 | – | 1 |
Rankings from AP Poll

The 1942 Williams Ephs football team represented the Williams College as an independent during the 1942 college football season. In Charlie Caldwell's 15th and final year at Williams, the Ephs compiled a 7–1 record, shutting out three teams, and outscored opponents 256 to 46. After winning their first seven contests, the Ephs made a quick appearance on the AP Poll for the first and only time in program history. Williams lost the last game of the season against rival Amherst and fell from the rankings.

Williams was ranked at No. 95 (out of 590 college and military teams) in the final rankings under the Litkenhous Difference by Score System for 1942.

== Schedule ==
| Date | Opponent | Rank | Site | Result | Source |
|---|---|---|---|---|---|
| September 26 | Middlebury | | Weston Field; Williamstown, MA | W 41–0 | |
| October 3 | at Princeton | | Palmer Stadium; Princeton, NJ | W 19–7 | |
| October 10 | Clarkson | | Weston Field; Williamstown, MA | W 52–0 | |
| October 17 | at Bowdoin | | Whittier Field; Brunswick, ME | W 19–0 | |
| October 24 | Tufts | | Weston Field; Williamstown, MA | W 47–6 | |
| October 31 | at Union (NY) | | Alexander Field; Schenectady, NY | W 41–15 | |
| November 7 | Wesleyan | | Weston Field; Williamstown, MA | W 31–6 | |
| November 14 | at Amherst | No. 20 | Pratt Field; Amherst, MA (rivalry) | L 6–12 | |
Rankings from AP Poll released prior to the game

== Rankings ==
Ranking movements Legend: ██ Increase in ranking ██ Decrease in ranking — = Not ranked
| | Week | | | | | | | |
| Poll | 1 | 2 | 3 | 4 | 5 | 6 | 7 | Final |
|---|---|---|---|---|---|---|---|---|
| AP | — | — | — | — | 20 | — | — | — |
