= 1942 Villanova Wildcats football team =

American college football season

1942 Villanova Wildcats football
- Conference: Independent
- Record: 4–4
- Head coach: Clipper Smith (7th season)
- Home stadium: Shibe Park, Villanova Stadium

1942 Eastern college football independents records
	Conf.			Overall
Team	W	L	T	W		L		T
Williams		–		7	–	1	–	0
No. 19 Penn State		–		6	–	1	–	1
No. 8 Boston College		–		8	–	2	–	0
Buffalo		–		6	–	2	–	0
Bucknell		–		6	–	2	–	1
Colgate		–		6	–	2	–	1
Army		–		6	–	3	–	0
Syracuse		–		6	–	3	–	0
Duquesne		–		6	–	3	–	1
Yale		–		5	–	3	–	0
Fordham		–		5	–	3	–	1
Penn		–		5	–	3	–	1
No. T–19 Holy Cross		–		5	–	4	–	1
Dartmouth		–		5	–	4	–	0
Brown		–		4	–	4	–	0
Villanova		–		4	–	4	–	0
Vermont		–		4	–	3	–	0
Carnegie Tech		–		3	–	3	–	0
Boston University		–		4	–	5	–	0
Cornell		–		3	–	5	–	1
Princeton		–		3	–	5	–	1
Temple		–		2	–	5	–	3
Columbia		–		3	–	6	–	0
Pittsburgh		–		3	–	6	–	0
Tufts		–		2	–	5	–	1
Franklin & Marshall		–		1	–	4	–	2
Massachusetts State		–		2	–	5	–	0
Harvard		–		2	–	6	–	1
Manhattan		–		2	–	6	–	0
CCNY		–		1	–	7	–	1
Rankings from AP Poll

The 1942 Villanova Wildcats football team represented the Villanova University during the 1942 college football season. The head coach was Clipper Smith, coaching his seventh season with the Wildcats. The team played their home games at Villanova Stadium in Villanova, Pennsylvania.

Villanova was ranked at No. 61 (out of 590 college and military teams) in the final rankings under the Litkenhous Difference by Score System for 1942.

== Schedule ==
Date	Opponent	Site	Result	Attendance	Source
October 10	Manhattan Beach Coast Guard	Shibe Park; Philadelphia, PA	L 13–20	18,000	
October 17	Florida	Shibe Park; Philadelphia, PA	W 13–3	8,051	
October 23	at Auburn	Cramton Bowl; Montgomery, AL	L 6–14	10,000	
November 1	Manhattan	Shibe Park; Philadelphia, PA	W 32–0		
November 6	Iowa State	Shibe Park; Philadelphia, PA	W 32–7	8,827	
November 15	at Detroit	University of Detroit Stadium; Detroit, MI	L 0–9	11,755	
November 21	Duquesne	Villanova Stadium; Villanova, PA	L 0–6		
November 28	at Temple	Temple Stadium; Philadelphia, PA	W 20–7		
