= Earl Walsh =

American football player and coach (1899–1961)

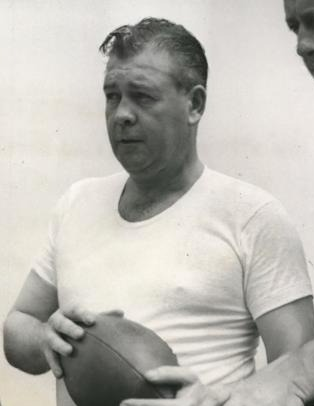
- Walsh in 1942

Biographical details
- Born: June 3, 1899; Adair, Iowa, U.S.
- Died: June 21, 1961 (aged 62); Chicago, Illinois, U.S.
- Education: University of Notre Dame (1922)

Playing career
- 1919–1921: Notre Dame
- Position: Left halfback

Coaching career (HC unless noted)
- 1933–1941: Fordham (backfield)
- 1942: Fordham

Head coaching record
- Overall: 5–3–1

Earl Francis Walsh (June 3, 1899 – June 21, 1961) was an American football player and coach. He served the head football coach at Fordham University in 1942, compiling a record of 5–3–1. From 1933 to 1941, Walsh was the backfield coach at Fordham under head coach Jim Crowley, a fellow alumnus of the University of Notre Dame. Walsh previously coached at Dowling College and at the Catholic Academy in Des Moines, Iowa. He died at a Chicago hospital in 1961.

== Head coaching record ==
Year	Team	Overall	Conference	Standing	Bowl/playoffs
Fordham Rams (Independent) (1942)
1942	Fordham	5–3–1			
Fordham:		5–3–1			
Total:		5–3–1			
