= 1942 Yale Bulldogs football team =

American college football season

1942 Yale Bulldogs football
- Conference: Independent
- Record: 5–3
- Head coach: Howie Odell (1st season)
- Captain: Spencer Moseley
- Home stadium: Yale Bowl

1942 Eastern college football independents records
	Conf.			Overall
Team	W	L	T	W		L		T
Williams		–		7	–	1	–	0
No. 19 Penn State		–		6	–	1	–	1
No. 8 Boston College		–		8	–	2	–	0
Buffalo		–		6	–	2	–	0
Bucknell		–		6	–	2	–	1
Colgate		–		6	–	2	–	1
Army		–		6	–	3	–	0
Syracuse		–		6	–	3	–	0
Duquesne		–		6	–	3	–	1
Yale		–		5	–	3	–	0
Fordham		–		5	–	3	–	1
Penn		–		5	–	3	–	1
No. T–19 Holy Cross		–		5	–	4	–	1
Dartmouth		–		5	–	4	–	0
Brown		–		4	–	4	–	0
Villanova		–		4	–	4	–	0
Vermont		–		4	–	3	–	0
Carnegie Tech		–		3	–	3	–	0
Boston University		–		4	–	5	–	0
Cornell		–		3	–	5	–	1
Princeton		–		3	–	5	–	1
Temple		–		2	–	5	–	3
Columbia		–		3	–	6	–	0
Pittsburgh		–		3	–	6	–	0
Tufts		–		2	–	5	–	1
Franklin & Marshall		–		1	–	4	–	2
Massachusetts State		–		2	–	5	–	0
Harvard		–		2	–	6	–	1
Manhattan		–		2	–	6	–	0
CCNY		–		1	–	7	–	1
Rankings from AP Poll

The 1942 Yale Bulldogs football team represented Yale University in the 1942 college football season. The Bulldogs were led by first-year head coach Howie Odell, played their home games at the Yale Bowl and finished the season with a 5–3 record.

Yale was ranked at No. 54 (out of 590 college and military teams) in the final rankings under the Litkenhous Difference by Score System for 1942.

== Schedule ==
Date	Opponent	Site	Result	Attendance	Source
October 3	Lehigh	Yale Bowl; New Haven, CT	W 33–6		
October 12	Penn	Yale Bowl; New Haven, CT	L 6–35		
October 17	at Navy	Municipal Stadium; Baltimore, MD	L 6–13		
October 24	Dartmouth	Yale Bowl; New Haven, CT	W 17–7		
October 31	Brown	Yale Bowl; New Haven, CT	W 27–0		
November 7	Cornell	Yale Bowl; New Haven, CT	L 7–13		
November 14	vs. Princeton	Baker Field; New York, NY (rivalry)	W 13–6	32,000	
November 21	Harvard	Yale Bowl; New Haven, CT (rivalry)	W 7–3		
