= 1942 Princeton Tigers football team =

American college football season

1942 Princeton Tigers football
- Conference: Independent
- Record: 3–5–1
- Head coach: Tad Wieman (5th season)
- Captain: Dick Schmon
- Home stadium: Palmer Stadium

1942 Eastern college football independents records
	Conf.			Overall
Team	W	L	T	W		L		T
Williams		–		7	–	1	–	0
No. 19 Penn State		–		6	–	1	–	1
No. 8 Boston College		–		8	–	2	–	0
Buffalo		–		6	–	2	–	0
Bucknell		–		6	–	2	–	1
Colgate		–		6	–	2	–	1
Army		–		6	–	3	–	0
Syracuse		–		6	–	3	–	0
Duquesne		–		6	–	3	–	1
Yale		–		5	–	3	–	0
Fordham		–		5	–	3	–	1
Penn		–		5	–	3	–	1
No. T–19 Holy Cross		–		5	–	4	–	1
Dartmouth		–		5	–	4	–	0
Brown		–		4	–	4	–	0
Villanova		–		4	–	4	–	0
Vermont		–		4	–	3	–	0
Carnegie Tech		–		3	–	3	–	0
Boston University		–		4	–	5	–	0
Cornell		–		3	–	5	–	1
Princeton		–		3	–	5	–	1
Temple		–		2	–	5	–	3
Columbia		–		3	–	6	–	0
Pittsburgh		–		3	–	6	–	0
Tufts		–		2	–	5	–	1
Franklin & Marshall		–		1	–	4	–	2
Massachusetts State		–		2	–	5	–	0
Harvard		–		2	–	6	–	1
Manhattan		–		2	–	6	–	0
CCNY		–		1	–	7	–	1
Rankings from AP Poll

The 1942 Princeton Tigers football team was an American football team that represented Princeton University as an independent during the 1942 college football season. In its fifth and final season under head coach Tad Wieman, the team compiled a 3–5–1 record and was outscored by a total of 135 to 109. Dick Schmon was Princeton's team captain.

Princeton was ranked at No. 73 (out of 590 college and military teams) in the final rankings under the Litkenhous Difference by Score System for 1942.

Princeton played its 1942 home games at Palmer Stadium in Princeton, New Jersey.

== Schedule ==
Date	Opponent	Site	Result	Attendance	Source
September 26	Lakehurst NAS	Palmer Stadium; Princeton, NJ	W 20–6	6,000	
October 3	Williams	Palmer Stadium; Princeton, NJ	L 7–19	8,000	
October 10	vs. Navy	Yankee Stadium; Bronx, NY	W 10–0	25,000	
October 17	at No. 8 Penn	Franklin Field; Philadelphia, PA (rivalry)	T 6–6	35,000	
October 24	Brown	Palmer Stadium; Princeton, NJ	W 32–13	15,000	
October 31	at Harvard	Harvard Stadium; Boston, MA (rivalry)	L 14–19	20,000	
November 7	Dartmouth	Palmer Stadium; Princeton, NJ	W 7–19	16,000	
November 14	vs. Yale	Baker Field; New York, NY (rivalry)	L 6–13	35,000	
November 21	vs. Army	Yankee Stadium; Bronx, NY	L 7–40	40,000	
Rankings from AP Poll released prior to the game
