= 1942 Temple Owls football team =

American college football season

1942 Temple Owls football
- Conference: Independent
- Record: 2–5–3
- Head coach: Ray Morrison (3rd season)
- Home stadium: Temple Stadium

1942 Eastern college football independents records
	Conf.			Overall
Team	W	L	T	W		L		T
Williams		–		7	–	1	–	0
No. 19 Penn State		–		6	–	1	–	1
No. 8 Boston College		–		8	–	2	–	0
Buffalo		–		6	–	2	–	0
Bucknell		–		6	–	2	–	1
Colgate		–		6	–	2	–	1
Army		–		6	–	3	–	0
Syracuse		–		6	–	3	–	0
Duquesne		–		6	–	3	–	1
Yale		–		5	–	3	–	0
Fordham		–		5	–	3	–	1
Penn		–		5	–	3	–	1
No. T–19 Holy Cross		–		5	–	4	–	1
Dartmouth		–		5	–	4	–	0
Brown		–		4	–	4	–	0
Villanova		–		4	–	4	–	0
Vermont		–		4	–	3	–	0
Carnegie Tech		–		3	–	3	–	0
Boston University		–		4	–	5	–	0
Cornell		–		3	–	5	–	1
Princeton		–		3	–	5	–	1
Temple		–		2	–	5	–	3
Columbia		–		3	–	6	–	0
Pittsburgh		–		3	–	6	–	0
Tufts		–		2	–	5	–	1
Franklin & Marshall		–		1	–	4	–	2
Massachusetts State		–		2	–	5	–	0
Harvard		–		2	–	6	–	1
Manhattan		–		2	–	6	–	0
CCNY		–		1	–	7	–	1
Rankings from AP Poll

The 1942 Temple Owls football team was an American football team that represented Temple University as an independent during the 1942 college football season. In its third season under head coach Ray Morrison, the team compiled a 2–5–3 record and was outscored by a total of 135 to 48.

Temple was ranked at No. 94 (out of 590 college and military teams) in the final rankings under the Litkenhous Difference by Score System for 1942.

The team played its home games at Temple Stadium in Philadelphia.

== Schedule ==
Date	Opponent	Site	Result	Attendance	Source
September 25	Georgetown	Temple Stadium; Philadelphia, PA	L 0–7	22,000	
October 2	VMI	Temple Stadium; Philadelphia, PA	W 7–6	15,000	
October 9	Bucknell	Temple Stadium; Philadelphia, PA	T 7–7		
October 16	at SMU	Cotton Bowl; Dallas, TX	T 6–6		
October 23	North Carolina Pre-Flight	Temple Stadium; Philadelphia, PA	L 0–34	20,000	
October 31	Michigan State	Temple Stadium; Philadelphia, PA	T 7–7		
November 7	at No. 5 Boston College	Fenway Park; Boston, MA	L 0–28	24,000	
November 14	Holy Cross	Temple Stadium; Philadelphia, PA	L 0–13		
November 21	Oklahoma	Temple Stadium; Philadelphia, PA	W 14–7	5,000	
November 28	Villanova	Temple Stadium; Philadelphia, PA	L 7–20		
Rankings from AP Poll released prior to the game
