= 1942 Columbia Lions football team =

American college football season

1942 Columbia Lions football
- Conference: Independent
- Record: 3–6
- Head coach: Lou Little (13th season)
- Captains: Felix Demartini; Paul Governali
- Home stadium: Baker Field

1942 Eastern college football independents records
	Conf.			Overall
Team	W	L	T	W		L		T
Williams		–		7	–	1	–	0
No. 19 Penn State		–		6	–	1	–	1
No. 8 Boston College		–		8	–	2	–	0
Buffalo		–		6	–	2	–	0
Bucknell		–		6	–	2	–	1
Colgate		–		6	–	2	–	1
Army		–		6	–	3	–	0
Syracuse		–		6	–	3	–	0
Duquesne		–		6	–	3	–	1
Yale		–		5	–	3	–	0
Fordham		–		5	–	3	–	1
Penn		–		5	–	3	–	1
No. T–19 Holy Cross		–		5	–	4	–	1
Dartmouth		–		5	–	4	–	0
Brown		–		4	–	4	–	0
Villanova		–		4	–	4	–	0
Vermont		–		4	–	3	–	0
Carnegie Tech		–		3	–	3	–	0
Boston University		–		4	–	5	–	0
Cornell		–		3	–	5	–	1
Princeton		–		3	–	5	–	1
Temple		–		2	–	5	–	3
Columbia		–		3	–	6	–	0
Pittsburgh		–		3	–	6	–	0
Tufts		–		2	–	5	–	1
Franklin & Marshall		–		1	–	4	–	2
Massachusetts State		–		2	–	5	–	0
Harvard		–		2	–	6	–	1
Manhattan		–		2	–	6	–	0
CCNY		–		1	–	7	–	1
Rankings from AP Poll

The 1942 Columbia Lions football team was an American football team that represented Columbia University as an independent during the 1942 college football season. Home games were played in New York City at Baker Field in Upper Manhattan.

Under thirteenth-year head coach Lou Little, the Lions compiled a 3–6 record and were outscored 193 to 169. The team captains were Felix Demartini and Paul Governali.

Ken Germann led the team in scoring, with 60 points (six touchdowns). Governali, the Heisman Trophy runner-up, led in total offense, with 1,610 yards (1,442 passing, 168 rushing).

Columbia was ranked at No. 91 (out of 590 college and military teams) in the final rankings under the Litkenhous Difference by Score System for 1942.

== Schedule ==
Date	Opponent	Site	Result	Attendance	Source
September 26	Fort Monmouth	Baker Field; New York, NY	W 39–0		
October 3	Maine	Baker Field; New York, NY	W 34–2	12,000	
October 10	Brown	Baker Field; New York, NY	L 21–28	17,000	
October 17	No. 18 Army	Baker Field; New York, NY	L 6–34	30,000	
October 24	at No. 17 Penn	Franklin Field; Philadelphia, PA	L 12–42	45,000	
October 31	Cornell	Baker Field; New York, NY (rivalry)	W 14–13	21,000	
November 7	Colgate	Baker Field; New York, NY	L 21–35	15,000	
November 14	at Navy	Memorial Stadium; Baltimore, MD	L 9–13	25,000	
November 21	Dartmouth	Baker Field; New York, NY	L 13–26	10,000	
Rankings from AP Poll released prior to the game
