= 1942 Massachusetts State Aggies football team =

American college football season

1942 Massachusetts State Aggies football
- Conference: Independent
- Record: 2–5
- Head coach: Walter Hargesheimer (2nd season)
- Home stadium: Alumni Field

1942 Eastern college football independents records
	Conf.			Overall
Team	W	L	T	W		L		T
Williams		–		7	–	1	–	0
No. 19 Penn State		–		6	–	1	–	1
No. 8 Boston College		–		8	–	2	–	0
Buffalo		–		6	–	2	–	0
Bucknell		–		6	–	2	–	1
Colgate		–		6	–	2	–	1
Army		–		6	–	3	–	0
Syracuse		–		6	–	3	–	0
Duquesne		–		6	–	3	–	1
Yale		–		5	–	3	–	0
Fordham		–		5	–	3	–	1
Penn		–		5	–	3	–	1
No. T–19 Holy Cross		–		5	–	4	–	1
Dartmouth		–		5	–	4	–	0
Brown		–		4	–	4	–	0
Villanova		–		4	–	4	–	0
Vermont		–		4	–	3	–	0
Carnegie Tech		–		3	–	3	–	0
Boston University		–		4	–	5	–	0
Cornell		–		3	–	5	–	1
Princeton		–		3	–	5	–	1
Temple		–		2	–	5	–	3
Columbia		–		3	–	6	–	0
Pittsburgh		–		3	–	6	–	0
Tufts		–		2	–	5	–	1
Franklin & Marshall		–		1	–	4	–	2
Massachusetts State		–		2	–	5	–	0
Harvard		–		2	–	6	–	1
Manhattan		–		2	–	6	–	0
CCNY		–		1	–	7	–	1
Rankings from AP Poll

The 1942 Massachusetts State Aggies football team represented Massachusetts State College in the 1942 college football season. The team was coached by Walter Hargesheimer. Mass State finished the season with a record of 2–5.

Massachusetts State was ranked at No. 458 (out of 590 college and military teams) in the final rankings under the Litkenhous Difference by Score System for 1942.

The team played its home games at Alumni Field in Amherst, Massachusetts. The 1942 season was the team's last before disbanding during World War II.

== Schedule ==
Date	Opponent	Site	Result	Source
October 3	at Connecticut	Gardner Dow Athletic Fields; Storrs, CT (rivalry)	L 0–26	
October 10	at Vermont	Centennial Field; Burlington, VT	L 6–13	
October 17	Rhode Island State	Alumni Field; Amherst, MA	L 6–21	
October 24	Worcester Tech	Alumni Field; Amherst, MA	W 18–6	
October 31	at Amherst	Pratt Field; Amherst, MA	L 0–43	
November 7	Clarkson	Alumni Field; Amherst, MA	W 13–9	
November 14	at Tufts	Tufts Oval; Somerville, MA	L 0–7	
