= 1942 Buffalo Bulls football team =

American college football season

1942 Buffalo Bulls football
- Conference: Independent
- Record: 6–2
- Head coach: Jim Peele (7th season)
- Captain: Sid Snyder
- Home stadium: Civic Stadium

1942 Eastern college football independents records
	Conf.			Overall
Team	W	L	T	W		L		T
Williams		–		7	–	1	–	0
No. 19 Penn State		–		6	–	1	–	1
No. 8 Boston College		–		8	–	2	–	0
Buffalo		–		6	–	2	–	0
Bucknell		–		6	–	2	–	1
Colgate		–		6	–	2	–	1
Army		–		6	–	3	–	0
Syracuse		–		6	–	3	–	0
Duquesne		–		6	–	3	–	1
Yale		–		5	–	3	–	0
Fordham		–		5	–	3	–	1
Penn		–		5	–	3	–	1
No. T–19 Holy Cross		–		5	–	4	–	1
Dartmouth		–		5	–	4	–	0
Brown		–		4	–	4	–	0
Villanova		–		4	–	4	–	0
Vermont		–		4	–	3	–	0
Carnegie Tech		–		3	–	3	–	0
Boston University		–		4	–	5	–	0
Cornell		–		3	–	5	–	1
Princeton		–		3	–	5	–	1
Temple		–		2	–	5	–	3
Columbia		–		3	–	6	–	0
Pittsburgh		–		3	–	6	–	0
Tufts		–		2	–	5	–	1
Franklin & Marshall		–		1	–	4	–	2
Massachusetts State		–		2	–	5	–	0
Harvard		–		2	–	6	–	1
Manhattan		–		2	–	6	–	0
CCNY		–		1	–	7	–	1
Rankings from AP Poll

The 1942 Buffalo Bulls football team was an American football team that represented the University of Buffalo as an independent during the 1942 college football season. In their seventh season under head coach Jim Peele, the Bulls compiled a 6–2 record and outscored opponents by a total of 215 to 52.

Buffalo's triple-threat back Lou Corrierre led the team and finished second among eastern college players with 90 points scored.

Buffalo was ranked at No. 254 (out of 590 college and military teams) in the final rankings under the Litkenhous Difference by Score System for 1942.

The team played its home games at Civic Stadium in Buffalo, New York.

== Schedule ==
Date	Opponent	Site	Result	Attendance	Source
September 25	at Susquehanna	Selinsgrove, PA	W 19–0		
October 2	St. Lawrence	Civic Stadium; Buffalo, NY	W 20–0		
October 9	at Washington & Jefferson	Washington, PA	L 7–13		
October 16	Hartwick	Civic Stadium; Buffalo, NY	W 50–6		
October 23	Carnegie Tech^{†}	Civic Stadium; Buffalo, NY	L 14–27	4,672	
October 31	at Johns Hopkins	Homewood Field; Baltimore, MD	W 26–6		
November 7	Hobart	Civic Stadium; Buffalo, NY	W 66–0		
November 14	at RPI	Troy, NY	W 13–0		
^{†}Homecoming
