= 1942 Syracuse Orangemen football team =

American college football season

1942 Syracuse Orangemen football
- Conference: Independent
- Record: 6–3
- Head coach: Ossie Solem (6th season)
- Captain: Richard Weber
- Home stadium: Archbold Stadium

1942 Eastern college football independents records
| | Conf. | | | Overall |
| Team | W | L | T | W | | L | | T |
|---|---|---|---|---|---|---|---|---|
| Williams | | – | | 7 | – | 1 | – | 0 |
| No. 19 Penn State | | – | | 6 | – | 1 | – | 1 |
| No. 8 Boston College | | – | | 8 | – | 2 | – | 0 |
| Buffalo | | – | | 6 | – | 2 | – | 0 |
| Bucknell | | – | | 6 | – | 2 | – | 1 |
| Colgate | | – | | 6 | – | 2 | – | 1 |
| Army | | – | | 6 | – | 3 | – | 0 |
| Syracuse | | – | | 6 | – | 3 | – | 0 |
| Duquesne | | – | | 6 | – | 3 | – | 1 |
| Yale | | – | | 5 | – | 3 | – | 0 |
| Fordham | | – | | 5 | – | 3 | – | 1 |
| Penn | | – | | 5 | – | 3 | – | 1 |
| No. T–19 Holy Cross | | – | | 5 | – | 4 | – | 1 |
| Dartmouth | | – | | 5 | – | 4 | – | 0 |
| Brown | | – | | 4 | – | 4 | – | 0 |
| Villanova | | – | | 4 | – | 4 | – | 0 |
| Vermont | | – | | 4 | – | 3 | – | 0 |
| Carnegie Tech | | – | | 3 | – | 3 | – | 0 |
| Boston University | | – | | 4 | – | 5 | – | 0 |
| Cornell | | – | | 3 | – | 5 | – | 1 |
| Princeton | | – | | 3 | – | 5 | – | 1 |
| Temple | | – | | 2 | – | 5 | – | 3 |
| Columbia | | – | | 3 | – | 6 | – | 0 |
| Pittsburgh | | – | | 3 | – | 6 | – | 0 |
| Tufts | | – | | 2 | – | 5 | – | 1 |
| Franklin & Marshall | | – | | 1 | – | 4 | – | 2 |
| Massachusetts State | | – | | 2 | – | 5 | – | 0 |
| Harvard | | – | | 2 | – | 6 | – | 1 |
| Manhattan | | – | | 2 | – | 6 | – | 0 |
| CCNY | | – | | 1 | – | 7 | – | 1 |
Rankings from AP Poll

The 1942 Syracuse Orangemen football team represented Syracuse University as an independent during the 1942 college football season. The Orangemen were led by sixth-year head coach Ossie Solem.

Syracuse was ranked at No. 72 (out of 590 college and military teams) in the final rankings under the Litkenhous Difference by Score System for 1942.

The team played its home games at Archbold Stadium in Syracuse, New York.

== Schedule ==
| Date | Opponent | Rank | Site | Result | Attendance | Source |
|---|---|---|---|---|---|---|
| September 25 | Clarkson | | Archbold Stadium; Syracuse, NY | W 58–6 | 10,000 | |
| October 3 | Boston University | | Archbold Stadium; Syracuse, NY | W 25–0 | 10,000 | |
| October 9 | Western Reserve | | Archbold Stadium; Syracuse, NY | W 13–0 | 8,000 | |
| October 17 | at Holy Cross | | Fitton Field; Worcester, MA | W 19–0 | 10,000 | |
| October 24 | Cornell | No. 20 | Archbold Stadium; Syracuse, NY | W 12–7 | 15,000 | |
| October 31 | North Carolina Pre-Flight | No. 15 | Archbold Stadium; Syracuse, NY | L 0–9 | 10,000 | |
| November 7 | at Penn State | | New Beaver Field; University Park, PA (rivalry) | L 13–18 | 11,000 | |
| November 14 | Colgate | | Archbold Stadium; Syracuse, NY (rivalry) | L 0–14 | 25,000 | |
| November 21 | at Rutgers | | Rutgers Stadium; Piscataway, NJ | W 12–7 | 5,000 | |
Rankings from AP Poll released prior to the game

== Rankings ==
Ranking movements Legend: ██ Increase in ranking ██ Decrease in ranking — = Not ranked т = Tied with team above or below
| | Week | | | | | | | |
| Poll | 1 | 2 | 3 | 4 | 5 | 6 | 7 | Final |
|---|---|---|---|---|---|---|---|---|
| AP | — | 20 | 15т | — | — | — | — | — |
