= 1942 Boston College Eagles football team =

American college football season

1942 Boston College Eagles football

Eastern champion

Orange Bowl, L 21–37 vs. Alabama
- Conference: Independent

Ranking
- AP: No. 8
- Record: 8–2
- Head coach: Denny Myers (2nd season)
- Captains: Mike Holovak; Fred Naumetz
- Home stadium: Fenway Park

1942 Eastern college football independents records
| | Conf. | | | Overall |
| Team | W | L | T | W | | L | | T |
|---|---|---|---|---|---|---|---|---|
| Williams | | – | | 7 | – | 1 | – | 0 |
| No. 19 Penn State | | – | | 6 | – | 1 | – | 1 |
| No. 8 Boston College | | – | | 8 | – | 2 | – | 0 |
| Buffalo | | – | | 6 | – | 2 | – | 0 |
| Bucknell | | – | | 6 | – | 2 | – | 1 |
| Colgate | | – | | 6 | – | 2 | – | 1 |
| Army | | – | | 6 | – | 3 | – | 0 |
| Syracuse | | – | | 6 | – | 3 | – | 0 |
| Duquesne | | – | | 6 | – | 3 | – | 1 |
| Yale | | – | | 5 | – | 3 | – | 0 |
| Fordham | | – | | 5 | – | 3 | – | 1 |
| Penn | | – | | 5 | – | 3 | – | 1 |
| No. T–19 Holy Cross | | – | | 5 | – | 4 | – | 1 |
| Dartmouth | | – | | 5 | – | 4 | – | 0 |
| Brown | | – | | 4 | – | 4 | – | 0 |
| Villanova | | – | | 4 | – | 4 | – | 0 |
| Vermont | | – | | 4 | – | 3 | – | 0 |
| Carnegie Tech | | – | | 3 | – | 3 | – | 0 |
| Boston University | | – | | 4 | – | 5 | – | 0 |
| Cornell | | – | | 3 | – | 5 | – | 1 |
| Princeton | | – | | 3 | – | 5 | – | 1 |
| Temple | | – | | 2 | – | 5 | – | 3 |
| Columbia | | – | | 3 | – | 6 | – | 0 |
| Pittsburgh | | – | | 3 | – | 6 | – | 0 |
| Tufts | | – | | 2 | – | 5 | – | 1 |
| Franklin & Marshall | | – | | 1 | – | 4 | – | 2 |
| Massachusetts State | | – | | 2 | – | 5 | – | 0 |
| Harvard | | – | | 2 | – | 6 | – | 1 |
| Manhattan | | – | | 2 | – | 6 | – | 0 |
| CCNY | | – | | 1 | – | 7 | – | 1 |
Rankings from AP Poll

The 1942 Boston College Eagles football team was an American football team that represented Boston College as an independent during the 1942 college football season. In their second year under head coach Denny Myers, the Eagles compiled an 8–1 record in the regular season, were ranked No. 8 in the final AP poll, and went on to lose to Alabama in the 1943 Orange Bowl. The Eagles captured the Lambert-Meadowlands Trophy (emblematic of the 'Eastern championship').

Boston College won its first eight games of the season, climbing to No. 1 in the AP Poll. A victory in the final game of the regular season against rival Holy Cross would have likely resulted in a national championship for Boston College. The result, however, was a stunning rout loss, 12–55. The Eagles team canceled their planned post-game celebration at the Cocoanut Grove nightclub in Boston, which inadvertently saved the team from the Cocoanut Grove fire which killed 492 people that night.

Team co-captain and fullback Mike Holovak was a consensus pick on the 1942 All-America team and finished fourth in Heisman Trophy voting. He finished his career as Boston College's all-time leading rusher, with 2,011 yards and 23 touchdowns. Holovak returned to coach the Eagles from 1951 to 1959.

Boston College ranked first nationally in rushing defense (48.9 yards allowed per game) and second in rushing offense (292.8 yards per game). They also ranked third nationally in both total offense (410.7 yards per game) and total defense (131.8 yards per game) and fourth in scoring offense (28.2 points per game).

The team played all of its regular season games at Fenway Park in Boston.

== Schedule ==
| Date | Opponent | Rank | Site | Result | Attendance | Source |
|---|---|---|---|---|---|---|
| October 3 | West Virginia | | Fenway Park; Boston, MA | W 33–0 | 15,000–18,000 | |
| October 10 | Clemson | | Fenway Park; Boston, MA (rivalry) | W 14–7 | 18,500–23,400 | |
| October 17 | North Carolina Pre-Flight | No. 11 | Fenway Park; Boston, MA | W 7–6 | 25,107 | |
| October 24 | Wake Forest | No. 10 | Fenway Park; Boston, MA | W 27–0 | 20,000 | |
| October 31 | Georgetown | No. 7 | Fenway Park; Boston, MA | W 47–0 | 30,000 | |
| November 7 | Temple | No. 5 | Fenway Park; Boston, MA | W 28–0 | 24,000 | |
| November 14 | Fordham | No. 3 | Fenway Park; Boston, MA | W 56–6 | 36,300 | |
| November 21 | vs. Boston University | No. 3 | Fenway Park; Boston, MA (rivalry) | W 37–0 | 10,000 | |
| November 28 | vs. Holy Cross | No. 1 | Fenway Park; Boston, MA (rivalry) | L 12–55 | 41,300 | |
| January 1, 1943 | vs. No. 10 Alabama | No. 8 | Burdine Stadium; Miami, FL (Orange Bowl) | L 21–37 | 30,000 | |
Rankings from AP Poll released prior to the game

== Rankings ==
Ranking movements Legend: ██ Increase in ranking ██ Decrease in ranking ( ) = First-place votes
| | Week | | | | | | | |
| Poll | 1 | 2 | 3 | 4 | 5 | 6 | 7 | Final |
|---|---|---|---|---|---|---|---|---|
| AP | 11 (1) | 10 (4) | 7 (4) | 5 (13) | 3 (10) | 3 (37) | 1 (47) | 8 |
