= 1942 Manhattan Jaspers football team =

American college football season

1942 Manhattan Jaspers football
- Conference: Independent
- Record: 2–6
- Head coach: Herb Kopf (5th season)
- Home stadium: Polo Grounds

1942 Eastern college football independents records
	Conf.			Overall
Team	W	L	T	W		L		T
Williams		–		7	–	1	–	0
No. 19 Penn State		–		6	–	1	–	1
No. 8 Boston College		–		8	–	2	–	0
Buffalo		–		6	–	2	–	0
Bucknell		–		6	–	2	–	1
Colgate		–		6	–	2	–	1
Army		–		6	–	3	–	0
Syracuse		–		6	–	3	–	0
Duquesne		–		6	–	3	–	1
Yale		–		5	–	3	–	0
Fordham		–		5	–	3	–	1
Penn		–		5	–	3	–	1
No. T–19 Holy Cross		–		5	–	4	–	1
Dartmouth		–		5	–	4	–	0
Brown		–		4	–	4	–	0
Villanova		–		4	–	4	–	0
Vermont		–		4	–	3	–	0
Carnegie Tech		–		3	–	3	–	0
Boston University		–		4	–	5	–	0
Cornell		–		3	–	5	–	1
Princeton		–		3	–	5	–	1
Temple		–		2	–	5	–	3
Columbia		–		3	–	6	–	0
Pittsburgh		–		3	–	6	–	0
Tufts		–		2	–	5	–	1
Franklin & Marshall		–		1	–	4	–	2
Massachusetts State		–		2	–	5	–	0
Harvard		–		2	–	6	–	1
Manhattan		–		2	–	6	–	0
CCNY		–		1	–	7	–	1
Rankings from AP Poll

The 1942 Manhattan Jaspers football team was an American football team that represented Manhattan College as an independent during the 1942 college football season. In its fifth and final season under head coach Herb Kopf, the team compiled a 2–6 record and was outscored by a total of 148 to 63.

Manhattan was ranked at No. 107 (out of 590 college and military teams) in the final rankings under the Litkenhous Difference by Score System for 1942.

In July 1943, coach Kopf announced that Manhattan was abandoning football due to the manpower shortage resulting from wartime military service. Manhattan's usual enrollment had dropped from 1,000 students to 300 civilians along with 400 Army trainees, with the latter group being prohibited by War Department policy from participating in varsity athletics. Manhattan's decision followed a similar decision announced days earlier by Fordham. It was part of a trend among Catholic universities during the war and immediate post-war years to terminate their football programs. The trend also involved Gonzaga (1941); Providence (1941); Creighton (1942); Saint Louis (1949); Portland (1949); Saint Mary's (1950); (Note: Saint Mary's did make a comeback to football at "College Division" (ancestor of NCAA Division II and III) level between 1959 and 1992, and would play as an independent in NCAA division I-AA (ancestor of today's Football Championship Subdivision) between 1993 and 2003, before dropping football again after 2003.) Mount St. Mary's (1950); Niagara (1950); Loyola (1951); San Francisco (1951); (Note: San Francisco did make a comeback to football at "College Division" level between 1959 and 1982, but has not fielded a varsity football team since 1983.) St. Bonaventure (1951) and Santa Clara (1952). (Note: Santa Clara did make a comeback to football at "College Division" level between 1959 and 1992, but has not fielded a varsity football team since 1993.)

== Schedule ==
Date	Opponent	Site	Result	Attendance	Source
October 3	Muhlenberg	Polo Grounds; New York, NY	W 27–7		
October 10	at Georgetown	Griffith Stadium; Washington, DC	L 7–9	12,000	
October 18	Detroit	Polo Grounds; New York, NY	L 7–21	12,500	
October 24	Duquesne	Polo Grounds; New York, NY	W 10–7		
November 1	at Villanova	Shibe Park; Philadelphia, PA	L 0–32		
November 8	at Marquette	Marquette Stadium; Milwaukee, WI	L 12–27	14,000	
November 14	North Carolina Pre-Flight	Polo Grounds; New York, NY	L 0–17		
November 21	at Holy Cross	Fitton Field; Worcester, MA	L 0–28		
