= 1942 Duquesne Dukes football team =

American college football season

1942 Duquesne Dukes football
- Conference: Independent
- Record: 6–3–1
- Head coach: Aldo Donelli (4th season)
- Home stadium: Forbes Field

1942 Eastern college football independents records
	Conf.			Overall
Team	W	L	T	W		L		T
Williams		–		7	–	1	–	0
No. 19 Penn State		–		6	–	1	–	1
No. 8 Boston College		–		8	–	2	–	0
Buffalo		–		6	–	2	–	0
Bucknell		–		6	–	2	–	1
Colgate		–		6	–	2	–	1
Army		–		6	–	3	–	0
Syracuse		–		6	–	3	–	0
Duquesne		–		6	–	3	–	1
Yale		–		5	–	3	–	0
Fordham		–		5	–	3	–	1
Penn		–		5	–	3	–	1
No. T–19 Holy Cross		–		5	–	4	–	1
Dartmouth		–		5	–	4	–	0
Brown		–		4	–	4	–	0
Villanova		–		4	–	4	–	0
Vermont		–		4	–	3	–	0
Carnegie Tech		–		3	–	3	–	0
Boston University		–		4	–	5	–	0
Cornell		–		3	–	5	–	1
Princeton		–		3	–	5	–	1
Temple		–		2	–	5	–	3
Columbia		–		3	–	6	–	0
Pittsburgh		–		3	–	6	–	0
Tufts		–		2	–	5	–	1
Franklin & Marshall		–		1	–	4	–	2
Massachusetts State		–		2	–	5	–	0
Harvard		–		2	–	6	–	1
Manhattan		–		2	–	6	–	0
CCNY		–		1	–	7	–	1
Rankings from AP Poll

The 1942 Duquesne Dukes football team was an American football team that represented Duquesne University as an independent during the 1942 college football season. In its fourth season under head coach Aldo Donelli, Duquesne compiled a 6–3–1 record and outscored opponents by a total of 143 to 58.

Duquesne was ranked at No. 65 (out of 590 college and military teams) in the final rankings under the Litkenhous Difference by Score System for 1942.

== Schedule ==
Date	Opponent	Rank	Site	Result	Attendance	Source
September 26	Waynesburg		Forbes Field; Pittsburgh, PA	W 26–0		
October 3	at Holy Cross		Fitton Field; Worcester, MA	W 25–0		
October 10	Kansas State		Forbes Field; Pittsburgh, PA	W 33–0		
October 17	at North Carolina	No. 13	Kenan Memorial Stadium; Chapel Hill, NC	L 6–13	14,000	
October 24	at Manhattan		Polo Grounds; New York, NY	L 7–10		
October 31	Saint Vincent		Forbes Field; Pittsburgh, PA	W 14–0		
November 7	Saint Mary's		Forbes Field; Pittsburgh, PA	T 7–7	13,995	
November 14	at Mississippi State		Scott Field; Starkville, MS	L 6–28		
November 22	at Villanova		Villanova Stadium; Villanova, PA	W 6–0		
November 26	Lakehurst NAS		Forbes Field; Pittsburgh, PA	W 13–0	8,083	
Rankings from AP Poll released prior to the game

== Rankings ==
Ranking movements Legend: ██ Increase in ranking ██ Decrease in ranking — = Not ranked ( ) = First-place votes
	Week							
Poll	1	2	3	4	5	6	7	Final
AP	13 (2)	—	—	—	—	—	—	—
