= 1942 CCNY Beavers football team =

American college football season

1942 CCNY Beavers football
- Conference: Independent
- Record: 1–7–1
- Head coach: Doc Alexander (1st season)
- Home stadium: Lewisohn Stadium

1942 Eastern college football independents records
	Conf.			Overall
Team	W	L	T	W		L		T
Williams		–		7	–	1	–	0
No. 19 Penn State		–		6	–	1	–	1
No. 8 Boston College		–		8	–	2	–	0
Buffalo		–		6	–	2	–	0
Bucknell		–		6	–	2	–	1
Colgate		–		6	–	2	–	1
Army		–		6	–	3	–	0
Syracuse		–		6	–	3	–	0
Duquesne		–		6	–	3	–	1
Yale		–		5	–	3	–	0
Fordham		–		5	–	3	–	1
Penn		–		5	–	3	–	1
No. T–19 Holy Cross		–		5	–	4	–	1
Dartmouth		–		5	–	4	–	0
Brown		–		4	–	4	–	0
Villanova		–		4	–	4	–	0
Vermont		–		4	–	3	–	0
Carnegie Tech		–		3	–	3	–	0
Boston University		–		4	–	5	–	0
Cornell		–		3	–	5	–	1
Princeton		–		3	–	5	–	1
Temple		–		2	–	5	–	3
Columbia		–		3	–	6	–	0
Pittsburgh		–		3	–	6	–	0
Tufts		–		2	–	5	–	1
Franklin & Marshall		–		1	–	4	–	2
Massachusetts State		–		2	–	5	–	0
Harvard		–		2	–	6	–	1
Manhattan		–		2	–	6	–	0
CCNY		–		1	–	7	–	1
Rankings from AP Poll

The 1942 CCNY Beavers football team was an American football team that represented the City College of New York (CCNY) as an independent during the 1942 college football season. In their first season under head coach Doc Alexander, the team compiled a 1–7–1 record.

== Schedule ==
Date	Opponent	Site	Result	Attendance	Source
October 3	Manhattan Beach Coast Guard	Lewisohn Stadium; New York, NY	L 0–31		
October 10	Lebanon Valley	Lewisohn Stadium; New York, NY	L 0–36		
October 17	at Montclair State	Montclair, NJ	L 0–25		
October 25	Susquehanna	Lewisohn Stadium; New York, NY	L 0–6		
October 30	at Hobart	Geneva, NY	W 20–6		
November 3	Fort Totten	Lewisohn Stadium; New York, NY	L 0–51		
November 7	Moravian	Lewisohn Stadium; New York, NY	L 0–32		
November 14	at Brooklyn	Kingsmen Field; Brooklyn, NY	T 7–7	4,500	
November 26	at Brooklyn	Kingsmen Field; Brooklyn, NY (Red Cross Charity Game)	L 26–27	5,500	
