= 1942 Brown Bears football team =

American college football season

1942 Brown Bears football
- Conference: Independent
- Record: 4–4
- Head coach: Skip Stahley (2nd season)
- Home stadium: Brown Stadium

1942 Eastern college football independents records
	Conf.			Overall
Team	W	L	T	W		L		T
Williams		–		7	–	1	–	0
No. 19 Penn State		–		6	–	1	–	1
No. 8 Boston College		–		8	–	2	–	0
Buffalo		–		6	–	2	–	0
Bucknell		–		6	–	2	–	1
Colgate		–		6	–	2	–	1
Army		–		6	–	3	–	0
Syracuse		–		6	–	3	–	0
Duquesne		–		6	–	3	–	1
Yale		–		5	–	3	–	0
Fordham		–		5	–	3	–	1
Penn		–		5	–	3	–	1
No. T–19 Holy Cross		–		5	–	4	–	1
Dartmouth		–		5	–	4	–	0
Brown		–		4	–	4	–	0
Villanova		–		4	–	4	–	0
Vermont		–		4	–	3	–	0
Carnegie Tech		–		3	–	3	–	0
Boston University		–		4	–	5	–	0
Cornell		–		3	–	5	–	1
Princeton		–		3	–	5	–	1
Temple		–		2	–	5	–	3
Columbia		–		3	–	6	–	0
Pittsburgh		–		3	–	6	–	0
Tufts		–		2	–	5	–	1
Franklin & Marshall		–		1	–	4	–	2
Massachusetts State		–		2	–	5	–	0
Harvard		–		2	–	6	–	1
Manhattan		–		2	–	6	–	0
CCNY		–		1	–	7	–	1
Rankings from AP Poll

The 1942 Brown Bears football team represented Brown University during the 1942 college football season.

In their second season under head coach Jacob N. "Skip" Stahley, the Bears compiled a 4–4 record, and were outscored 114 to 96 by opponents. Team captains were named on a game-by-game basis.

Brown was ranked at No. 103 (out of 590 college and military teams) in the final rankings under the Litkenhous Difference by Score System for 1942.

Brown played its home games at Brown Stadium on the East Side of Providence, Rhode Island.

== Schedule ==
Date	Opponent	Site	Result	Attendance	Source
October 3	Rhode Island State	Brown Stadium; Providence, RI (rivalry)	W 28–0	9,000	
October 10	at Columbia	Baker Field; New York, NY	W 28–21	17,000	
October 17	Lafayette	Brown Stadium; Providence, RI	W 7–0	10,000	
October 24	at Princeton	Palmer Stadium; Princeton, NJ	L 13–32	15,000	
October 31	at Yale	Yale Bowl; New Haven, CT	L 0–27	20,000	
November 7	Holy Cross	Brown Stadium; Providence, RI	W 20–14		
November 14	at Harvard	Harvard Stadium; Boston, MA	L 0–7	9,000	
November 26	Colgate	Brown Stadium; Providence, RI	L 0–13	8,000	
