= 1942 college football season =

American college football season

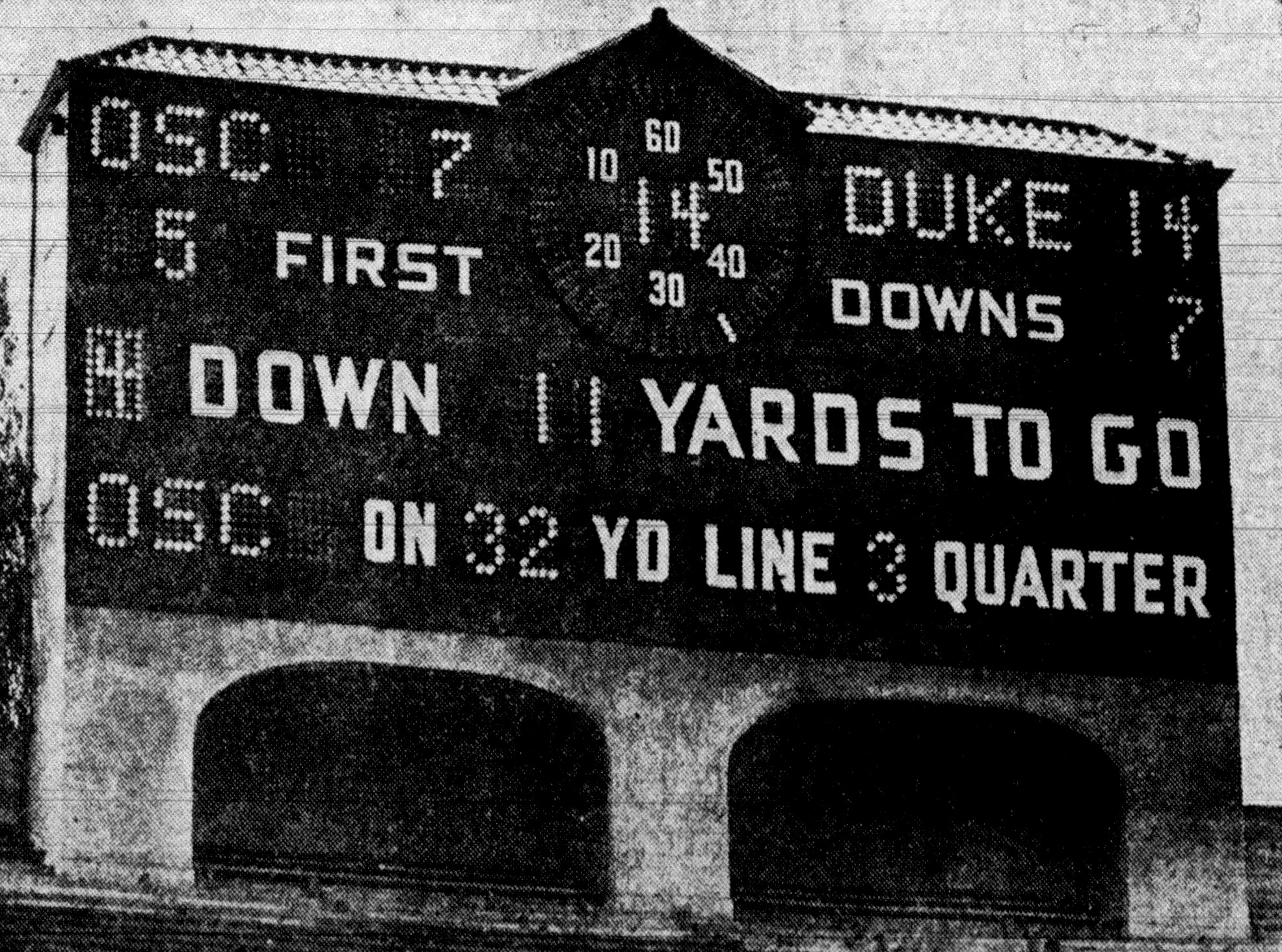
- Rose Bowl scoreboard, preseason game of OSC (Army) v Duke All-Stars
- First AP No. 1 of season: Ohio State
- Number of bowls: 5
- Champion(s): Ohio State (AP); Georgia (various)
- Heisman: Frank Sinkwich (halfback, Georgia)

The 1942 college football season was the 74th season of intercollegiate football in the United States. Competition included schools from the Big Ten Conference, the Pacific Coast Conference (PCC), the Southeastern Conference (SEC), the Big Six Conference, the Southern Conference, the Southwestern Conference, and numerous smaller conferences and independent programs. The season was the first after the entry of the United States into World War II.

The teams ranked highest in the final AP poll in December 1942 were:

1. The Ohio State Buckeyes won the Big Ten championship and compiled an overall record of 9–1 record with the team's one loss coming against No. 3 Wisconsin. The Buckeyes ranked second nationally in scoring offense (33.7 points per game) and fourth in total offense (397.5 yards per game). They were ranked No. 1 in the final AP Poll but did not appear in a bowl game. Gene Fekete led the Big Ten with 910 rushing yards. Ohio State was selected as the national champion by the Associated Press (AP).
2. The Georgia Bulldogs won the SEC championship and had an overall record of 11–1, including a victory over UCLA in the 1943 Rose Bowl. The Bulldogs ranked first nationally with 429.5 yards of total offense per game and were voted second in the final AP Poll in December 1942, prior to the Rose Bowl.
3. The Wisconsin Badgers finished second in the Big Ten with an overall record of 8–1–1 record, including a 17–7 victory over eventual AP national champion Ohio State. They were ranked No. 3 in the final AP Poll. The Helms Athletic Foundation selected Wisconsin as 1942 national champions following the bowl games.
4. The Tulsa Golden Hurricane won the Missouri Valley Conference (MVC) championship with a 10–1 record and was ranked No. 4 in the final AP Poll. They ranked first nationally in scoring offense (39.5 points per game) and passing offense (233.9 yards per game). Glenn Dobbs ranked fourth nationally with 1,427 yards of total offense.
5. The Georgia Tech Yellow Jackets finished second in the SEC and compiled a 9–2 record, including a loss to Texas in the 1943 Cotton Bowl Classic. They were ranked No. 5 in the final AP Poll.

Frank Sinkwich of Georgia won the Heisman Trophy and led the nation with 2,187 yards of total offense (including 1,392 passing yards), making him the first major-college player to tally more than 2,000 yards in a season. Paul Governali of Columbia won the Maxwell Award. The year's other statistical leaders included Rudy Mobley of Hardin-Simmons with 1,281 rushing yards, Ray Evans of Kansas with 1,117 passing yards, Harding Miller of SMU with 531 receiving yards, and Bob Steuber of Missouri with 121 points scored.

With large numbers of college and professional football players serving in the armed forces, "service teams" competed against the college teams. In a separate AP Service poll, the final top teams were Great Lakes Navy (No. 1), Iowa Pre-Flight (No. 2), and Georgia Pre-Flight (No. 3).

== Conference and program changes ==
=== Conference changes ===
The Nebraska Intercollegiate Athletic Association, which had been active since 1928, played its final season in 1942. The Northern Teachers Athletic Conference, an active NCAA Division II conference now known as the Northern Sun Intercollegiate Conference, changed its name to the State Teacher's College Conference of Minnesota.

=== Membership changes ===
School	1941 Conference	1942 Conference
American Eagles	Mason-Dixon	Dropped Program
Centenary Gentlemen	SIAA	Dropped program
Gonzaga (WA) Bulldogs	Independent	Dropped Program
Oglethorpe Stormy Petrels	Independent	Dropped program
Providence Friars	Independent	Dropped program
Transylvania Pioneers	SIAA	Dropped program

== September ==
On September 19, in Louisville, Georgia defeated Kentucky, 7–6. The following Friday, Georgia defeated the Jacksonville Naval Air Station, 14–0, in Macon. The soldiers at the Flight School at the University of Iowa, organized as the Iowa Pre-Flight Seahawks, overwhelmed Kansas, 61–0.

Most schools got their seasons underway on September 26. Defending champion Minnesota beat Pittsburgh, 50–7. Duke beat Davidson 21–0. Notre Dame and Wisconsin played to a 7–7 tie in Madison. Illinois beat South Dakota 46–0. In Montgomery, Alabama beat South Louisiana Institute (later University of Louisiana at Lafayette), 54–0. Texas beat the Corpus Christi Naval Air Station, 18–7. Michigan beat the Great Lakes Naval Training Station, 9–0. Before its smallest crowd since 1933 (22,555) Ohio State defeated a service team, the Fort Knox Armoraiders, 59–0. Iowa Pre-Flight won again, at Northwestern, 20–12.

== October ==
October 3

Minnesota's winning streak ended when the defending national champs lost their first game in almost four years, to the Seahawks of Iowa Pre-Flight (who just happened to be coached that season by "former" Minnesota head coach Bernie Bierman who had taken leave from Minnesota to serve as an officer in the military during World War II), 7–6. Ohio State beat Indiana 32–21. Michigan beat Michigan State 20–0. Illinois defeated Butler 67–0. Texas beat LSU 27–14. Notre Dame lost to Georgia Tech 13–6. Georgia defeated Furman 40–7. Alabama beat Mississippi State 21–6. Duke lost at Wake Forest, 20–7.

October 10

Minnesota lost at Illinois, 20–13. Ohio State beat visiting USC, 28–12. Michigan lost to Iowa Pre-Flight, 26–14. Georgia beat Ole Miss, 48–13, at Memphis. In Mobile, Alabama defeated the Pensacola NAS, 27–0. Texas lost at Tulane, 18–7. In the poll that followed, the Top Five consisted of three teams from the Big Nine (No. 1 Ohio State, No. 3 Michigan, and No. 5 Illinois) and two from the SEC (No. 2 Georgia and No. 4 Alabama).

October 17

No. 1 Ohio State beat Purdue 26–0. No. 2 Georgia beat Tulane 40–0. No. 3 Michigan defeated Northwestern 34–16. In Birmingham, No. 4 Alabama beat No. 15 Tennessee, 8–0. No. 5 Illinois won at No. 19 Iowa, 12–7. Losing also that day was Iowa Pre-Flight, which sustained its first loss at Notre Dame, 28–0.

In the next poll, the Top Five shuffled slightly, with Alabama and Michigan trading places: Ohio State (No. 1), Georgia (No. 2), Alabama (No. 3), Michigan (No. 4), Illinois (No. 5).

October 24

No. 1 Ohio State won at Northwestern 20–6. No. 2 Georgia won at Cincinnati 35–13. No. 3 Alabama won at Kentucky, 14–0. No. 4 Michigan lost at No. 13 Minnesota, 16–14. No. 5 Illinois lost to No. 8 Notre Dame, 21–14. No. 6 Georgia Tech won at Navy, 21–0.

In the poll that followed, Notre Dame and Georgia Tech replaced Michigan and Illinois: Ohio State (No. 1), Georgia (No. 2), Alabama (No. 3), Notre Dame (No. 4), Georgia Tech (No. 5).

October 31

No. 1 Ohio State lost at No. 6 Wisconsin, 17–7. In Atlanta, No. 2 Georgia beat No. 3 Alabama, 21–10. No. 4 Notre Dame beat Navy in Cleveland, 9–0. No. 5 Georgia Tech won at Duke, 26–7. No. 7 Boston College beat Georgetown, 47–0. The Georgia Bulldogs took over first place in the poll that followed, and Wisconsin and Boston College moved in while Ohio State and Alabama fell out: 1. Georgia 2. Wisconsin 3. Georgia Tech 4. Notre Dame 5. Boston College.

== November ==
November 7

In Jacksonville, No. 1 Georgia beat Florida, 75–0. No. 2 Wisconsin lost at unranked Iowa, 6–0. No. 3 Georgia Tech beat Kentucky 47–7. No. 4 Notre Dame beat Army 13–0 at Yankee Stadium. No. 5 Boston College beat Temple, 28–0. No. 8 Alabama beat South Carolina 29–0 and moved into the Top Five as Wisconsin dropped out. The nation's top two teams were Georgia and Georgia Tech: Georgia (No. 1), Georgia Tech (No. 2), Boston College (No. 3), Notre Dame (No. 4), Alabama (No. 5).

November 14

No. 1 Georgia won at Chattanooga, 40–0. In Atlanta, No. 2 Georgia Tech beat No. 5 Alabama 7–0. No. 3 Boston College beat Fordham at home, 56–6. No. 4 Notre Dame lost to No. 6 Michigan, 32–20, while in Cleveland, No. 10 Ohio State beat No. 13 Illinois 44–20. The poll: Georgia (No. 1), Georgia Tech (No. 2), Boston College (No. 3), Michigan (No. 4), Ohio State (No. 5).

November 21

In Columbus, Georgia, No. 1 Georgia lost to unranked Auburn, 27–13. No. 2 Georgia Tech beat Florida 20–7. No. 3 Boston College defeated Boston University, 37–0. No. 4 Michigan and No. 5 Ohio State met in Columbus, with OSU winning 21–7, capturing the Big Nine championship. No. 7 Wisconsin beat No. 10 Minnesota 21–6 to finish its season at 8–1–1. In the next poll, the Boston College Eagles were No. 1: Boston College (No. 1), Georgia Tech (No. 2), Ohio State (No. 3), Wisconsin (No. 4), Georgia (No. 5).

November 28

No. 1 Boston College lost to unranked Holy Cross, 55–12. No. 2 Georgia Tech visited No. 5 Georgia, and lost 34–0. No. 3 Ohio State defeated the Iowa Pre-Flight Seahawks, 41–12, finishing 9–1–0 and capturing the No. 1 ranking in the final AP poll, ahead of No. 2 Georgia, No. 3 Wisconsin, No. 4 Tulsa, and No. 5 Georgia Tech.

== Conference standings ==
=== Major conference standings ===
1942 Big Six Conference football standings
	Conf.					Overall
Team	W		L		T	W		L		T
Missouri $	4	–	0	–	1	8	–	3	–	1
Oklahoma	3	–	1	–	1	3	–	5	–	2
Nebraska	3	–	2	–	0	3	–	7	–	0
Kansas State	2	–	3	–	0	3	–	8	–	0
Iowa State	1	–	4	–	0	3	–	6	–	0
Kansas	1	–	4	–	0	2	–	8	–	0
$ – Conference champion

1942 Big Ten Conference football standings
	Conf.					Overall
Team	W		L		T	W		L		T
No. 1 Ohio State $	5	–	1	–	0	9	–	1	–	0
No. 3 Wisconsin	4	–	1	–	0	8	–	1	–	1
No. 9 Michigan	3	–	2	–	0	7	–	3	–	0
Illinois	3	–	2	–	0	6	–	4	–	0
Iowa	3	–	3	–	0	6	–	4	–	0
No. 19 Minnesota	3	–	3	–	0	5	–	4	–	0
Indiana	2	–	2	–	0	7	–	3	–	0
Purdue	1	–	4	–	0	1	–	8	–	0
Northwestern	0	–	6	–	0	1	–	9	–	0
$ – Conference champion; Rankings from AP Poll

1942 Border Conference football standings
	Conf.					Overall
Team	W		L		T	W		L		T
Hardin–Simmons +	4	–	0	–	1	9	–	1	–	1
Texas Tech +	3	–	0	–	1	4	–	5	–	1
West Texas State	5	–	2	–	0	7	–	2	–	0
Arizona	4	–	2	–	0	6	–	4	–	0
Texas Mines	4	–	3	–	0	5	–	4	–	0
New Mexico	3	–	4	–	0	4	–	5	–	2
Arizona State	2	–	5	–	0	2	–	8	–	0
Arizona State–Flagstaff	1	–	4	–	0	1	–	5	–	0
New Mexico A&M	0	–	6	–	0	1	–	8	–	0
+ – Conference co-champions

1942 Missouri Valley Conference football standings
	Conf.					Overall
Team	W		L		T	W		L		T
No. 4 Tulsa $	5	–	0	–	0	10	–	1	–	0
Oklahoma A&M	4	–	1	–	0	6	–	3	–	1
Washington University	2	–	3	–	0	5	–	5	–	0
Saint Louis	2	–	3	–	0	4	–	5	–	0
Creighton	1	–	4	–	0	5	–	4	–	0
Drake	1	–	4	–	0	3	–	7	–	0
$ – Conference champion; Rankings from AP Poll

1942 Mountain States Conference football standings
	Conf.					Overall
Team	W		L		T	W		L		T
Colorado +	5	–	1	–	0	7	–	2	–	0
Utah +	5	–	1	–	0	6	–	3	–	0
Denver	3	–	2	–	1	6	–	3	–	1
Utah State	2	–	3	–	1	6	–	3	–	1
Colorado A&M	2	–	3	–	0	4	–	3	–	0
BYU	1	–	4	–	0	2	–	5	–	0
Wyoming	1	–	5	–	0	3	–	5	–	0
+ – Conference co-champions

1942 Pacific Coast Conference football standings
	Conf.					Overall
Team	W		L		T	W		L		T
No. 13 UCLA $	6	–	1	–	0	7	–	4	–	0
Washington State	5	–	1	–	1	6	–	2	–	2
No. 12 Stanford	5	–	2	–	0	6	–	4	–	0
USC	4	–	2	–	1	5	–	5	–	1
Oregon State	4	–	4	–	0	4	–	5	–	1
Washington	3	–	3	–	2	4	–	3	–	3
California	3	–	4	–	0	5	–	5	–	0
Oregon	2	–	5	–	0	2	–	6	–	0
Idaho	1	–	5	–	0	3	–	7	–	0
Montana	0	–	6	–	0	0	–	8	–	0
$ – Conference champion; Rankings from AP Poll

1942 Southeastern Conference football standings
	Conf.					Overall
Team		W		L			W		L
No. 2 Georgia $	6	–	1	–	0	11	–	1	–	0
No. 5 Georgia Tech	4	–	1	–	0	9	–	2	–	0
No. 7 Tennessee	4	–	1	–	0	9	–	1	–	1
No. 18 Mississippi State	5	–	2	–	0	8	–	2	–	0
No. 10 Alabama	4	–	2	–	0	8	–	3	–	0
LSU	3	–	2	–	0	7	–	3	–	0
No. 16 Auburn	3	–	3	–	0	6	–	4	–	1
Vanderbilt	2	–	4	–	0	6	–	4	–	0
Florida	1	–	3	–	0	3	–	7	–	0
Tulane	1	–	4	–	0	4	–	5	–	0
Kentucky	0	–	5	–	0	3	–	6	–	1
Ole Miss	0	–	5	–	0	2	–	7	–	0
$ – Conference champion; Rankings from AP Poll

1942 Southern Conference football standings
	Conf.					Overall
Team	W		L		T	W		L		T
No. 14 William & Mary $	4	–	0	–	0	9	–	1	–	1
VPI	5	–	1	–	0	7	–	2	–	1
Wake Forest	6	–	1	–	1	6	–	2	–	1
North Carolina	3	–	1	–	1	5	–	2	–	2
Duke	3	–	1	–	1	5	–	4	–	1
NC State	3	–	1	–	2	4	–	4	–	2
Furman	3	–	3	–	0	3	–	6	–	0
The Citadel	2	–	2	–	0	5	–	2	–	0
Clemson	2	–	3	–	1	3	–	6	–	1
Davidson	2	–	4	–	1	2	–	6	–	1
VMI	2	–	4	–	1	3	–	5	–	1
George Washington	2	–	4	–	0	3	–	6	–	0
Maryland	1	–	2	–	0	7	–	2	–	0
South Carolina	1	–	4	–	0	1	–	7	–	1
Richmond	1	–	5	–	0	3	–	6	–	1
Washington and Lee	0	–	4	–	0	1	–	8	–	0
$ – Conference champion; Rankings from AP Poll

1942 Southwest Conference football standings
	Conf.					Overall
Team	W		L		T	W		L		T
No. 11 Texas $	5	–	1	–	0	9	–	2	–	0
Rice	4	–	1	–	1	7	–	2	–	1
TCU	4	–	2	–	0	7	–	3	–	0
Baylor	3	–	2	–	1	6	–	4	–	1
Texas A&M	2	–	3	–	1	4	–	5	–	1
SMU	1	–	4	–	1	3	–	6	–	2
Arkansas	0	–	6	–	0	3	–	7	–	0
Rankings from AP Poll

=== Independents ===
1942 Eastern college football independents records
	Conf.			Overall
Team	W	L	T	W		L		T
Williams		–		7	–	1	–	0
No. 19 Penn State		–		6	–	1	–	1
No. 8 Boston College		–		8	–	2	–	0
Buffalo		–		6	–	2	–	0
Bucknell		–		6	–	2	–	1
Colgate		–		6	–	2	–	1
Army		–		6	–	3	–	0
Syracuse		–		6	–	3	–	0
Duquesne		–		6	–	3	–	1
Yale		–		5	–	3	–	0
Fordham		–		5	–	3	–	1
Penn		–		5	–	3	–	1
No. T–19 Holy Cross		–		5	–	4	–	1
Dartmouth		–		5	–	4	–	0
Brown		–		4	–	4	–	0
Villanova		–		4	–	4	–	0
Vermont		–		4	–	3	–	0
Carnegie Tech		–		3	–	3	–	0
Boston University		–		4	–	5	–	0
Cornell		–		3	–	5	–	1
Princeton		–		3	–	5	–	1
Temple		–		2	–	5	–	3
Columbia		–		3	–	6	–	0
Pittsburgh		–		3	–	6	–	0
Tufts		–		2	–	5	–	1
Franklin & Marshall		–		1	–	4	–	2
Massachusetts State		–		2	–	5	–	0
Harvard		–		2	–	6	–	1
Manhattan		–		2	–	6	–	0
CCNY		–		1	–	7	–	1
Rankings from AP Poll

1942 Midwestern college football independents records
	Conf.			Overall
Team	W	L	T	W		L		T
Central Michigan		–		6	–	0	–	0
Western Michigan		–		5	–	1	–	0
Cincinnati		–		8	–	2	–	0
Dayton		–		8	–	2	–	0
Marquette		–		7	–	2	–	0
No. 6 Notre Dame		–		7	–	2	–	2
Ohio		–		5	–	3	–	0
Detroit		–		5	–	4	–	0
Wichita		–		5	–	4	–	0
Michigan State		–		4	–	3	–	2
Michigan State Normal		–		3	–	3	–	1
Ohio Wesleyan		–		4	–	4	–	0
Xavier		–		4	–	5	–	0
Carthage		–		3	–	4	–	0
Miami (OH)		–		3	–	6	–	0
Wayne		–		1	–	6	–	1
Akron		–		0	–	7	–	2
Michigan Tech		–		0	–	3	–	0
Rankings from AP Poll

1942 Southern college football independents records
	Conf.			Overall
Team	W	L	T	W		L		T
Louisiana Normal (Grambling)		–		9	–	0	–	0
Delaware		–		8	–	0	–	0
Mississippi Southern		–		4	–	0	–	0
Sewanee		–		1	–	0	–	0
Miami (FL)		–		7	–	2	–	0
Delaware State		–		3	–	1	–	1
Middle Tennessee State Teachers		–		4	–	2	–	1
Chattanooga		–		7	–	4	–	0
Georgetown		–		5	–	3	–	1
Navy		–		5	–	4	–	0
West Virginia		–		5	–	4	–	0
Western Maryland		–		4	–	4	–	1
Tennessee Tech		–		3	–	4	–	2
Virginia		–		2	–	6	–	1
Roanoke		–		1	–	5	–	1

1942 Western college football independents records
	Conf.			Overall
Team	W	L	T	W		L		T
Fresno State		–		9	–	1	–	0
San Jose State		–		7	–	2	–	0
No. 17 Santa Clara		–		7	–	2	–	0
Portland		–		5	–	2	–	0
Idaho Southern Branch		–		4	–	2	–	0
Saint Mary's		–		6	–	3	–	1
San Francisco		–		6	–	4	–	0
Loyola (CA)		–		5	–	4	–	1
Nevada		–		4	–	3	–	1
Cal Poly		–		4	–	3	–	0
San Diego State		–		0	–	6	–	1
San Francisco State		–		0	–	6	–	0
Rankings from AP Poll

1942 military service football records
	Conf.			Overall
Team	W	L	T	W		L		T
No. 11 Second Air Force		–		11	–	0	–	1
No. 9 Manhattan Beach Coast Guard		–		6	–	0	–	1
No. 17 March Field		–		11	–	2	–	0
No. 3 Georgia Pre-Flight		–		7	–	1	–	1
No. 4 North Carolina Pre-Flight		–		8	–	2	–	1
No. 6 Jacksonville NAS		–		9	–	3	–	0
No. 1 Great Lakes Navy		–		8	–	3	–	1
No. 2 Iowa Pre-Flight		–		7	–	3	–	1
No. 15 Fort Riley		–		6	–	3	–	0
No. 14 Fort Monmouth		–		5	–	2	–	2
No. 5 Saint Mary's Pre-Flight		–		6	–	3	–	1
No. T–20 Fort Douglas		–		5	–	3	–	0
No. 10 Corpus Christi NAS		–		4	–	3	–	1
No. 16 Camp Davis		–		4	–	3	–	2
Albuquerque AAB		–		5	–	4	–	0
No. 13 Lakehurst NAS		–		4	–	4	–	1
Santa Ana AAB		–		4	–	4	–	0
Will Rogers AB		–		4	–	4	–	0
No. 7 Camp Grant		–		4	–	5	–	0
No. 8 Pensacola NAS		–		3	–	5	–	1
No. T–18 Fort Totten		–		3	–	5	–	1
Camp Pickett		–		1	–	6	–	0
No. 12 Fort Knox		–		2	–	6	–	0
Alameda Coast Guard		–		1	–	7	–	1
No. T–18 Spence Field		–		0	–	4	–	0
No. T–20 Daniel Field		–		0	–	6	–	0
Rankings from AP Service Poll

=== Minor conferences ===
Conference	Champion(s)	Record
Central Intercollegiate Athletics Association	Morgan State College	5–1–1
Central Intercollegiate Athletic Conference	Pittsburg State	5–0
Far Western Conference	Pacific (CA)	2–0
Indiana Intercollegiate Conference	Ball State Teachers College	5–0
Iowa Intercollegiate Athletic Conference	Dubuque	8–0
Kansas Collegiate Athletic Conference	Baker	6–0
Lone Star Conference	East Texas State Teachers	2–0–1
Michigan Intercollegiate Athletic Association	Alma	4–0
Midwest Collegiate Athletic Conference	Lawrence	5–0
Minnesota Intercollegiate Athletic Conference	Saint Thomas (MN)	5–0
Missouri Intercollegiate Athletic Association	Northwest Missouri State Teachers; Southeast Missouri State Teachers	3–1
Nebraska College Athletic Conference	Doane	4–0
Nebraska Intercollegiate Athletic Association	Nebraska State Teachers (UN–Kearney)	2–1
New Mexico Intercollegiate Conference	New Mexico State Teachers	1–0
North Central Intercollegiate Athletic Conference	Augustana (SD); Iowa State Teachers (Northern Iowa)	4–0; 5–0
North Dakota College Athletic Conference	North Dakota Science	5–0
Ohio Athletic Conference	Ohio Northern	5–0–1
Oklahoma Collegiate Athletic Conference	Central State College (OK)	2–0
Pacific Northwest Conference	Willamette	4–0
Pennsylvania State Athletic Conference	East Stroudsburg State Teachers	4–0
Rocky Mountain Athletic Conference	Colorado Mines	2–0
South Dakota Intercollegiate Conference	Augustana (SD)	2–0
Southern California Intercollegiate Athletic Conference	Occidental; Pomona-Pitzer; Whittier	2–1
Southern Intercollegiate Athletic Conference	Florida A&M College	7–0
Southwestern Athletic Conference	Texas College	4–0
State Teacher's College Conference of Minnesota	Mankato State Teachers; St. Cloud State Teachers	4–0
Texas Collegiate Athletic Conference	Howard Payne	4–0
Washington Intercollegiate Conference	Central Washington College	4–1–1
Wisconsin State Teachers College Conference	North: La Crosse Teachers; South: Platteville State Teachers	4–0; 3–0–1

=== Minor conference standings ===
1942 Badger State Conference football standings
	Conf.					Overall
Team	W		L		T	W		L		T
Milton +	3	–	1	–	0	3	–	2	–	0
Wisconsin Tech +	3	–	1	–	0	3	–	2	–	0
Northwestern (WI) +	3	–	1	–	0	3	–	3	–	0
Mission House	1	–	3	–	0	1	–	5	–	0
Wisconsin–Extension	0	–	4	–	0	0	–	4	–	0
+ – Conference co-champions

1942 Central Intercollegiate Conference football standings
	Conf.					Overall
Team	W		L		T	W		L		T
Pittsburg State $	5	–	0	–	0	7	–	1	–	0
St. Benedict's	4	–	1	–	0	6	–	2	–	0
Southwestern (KS)	2	–	2	–	1	4	–	3	–	2
Emporia State	2	–	2	–	1	3	–	4	–	1
Washburn	1	–	4	–	0	1	–	6	–	0
Fort Hays State	0	–	5	–	0	1	–	8	–	0
+ – Conference co-champions

1942 Colored Intercollegiate Athletic Association football standings
	Conf.					Overall
Team	W		L		T	W		L		T
Morgan State $	5	–	1	–	1	6	–	1	–	1
Johnson C. Smith	4	–	1	–	1	5	–	1	–	1
Virginia State	5	–	2	–	1	6	–	2	–	1
Bluefield State	2	–	1	–	3	4	–	1	–	3
Hampton	3	–	1	–	3	4	–	1	–	3
West Virginia State	2	–	2	–	0	6	–	2	–	0
Lincoln (PA)	1	–	1	–	1	2	–	3	–	1
North Carolina College	1	–	3	–	0	1	–	4	–	0
Virginia Union	1	–	4	–	0	2	–	5	–	0
North Carolina A&T	1	–	6	–	0	2	–	7	–	0
Howard	0	–	3	–	0	1	–	4	–	2
$ – Conference champion; Conference standings were based on the Dickinson System.

1942 Eastern Pennsylvania Collegiate Conference football standings
	Conf.					Overall
Team	W		L		T	W		L		T
Muhlenberg $	3	–	0	–	0	7	–	3	–	0
Gettysburg	3	–	1	–	0	5	–	3	–	0
Ursinus	1	–	2	–	1	1	–	2	–	1
Franklin & Marshall	0	–	2	–	1	1	–	4	–	2
Drexel	0	–	2	–	0	2	–	6	–	0
$ – Conference champion

1942 Far Western Conference football standings
	Conf.					Overall
Team	W		L		T	W		L		T
Pacific (CA) $	2	–	0	–	0	2	–	6	–	1
Chico State	1	–	1	–	0	5	–	1	–	0
Cal Aggies	0	–	2	–	0	1	–	6	–	0
$ – Conference champion

1942 Illinois College Conference football standings
	Conf.					Overall
Team	W		L		T	W		L		T
Millikin $	5	–	0	–	0	7	–	0	–	0
Augustana (IL)	4	–	1	–	0	7	–	1	–	0
Knox (IL)	2	–	1	–	0	6	–	2	–	0
Illinois Wesleyan	2	–	1	–	0	4	–	5	–	0
North Central (IL)	1	–	1	–	0	5	–	2	–	0
Bradley	0	–	1	–	0	4	–	4	–	0
Illinois College	0	–	3	–	0	3	–	4	–	1
Lake Forest	0	–	3	–	0	2	–	4	–	1
Monmouth (IL)	0	–	3	–	0	2	–	6	–	0
$ – Conference champion

1942 Illinois Intercollegiate Athletic Conference football standings
	Conf.					Overall
Team	W		L		T	W		L		T
Western Illinois $	3	–	0	–	1	5	–	0	–	2
Northern Illinois State	1	–	0	–	2	3	–	2	–	2
Illinois State Normal	2	–	1	–	1	2	–	5	–	1
Southern Illinois	1	–	3	–	0	2	–	4	–	0
Eastern Illinois	0	–	3	–	0	1	–	6	–	0
$ – Conference champion

1942 Indiana Intercollegiate Conference football standings
	Conf.					Overall
Team	W		L		T	W		L		T
Ball State +	5	–	0	–	0	6	–	2	–	0
Saint Joseph's (IN) +	3	–	0	–	0	7	–	0	–	1
Rose Poly	4	–	1	–	0	5	–	1	–	0
Wabash	4	–	1	–	0	4	–	2	–	1
DePauw	3	–	1	–	0	5	–	3	–	0
Valparaiso	3	–	2	–	0	4	–	4	–	0
Manchester	2	–	2	–	0	4	–	4	–	0
Hanover	2	–	3	–	0	2	–	5	–	0
Butler	1	–	2	–	0	2	–	7	–	0
Indiana State	1	–	3	–	0	4	–	3	–	0
Evansville	1	–	3	–	0	1	–	4	–	0
Franklin (IN)	1	–	5	–	0	1	–	7	–	0
Central Normal	0	–	3	–	0	0	–	4	–	0
Earlham	0	–	4	–	0	1	–	6	–	0
+ – Conference co-champions

1942 Iowa Conference football standings
	Conf.					Overall
Team	W		L		T	W		L		T
Dubuque $	8	–	0	–	0	8	–	0	–	0
St. Ambrose	1	–	0	–	0	3	–	4	–	1
Upper Iowa	4	–	1	–	0	4	–	1	–	0
Simpson (IA)	4	–	1	–	0	4	–	3	–	0
Wartburg	3	–	2	–	0	4	–	2	–	0
Parsons	2	–	1	–	2	3	–	3	–	2
Loras	1	–	1	–	0	5	–	3	–	0
Central (IA)	2	–	3	–	1	3	–	4	–	1
Buena Vista	1	–	3	–	1	1	–	4	–	1
Western Union	0	–	1	–	1	0	–	4	–	1
Luther	1	–	4	–	0	2	–	4	–	1
Iowa Wesleyan	1	–	4	–	0	1	–	6	–	0
Penn (IA)	0	–	7	–	1	0	–	7	–	1
$ – Conference champion

1942 Kansas Collegiate Athletic Conference football standings
	Conf.					Overall
Team	W		L		T	W		L		T
Baker $	6	–	0	–	0	7	–	0	–	0
Ottawa	4	–	1	–	1	5	–	1	–	1
Kansas Wesleyan	3	–	1	–	2	5	–	4	–	2
Bethany (KS)	3	–	2	–	1	3	–	3	–	1
McPherson	1	–	4	–	1	1	–	4	–	3
College of Emporia	1	–	4	–	1	1	–	5	–	1
Bethel (KS)	0	–	6	–	0	2	–	6	–	1
$ – Conference champion

1942 Lone Star Conference football standings
	Conf.					Overall
Team	W		L		T	W		L		T
East Texas State $	2	–	0	–	1	4	–	3	–	1
Sam Houston State	2	–	1	–	0	5	–	3	–	0
North Texas State	1	–	2	–	0	3	–	5	–	0
Southwest Texas State	0	–	2	–	1	3	–	4	–	1
$ – Conference champion

1942 Louisiana Intercollegiate Conference football standings
	Conf.					Overall
Team	W		L		T	W		L		T
Louisiana Normal $	3	–	0	–	0	6	–	2	–	0
Southwestern Louisiana	2	–	1	–	0	3	–	4	–	0
Louisiana Tech	1	–	2	–	0	6	–	3	–	0
Southeastern Louisiana	0	–	3	–	0	5	–	5	–	0
$ – Conference champion

1942 Michigan Intercollegiate Athletic Association football standings
	Conf.					Overall
Team	W		L		T	W		L		T
Alma $	4	–	0	–	0	7	–	0	–	0
Kalamazoo	2	–	2	–	0	4	–	3	–	0
Albion	2	–	2	–	0	4	–	4	–	0
Hillsdale	1	–	3	–	0	3	–	5	–	0
Hope	1	–	3	–	0	1	–	4	–	2
$ – Conference champion

1942 Middle Three Conference football standings
	Conf.					Overall
Team	W		L		T	W		L		T
Lehigh +	1	–	0	–	1	5	–	2	–	1
Lafayette +	1	–	0	–	1	3	–	5	–	1
Rutgers	0	–	2	–	0	3	–	4	–	1
$ – Conference champion

1942 Midwest Conference football standings
	Conf.					Overall
Team	W		L		T	W		L		T
Lawrence $	5	–	0	–	0	6	–	0	–	0
Knox	5	–	1	–	0	6	–	2	–	0
Grinnell	3	–	2	–	0	3	–	4	–	0
Cornell (IA)	3	–	3	–	0	4	–	3	–	0
Ripon	3	–	3	–	0	3	–	5	–	0
Monmouth (IL)	2	–	4	–	0	2	–	6	–	0
Beloit	1	–	5	–	0	1	–	5	–	0
Coe	1	–	5	–	0	1	–	6	–	0
$ – Conference champion

1942 Minnesota Intercollegiate Athletic Conference football standings
	Conf.					Overall
Team	W		L		T	W		L		T
St. Thomas (MN) +	5	–	0	–	0	8	–	0	–	0
Concordia (MN) +	3	–	0	–	1	6	–	0	–	1
Saint John's (MN)	4	–	1	–	1	4	–	1	–	1
Hamline	3	–	2	–	0	3	–	2	–	0
Gustavus Adolphus	2	–	2	–	0	4	–	4	–	0
Macalester	2	–	3	–	0	4	–	4	–	0
St. Olaf	2	–	3	–	0	2	–	4	–	1
Saint Mary's (MN)	0	–	5	–	0	1	–	7	–	0
Augsburg	0	–	5	–	0	0	–	6	–	0
+ – Conference co-champions

1942 Minnesota Teachers College Conference football standings
	Conf.					Overall
Team	W		L		T	W		L		T
St. Cloud State +	4	–	0	–	0	6	–	0	–	0
Mankato State +	4	–	0	–	0	4	–	2	–	0
Bemidji State	2	–	2	–	0	3	–	4	–	0
Duluth State	2	–	2	–	0	2	–	3	–	1
Winona State	0	–	4	–	0	2	–	4	–	1
Moorhead State	0	–	4	–	0	2	–	5	–	0
+ – Conference co-champions

1942 Missouri College Athletic Union football standings
	Conf.					Overall
Team	W		L		T	W		L		T
Missouri Valley $	4	–	0	–	0	9	–	0	–	0
William Jewell	2	–	1	–	0	4	–	3	–	1
Culver–Stockton	1	–	1	–	1	3	–	3	–	1
Central (MO)	0	–	2	–	1	4	–	3	–	1
Tarkio	0	–	3	–	0	2	–	6	–	0
$ – Conference champion

1942 Missouri Intercollegiate Athletic Association football standings
	Conf.					Overall
Team	W		L		T	W		L		T
Cape Girardeau +	3	–	1	–	0	6	–	2	–	0
Maryville (MO) +	3	–	1	–	0	4	–	2	–	1
Missouri Mines	2	–	2	–	0	3	–	4	–	0
Springfield (MO)	2	–	2	–	0	2	–	7	–	2
Warrensburg	0	–	4	–	0	0	–	7	–	0
+ – Conference co-champions

1942 Nebraska College Athletic Conference football standings
	Conf.					Overall
Team	W		L		T	W		L		T
Doane $	4	–	0	–	0	5	–	3	–	0
Nebraska Wesleyan	3	–	1	–	0	5	–	3	–	1
York (NE)	1	–	3	–	0	3	–	4	–	0
Midland	1	–	3	–	0	2	–	5	–	1
Hastings	1	–	3	–	0	1	–	8	–	0
$ – Conference champion

1942 Nebraska Intercollegiate Athletic Association football standings
	Conf.					Overall
Team	W		L		T	W		L		T
Kearney State $	2	–	1	–	0	6	–	2	–	0
Chadron State	1	–	1	–	0	4	–	1	–	1
Peru State	1	–	1	–	1	6	–	2	–	1
Wayne State (NE)	0	–	1	–	1	4	–	1	–	2
$ – Conference champion

1942 New England Conference football standings
	Conf.					Overall
Team	W		L		T	W		L		T
New Hampshire +	3	–	0	–	0	6	–	0	–	0
Connecticut +	2	–	0	–	0	6	–	2	–	0
Northeastern	0	–	1	–	0	0	–	5	–	1
Rhode Island State	0	–	2	–	0	3	–	3	–	0
Maine	0	–	2	–	0	2	–	4	–	0
+ – Conference co-champions

1942 North Central Conference football standings
	Conf.					Overall
Team	W		L		T	W		L		T
Iowa State Teachers +	5	–	0	–	0	8	–	1	–	0
Augustana (SD) +	4	–	0	–	0	8	–	0	–	0
South Dakota	4	–	2	–	0	5	–	3	–	0
South Dakota State	3	–	3	–	0	4	–	4	–	0
North Dakota	2	–	3	–	0	3	–	3	–	0
North Dakota Agricultural	2	–	3	–	0	2	–	5	–	1
Morningside	1	–	6	–	0	2	–	6	–	0
Omaha	0	–	4	–	0	1	–	5	–	0
+ – Conference co-champions

1942 North Dakota Intercollegiate Conference football standings
	Conf.					Overall
Team	W		L		T	W		L		T
Wahpeton $	4	–	0	–	0	4	–	0	–	0
Jamestown	3	–	1	–	0	4	–	2	–	1
Minot State	2	–	1	–	0	2	–	1	–	0
Mayville State	2	–	2	–	0	2	–	2	–	0
Ellendale	0	–	3	–	0	0	–	4	–	0
Valley City State	0	–	4	–	0	0	–	5	–	0
$ – Conference champion

1942 Northwest Conference football standings
	Conf.					Overall
Team	W		L		T	W		L		T
Willamette $	4	–	0	–	0	4	–	1	–	0
Puget Sound	2	–	1	–	0	4	–	2	–	0
Whitman	2	–	2	–	0	2	–	5	–	0
Linfield	0	–	1	–	1	2	–	1	–	1
Pacific (OR)	0	–	3	–	2	0	–	5	–	2
College of Idaho	0	–	1	–	1	0	–	3	–	1
$ – Conference champion

1942 Ohio Athletic Conference football standings
	Conf.					Overall
Team	W		L		T	W		L		T
Ohio Northern $	5	–	0	–	1	6	–	1	–	1
John Carroll	3	–	0	–	1	3	–	2	–	3
Toledo	1	–	0	–	1	4	–	4	–	1
Denison	4	–	1	–	1	6	–	2	–	1
Oberlin	2	–	1	–	0	5	–	1	–	1
Baldwin–Wallace	2	–	1	–	0	6	–	2	–	0
Otterbein	4	–	2	–	0	5	–	3	–	0
Kent State	2	–	1	–	0	5	–	3	–	0
Wooster	5	–	3	–	0	6	–	3	–	0
Bowling Green	1	–	1	–	1	6	–	2	–	1
Findlay	2	–	3	–	1	5	–	4	–	1
Heidelberg	2	–	3	–	0	4	–	4	–	0
Case	1	–	2	–	0	4	–	4	–	0
Capital	1	–	3	–	0	3	–	4	–	0
Muskingum	1	–	4	–	0	3	–	4	–	2
Wittenberg	1	–	4	–	1	1	–	5	–	1
Kenyon	0	–	2	–	0	5	–	2	–	0
Mount Union	0	–	6	–	0	1	–	6	–	0
$ – Conference champion

1942 Pennsylvania State Teachers College Conference football standings
	Conf.					Overall
Team	W		L		T	W		L		T
East Stroudsburg $	4	–	0	–	0	6	–	0	–	0
Lock Haven	4	–	0	–	1	6	–	0	–	1
Indiana (PA)	4	–	2	–	0	5	–	3	–	0
Slippery Rock	2	–	2	–	0	4	–	2	–	0
Mansfield	2	–	2	–	1	2	–	2	–	1
West Chester	1	–	2	–	0	5	–	3	–	1
Clarion	1	–	2	–	0	1	–	3	–	0
Edinboro	1	–	2	–	0	1	–	3	–	0
Shippensburg	1	–	4	–	0	2	–	4	–	0
Kutztown	0	–	4	–	0	1	–	4	–	0
$ – Conference champion

1942 Rocky Mountain Conference football standings
	Conf.					Overall
Team	W		L		T	W		L		T
Colorado Mines $	2	–	0	–	0	3	–	4	–	0
Colorado State–Greeley	1	–	1	–	0	4	–	5	–	0
Colorado College	0	–	2	–	0	3	–	4	–	0
$ – Conference champion

1942 Southern California Conference football standings
	Conf.					Overall
Team	W		L		T	W		L		T
Whittier +	2	–	1	–	0	5	–	4	–	0
Pomona +	2	–	1	–	0	3	–	3	–	1
Occidental +	2	–	1	–	0	3	–	4	–	0
Redlands	0	–	3	–	0	4	–	4	–	0
+ – Conference co-champions

1942 Southern Intercollegiate Athletic Conference football standings
	Conf.					Overall
Team	W		L		T	W		L		T
Florida A&M $	7	–	0	–	0	9	–	0	–	0
Tuskegee	6	–	1	–	0	7	–	3	–	0
Lane	4	–	1	–	0	7	–	4	–	0
Morris Brown	3	–	2	–	1	5	–	2	–	1
Clark (GA)	4	–	1	–	2	4	–	1	–	2
South Carolina State	4	–	2	–	1	4	–	2	–	1
Xavier (LA)	2	–	3	–	0	3	–	6	–	0
Benedict	2	–	3	–	0	4	–	5	–	0
Alabama A&M	2	–	3	–	0	3	–	5	–	0
Morehouse	1	–	5	–	0	3	–	5	–	0
Alabama State	0	–	8	–	0	0	–	8	–	0
Knoxville	0	–	7	–	0	0	–	7	–	0
$ – Conference champion; Standings were based on Dickinson System ratings.

1942 Southwestern Athletic Conference football standings
	Conf.					Overall
Team	W		L		T	W		L		T
Texas College $	4	–	0	–	0	7	–	1	–	0
Prairie View	3	–	1	–	0	5	–	2	–	0
Langston	1	–	2	–	1	6	–	2	–	1
Wiley	1	–	3	–	0	3	–	4	–	0
Southern	0	–	3	–	1	4	–	4	–	1
$ – Conference champion

1942 Texas Conference football standings
	Conf.					Overall
Team	W		L		T	W		L		T
Howard Payne $	4	–	0	–	0	7	–	2	–	0
Abilene Christian	3	–	1	–	0	6	–	2	–	0
Southwestern (TX)	2	–	2	–	0	6	–	4	–	0
McMurry	1	–	3	–	0	2	–	6	–	0
Austin	0	–	4	–	0	0	–	8	–	0
$ – Conference champion

1942 Washington Intercollegiate Conference football standings
	Conf.					Overall
Team	W		L		T	W		L		T
Central Washington $	4	–	1	–	1	5	–	1	–	2
Saint Martin's	3	–	1	–	0	6	–	2	–	0
Eastern Washington	2	–	2	–	0	3	–	4	–	0
Pacific Lutheran	1	–	3	–	1	2	–	5	–	1
Western Washington	0	–	3	–	2	1	–	4	–	2
$ – Conference champion

1942 West Virginia Intercollegiate Athletic Conference football standings
	Conf.					Overall
Team	W		L		T	W		L		T
Morris Harvey $	4	–	0	–	0	6	–	1	–	2
West Liberty State	4	–	1	–	0	5	–	3	–	0
Glenville State	4	–	2	–	0	4	–	2	–	0
Fairmont State	3	–	4	–	0	3	–	4	–	0
Potomac State	0	–	4	–	0	1	–	8	–	0
Bethany (WV) *	1	–	2	–	0	6	–	2	–	0
Marshall *	0	–	1	–	0	8	–	2	–	0
West Virginia Tech *	0	–	2	–	0	0	–	2	–	4
$ – Conference champion; * – Did not qualify for conference standings Ties did not count in conference standings.

1942 Wisconsin State Teachers College Conference football standings
	Conf.					Overall
Team	W		L		T	W		L		T
Northern Division
La Crosse State x	4	–	0	–	0	6	–	0	–	1
Stout Institute	2	–	2	–	0	3	–	2	–	0
Superior State	2	–	2	–	0	3	–	2	–	1
River Falls State	2	–	2	–	0	2	–	4	–	0
Eau Claire State	0	–	4	–	0	0	–	6	–	0
Southern Division
Milwaukee State x	3	–	0	–	1	3	–	0	–	3
Platteville State x	3	–	0	–	1	3	–	1	–	1
Whitewater State	2	–	2	–	0	2	–	4	–	0
Stevens Point State	1	–	3	–	0	1	–	4	–	0
Oshkosh State	0	–	4	–	0	0	–	5	–	0
x – Division champion/co-champions

== Rankings ==
Top 10 in final AP poll

1. Ohio State (9–1)
2. Georgia (10–1)
3. Wisconsin (8–1–1)
4. Tulsa (10–0)
5. Georgia Tech (9–1)
6. Notre Dame (7–2–1)
7. Tennessee (8–1–1)
8. Boston College (8–1)
9. Michigan (7–3)
10. Alabama (7–3)

== Heisman Trophy voting ==
The Heisman Trophy is given to the year's most outstanding player

Player	School	Position	Total
Frank Sinkwich	Georgia	HB	1,059
Paul Governali	Columbia	QB	218
Clint Castleberry	Georgia Tech	HB	99
Mike Holovak	Boston College	FB	90
Billy Hillenbrand	Indiana	HB	86
Angelo Bertelli	Notre Dame	QB	75
Dick Wildung	Minnesota	OT	71
Gene Fekete	Ohio State	FB	65
Glenn Dobbs	Tulsa	HB	63
Dave Schreiner	Wisconsin	E	60

== Bowl games ==
Bowl game	Winning team		Losing team	
Rose Bowl	No. 2 Georgia	9	No. 13 UCLA	0
Sugar Bowl	No. 7 Tennessee	14	No. 4 Tulsa	7
Orange Bowl	No. 10 Alabama	37	No. 8 Boston College	21
Cotton Bowl Classic	No. 11 Texas	14	No. 5 Georgia Tech	7
Sun Bowl	Second Air Force	13	Hardin–Simmons	7

== Statistical leaders ==
=== Team leaders ===
==== Total offense ====
Rank	Team	Games played	Yards gained	Yards per game	First downs
1	Georgia	11	4725	429.5	186
2	Tulsa	10	4261	426.1	165
3	Boston College	9	3697	410.8	137
4	Ohio State	10	3975	397.5	152
5	Missouri	12	4272	356.0	169
6	Hardin-Simmons	9	3130	347.8	124
6	Iowa Pre-Flight	10	3356	335.6	133
7	Georgia Tech	10	3304	330.4	136
9	Indiana	10	3301	330.1	154
10	Texas	10	3205	320.5	148

==== Total defense ====
Rank	Team	Games played	Yards gained	Yards per game	1st downs
1	Texas	10	1173	117.3	63
2	Miami	9	1154	128.2	66
3	Boston College	9	1186	131.8	72
4	William & Mary	11	1516	137.8	77
5	North Carolina Pre-Flight	10	1428	142.8	87
6	Tennessee	10	1435	143.5	75
7	Minnesota	9	1314	146.0	67
8	Tulsa	10	1487	148.7	70
9	Holy Cross	10	1494	149.4	61
10	Great Lakes Navy	12	1917	159.8	91

==== Rushing offense ====
Rank	Team	Games	Rushes	Yards gained	Yards per game
1	Hardin-Simmons	9	508	2767	307.4
2	Boston College	9	538	2635	292.8
3	Ohio State	10	571	2833	283.3
4	Missouri	12	597	3230	269.2
5	Texas	10	532	2496	249.6
6	Iowa Pre-Flight	10	515	2493	249.3
7	Auburn	9	500	2223	247.0
8	Great Lakes Navy	12	619	2906	242.2
9	Penn	9	518	2162	240.2
10	Georgia	11	491	2624	238.5

==== Rushing defense ====
Rank	Team	Games	Rushes	Yards gained	Yards per game
1	Boston College	9	294	440	48.9
2	Texas	10	306	575	57.5
3	William & Mary	11	329	734	66.7
4	Alabama	10	329	743	74.3
5	Tennessee	10	347	760	76.0

==== Passing offense ====
Rank	Team	Games	Att.	Compl.	Int.	Pct. Compl.	Yards	Yds/Game	Yds/Attempt
1	Tulsa	10	245	138	9	.563	2339	233.9	9.55
2	Georgia	11	245	122	18	.498	2101	191.0	8.58
3	Columbia	9	199	96	21	.482	1661	184.6	8.35
4	Creighton	9	157	78	13	.497	1393	154.8	8.87
5	Maryland	9	170	90	15	.529	1364	151.6	8.02

==== Passing defense ====
Rank	Team	Games	Att.	Compl.	Pct. Compl.	Yards	Yds/Game
1	Harvard	9	81	29	.358	409	45.4
1	Texas Mines	8	105	40	.381	363	45.4
3	Miami	9	115	46	.400	437	48.6
3	Penn State	8	93	32	.344	389	48.6
5	South Carolina	9	99	32	.323	453	50.3

==== Scoring ====
Rank	Team	Games	Points	Pts/Game
1	Tulsa	11	434	39.5
2	Ohio State	10	337	33.7
3	Georgia	12	376	31.3
4	Boston College	10	282	28.2
5	Colorado	9	251	27.9
6	Indiana	10	256	25.6
7	Missouri	12	288	24.0
8	Tennessee	11	259	23.5
9	Oklahoma A&M	10	235	23.5
10	Vanderbilt	10	232	23.2

=== Individual leaders ===
==== Total offense ====
Rank	Player	Team	Games	Plays	Rush yds	Pass yds	Total Yds	Avg gain per play
1	Frank Sinkwich	Georgia	11	341	795	1392	2187	6.41
2	Paul Governali	Columbia	9	268	168	1442	1610	6.01
3	Bob Steuber	Missouri	12	199	1098	356	1454	7.31
4	Glenn Dobbs	Tulsa	10	179	361	1066	1427	7.97
5	Ray Evans	Kansas	10	311	293	1117	1410	4.53
6	Billy Hillenbrand	Indiana	10	239	480	877	1357	5.68
7	Bruce Smith	Great Lakes Navy	12	245	849	486	1335	5.45
8	Otto Graham	Northwestern	10	318	235	1092	1327	4.17
9	Dutton	Pittsburgh	9	303	675	610	1285	4.24
10	Rudy Mobley	Hardin-Simmons	9	187	1281	0	1281	6.85

==== Rushing ====
Rank	Player	Team	Games	Rushes	Net Yds	Avg Gain per Play
1	Rudy Mobley	Hardin-Simmons	9	187	1281	6.85
2	Bob Steuber	Missouri	12	149	1098	7.37
3	Camp Wilson	Hardin-Simmons	9	196	981	5.01
4	Mike Holowak	Boston College	9	174	965	5.55
5	Gene Fekete	Ohio State	10	185	910	4.92
6	Bruce Smith	Great Lakes Navy	12	144	849	5.90
7	Bob Kennedy	Washington State	10	226	813	3.60
8	Frank Sinkwich	Georgia	11	175	795	4.54
9	Elroy Hirsch	Wisconsin	10	141	767	5.44
10	Roy McKay	Texas	10	132	701	5.31

==== Passing ====
Rank	Player	Team	Games	Att.	Compl.	Int.	Pct. Compl.	Yds.
1	Ray Evans	Kansas	10	200	101	9	.505	1117
2	Otto Graham	Northwestern	10	182	89	18	.489	1092
3	Paul Governali	Columbia	9	165	87	18	.527	1442
4	Frank Sinkwich	Georgia	11	166	84	7	.506	1392
5	Turnbull Gillette	Virginia	9	144	82	14	.569	920
6	Angelo Bertelli	Notre Dame	11	162	72	16	.444	1039
7	Clark	Texas Mines	9	136	71	12	.522	846
8	Glenn Dobbs	Tulsa	10	107	67	4	.626	1066
9	Tommy Mont	Maryland	9	127	66	12	.520	1076
10	Emery Nix±	TCU	10	154	66	9	.429	672

== See also ==
- 1942 College Football All-America Team
- List of World War II military service football teams
