= Henry Mazur =

American football player and military officer (1919–1988)

Profile
- Position: Halfback

Personal information
- Born: November 19, 1919; Lowell, Massachusetts, U.S.
- Died: March 26, 1988 (aged 68); Nashua, New Hampshire, U.S.

Career information
- High school: Lowell (MA)
- College: Army

Awards and highlights
- Second-team All-American (1942); First-team All-Eastern (1942); Second-team All-Eastern (1941)

Henry J. Mazur (November 19, 1919 - March 26, 1988) was a college football player and military officer. He played for the Army Cadets football team and was selected by the International News Service as a second-team halfback on the 1942 College Football All-America Team.

== Early life ==
Mazur was born in Lowell, Massachusetts, the son of Stanley and Katherine (Clehowicz) Mazur. He attended St. Stanislaus school until 1933 when he enrolled at Lowell High School. While at Lowell, he was an outstanding athlete, playing baseball, football, basketball and track. He was selected as an all-state halfback in 1936 and also played for an American Legion baseball team that won the New England championship. He graduated from high school in 1937 and, during the 1937-1938 academic year, studied at Stanton Preparatory Academy at Cornwall, New York.

== College career ==
In the fall of 1938, Mazur enrolled at Boston College where he played freshman football. In January 1939, he was appointed to the United States Military Academy. He played at the halfback position for the Army Cadets football team and was elected captain of the 1942 Army football team. He was selected by the International News Service as a second-team player on the 1942 College Football All-America Team. While at the Academy, Mazur also trained as a fighter pilot at Stewart Air Base.

== Military service ==
Mazur graduated from the Academy in 1943 and became a pilot during World War II. He flew a P-47 Thunderbolt with the Ninth Air Force in the European Theater. He was a squadron commander with a unit known as the "Panzer Dusters", flying 85 missions with over 200 hours of combat. He was credited with shooting down three German aircraft and damaging three others.

Mazur remained in the Air Force until 1969, retiring with the rank of colonel. His assignments included head of the Air Defense Command Computer Programming and Systems office in Santa Monica, California; Commander of Aircraft Control and Warning Squadron at Murphy Dome Air Force Station in Alaska; Systems Program Director and Division Chief of the Command and Control Management Systems of the Deputate of the Space Defense Command of the Air Force at Hanscom Field in Massachusetts. While serving in the Air Force, he also pursued graduate studies in geopolitics and education at Columbia University and the University of California.

== Later life ==
After retiring from the Air Force, Mazur returned to Lowell, Massachusetts, and served with the admissions office at the University of Lowell. He died in 1988 in Nashua, New Hampshire.
