= 1942 Fordham Rams football team =

American college football season

1942 Fordham Rams football
- Conference: Independent
- Record: 5–3–1
- Head coach: Earl Walsh (1st season)
- Home stadium: Polo Grounds

1942 Eastern college football independents records
	Conf.			Overall
Team	W	L	T	W		L		T
Williams		–		7	–	1	–	0
No. 19 Penn State		–		6	–	1	–	1
No. 8 Boston College		–		8	–	2	–	0
Buffalo		–		6	–	2	–	0
Bucknell		–		6	–	2	–	1
Colgate		–		6	–	2	–	1
Army		–		6	–	3	–	0
Syracuse		–		6	–	3	–	0
Duquesne		–		6	–	3	–	1
Yale		–		5	–	3	–	0
Fordham		–		5	–	3	–	1
Penn		–		5	–	3	–	1
No. T–19 Holy Cross		–		5	–	4	–	1
Dartmouth		–		5	–	4	–	0
Brown		–		4	–	4	–	0
Villanova		–		4	–	4	–	0
Vermont		–		4	–	3	–	0
Carnegie Tech		–		3	–	3	–	0
Boston University		–		4	–	5	–	0
Cornell		–		3	–	5	–	1
Princeton		–		3	–	5	–	1
Temple		–		2	–	5	–	3
Columbia		–		3	–	6	–	0
Pittsburgh		–		3	–	6	–	0
Tufts		–		2	–	5	–	1
Franklin & Marshall		–		1	–	4	–	2
Massachusetts State		–		2	–	5	–	0
Harvard		–		2	–	6	–	1
Manhattan		–		2	–	6	–	0
CCNY		–		1	–	7	–	1
Rankings from AP Poll

The 1942 Fordham Rams football team represented Fordham University as an independent during the 1942 college football season. The Rams offense scored 103 points while the defense (due to two separate defensive collapses) allowed 155 points. Although the Rams bounced back from those losses and ended the season with a winning record, the team finished the year unranked.

This marked the first time Fordham had finished unranked since sports writers began polling in 1935. Previously, Fordham had finished 11th in the 1935 season ending UP poll, 15th in the 1936 season ending AP poll, third in 1937, 15th in 1938, 17th in 1939, 12th in 1940, and sixth in the 1941 season-ending AP poll. Only Duke had finished each of the previous seasons ranked and they too finished the 1942 season unranked. The Rams were ranked at No. 54 (out of 590 college and military teams) in the final rankings under the Litkenhous Difference by Score System for 1942.

After the season, Fordham put their football program on hiatus for the duration of World War II.

== Schedule ==
Date	Opponent	Site	Result	Attendance	Source
September 26	at Purdue	Ross–Ade Stadium; West Lafayette, IN	W 14–7	20,000	
October 3	at Tennessee	Shield-Watkins Field; Knoxville, TN	L 14–40	25,000	
October 10	North Carolina	Polo Grounds; New York, NY	T 0–0	19,500	
October 17	West Virginia	Polo Grounds; New York, NY	W 23–14	12,300	
October 31	Saint Mary's	Polo Grounds; New York, NY	W 7–0	25,300	
November 7	LSU	Polo Grounds; New York, NY	L 13–26	16,400	
November 14	at No. 3 Boston College	Fenway Park; Boston, MA	L 6–56	35,000	
November 21	Missouri	Polo Grounds; New York, NY	W 20–12	11,000	
November 28	vs. North Carolina Pre-Flight	Yankee Stadium; Bronx, NY	W 6–0	24,500	
Rankings from AP Poll released prior to the game
