= 1942 Bowling Green Falcons football team =

American college football season

1942 Bowling Green Falcons football
- Conference: Ohio Athletic Conference
- Record: 6–2–1 (1–1–1 OAC)
- Head coach: Robert Whittaker (2nd season)
- Captain: Ralph Quesinberry
- Home stadium: Doyt Perry Stadium

1942 Ohio Athletic Conference football standings
	Conf.					Overall
Team	W		L		T	W		L		T
Ohio Northern $	5	–	0	–	1	6	–	1	–	1
John Carroll	3	–	0	–	1	3	–	2	–	3
Toledo	1	–	0	–	1	4	–	4	–	1
Denison	4	–	1	–	1	6	–	2	–	1
Oberlin	2	–	1	–	0	5	–	1	–	1
Baldwin–Wallace	2	–	1	–	0	6	–	2	–	0
Otterbein	4	–	2	–	0	5	–	3	–	0
Kent State	2	–	1	–	0	5	–	3	–	0
Wooster	5	–	3	–	0	6	–	3	–	0
Bowling Green	1	–	1	–	1	6	–	2	–	1
Findlay	2	–	3	–	1	5	–	4	–	1
Heidelberg	2	–	3	–	0	4	–	4	–	0
Case	1	–	2	–	0	4	–	4	–	0
Capital	1	–	3	–	0	3	–	4	–	0
Muskingum	1	–	4	–	0	3	–	4	–	2
Wittenberg	1	–	4	–	1	1	–	5	–	1
Kenyon	0	–	2	–	0	5	–	2	–	0
Mount Union	0	–	6	–	0	1	–	6	–	0
$ – Conference champion

The 1942 Bowling Green Falcons football team was an American football team that represented Bowling Green State College (later renamed Bowling Green State University) as a member of the Ohio Athletic Conference (OAC) during the 1942 college football season. In their second season under head coach Robert Whittaker, the Falcons compiled an overall record 6–2–1 with a mark of 1–1–1 in conference play, placing ninth in the OAC, and outscored opponents by a total of 135 to 55. Ralph Quesinberry was the team captain.

Bowling Green was ranked at No. 231 (out of 590 college and military teams) in the final rankings under the Litkenhous Difference by Score System for 1942.

The team played its home games at University Stadium in Bowling Green, Ohio.

== Schedule ==
Date	Opponent	Site	Result	Attendance	Source
September 26	Miami Naval*	University Stadium; Bowling Green, OH	W 39–0		
October 3	at Ohio Wesleyan*	Delaware, OH	L 14–15		
October 10	at Ball State*	University Stadium; Bowling Green, OH	W 26–14		
October 17	at Wayne*	University of Detroit Stadium; Detroit, MI	W 20–6		
October 24	Miami (OH)*	University Stadium; Bowling Green, OH	W 7–6		
October 31	Kent State	University Stadium; Bowling Green, OH (rivalry)	L 0–7	2,500	
November 7	Wittenberg	University Stadium; Bowling Green, OH	W 10–0		
November 13	at Findlay	Findlay, OH	T 0–0		
November 21	Grosse Isle Navy*	University Stadium; Bowling Green, OH	W 19–7		
*Non-conference game
