= 1942 Arkansas Razorbacks football team =

American college football season

1942 Arkansas Razorbacks football
- Conference: Southwest Conference
- Record: 3–7 (0–6 SWC)
- Head coach: George Cole (1st season)
- Captains: Harry Wynne; Robert Forte
- Home stadium: Razorback Stadium

1942 Southwest Conference football standings
	Conf.					Overall
Team	W		L		T	W		L		T
No. 11 Texas $	5	–	1	–	0	9	–	2	–	0
Rice	4	–	1	–	1	7	–	2	–	1
TCU	4	–	2	–	0	7	–	3	–	0
Baylor	3	–	2	–	1	6	–	4	–	1
Texas A&M	2	–	3	–	1	4	–	5	–	1
SMU	1	–	4	–	1	3	–	6	–	2
Arkansas	0	–	6	–	0	3	–	7	–	0
Rankings from AP Poll

The 1942 Arkansas Razorbacks football team represented the University of Arkansas in the Southwest Conference (SWC) during the 1942 college football season. In their first and only year under head coach George Cole, the Razorbacks compiled a 3–7 record (0–6 against SWC opponents), finished in last place in the SWC, and were outscored by their opponents by a combined total of 228 to 89.

Arkansas was ranked at No. 115 (out of 590 college and military teams) in the final rankings under the Litkenhous Difference by Score System for 1942.

== Schedule ==
Date	Opponent	Site	Result	Attendance	Source
September 26	Wichita*	Razorback Stadium; Fayetteville, AR	W 27–0	2,500	
October 3	at TCU	Amon G. Carter Stadium; Fort Worth, TX	L 6–13		
October 10	Baylor	Razorback Stadium; Fayetteville, AR	L 7–20		
October 17	No. 20 Texas	Quigley Stadium; Little Rock, AR (rivalry)	L 6–47	8,000	
October 24	vs. Ole Miss*	Crump Stadium; Memphis, TN (rivalry)	W 7–6	15,000	
October 31	at Texas A&M	Kyle Field; College Station, TX (rivalry)	L 0–41		
November 7	Rice^{†}	Razorback Stadium; Fayetteville, AR	L 9–40	4,000	
November 14	at SMU	Ownby Stadium; University Park, TX	L 6–14		
November 21	at Detroit*	University of Detroit Stadium; Detroit, MI	W 14–7	5,153	
November 26	at No. 6 Tulsa*	Skelly Field; Tulsa, OK	L 7–40	17,000–18,000	
*Non-conference game; ^{†}Homecoming; Rankings from AP Poll released prior to the game
