= List of Border Conference football champions =

Border Conference football champions (defunct)
- Map of Border Conference member states
- Sport: College football
- Conference: Border Conference
- Played: 1931–1961
- Most championships: Texas Tech (9)

The list of Border Conference football champions includes eight teams that won the college football championship awarded by the defunct Border Conference during its existence from 1931 through 1961. In total, 9 teams sponsored football in the conference. Arizona State Teacher's College of Flagstaff (now Northern Arizona University) was the only member to never win a Border Conference football championship.

== Champions by year ==
| Year | School | Record |
|---|---|---|
| 1931 | Arizona State | 3–0 |
| 1932 | No champion (Note: Arizona has been listed by some as conference champion for the 1945 season and Texas Tech has been listed by some as conference champion for the years 1932, 1933, 1934 and 1944, but Border Intercollegiate Athletic Association rules forbade an official conference championship being awarded to a team without a minimum of three games played between conference members.) | N/A |
| 1933 | No champion | N/A |
| 1934 | No champion | N/A |
| 1935 | Arizona | 4–0 |
| 1936 | Arizona | 3–0 |
| 1937 | Texas Tech | 3–0 |
| 1938 | New Mexico; New Mexico A&M | 4–2 (Note: Texas Tech won its two conference games in 1938 but did not win the official championship since it did not meet the conference's three-game requirement. Its victory over New Mexico did not count toward the championship, permitting New Mexico to share the 1938 Border Conference championship with New Mexico A&M.); 4–1 |
| 1939 | Arizona State | 4–0 |
| 1940 | Arizona State | 3–0–1 |
| 1941 | Arizona | 5–0 |
| 1942 | Hardin–Simmons; Texas Tech | 3–0–1; 3–0–1 |
| 1943 | No full conference program | N/A |
| 1944 | No full conference program | N/A |
| 1945 | No full conference program | N/A |
| 1946 | Hardin–Simmons | 6–0 |
| 1947 | Texas Tech | 4–0 |
| 1948 | Texas Tech | 5–0 |
| 1949 | Texas Tech | 5–0 |
| 1950 | West Texas State | 6–0 |
| 1951 | Texas Tech | 5–0 |
| 1952 | Arizona State | 4–0 |
| 1953 | Texas Tech | 5–0 |
| 1954 | Texas Tech | 4–0 |
| 1955 | Texas Tech | 3–0 |
| 1956 | Texas Western | 5–0 |
| 1957 | Arizona State | 4–0 |
| 1958 | Hardin–Simmons | 4–0 |
| 1959 | Arizona State | 5–0 |
| 1960 | New Mexico State | 4–0 |
| 1961 | Arizona State | 3–0 |

== Championships by team ==
| Team | Championships | Years |
|---|---|---|
| Texas Tech | 9 | 1937, 1942†, 1947, 1948, 1949, 1951, 1953, 1954, 1955 |
| Arizona State | 7 | 1931, 1939, 1940, 1952, 1957, 1959, 1961 |
| Arizona | 3 | 1935, 1936, 1941 |
| Hardin–Simmons | 3 | 1942†, 1946, 1958 |
| New Mexico A&M/State | 2 | 1938†, 1960 |
| New Mexico | 1 | 1938† |
| Texas Western | 1 | 1956 |
| West Texas State | 1 | 1950 |

- "†" Denotes shared title
