= Clark Jarnagin =

American football and basketball coach (1914–1979)

Clark Jarnigan
Biographical details
- Born: May 24, 1914; Graham, Texas, U.S.
- Died: October 19, 1979 (aged 65); Abilene, Texas, U.S.

Playing career

Football
- 1933–1936: Hardin–Simmons
- Position: Center

Coaching career (HC unless noted)

Football
- 1937: Hardin–Simmons (freshmen)
- 1938: Denton HS (TX)
- 1939–1942: Hardin–Simmons (line)
- 1942: Hardin–Simmons (interim HC)
- 1943–1944: North Carolina Pre-Flight (line)
- 1946: Baylor (line)
- 1947–1957: West Texas State (line)
- 1958–1959: West Texas State

Basketball
- 1942–1943: Hardin–Simmons

Head coaching record
- Overall: 2–19 (college football); 1–9 (college basketball)
- Bowls: 0–1

William Clark Jarnagin (May 24, 1914 – October 19, 1979) was an American football and basketball coach. He served as the interim head football coach at Hardin–Simmons University during the 1943 Sun Bowl. Jarnigan was the head football coach at West Texas State University—now known as West Texas A&M University—from 1958 to 1959. He was also the head basketball coach at Hardin–Simmons during the 1942–43 season.

== Head coaching record ==
=== College football ===
Year	Team	Overall	Conference	Standing	Bowl/playoffs
Hardin–Simmons Cowboys (Border Conference) (1942)
1942	Hardin–Simmons	0–1 (Note: Warren B. Woodson was the head coach for Hardin–Simmons for the regular season before going into the service with the United States Navy. He led the Cowboys to an overall record of 9–0–1 with a mark of 4–0–1 in conference play, sharing the Border Conference title with Texas Tech. Jarnagin was appointed interim head coach for the 1943 Sun Bowl.)			L Sun
Hardin–Simmons:		0–1			
West Texas State Buffaloes (Border Conference) (1958–1959)
1958	West Texas State	1–9	1–4	T–5th	
1959	West Texas State	1–9	0–5	6th	
West Texas State:		2–18	1–9		
Total:		2–19			
