= 1942 Arizona Wildcats football team =

American college football season

1942 Arizona Wildcats football
- Conference: Border Conference
- Record: 6–4 (4–2 Border)
- Head coach: Mike Casteel (4th season)
- Captain: Murl M. McCain Jr.
- Home stadium: Arizona Stadium

1942 Border Conference football standings
	Conf.					Overall
Team	W		L		T	W		L		T
Hardin–Simmons +	4	–	0	–	1	9	–	1	–	1
Texas Tech +	3	–	0	–	1	4	–	5	–	1
West Texas State	5	–	2	–	0	7	–	2	–	0
Arizona	4	–	2	–	0	6	–	4	–	0
Texas Mines	4	–	3	–	0	5	–	4	–	0
New Mexico	3	–	4	–	0	4	–	5	–	2
Arizona State	2	–	5	–	0	2	–	8	–	0
Arizona State–Flagstaff	1	–	4	–	0	1	–	5	–	0
New Mexico A&M	0	–	6	–	0	1	–	8	–	0
+ – Conference co-champions

The 1942 Arizona Wildcats football team represented the University of Arizona in the Border Conference during the 1942 college football season. In their fourth season under head coach Mike Casteel, the Wildcats compiled a 6–4 record (4–2 against Border opponents), finished in fourth place in the conference, and outscored their opponents, 189 to 139. The team captain was Murl M. McCain, Jr.

Arizona was ranked at No. 98 (out of 590 college and military teams) in the final rankings under the Litkenhous Difference by Score System for 1942.

The team played its home games in Arizona Stadium in Tucson, Arizona.

== Schedule ==
Date	Opponent	Site	Result	Attendance	Source
September 26	New Mexico A&M	Arizona Stadium; Tucson, AZ	W 53–0	8,500	
October 3	Utah*	Arizona Stadium; Tucson, AZ	W 14–0	9,000	
October 10	at Arizona State	Goodwin Stadium; Tempe, AZ (rivalry)	W 23–0		
October 17	Oklahoma A&M*	Arizona Stadium; Tucson, AZ	W 20–6		
October 24	at Marquette*	Marquette Stadium; Milwaukee, WI	L 0–39	18,000	
October 31	Hardin–Simmons	Arizona Stadium; Tucson, AZ	L 26–34	7,500	
November 7	New Mexico	Arizona Stadium; Tucson, AZ (rivalry)	W 14–13		
November 14	at Texas Mines	Kidd Field; El Paso, TX	W 19–7		
November 26	Texas Tech	Arizona Stadium; Tucson, AZ	L 7–13	8,000	
December 5	Second Air Force*	Arizona Stadium; Tucson, AZ	L 13–27	> 7,500	
*Non-conference game
