= 1942 Detroit Titans football team =

American college football season

1942 Detroit Titans football
- Conference: Independent
- Record: 5–4
- Head coach: Gus Dorais (18th season)
- Captains: Joseph Gensheimer; Donald Hughes
- Home stadium: University of Detroit Stadium

1942 Midwestern college football independents records
	Conf.			Overall
Team	W	L	T	W		L		T
Central Michigan		–		6	–	0	–	0
Western Michigan		–		5	–	1	–	0
Cincinnati		–		8	–	2	–	0
Dayton		–		8	–	2	–	0
Marquette		–		7	–	2	–	0
No. 6 Notre Dame		–		7	–	2	–	2
Ohio		–		5	–	3	–	0
Detroit		–		5	–	4	–	0
Wichita		–		5	–	4	–	0
Michigan State		–		4	–	3	–	2
Michigan State Normal		–		3	–	3	–	1
Ohio Wesleyan		–		4	–	4	–	0
Xavier		–		4	–	5	–	0
Carthage		–		3	–	4	–	0
Miami (OH)		–		3	–	6	–	0
Wayne		–		1	–	6	–	1
Akron		–		0	–	7	–	2
Michigan Tech		–		0	–	3	–	0
Rankings from AP Poll

The 1942 Detroit Titans football team represented the University of Detroit as an independent during the 1942 college football season. Detroit outscored its opponents by a combined total of 82 to 66 and finished with a 5–4 record in its 18th and final year under head coach and College Football Hall of Fame inductee, Gus Dorais.

In addition to head coach Gus Dorais, the team's coaching staff included Lloyd Brazil (backfield coach), Bud Boeringer (line coach), Edmund J. Barbour (freshman coach), and Michael H. "Dad" Butler (trainer). Quarterback Donald Hughes and end Joseph Gensheimer were the team's co-captains.

Detroit was ranked at No. 85 (out of 590 college and military teams) in the final rankings under the Litkenhous Difference by Score System for 1942.

== Schedule ==
Date	Opponent	Site	Result	Attendance	Source
October 2	Wayne	University of Detroit Stadium; Detroit, MI	W 27–0	15,670	
October 11	Fort Knox	University of Detroit Stadium; Detroit, MI	W 16–0	18,351	
October 18	at Manhattan	Polo Grounds; New York, NY	W 21–7	12,500	
October 24	Georgetown	University of Detroit Stadium; Detroit, MI	W 6–0		
November 1	at Marquette	Marquette Stadium; Milwaukee, WI	L 0–10	7,000	
November 15	Villanova	University of Detroit Stadium; Detroit, MI	W 9–0	11,755	
November 21	Arkansas	University of Detroit Stadium; Detroit, MI	L 7–14	5,153	
November 28	Oklahoma A&M	University of Detroit Stadium; Detroit, MI	L 6–33	< 5,000	
December 6	at Saint Mary's	Kezar Stadium; San Francisco, CA	L 0–2	500	
