= 1942 Marshall Thundering Herd football team =

American college football season

1942 Marshall Thundering Herd football
- Conference: West Virginia Intercollegiate Athletic Conference
- Record: 1–7–1 (0–1 WVIAC)
- Head coach: Cam Henderson (8th season)
- Captains: Sam Clagg; Paul McCuskey
- Home stadium: Fairfield Stadium

1942 West Virginia Intercollegiate Athletic Conference football standings
	Conf.					Overall
Team	W		L		T	W		L		T
Morris Harvey $	4	–	0	–	0	6	–	1	–	2
West Liberty State	4	–	1	–	0	5	–	3	–	0
Glenville State	4	–	2	–	0	4	–	2	–	0
Fairmont State	3	–	4	–	0	3	–	4	–	0
Potomac State	0	–	4	–	0	1	–	8	–	0
Bethany (WV) *	1	–	2	–	0	6	–	2	–	0
Marshall *	0	–	1	–	0	8	–	2	–	0
West Virginia Tech *	0	–	2	–	0	0	–	2	–	4
$ – Conference champion; * – Did not qualify for conference standings Ties did not count in conference standings.

The 1942 Marshall Thundering Herd football team was an American football team that represented Marshall University as a member of the West Virginia Intercollegiate Athletic Conference during the 1942 college football season. In its eighth season under head coach Cam Henderson, the Thundering Herd compiled a 1–7–1 record and was outscored by a total of 118 to 52. Marshall had a record of 0–1 against WVIAC opponents, but did not play enough conference games to qualify for the WVAC standings. Sam Clagg and Paul McCuskey were the team captains.

Marshall was ranked at No. 209 (out of 590 college and military teams) in the final rankings under the Litkenhous Difference by Score System for 1942.

== Schedule ==
Date	Opponent	Site	Result	Attendance	Source
September 27	Morehead State*	Fairfield Stadium; Huntington, WV	T 0–0		
October 3	at Kentucky Wesleyan*	Owensboro, KY	L 13–19		
October 9	at Louisiana Tech*	Tech Stadium; Ruston, LA	L 0–26		
October 17	Fort Knox*	Fairfield Stadium; Huntington, WV	L 6–20		
October 24	at Toledo*	Swayne Field; Toledo, OH	L 0–7		
October 31	at Dayton*	UD Stadium; Dayton, OH	L 13–20	6,500	
November 7	at Xavier*	Corcoran Stadium; Cincinnati, OH	L 7–13		
November 13	Morris Harvey	Fairfield Stadium; Huntington, WV	L 0–6		
November 26	Bradley*^{†}	Fairfield Stadium; Huntington, WV	W 13–7		
*Non-conference game; ^{†}Homecoming
