= 1942 TCU Horned Frogs football team =

American college football season

1942 TCU Horned Frogs football
- Conference: Southwest Conference
- Record: 7–3 (4–2 SWC)
- Head coach: Dutch Meyer (9th season)
- Offensive scheme: Meyer spread
- Home stadium: Amon G. Carter Stadium

1942 Southwest Conference football standings
	Conf.					Overall
Team	W		L		T	W		L		T
No. 11 Texas $	5	–	1	–	0	9	–	2	–	0
Rice	4	–	1	–	1	7	–	2	–	1
TCU	4	–	2	–	0	7	–	3	–	0
Baylor	3	–	2	–	1	6	–	4	–	1
Texas A&M	2	–	3	–	1	4	–	5	–	1
SMU	1	–	4	–	1	3	–	6	–	2
Arkansas	0	–	6	–	0	3	–	7	–	0
Rankings from AP Poll

The 1942 TCU Horned Frogs football team represented Texas Christian University (TCU) in the 1942 college football season. The Horned Frogs finished the season 7–3 overall and 4–2 in the Southwest Conference. The team was coached by Dutch Meyer in his ninth year as head coach.

TCU was ranked at No. 46 (out of 590 college and military teams) in the final rankings under the Litkenhous Difference by Score System for 1942.

The Frogs played their home games in Amon G. Carter Stadium, which is located on campus in Fort Worth, Texas.

== Schedule ==
Date	Opponent	Rank	Site	Result	Attendance	Source
September 25	at UCLA*		Los Angeles Memorial Coliseum; Los Angeles, CA	W 7–6	15,000	
October 3	Arkansas		Amon G. Carter Stadium; Fort Worth, TX	W 13–6		
October 10	Kansas*		Amon G. Carter Stadium; Fort Worth, TX	W 41–6		
October 17	at Texas A&M	No. 17	Kyle Field; College Station, TX (rivalry)	W 7–2	14,000	
October 24	at Pensacola NAS*	No. 12	Air Station Field; Pensacola, FL	W 21–0	5,000	
October 31	Baylor	No. 9	Amon G. Carter Stadium; Fort Worth, TX (rivalry)	L 7–10	12,000	
November 7	at Texas Tech*		Tech Field; Lubbock, TX (rivalry)	L 6–13	10,000	
November 14	No. 8 Texas		Amon G. Carter Stadium; Fort Worth, TX (rivalry)	W 13–7	18,000	
November 21	at Rice	No. 18	Rice Field; Houston, TX	L 0–26	14,000	
November 28	at SMU		Ownby Stadium; University Park, TX (rivalry)	W 14–6	10,000	
*Non-conference game; Rankings from AP Poll released prior to the game

== Rankings ==
Ranking movements Legend: ██ Increase in ranking ██ Decrease in ranking — = Not ranked т = Tied with team above or below
	Week							
Poll	1	2	3	4	5	6	7	Final
AP	17	12	9	—	—	18т	—	—
