= 1942 Texas Longhorns football team =

American college football season

1942 Texas Longhorns football

SWC champion Cotton Bowl Classic champion

Cotton Bowl Classic, W 14–7 vs. Georgia Tech
- Conference: Southwest Conference

Ranking
- AP: No. 11
- Record: 9–2 (5–1 SWC)
- Head coach: Dana X. Bible (6th season)
- Home stadium: War Memorial Stadium

1942 Southwest Conference football standings
	Conf.					Overall
Team	W		L		T	W		L		T
No. 11 Texas $	5	–	1	–	0	9	–	2	–	0
Rice	4	–	1	–	1	7	–	2	–	1
TCU	4	–	2	–	0	7	–	3	–	0
Baylor	3	–	2	–	1	6	–	4	–	1
Texas A&M	2	–	3	–	1	4	–	5	–	1
SMU	1	–	4	–	1	3	–	6	–	2
Arkansas	0	–	6	–	0	3	–	7	–	0
Rankings from AP Poll

The 1942 Texas Longhorns football team was an American football team that represented the University of Texas (now known as the University of Texas at Austin) as a member of the Southwest Conference (SWC) during the 1942 college football season. In their sixth year under head coach Dana X. Bible, the Longhorns compiled an overall record of 9–2, with a mark of 5–1 in conference play, and finished as SWC champion. Texas concluded their season with a victory over Georgia Tech in the Cotton Bowl Classic.

== Schedule ==
Date	Opponent	Rank	Site	Result	Attendance	Source
September 19	Corpus Christi NAS*		War Memorial Stadium; Austin, TX	W 40–0	7,500	
September 26	Kansas State*		War Memorial Stadium; Austin, TX	W 64–0	15,000	
October 3	at Northwestern*		Dyche Stadium; Evanston, IL	L 0–3	43,000	
October 10	vs. Oklahoma*		Cotton Bowl; Dallas, TX (rivalry)	W 7–0	20,000	
October 17	at Arkansas	No. 20	Quigley Stadium; Little Rock, AR (rivalry)	W 47–6	8,000	
October 24	at Rice	No. 15	Rice Field; Houston, TX (rivalry)	W 12–7	28,000	
October 31	SMU	No. 17	War Memorial Stadium; Austin, TX	W 21–7		
November 7	Baylor	No. 14	War Memorial Stadium; Austin, TX (rivalry)	W 20–0	25,000	
November 14	at TCU	No. 8	Amon G. Carter Stadium; Fort Worth, TX (rivalry)	L 7–13	18,000	
November 26	Texas A&M	No. 18	War Memorial Stadium; Austin, TX (rivalry)	W 12–6	43,000	
January 1, 1943	vs. No. 5 Georgia Tech*	No. 11	Cotton Bowl; Dallas, TX (Cotton Bowl Classic)	W 14–7	36,620	
*Non-conference game; Rankings from AP Poll released prior to the game

== Rankings ==
Ranking movements Legend: ██ Increase in ranking ██ Decrease in ranking т = Tied with team above or below
	Week							
Poll	1	2	3	4	5	6	7	Final
AP	20	15	17	14	8	14т	18	11

== Awards and honors ==
- Jack Freeman, Cotton Bowl co-Most Valuable Player
- Roy McKay, Cotton Bowl co-Most Valuable Player
- Stanley Mauldin, Cotton Bowl co-Most Valuable Player
