= 1942 Michigan State Spartans football team =

American college football season

1942 Michigan State Spartans football
- Conference: Independent
- Record: 4–3–2
- Head coach: Charlie Bachman (10th season)
- Offensive scheme: Notre Dame Box
- MVP: Richard Kieppe
- Captains: Richard Mangrum; Walter L. Pawlowski
- Home stadium: Macklin Field

1942 Midwestern college football independents records
	Conf.			Overall
Team	W	L	T	W		L		T
Central Michigan		–		6	–	0	–	0
Western Michigan		–		5	–	1	–	0
Cincinnati		–		8	–	2	–	0
Dayton		–		8	–	2	–	0
Marquette		–		7	–	2	–	0
No. 6 Notre Dame		–		7	–	2	–	2
Ohio		–		5	–	3	–	0
Detroit		–		5	–	4	–	0
Wichita		–		5	–	4	–	0
Michigan State		–		4	–	3	–	2
Michigan State Normal		–		3	–	3	–	1
Ohio Wesleyan		–		4	–	4	–	0
Xavier		–		4	–	5	–	0
Carthage		–		3	–	4	–	0
Miami (OH)		–		3	–	6	–	0
Wayne		–		1	–	6	–	1
Akron		–		0	–	7	–	2
Michigan Tech		–		0	–	3	–	0
Rankings from AP Poll

The 1942 Michigan State Spartans football team represented Michigan State College as an independent during the 1942 college football season. In their tenth season under head coach Charlie Bachman, the Spartans compiled a 4–3–2 record and lost their annual rivalry game with Michigan by a 20 to 0 score. In inter-sectional play, the team played both Temple and Oregon State to 7–7 ties, lost to Washington State (25–13), and defeated West Virginia (7–0).

Michigan State was ranked at No. 49 (out of 590 college and military teams) in the final rankings under the Litkenhous Difference by Score System for 1942.

== Schedule ==
Date	Opponent	Site	Result	Attendance	Source
October 3	at Michigan	Michigan Stadium; Ann Arbor, MI (rivalry)	L 0–20	39,163	
October 10	Wayne	Macklin Field; East Lansing, MI	W 46–6		
October 17	Marquette	Macklin Field; East Lansing, MI	L 7–28		
October 24	Great Lakes Navy^{†}	Macklin Field; East Lansing, MI	W 14–0		
October 31	at Temple	Temple Stadium; Philadelphia, PA	T 7–7		
November 7	at Washington State	Gonzaga Stadium; Spokane, WA	L 13–25	13,000	
November 14	Purdue	Macklin Field; East Lansing, MI	W 19–6	7,500	
November 21	West Virginia	Macklin Field; East Lansing, MI	W 7–0	6,400	
November 28	Oregon State	Macklin Field; East Lansing, MI	T 7–7	5,368	
^{†}Homecoming

== Game summaries ==
=== Michigan ===
Michigan State at Michigan

Team	1	2	3	4	Total
Mich. St.	0	0	0	0	0
• Michigan	0	0	13	7	20

- Date: October 3, 1942
- Location: Michigan Stadium
  Ann Arbor, MI
- Game attendance: 39,163

On October 3, 1942, Michigan State played Michigan. Playing in Ann Arbor in front of 39,163 spectators (the smallest crowd to see a Michigan-Michigan State game since 1935), the Wolverines defeated the Spartans, 20–0. With Don Kuzma injured, Don Robinson got the start at left halfback. Robinson scored the first touchdown for Michigan in the third quarter. Frank Wardley and Warren Yaap also scored touchdowns for Michigan. Jim Briske converted two PATs.
