= 1942 Texas Mines Miners football team =

American college football season

1942 Texas Mines Miners football
- Conference: Border Conference
- Record: 5–4 (4–3 Border)
- Head coach: Walter Milner (1st season)
- Home stadium: Kidd Field

1942 Border Conference football standings
	Conf.					Overall
Team	W		L		T	W		L		T
Hardin–Simmons +	4	–	0	–	1	9	–	1	–	1
Texas Tech +	3	–	0	–	1	4	–	5	–	1
West Texas State	5	–	2	–	0	7	–	2	–	0
Arizona	4	–	2	–	0	6	–	4	–	0
Texas Mines	4	–	3	–	0	5	–	4	–	0
New Mexico	3	–	4	–	0	4	–	5	–	2
Arizona State	2	–	5	–	0	2	–	8	–	0
Arizona State–Flagstaff	1	–	4	–	0	1	–	5	–	0
New Mexico A&M	0	–	6	–	0	1	–	8	–	0
+ – Conference co-champions

The 1942 Texas Mines Miners football team was an American football team that represented Texas School of Mines (now known as University of Texas at El Paso) as a member of the Border Conference during the 1942 college football season. In its first and only season under head coach Walter Milner, the team compiled a 5–4 record (4–3 against Border Conference opponents), finished fifth in the conference, and outscored opponents by a total of 162 to 111.

Texas Mines was ranked at No. 167 (out of 590 college and military teams) in the final rankings under the Litkenhous Difference by Score System for 1942.

== Schedule ==
Date	Time	Opponent	Site	Result	Source
September 27		at Louisiana Tech*	Tech Stadium; Ruston, LA	L 0–20	
October 2		New Mexico	Kidd Field; El Paso, TX	W 7–0	
October 9		Abilene Christian*	Kidd Field; El Paso, TX	W 20–14	
October 17		at West Texas State	Buffalo Stadium; Canyon, TX	L 0–7	
October 24		Hardin–Simmons	Kidd Field; El Paso, TX	L 0–39	
October 31		at Arizona State–Flagstaff	Skidmore Field; Flagstaff, AZ	W 20–0	
November 7		Arizona State	Kidd Field; El Paso, TX	W 40–6	
November 14		Arizona	Kidd Field; El Paso, TX	L 7–19	
November 26	2:30 p.m.	New Mexico A&M^{†}	Kidd Field; El Paso, TX (rivalry)	W 61–6	
*Non-conference game; ^{†}Homecoming; All times are in Mountain time
