= 1942 Miami Redskins football team =

American college football season

1942 Miami Redskins football
- Conference: Independent
- Record: 3–6
- Head coach: Stu Holcomb (1st season)
- Home stadium: Miami Field

1942 Midwestern college football independents records
	Conf.			Overall
Team	W	L	T	W		L		T
Central Michigan		–		6	–	0	–	0
Western Michigan		–		5	–	1	–	0
Cincinnati		–		8	–	2	–	0
Dayton		–		8	–	2	–	0
Marquette		–		7	–	2	–	0
No. 6 Notre Dame		–		7	–	2	–	2
Ohio		–		5	–	3	–	0
Detroit		–		5	–	4	–	0
Wichita		–		5	–	4	–	0
Michigan State		–		4	–	3	–	2
Michigan State Normal		–		3	–	3	–	1
Ohio Wesleyan		–		4	–	4	–	0
Xavier		–		4	–	5	–	0
Carthage		–		3	–	4	–	0
Miami (OH)		–		3	–	6	–	0
Wayne		–		1	–	6	–	1
Akron		–		0	–	7	–	2
Michigan Tech		–		0	–	3	–	0
Rankings from AP Poll

The 1942 Miami Redskins football team was an American football team that represented Miami University as an independent during the 1942 college football season. In its first season under head coach Stu Holcomb, Miami compiled a 3–6 record.

Miami was ranked at No. 169 (out of 590 college and military teams) in the final rankings under the Litkenhous Difference by Score System for 1942.

== Schedule ==
Date	Opponent	Site	Result	Attendance	Source
September 26	Centre	Miami Field; Oxford, OH	W 28–6		
October 3	at Dartmouth	Memorial Field; Hanover, NH	L 7–58	5,000	
October 10	Kent State	Miami Field; Oxford, OH	W 53–7		
October 17	Dayton	Miami Field; Oxford, OH	L 0–20	5,000	
October 24	at Bowling Green	Bowling Green, OH	L 6–7		
October 31	Ohio	Miami Field; Oxford, OH	L 13–39	6,000	
November 7	at Ohio Wesleyan	Delaware, OH	W 28–25		
November 14	at Western Reserve	Shaw Stadium; East Cleveland, OH	L 7–12		
November 26	at Cincinnati	Nippert Stadium; Cincinnati, OH (Victory Bell)	L 12–21	7,000	
