= 1942 Baylor Bears football team =

American college football season

1942 Baylor Bears football
- Conference: Southwest Conference
- Record: 6–4–1 (3–2–1 SWC)
- Head coach: Frank Kimbrough (2nd season)
- Captains: Milton Crain; Bill Coleman
- Home stadium: Municipal Stadium

1942 Southwest Conference football standings
	Conf.					Overall
Team	W		L		T	W		L		T
No. 11 Texas $	5	–	1	–	0	9	–	2	–	0
Rice	4	–	1	–	1	7	–	2	–	1
TCU	4	–	2	–	0	7	–	3	–	0
Baylor	3	–	2	–	1	6	–	4	–	1
Texas A&M	2	–	3	–	1	4	–	5	–	1
SMU	1	–	4	–	1	3	–	6	–	2
Arkansas	0	–	6	–	0	3	–	7	–	0
Rankings from AP Poll

The 1942 Baylor Bears football team represented Baylor University in the Southwest Conference (SWC) during the 1942 college football season. In their second season under head coach Frank Kimbrough, the Bears compiled a 6–4–1 record (3–2–1 against conference opponents), finished in fourth place in the conference, and outscored opponents by a combined total of 148 to 116. Milton Crain and Bill Coleman were the team captains.

Baylor was ranked at No. 62 (out of 590 college and military teams) in the final rankings under the Litkenhous Difference by Score System for 1942.

The team played its home games at Municipal Stadium in Waco, Texas.

== Schedule ==
Date	Opponent	Rank	Site	Result	Attendance	Source
September 19	Blackland AAF*		Municipal Stadium; Waco, TX	W 68–0		
September 26	Hardin–Simmons*		Municipal Stadium; Waco, TX	L 6–13		
October 3	at Oklahoma A&M*		Taft Stadium; Oklahoma City, OK	W 18–12		
October 10	at Arkansas		Razorback Stadium; Fayetteville, AR	W 20–7		
October 17	at Texas Tech*		Tech Field; Lubbock, TX (rivalry)	W 14–7	8,000	
October 24	Texas A&M^{†}		Municipal Stadium; Waco, TX (rivalry)	W 6–0		
October 31	at No. 9 TCU		Amon G. Carter Stadium; Fort Worth, TX (rivalry)	W 10–7	12,000	
November 7	at No. 14 Texas	No. 16	War Memorial Stadium; Austin, TX (rivalry)	L 0–20	25,000	
November 14	at No. 9 Tulsa*		Skelly Field; Tulsa, OK	L 0–24	15,000–16,000	
November 21	SMU		Municipal Stadium; Waco, TX	T 6–6		
November 28	Rice		Municipal Stadium; Waco, TX	L 0–20	7,000	
*Non-conference game; ^{†}Homecoming; Rankings from AP Poll released prior to the game

== Rankings ==
Ranking movements Legend: ██ Increase in ranking ██ Decrease in ranking — = Not ranked
	Week							
Poll	1	2	3	4	5	6	7	Final
AP	—	—	—	16	—	—	—	—
