= 1942 Xavier Musketeers football team =

American college football season

1942 Xavier Musketeers football
- Conference: Independent
- Record: 4–5
- Head coach: Clem Crowe (8th season)
- Home stadium: Xavier Stadium

1942 Midwestern college football independents records
	Conf.			Overall
Team	W	L	T	W		L		T
Central Michigan		–		6	–	0	–	0
Western Michigan		–		5	–	1	–	0
Cincinnati		–		8	–	2	–	0
Dayton		–		8	–	2	–	0
Marquette		–		7	–	2	–	0
No. 6 Notre Dame		–		7	–	2	–	2
Ohio		–		5	–	3	–	0
Detroit		–		5	–	4	–	0
Wichita		–		5	–	4	–	0
Michigan State		–		4	–	3	–	2
Michigan State Normal		–		3	–	3	–	1
Ohio Wesleyan		–		4	–	4	–	0
Xavier		–		4	–	5	–	0
Carthage		–		3	–	4	–	0
Miami (OH)		–		3	–	6	–	0
Wayne		–		1	–	6	–	1
Akron		–		0	–	7	–	2
Michigan Tech		–		0	–	3	–	0
Rankings from AP Poll

The 1942 Xavier Musketeers football team was an American football team that represented Xavier University as an independent during the 1942 college football season. In their eighth year under head coach Clem Crowe, the Musketeers compiled a 4–5 record.

Xavier was ranked at No. 127 (out of 590 college and military teams) in the final rankings under the Litkenhous Difference by Score System for 1942.

== Schedule ==
Date	Opponent	Site	Result	Attendance	Source
September 19	at Butler	Fairview Bowl; Indianapolis, IN	W 21–14	5,000	
September 25	Kentucky	Xavier Stadium; Cincinnati, OH	L 19–35	12,000	
October 3	Fort Knox	Xavier Stadium; Cincinnati, OH	W 12–2		
October 11	John Carroll	Xavier Stadium; Cincinnati, OH	W 26–7	7,500	
October 18	Creighton	Xavier Stadium; Cincinnati, OH	L 13–14	9,500	
October 24	at Dayton	UD Stadium; Dayton, OH	L 13–20	11,000	
November 7	Marshall	Xavier Stadium; Cincinnati, OH	W 13–7		
November 14	at Ohio	Ohio Stadium; Athens, OH	L 14–20	8,000	
November 21	at Cincinnati	Nippert Stadium; Cincinnati, OH (rivalry)	L 0–9	17,000	
