= Dukes Duford =

American college football player, coach, and university athletic director (1898–1981)

- Duford during his tenure at Saint Louis

Biographical details
- Born: June 11, 1898; Menomonie, Wisconsin, U.S.
- Died: May 8, 1981 (aged 82); Clayton, Missouri, U.S.

Playing career

Football
- 1921–1923: Marquette
- 1924: Green Bay Packers
- Position: Halfback

Coaching career (HC unless noted)

Football
- 1929–1930: St. Mary's (KS)
- 1931–1939: St. Ambrose
- 1940–1947: Saint Louis

Basketball
- 1931–1939: St. Ambrose
- 1944–1945: Saint Louis

Administrative career (AD unless noted)
- 1940-1947: Saint Louis

Head coaching record
- Overall: 92–50–9 (football)

Accomplishments and honors

Championships
- Football; 1 Iowa Conference (1937)

Wilfred Joseph "Dukes" Duford (June 11, 1898 – May 8, 1981) was an American college football player, coach, and university athletic director. He was the head football coach at Saint Louis University, Saint Ambrose University, and the University of Saint Mary (Kansas).

== Biography ==
Duford was born on June 11, 1898, in Menomonie, Wisconsin. Duford attended Niagara High School and Marquette University, where he played football, baseball, and basketball. Duford lettered in basketball from 1921 to 1923. He graduated in 1924.

After college, he played professional football in the National Football League (NFL) for one season with the Green Bay Packers. He saw action in three games in 1924 as a halfback.

Duford began his college football coaching career with a two-year stint at the University of Saint Mary in Kansas. He then moved on to Saint Ambrose University in Iowa, where he coached from 1931 to 1939. During his tenure there, Saint Ambrose posted a 60–10–7 record.

Impressed by his winning record, St. Ambrose University signed Duford to a multi-year contract as its football coach. Duford served as both the head football coach and athletic director at Saint Louis from 1940 to 1947. He also served as the basketball coach for the 1944–45 season and posted an 11–6 record. Duford and his staff resigned from Saint Louis after the 1947 season in which the football team amassed a 4–6 record. In his autobiography, Memories of a Hall of Fame Sportswriter, Bob Broeg called Duford his "candidate for the most noble coach of all."

In 1966, Duford was working as the Commissioner of the St. Louis Council on Human Relations, which was set up to facilitate racial integration of the city. Duford returned to Saint Louis University as its interim athletic director in 1967. Duford was inducted into the Saint Louis University's Billiken Hall of Fame in 1995.

Duford died at his Missouri home in 1981 of a heart ailment.

== Head coaching record ==
=== Football ===
Year	Team	Overall	Conference	Standing	Bowl/playoffs
St. Mary's Irish (Independent) (1929–1930)
1929	St. Mary's	2–5–2			
1930	St. Mary's	6–3			
St. Mary's:		8–8–2			
St. Ambrose Saints / Fighting Bees (Iowa Conference) (1931–1939)
1931	St. Ambrose	9–1	6–1	2nd	
1932	St. Ambrose	5–1–2	5–1–1	7th	
1933	St. Ambrose	4–4	4–2	T–3rd	
1934	St. Ambrose	6–2	5–0	2nd	
1935	St. Ambrose	7–1	4–0	2nd	
1936	St. Ambrose	8–0–1	4–0–1	2nd	
1937	St. Ambrose	8–0	5–0	T–1st	
1938	St. Ambrose	7–0–1	3–0	2nd	
1939	St. Ambrose	6–1–1	2–0	3rd	
St. Ambrose:		60–10–5	38–4–2		
Saint Louis Billikens (Missouri Valley Conference) (1940–1947)
1940	Saint Louis	3–6–1	2–3	5th	
1941	Saint Louis	4–5–1	1–3–1	4th	
1942	Saint Louis	4–5	2–3	T–3rd	
1943	No team—World War II				
1944	No team—World War II				
1945	Saint Louis	5–4	0–1	5th	
1946	Saint Louis	4–6	1–1	T–3rd	
1947	Saint Louis	4–6	1–1	3rd	
Saint Louis:		24–32–2	7–12–1		
Total:		92–50–9			
National championship Conference title Conference division title or championship game berth

=== Basketball ===
Record table
Season	Team	Overall	Conference	Standing	Postseason
Saint Louis Billikens (Missouri Valley Conference) (1944–1945)
1944–45	Saint Louis	10–4	^{[Note A]}	^{[Note A]}	
Total:		10–4 (.714)			

^A.The MVC also cancelled the season due to World War II.
