= 1942 Oklahoma A&M Cowboys football team =

American college football season

1942 Oklahoma A&M Cowboys football
- Conference: Missouri Valley Conference
- Record: 6–3–1 (4–1 MVC)
- Head coach: Jim Lookabaugh (4th season)
- Home stadium: Lewis Field

1942 Missouri Valley Conference football standings
	Conf.					Overall
Team	W		L		T	W		L		T
No. 4 Tulsa $	5	–	0	–	0	10	–	1	–	0
Oklahoma A&M	4	–	1	–	0	6	–	3	–	1
Washington University	2	–	3	–	0	5	–	5	–	0
Saint Louis	2	–	3	–	0	4	–	5	–	0
Creighton	1	–	4	–	0	5	–	4	–	0
Drake	1	–	4	–	0	3	–	7	–	0
$ – Conference champion; Rankings from AP Poll

The 1942 Oklahoma A&M Cowboys football team represented Oklahoma A&M College in the 1942 college football season. This was the 42nd year of football at A&M and the fourth under Jim Lookabaugh. The Cowboys played their home games at Lewis Field in Stillwater, Oklahoma. They finished the season 6–3–1, 3–1 in the Missouri Valley Conference.

Oklahoma A&M was ranked at No. 51 (out of 590 college and military teams) in the final rankings under the Litkenhous Difference by Score System for 1942.

== Schedule ==
Date	Time	Opponent	Site	Result	Attendance	Source
September 26		Oklahoma*	Lewis Field; Stillwater, OK (Bedlam Series)	T 0–0	13,000	
October 2		vs. Baylor*	Taft Stadium; Oklahoma City, OK	L 12–18		
October 10		at Texas Tech*	Tech Field; Lubbock, TX	W 9–6	6,000	
October 17		at Arizona*	Arizona Stadium; Tucson, AZ	L 6–20		
October 24	2:30 p.m.	Washington University	Lewis Field; Stillwater, OK	W 40–7	4,500	
October 31		at Creighton	Creighton Stadium; Omaha, NE	W 20–6		
November 7		at No. 12 Tulsa	Skelly Field; Tulsa, OK (rivalry)	L 6–34	13,000	
November 14		Saint Louis^{†}	Lewis Field; Stillwater, OK	W 54–7		
November 21		Drake	Lewis Field; Stillwater, OK	W 55–12	3,000	
November 28		at Detroit*	Titan Stadium; Detroit, MI	W 33–6	< 5,000	
*Non-conference game; ^{†}Homecoming; Rankings from AP Poll released prior to the game; All times are in Central time

== After the season ==
The 1943 NFL draft was held on April 8, 1943. The following Cowboys were selected.

Round	Pick	Player	Position	NFL team
14	128	Ralph Tate	Back	Chicago Bears
14	129	Loyd Arms	Guard	Green Bay Packers
20	181	Al Scanland	Back	Detroit Lions
23	216	Gene Hoeman	End	New York Giants
