= 1942 Cincinnati Bearcats football team =

American college football season

1942 Cincinnati Bearcats football
- Conference: Independent
- Record: 8–2
- Head coach: Joseph A. Meyer (5th season)
- Captain: Nick Skorich
- Home stadium: Nippert Stadium

1942 Midwestern college football independents records
	Conf.			Overall
Team	W	L	T	W		L		T
Central Michigan		–		6	–	0	–	0
Western Michigan		–		5	–	1	–	0
Cincinnati		–		8	–	2	–	0
Dayton		–		8	–	2	–	0
Marquette		–		7	–	2	–	0
No. 6 Notre Dame		–		7	–	2	–	2
Ohio		–		5	–	3	–	0
Detroit		–		5	–	4	–	0
Wichita		–		5	–	4	–	0
Michigan State		–		4	–	3	–	2
Michigan State Normal		–		3	–	3	–	1
Ohio Wesleyan		–		4	–	4	–	0
Xavier		–		4	–	5	–	0
Carthage		–		3	–	4	–	0
Miami (OH)		–		3	–	6	–	0
Wayne		–		1	–	6	–	1
Akron		–		0	–	7	–	2
Michigan Tech		–		0	–	3	–	0
Rankings from AP Poll

The 1942 Cincinnati Bearcats football team was an American football team that represented the University of Cincinnati as an independent during the 1942 college football season. The Bearcats were led by head coach Joseph A. Meyer and compiled a 8–2 record.

Cincinnati was ranked at No. 82 (out of 590 college and military teams) in the final rankings under the Litkenhous Difference by Score System for 1942.

== Schedule ==
Date	Time	Opponent	Site	Result	Attendance	Source
September 26	8:30 p.m.	Louisville	Nippert Stadium; Cincinnati, OH (rivalry)	W 51–0	2,500–3,000	
October 3		at Western Reserve	League Park; Cleveland, OH	W 18–7		
October 10		Centre	Nippert Stadium; Cincinnati, OH	W 21–0		
October 17		Ohio	Nippert Stadium; Cincinnati, OH	W 26–7		
October 24		No. 2 Georgia	Nippert Stadium; Cincinnati, OH	L 13–35	15,000	
October 31		Boston University	Nippert Stadium; Cincinnati, OH	W 6–0		
November 7		at Tennessee	Neyland Stadium; Knoxville, TN	L 12–34		
November 14		Dayton	Nippert Stadium; Cincinnati, OH	W 20–0	8,000	
November 21		Xavier	Nippert Stadium; Cincinnati, OH (rivalry)	W 9–0	17,000	
November 26		Miami (OH)	Nippert Stadium; Cincinnati, OH (Victory Bell)	W 21–12		
Rankings from AP Poll released prior to the game
