= 1942 New Mexico Lobos football team =

American college football season

1942 New Mexico Lobos football
- Conference: Border Conference
- Record: 4–5–2 (3–4 Border)
- Head coach: Willis Barnes (1st season)
- Home stadium: Hilltop Stadium

1942 Border Conference football standings
	Conf.					Overall
Team	W		L		T	W		L		T
Hardin–Simmons +	4	–	0	–	1	9	–	1	–	1
Texas Tech +	3	–	0	–	1	4	–	5	–	1
West Texas State	5	–	2	–	0	7	–	2	–	0
Arizona	4	–	2	–	0	6	–	4	–	0
Texas Mines	4	–	3	–	0	5	–	4	–	0
New Mexico	3	–	4	–	0	4	–	5	–	2
Arizona State	2	–	5	–	0	2	–	8	–	0
Arizona State–Flagstaff	1	–	4	–	0	1	–	5	–	0
New Mexico A&M	0	–	6	–	0	1	–	8	–	0
+ – Conference co-champions

The 1942 New Mexico Lobos football team represented the University of New Mexico in the Border Conference during the 1942 college football season. In their first season under head coach Willis Barnes, the Lobos compiled a 4–5–2 record (3–4 against Border opponents), finished sixth in the conference, and were outscored by opponents by a total of 134 to 99.

New Mexico was ranked at No. 162 (out of 590 college and military teams) in the final rankings under the Litkenhous Difference by Score System for 1942.

== Schedule ==
Date	Time	Opponent	Site	Result	Attendance	Source
September 19	8:00 p.m.	vs. Albuquerque AAB*	Hilltop Stadium; Albuquerque, NM	W 7–6	9,000–10,000	
September 25		Arizona State–Flagstaff	Hilltop Stadium; Albuquerque, NM	W 26–6		
October 2		at Texas Mines	Kidd Field; El Paso, TX	L 0–7		
October 10		New Mexico A&M	Hilltop Stadium; Albuquerque, NM (rivalry)	W 32–0		
October 17		at Colorado*	Colorado Stadium; Boulder, CO	L 0–12	6,500	
October 24		Texas Tech	Hilltop Stadium; Albuquerque, NM	L 0–20	4,500	
October 31		at Nevada*	Mackay Field; Reno, NV	T 0–0	3,000	
November 7		at Arizona	Arizona Stadium; Tucson, AZ (rivalry)	L 13–14		
November 14		West Texas State^{†}	Hilltop Stadium; Albuquerque, NM	L 7–13		
November 22		at Loyola (CA)*	Gilmore Stadium; Los Angeles, CA	T 14–14	6,000	
November 28		Arizona State	Hilltop Stadium; Albuquerque, NM	W 35–7		
*Non-conference game; ^{†}Homecoming; All times are in Mountain time
