= 1942 Dayton Flyers football team =

American college football season

1942 Dayton Flyers football
- Conference: Independent
- Record: 8–2
- Head coach: Harry Baujan (20st season)
- Home stadium: University of Dayton Stadium

1942 Midwestern college football independents records
| | Conf. | | | Overall |
| Team | W | L | T | W | | L | | T |
|---|---|---|---|---|---|---|---|---|
| Central Michigan | | – | | 6 | – | 0 | – | 0 |
| Western Michigan | | – | | 5 | – | 1 | – | 0 |
| Cincinnati | | – | | 8 | – | 2 | – | 0 |
| Dayton | | – | | 8 | – | 2 | – | 0 |
| Marquette | | – | | 7 | – | 2 | – | 0 |
| No. 6 Notre Dame | | – | | 7 | – | 2 | – | 2 |
| Ohio | | – | | 5 | – | 3 | – | 0 |
| Detroit | | – | | 5 | – | 4 | – | 0 |
| Wichita | | – | | 5 | – | 4 | – | 0 |
| Michigan State | | – | | 4 | – | 3 | – | 2 |
| Michigan State Normal | | – | | 3 | – | 3 | – | 1 |
| Ohio Wesleyan | | – | | 4 | – | 4 | – | 0 |
| Xavier | | – | | 4 | – | 5 | – | 0 |
| Carthage | | – | | 3 | – | 4 | – | 0 |
| Miami (OH) | | – | | 3 | – | 6 | – | 0 |
| Wayne | | – | | 1 | – | 6 | – | 1 |
| Akron | | – | | 0 | – | 7 | – | 2 |
| Michigan Tech | | – | | 0 | – | 3 | – | 0 |
Rankings from AP Poll

The 1942 Dayton Flyers football team was an American football team that represented the University of Dayton as an independent during the 1942 college football season. In their 20th season under head coach Harry Baujan, the Flyers compiled an 8–2 record.

Dayton was ranked at No. 93 (out of 590 college and military teams) in the final rankings under the Litkenhous Difference by Score System for 1942.

== Schedule ==
| Date | Opponent | Site | Result | Attendance | Source |
|---|---|---|---|---|---|
| September 19 | Findlay | University of Dayton Stadium; Dayton, OH | W 49–0 | 3,700 | |
| September 26 | Western Michigan | University of Dayton Stadium; Dayton, OH | W 21–0 | 3,000 | |
| October 3 | Heidelberg | University of Dayton Stadium; Dayton, OH | W 20–2 | | |
| October 10 | at Tennessee | Shields–Watkins Field; Knoxville, TN | L 6–34 | | |
| October 17 | at Miami (OH) | Miami Stadium; Oxford, OH | W 20–0 | 5,000 | |
| October 24 | Xavier | University of Dayton Stadium; Dayton, OH | W 20–13 | 11,000 | |
| October 31 | Marshall^{†} | University of Dayton Stadium; Dayton, OH | W 20–13 | 6,500 | |
| November 7 | Chattanooga | University of Dayton Stadium; Dayton, OH | W 14–12 | | |
| November 14 | at Cincinnati | Nippert Stadium; Cincinnati, OH | L 0–20 | 8,000 | |
| November 26 | Ohio | University of Dayton Stadium; Dayton, OH | W 20–0 | 4,000 | |
^{†}Homecoming
