= 1942 Kent State Golden Flashes football team =

American college football season

1942 Kent State Golden Flashes football
- Conference: Ohio Athletic Conference
- Record: 5–3 (2–1 OAC)
- Head coach: Donald Starn (8th season)
- Home stadium: Kent State Athletic Field

1942 Ohio Athletic Conference football standings
	Conf.					Overall
Team	W		L		T	W		L		T
Ohio Northern $	5	–	0	–	1	6	–	1	–	1
John Carroll	3	–	0	–	1	3	–	2	–	3
Toledo	1	–	0	–	1	4	–	4	–	1
Denison	4	–	1	–	1	6	–	2	–	1
Oberlin	2	–	1	–	0	5	–	1	–	1
Baldwin–Wallace	2	–	1	–	0	6	–	2	–	0
Otterbein	4	–	2	–	0	5	–	3	–	0
Kent State	2	–	1	–	0	5	–	3	–	0
Wooster	5	–	3	–	0	6	–	3	–	0
Bowling Green	1	–	1	–	1	6	–	2	–	1
Findlay	2	–	3	–	1	5	–	4	–	1
Heidelberg	2	–	3	–	0	4	–	4	–	0
Case	1	–	2	–	0	4	–	4	–	0
Capital	1	–	3	–	0	3	–	4	–	0
Muskingum	1	–	4	–	0	3	–	4	–	2
Wittenberg	1	–	4	–	1	1	–	5	–	1
Kenyon	0	–	2	–	0	5	–	2	–	0
Mount Union	0	–	6	–	0	1	–	6	–	0
$ – Conference champion

The 1942 Kent State Golden Flashes football team was an American football team that represented Kent State University in the Ohio Athletic Conference (OAC) during the 1942 college football season. In its eighth season under head coach Donald Starn, Kent State compiled a 5–3 record.

Kent State was ranked at No. 313 (out of 590 college and military teams) in the final rankings under the Litkenhous Difference by Score System for 1942.

== Schedule ==
Date	Opponent	Site	Result	Attendance	Source
September 26	at Toledo	Toledo, OH	L 14–26		
October 3	Findlay	Kent State Athletic Field; Kent, OH	W 6–0		
October 10	at Miami (OH)*	Miami Field; Oxford, OH	L 7–53		
October 17	Wright-Patterson Fields*	Kent State Athletic Field; Kent, OH	W 24–0	3,000	
October 24	Western Reserve*	Kent State Athletic Field; Kent, OH	L 13–28		
October 31	at Bowling Green	Bowling Green, OH (rivalry)	W 7–0	2,500	
November 7	Hiram*	Hiram, OH	W 20–0		
November 14	at Akron*	Rubber Bowl; Akron, OH (rivalry)	W 23–6		
*Non-conference game
