= 1942 Creighton Bluejays football team =

American college football season

1942 Creighton Bluejays football
- Conference: Missouri Valley Conference
- Record: 5–4 (1–4 MVC)
- Head coach: Maurice H. Palrang (3rd season)
- Home stadium: Creighton Stadium

1942 Missouri Valley Conference football standings
	Conf.					Overall
Team	W		L		T	W		L		T
No. 4 Tulsa $	5	–	0	–	0	10	–	1	–	0
Oklahoma A&M	4	–	1	–	0	6	–	3	–	1
Washington University	2	–	3	–	0	5	–	5	–	0
Saint Louis	2	–	3	–	0	4	–	5	–	0
Creighton	1	–	4	–	0	5	–	4	–	0
Drake	1	–	4	–	0	3	–	7	–	0
$ – Conference champion; Rankings from AP Poll

The 1942 Creighton Bluejays football team was an American football team that represented Creighton University as a member of the Missouri Valley Conference (MVC) during the 1942 college football season. In its third season under head coach Maurice H. Palrang, and its final season of intercollegiate football, Creighton compiled a 5–4 record (1–4 against MVC opponents) and outscored opponents by a total of 170 to 127. The team played its home games at Creighton Stadium in Omaha, Nebraska.

In the final game in program history, Creighton was tied with undefeated Tulsa (ranked No. 6 in the AP Poll) at the end of the third quarter, but lost by a 33–19 score as Tulsa rallied for two touchdowns in the fourth quarter.

A subsequent game scheduled for November 29 against Loyola in Los Angeles was cancelled due to wartime travel restrictions.

Creighton was ranked at No. 120 (out of 590 college and military teams) in the final rankings under the Litkenhous Difference by Score System for 1942.

In December 1942, Creighton's athletic director, Rev. David A. Shyne, announced that, at the end of the basketball season, the school would suspend its participation in intercollegiate football and basketball for the duration of the war. The football program did not return after the war, as it would become a trend among Catholic universities during the war and immediate post-war years to terminate their football programs. This trend also involved Gonzaga (1941); Providence (1941); Manhattan (1942); Saint Louis (1949); Portland (1949); Saint Mary's (1950); (Note: Saint Mary's did make a comeback to football at "College Division" (ancestor of NCAA Division II and III) level between 1959 and 1992, and would play as an independent in NCAA division I-AA (ancestor of today's Football Championship Subdivision) between 1993 and 2003, before dropping football again after 2003.) Mount St. Mary's (1950); Niagara (1950); Loyola (1951); San Francisco (1951); (Note: San Francisco did make a comeback to football at "College Division" level between 1959 and 1982, but has not fielded a varsity football team since 1983.) St. Bonaventure (1951) and Santa Clara (1952). (Note: Santa Clara did make a comeback to football at "College Division" level between 1959 and 1992, but has not fielded a varsity football team since 1993.)

== Schedule ==
Date	Time	Opponent	Site	Result	Attendance	Source
September 25		Colorado Springs Air Base*	Creighton Stadium; Omaha, NE	W 20–0		
October 2	8:15 p.m.	Washington University	Creighton Stadium; Omaha, NE	L 12–13	10,000	
October 11		Fort Riley*	Creighton Stadium; Omaha, NE	W 34–7		
October 18		at Xavier*	Xavier Stadium; Cincinnati, OH	W 14–13	9,500	
October 24		at Drake	Drake Stadium; Des Moines, IA	W 33–14		
October 31		Oklahoma A&M^{†}	Creighton Stadium; Omaha, NE	L 6–20	8,000	
November 8		at Saint Louis	Walsh Stadium; St. Louis, MO	L 19–21	6,204	
November 14		Texas Tech*	Creighton Stadium; Omaha, NE	W 13–6		
November 21		No. 6 Tulsa	Creighton Stadium; Omaha, NE	L 19–33	9,000	
November 29		at Loyola (CA)	Los Angeles, CA	Cancelled		
*Non-conference game; ^{†}Homecoming; Rankings from AP Poll released prior to the game; All times are in Central time
