= 1942 Texas A&M Aggies football team =

American college football season

1942 Texas A&M Aggies football
- Conference: Southwest Conference
- Record: 4–5–1 (2–3–1 SWC)
- Head coach: Homer Norton (9th season)
- Home stadium: Kyle Field

1942 Southwest Conference football standings
	Conf.					Overall
Team	W		L		T	W		L		T
No. 11 Texas $	5	–	1	–	0	9	–	2	–	0
Rice	4	–	1	–	1	7	–	2	–	1
TCU	4	–	2	–	0	7	–	3	–	0
Baylor	3	–	2	–	1	6	–	4	–	1
Texas A&M	2	–	3	–	1	4	–	5	–	1
SMU	1	–	4	–	1	3	–	6	–	2
Arkansas	0	–	6	–	0	3	–	7	–	0
Rankings from AP Poll

The 1942 Texas A&M Aggies football team represented the Agricultural and Mechanical College of Texas—now known as Texas A&M University—in the Southwest Conference (SWC) during the 1942 college football season. In its ninth season under head coach Homer Norton, the team compiled an overall record of 4–5–1, with a mark of 2–3–1 in conference play, and finished fifth in the SWC.

Texas A&M was ranked at No. 37 (out of 590 college and military teams) in the final rankings under the Litkenhous Difference by Score System for 1942.

== Schedule ==
Date	Opponent	Site	Result	Attendance	Source
September 26	at LSU*	Tiger Stadium; Baton Rouge, LA (rivalry)	L 7–16	25,000	
October 3	Texas Tech*	Kyle Field; College Station, TX (rivalry)	W 19–0	10,000	
October 10	at Corpus Christi NAS*	Buccaneer Stadium; Corpus Christi, TX	L 7–18		
October 17	No. 17 TCU	Kyle Field; College Station, TX (rivalry)	L 2–7	14,000	
October 24	at Baylor	Municipal Stadium; Waco, TX (rivalry)	L 0–6		
October 31	Arkansas	Kyle Field; College Station, TX (rivalry)	W 41–0		
November 7	at SMU	Ownby Stadium; University Park, TX	W 27–20		
November 14	at Rice	Rice Field; Houston, TX	T 0–0	20,000	
November 26	at No. 18 Texas	War Memorial Stadium; Austin, TX (rivalry)	L 6–12	43,000	
December 5	vs. No. 15 Washington State	Alamo Stadium; San Antonio, TX	W 21–0	18,000	
*Non-conference game; Rankings from AP Poll released prior to the game
