= 1942 New Mexico A&M Aggies football team =

American college football season

1942 New Mexico A&M Aggies football
- Conference: Border Conference
- Record: 1–8 (0–6 Border)
- Head coach: Julius H. Johnston (3rd season)
- Home stadium: Quesenberry Field

1942 Border Conference football standings
	Conf.					Overall
Team	W		L		T	W		L		T
Hardin–Simmons +	4	–	0	–	1	9	–	1	–	1
Texas Tech +	3	–	0	–	1	4	–	5	–	1
West Texas State	5	–	2	–	0	7	–	2	–	0
Arizona	4	–	2	–	0	6	–	4	–	0
Texas Mines	4	–	3	–	0	5	–	4	–	0
New Mexico	3	–	4	–	0	4	–	5	–	2
Arizona State	2	–	5	–	0	2	–	8	–	0
Arizona State–Flagstaff	1	–	4	–	0	1	–	5	–	0
New Mexico A&M	0	–	6	–	0	1	–	8	–	0
+ – Conference co-champions

The 1942 New Mexico A&M Aggies football team was an American football team that represented New Mexico College of Agriculture and Mechanical Arts (now known as New Mexico State University) as a member of the Border Conference during the 1942 college football season. In its third and final year under head coach Julius H. Johnston, the team compiled a 1–8 record (0–6 against conference opponents), finished in last place in the conference, and was outscored by a total of 223 to 33. The team played home games at Quesenberry Field in Las Cruces, New Mexico.

New Mexico A&M was ranked No. 486 (out of 590 college and military teams) in the final rankings under the Litkenhous Difference by Score System for 1942.

== Schedule ==
Date	Time	Opponent	Site	Result	Source
September 19		Silver City Teachers*	Quesenberry Field; Las Cruces, NM	W 27–6	
September 26		at Arizona	Arizona Stadium; Tucson, AZ	L 0–53	
October 3		McMurry*	Quesenberry Field; Las Cruces, NM	L 0–12	
October 10		at New Mexico	Hilltop Stadium; Albuquerque, NM (rivalry)	L 0–32	
October 24		at Arizona State	Goodwin Stadium; Tempe, AZ	L 0–20	
October 31		West Texas State	Quesenberry Field; Las Cruces, NM	L 0–23	
November 11		Albuquerque AAB*	Quesenberry Field; Las Cruces, NM	L 0–13	
November 21		Arizona State–Flagstaff^{†}	Quesenberry Field; Las Cruces, NM	L 0–3	
November 26	2:30 p.m.	at Texas Mines	Kidd Field; El Paso, TX (rivalry)	L 6–61	
*Non-conference game; ^{†}Homecoming; All times are in Mountain time
