= 1942 Marquette Hilltoppers football team =

American college football season

1942 Marquette Hilltoppers football
- Conference: Independent
- Record: 7–2
- Head coach: Thomas E. Stidham (2nd season)
- Home stadium: Marquette Stadium

1942 Midwestern college football independents records
	Conf.			Overall
Team	W	L	T	W		L		T
Central Michigan		–		6	–	0	–	0
Western Michigan		–		5	–	1	–	0
Cincinnati		–		8	–	2	–	0
Dayton		–		8	–	2	–	0
Marquette		–		7	–	2	–	0
No. 6 Notre Dame		–		7	–	2	–	2
Ohio		–		5	–	3	–	0
Detroit		–		5	–	4	–	0
Wichita		–		5	–	4	–	0
Michigan State		–		4	–	3	–	2
Michigan State Normal		–		3	–	3	–	1
Ohio Wesleyan		–		4	–	4	–	0
Xavier		–		4	–	5	–	0
Carthage		–		3	–	4	–	0
Miami (OH)		–		3	–	6	–	0
Wayne		–		1	–	6	–	1
Akron		–		0	–	7	–	2
Michigan Tech		–		0	–	3	–	0
Rankings from AP Poll

The 1942 Marquette Hilltoppers football team was an American football team that represented Marquette University as an independent during the 1942 college football season. In its second season under head coach Thomas E. Stidham, the team compiled a 7–2 record and outscored opponents by a total of 193 to 90. Its victories included major college opponents, Kansas, Michigan State, Iowa State, and Arizona, and its two losses were to Wisconsin and Great Lakes Navy.

Marquette was ranked at No. 30 (out of 590 college and military teams) in the final rankings under the Litkenhous Difference by Score System for 1942.

The team played its home games at Marquette Stadium in Milwaukee.

== Schedule ==
Date	Opponent	Site	Result	Attendance	Source
September 26	at Kansas	Memorial Stadium; Lawrence, KS	W 14–0	2,006	
October 3	at Wisconsin	Camp Randall Stadium; Madison, WI	L 7–35	35,000	
October 10	at Iowa State	Clyde Williams Field; Ames, IA	W 34–12	7,000	
October 17	at Michigan State	Macklin Field; East Lansing, MI	W 28–7		
October 24	Arizona	Marquette Stadium; Milwaukee, MI	W 39–0	18,000	
November 1	Detroit	Marquette Stadium; Milwaukee, MI	W 10–0	7,000	
November 8	Manhattan^{†}	Marquette Stadium; Milwaukee, MI	W 27–12	14,000	
November 15	Great Lakes Navy	Marquette Stadium; Milwaukee, MI	L 0–24	20,000	
November 22	Camp Grant	Marquette Stadium; Milwaukee, MI	W 34–0	12,000	
^{†}Homecoming
