= 1942 Drake Bulldogs football team =

American college football season

1942 Drake Bulldogs football
- Conference: Missouri Valley Conference
- Record: 3–7 (1–4 MVC)
- Head coach: Vee Green (10th season)
- Home stadium: Drake Stadium

1942 Missouri Valley Conference football standings
	Conf.					Overall
Team	W		L		T	W		L		T
No. 4 Tulsa $	5	–	0	–	0	10	–	1	–	0
Oklahoma A&M	4	–	1	–	0	6	–	3	–	1
Washington University	2	–	3	–	0	5	–	5	–	0
Saint Louis	2	–	3	–	0	4	–	5	–	0
Creighton	1	–	4	–	0	5	–	4	–	0
Drake	1	–	4	–	0	3	–	7	–	0
$ – Conference champion; Rankings from AP Poll

The 1942 Drake Bulldogs football team represented Drake University as a member of the Missouri Valley Conference (MVC) during the 1942 college football season. In its 10th season under head coach Vee Green, the team compiled a 3–7 record (1–4 in conference games), and was outscored by a total of 225 to 115.

The team played its home games at Drake Stadium in Des Moines, Iowa.

== Schedule ==
Date	Opponent	Site	Result	Attendance	Source
September 18	Central (IA)*	Drake Stadium; Des Moines, IA	W 32–0	3,500	
September 25	St. Ambrose*	Drake Stadium; Des Moines, IA	L 6–12		
October 2	Grinnell*	Drake Stadium; Des Moines, IA	W 7–6	8,000	
October 9	Saint Louis	Drake Stadium; Des Moines, IA	W 19–9		
October 17	at Iowa State*	Clyde Williams Field; Ames, IA	L 6–29	6,081	
October 24	Creighton	Drake Stadium; Des Moines, IA	L 14–33		
October 30	No. 15 Tulsa	Drake Stadium; Des Moines, IA	L 0–40	2,500	
November 7	at Iowa State Teachers*	O. R. Latham Stadium; Cedar Falls, IA	L 12–27	3,000	
November 14	at Washington University	Francis Field; St. Louis, MO	L 7–14	5,000	
November 21	at Oklahoma A&M	Lewis Field; Stillwater, OK	L 12–55	3,000	
*Non-conference game; Rankings from Coaches' Poll released prior to the game
