= 1942 Western Michigan Broncos football team =

American college football season

1942 Western Michigan Broncos football
- Conference: Independent
- Record: 5–1
- Head coach: John Gill (1st season)
- MVP: Bill Yambrick
- Captain: Bill Yambrick
- Home stadium: Waldo Stadium

1942 Midwestern college football independents records
	Conf.			Overall
Team	W	L	T	W		L		T
Central Michigan		–		6	–	0	–	0
Western Michigan		–		5	–	1	–	0
Cincinnati		–		8	–	2	–	0
Dayton		–		8	–	2	–	0
Marquette		–		7	–	2	–	0
No. 6 Notre Dame		–		7	–	2	–	2
Ohio		–		5	–	3	–	0
Detroit		–		5	–	4	–	0
Wichita		–		5	–	4	–	0
Michigan State		–		4	–	3	–	2
Michigan State Normal		–		3	–	3	–	1
Ohio Wesleyan		–		4	–	4	–	0
Xavier		–		4	–	5	–	0
Carthage		–		3	–	4	–	0
Miami (OH)		–		3	–	6	–	0
Wayne		–		1	–	6	–	1
Akron		–		0	–	7	–	2
Michigan Tech		–		0	–	3	–	0
Rankings from AP Poll

The 1942 Western Michigan Broncos football team represented Michigan College of Education (later renamed Western Michigan University) as an independent during the 1942 college football season. In their first season under head coach John Gill, the Broncos compiled a 5–1 record and outscored their opponents, 66 to 37. The team played their home games at Waldo Stadium in Kalamazoo, Michigan.

Center Bill Yambrick was the team captain. He also received the team's most outstanding player award.

Western Michigan was ranked at No. 157 (out of 590 college and military teams) in the final rankings under the Litkenhous Difference by Score System for 1942.

== Schedule ==
Date	Opponent	Site	Result	Attendance	Source
September 26	at Dayton	Baujan Field; Dayton, OH	L 0–21	3,000	
October 10	Toledo	Waldo Stadium; Kalamazoo, MI	W 13–0		
October 17	Iowa State Teachers	Waldo Stadium; Kalamazoo, MI	W 14–7		
October 24	Butler	Waldo Stadium; Kalamazoo, MI	W 13–7		
November 7	Grosse Isle NAS	Waldo Stadium; Kalamazoo, MI	W 13–2		
November 14	Wayne	Waldo Stadium; Kalamazoo, MI	W 13–0		
Rankings from AP Poll released prior to the game
