= 1942 Western Reserve Red Cats football team =

American college football season

1942 Western Reserve Red Cats football

Big Four champion
- Conference: Big Four Conference
- Record: 8–3 (3–0 Big Four)
- Head coach: Tom Davies (2nd season)
- Home stadium: Shaw Stadium

The 1942 Western Reserve Red Cats football team represented the Western Reserve University, now known as Case Western Reserve University, during the 1942 college football season. The team was coached by Tom Davies, assisted by Dick Luther until he was called to the U.S. Navy early in the season.

Western Reserve was ranked at No. 111 (out of 590 college and military teams) in the final rankings under the Litkenhous Difference by Score System for 1942.

== Schedule ==
| Date | Opponent | Site | Result | Attendance | Source |
|---|---|---|---|---|---|
| September 18 | at Akron* | Rubber Bowl; Akron, OH | W 39–0 | | |
| September 25 | at Youngstown* | Rayen Stadium; Youngstown, OH | W 21–7 | | |
| October 3 | Cincinnati* | Shaw Stadium; East Cleveland, OH | L 7–18 | | |
| October 9 | at Syracuse* | Archbold Stadium; Syracuse, NY | L 0–13 | 8,000 | |
| October 17 | at Baldwin–Wallace | Berea, OH | W 12–0 | | |
| October 24 | at Kent State* | Athletic Field; Kent, OH | W 28–13 | | |
| October 29 | John Carroll | Shaw Stadium; East Cleveland, OH | W 21–0 | | |
| November 6 | Ohio* | Shaw Stadium; East Cleveland, OH | W 20–7 | 9,000 | |
| November 14 | Miami (OH)* | Shaw Stadium; East Cleveland, OH | W 12–7 | | |
| November 21 | Ohio Wesleyan* | Shaw Stadium; East Cleveland, OH | L 12–13 | | |
| November 26 | vs. Case | Municipal Stadium; Cleveland, OH | W 25–0 | | |
*Non-conference game
