= Tom Gorman (American football) =

American football player and coach (1910–1975)

Biographical details
- Born: June 9, 1910; Chicago, Illinois, U.S.
- Died: April 8, 1975 (aged 64); Peoria, Illinois, U.S.

Playing career

Football
- 1929–1933: Notre Dame
- Position: Center

Coaching career (HC unless noted)

Football
- 1934–1935: Notre Dame (freshman assistant)
- 1936–1937: Kentucky (line)
- 1938–1941: Creighton (line)
- 1942: Washington University

Head coaching record
- Overall: 5–5

Accomplishments and honors

Awards
- Chicago College All-Star (1934)

Thomas Anthony "Kitty" Gorman (June 9, 1910 – April 8, 1975) was an American college football player and coach. Gorman starred as a prep at St. Philip's in Chicago, Illinois. Gorman played center at University of Notre Dame on the freshman team in 1929 and on the varsity from 1930 to 1933. He was one of the team's two captains in 1933. During the 1933 season, Gorman's father wrote a letter to Notre Dame Vice President John Francis O'Hara, complaining that "[t]here is something radically wrong" with Hunk Anderson's coaching, blaming the younger Gorman for losses. Anderson was fired after the 1933 season, the school's first losing season since 1888.

Gorman began his career at Notre Dame playing for famed coach Knute Rockne. James Bacon recounts a story implicating the mob in the Rockne's death that he heard with "Kitty" Gorman from Father John Reynolds when Bacon and Gorman were students at Notre Dame.

After his college playing career, Gorman played in the first Chicago College All-Star Game, tying the Chicago Bears.

== Coaching career ==
Gorman began his coaching career as an assistant on the freshman team at Notre Dame, while pursuing his law degree. Gorman left Notre Dame to serve as the line coach for former Notre Dame fullback Chet A. Wynne at Kentucky. In 1938, Gorman accepted the line coach position under another former Irish football player, Marchmont Schwartz, at Creighton. Gorman served as the head football coach at Washington University in St. Louis in 1942, compiling a career college football coaching record of 5–5. For the 1942 season, he hired two former Notre Dame players to assist him, Andy Pilney and Bud Kerr.

Gorman accepted commission as a lieutenant in the United States Navy and served in World War II. Washington University did not field a football team from 1943 to 1945 and offered Gorman his head coaching position for 1946 with no guarantee that there would be a season. He turned down the offer, due to disagreements with Chancellor Arthur Holly Compton, who emphasized a focus on education and opposed athletic scholarships. Washington University did not play football in 1946, but the team returned for the 1947 season. Gorman left coaching after the war and began working for General Motors in Chicago.

== Head coaching record ==
Year	Team	Overall	Conference	Standing	Bowl/playoffs
Washington University Bears (Missouri Valley Conference) (1942)
1942	Washington University	5–5	2–3	T–3rd	
Washington University:		5–5	2–3		
Total:		5–5			
