= Robert Whittaker (American football) =

Biographical details
- Born: January 31, 1904; Greenville, Ohio, U.S.
- Died: June 5, 1990 (aged 86); Canon City, Colorado, U.S.

Playing career

Football
- 1926–1928: Miami (OH)

Coaching career (HC unless noted)

Football
- 1930–1940: Sandusky HS (OH)
- 1941–1954: Bowling Green

Track
- 1942–1948: Bowling Green
- 1956–1960: Bowling Green
- 1961–1966: Bowling Green (assistant)

Head coaching record
- Overall: 66–50–7 (college football)

Robert Harold Whittaker (January 31, 1904 – June 5, 1990) was an American football player and coach of football and track. He served as the head football coach at Bowling Green State University from 1941 to 1954, compiling a record of 66–50–7.

== Head coaching record ==
=== College football ===
Year	Team	Overall	Conference	Standing	Bowl/playoffs
Bowling Green Falcons (Ohio Athletic Conference) (1941–1942)
1941	Bowling Green	7–1–1	4–0–1	4th	
1942	Bowling Green	6–2–1	1–1–1	9th	
Bowling Green Falcons (Independent) (1943–1951)
1943	Bowling Green	5–3–1			
1944	Bowling Green	5–3			
1945	Bowling Green	4–3			
1946	Bowling Green	5–3			
1947	Bowling Green	5–5			
1948	Bowling Green	8–0–1			
1949	Bowling Green	4–5			
1950	Bowling Green	3–4–2			
1951	Bowling Green	4–4–1			
Bowling Green Falcons (Mid-American Conference) (1952–1954)
1952	Bowling Green	7–2	2–2	T–4th	
1953	Bowling Green	1–8	0–4	7th	
1954	Bowling Green	2–7	0–6	8th	
Bowling Green:		66–50–7	7–13–2		
Total:		66–50–7			
