= 1942 Hardin–Simmons Cowboys football team =

American college football season

1942 Hardin–Simmons Cowboys football

Border co-champion

Sun Bowl, L 6–13 vs. Second Air Force
- Conference: Border Conference
- Record: 9–1–1 (4–0–1 Border)
- Head coach: Warren B. Woodson (2nd season; regular season); Clark Jarnagin (interim, bowl game)
- Home stadium: Hardin–Simmons Stadium

1942 Border Conference football standings
	Conf.					Overall
Team	W		L		T	W		L		T
Hardin–Simmons +	4	–	0	–	1	9	–	1	–	1
Texas Tech +	3	–	0	–	1	4	–	5	–	1
West Texas State	5	–	2	–	0	7	–	2	–	0
Arizona	4	–	2	–	0	6	–	4	–	0
Texas Mines	4	–	3	–	0	5	–	4	–	0
New Mexico	3	–	4	–	0	4	–	5	–	2
Arizona State	2	–	5	–	0	2	–	8	–	0
Arizona State–Flagstaff	1	–	4	–	0	1	–	5	–	0
New Mexico A&M	0	–	6	–	0	1	–	8	–	0
+ – Conference co-champions

The 1942 Hardin–Simmons Cowboys football team was an American football team that represented Hardin–Simmons University in the Border Conference during the 1942 college football season. The team compiled a 9–1–1 record (4–0–1 against conference opponents), tied with Texas Tech for the conference championship, lost its only game to the Second Air Force Bombers in the 1943 Sun Bowl, and outscored all opponents by a total of 254 to 71.

Warren B. Woodson was in his second season as the team's head coach. Woodson went into the United States Navy at the end of the regular season, and assistant coach Clark Jarnagin took over as interim head coach for the Sun Bowl game.

Backs Rudy Mobley and Camp Wilson led the team on offense. Mobley led the country and set a new NCAA single-season record with 1,281 rushing yards in 10 regular season games.

Hardin–Simmons was ranked at No. 56 (out of 590 college and military teams) in the final rankings under the Litkenhous Difference by Score System for 1942.

== Schedule ==
Date	Opponent	Rank	Site	Result	Attendance	Source
September 26	at Baylor*		Municipal Stadium; Waco, TX	W 13–6		
October 3	North Texas State*		Hardin–Simmons Stadium; Abilene, TX	W 34–0		
October 10	vs. SMU*		Alamo Stadium; San Antonio, TX	W 7–6	20,000	
October 17	at Arizona State		Goodwin Stadium; Tempe, AZ	W forfeit		
October 24	Texas Mines		Hardin–Simmons Stadium; Abilene, TX	W 39–7		
October 31	at Arizona		Arizona Stadium; Tucson, AZ	W 34–26	7,500	
November 7	at West Texas State		Buffalo Stadium; Canyon, TX	W 40–0		
November 14	Louisiana Tech*	No. 19	Hardin–Simmons Stadium; Abilene, TX	W 47–13		
November 21	at Texas Tech	No. 17	Tech Field; Lubbock, TX	T 0–0	7,000	
November 26	at Howard Payne*		Brownwood, TX	W 12–0	6,000	
January 1, 1943	vs. Second Air Force*		Kidd Field; El Paso, TX (Sun Bowl)	L 7–13	16,000	
*Non-conference game; Rankings from AP Poll released prior to the game

== Rankings ==
Ranking movements Legend: ██ Increase in ranking ██ Decrease in ranking — = Not ranked
	Week							
Poll	1	2	3	4	5	6	7	Final
AP	—	—	—	—	19	17	—	—
