= 1942 Notre Dame Fighting Irish football team =

American college football season

1942 Notre Dame Fighting Irish football
- Conference: Independent

Ranking
- AP: No. 6
- Record: 7–2–2
- Head coach: Frank Leahy (2nd season)
- Captain: George Murphy
- Home stadium: Notre Dame Stadium

1942 Midwestern college football independents records
	Conf.			Overall
Team	W	L	T	W		L		T
Central Michigan		–		6	–	0	–	0
Western Michigan		–		5	–	1	–	0
Cincinnati		–		8	–	2	–	0
Dayton		–		8	–	2	–	0
Marquette		–		7	–	2	–	0
No. 6 Notre Dame		–		7	–	2	–	2
Ohio		–		5	–	3	–	0
Detroit		–		5	–	4	–	0
Wichita		–		5	–	4	–	0
Michigan State		–		4	–	3	–	2
Michigan State Normal		–		3	–	3	–	1
Ohio Wesleyan		–		4	–	4	–	0
Xavier		–		4	–	5	–	0
Carthage		–		3	–	4	–	0
Miami (OH)		–		3	–	6	–	0
Wayne		–		1	–	6	–	1
Akron		–		0	–	7	–	2
Michigan Tech		–		0	–	3	–	0
Rankings from AP Poll

The 1942 Notre Dame Fighting Irish football team was an American football team that represented the University of Notre Dame as an independent during the 1942 college football season. In their second year under head coach Frank Leahy, the team compiled a 7–2–2 record, outscored opponents by a total of 184 to 99, and was ranked No. 6 in the final AP poll.

The team ranked eighth nationally with 1,039 passing yards. Angelo Bertelli was responsible for all of the team's passing yardage and ranked seventh nationally in individual passing yards.

End Bob Dove was a consensus pick on the 1942 All-America college football team. Angelo Bertelli was selected as a first-team All-American by Look magazine.

== Schedule ==
Date	Opponent	Rank	Site	Result	Attendance	Source
September 26	at Wisconsin		Camp Randall Stadium; Madison, WI	T 7–7	23,243	
October 3	Georgia Tech		Notre Dame Stadium; Notre Dame, IN (rivalry)	L 6–13	20,545	
October 10	Stanford		Notre Dame Stadium; Notre Dame, IN (rivalry)	W 27–0	22,374	
October 17	Iowa Pre-Flight		Notre Dame Stadium; Notre Dame, IN	W 28–0	26,800	
October 24	at No. 5 Illinois	No. 8	Memorial Stadium; Champaign, IL	W 21–14	43,476	
October 31	vs. Navy	No. 4	Municipal Stadium; Cleveland, OH (rivalry)	W 9–0	66,699	
November 7	vs. No. 19 Army	No. 4	Yankee Stadium; Bronx, NY (rivalry)	W 13–0	74,946	
November 14	No. 6 Michigan	No. 4	Notre Dame Stadium; Notre Dame, IN (rivalry)	L 20–32	54,379	
November 21	Northwestern	No. 8	Notre Dame Stadium; Notre Dame, IN (rivalry)	W 27–20	26,098	
November 28	at No. 14 USC	No. 8	Los Angeles Memorial Coliseum; Los Angeles, CA (rivalry)	W 13–0	94,519	
December 5	at Great Lakes Navy	No. 6	Soldier Field; Chicago, IL	T 13–13	19,225–35,000	
Rankings from AP Poll released prior to the game

== Rankings ==
Ranking movements Legend: ██ Increase in ranking ██ Decrease in ranking — = Not ranked ( ) = First-place votes
	Week							
Poll	1	2	3	4	5	6	7	Final
AP	—	8 (3)	4 (3)	4 (1)	4 (1)	8	8	6
