= 1943 Sun Bowl =

American college football game

Second Air Force Bombers	Hardin–Simmons Cowboys
(10–0–1)	(9–0–1)
Independent	Border Conference
13	7
Head coach: Red Reese	Head coach: Clark Jarnagin (interim)
	1	2	3	4	Total
Second Air Force	0	0	13	0	13
Hardin–Simmons	0	7	0	0	7
- Date: January 1, 1943
- Season: 1942
- Stadium: Kidd Field
- Location: El Paso, Texas

The 1942 Sun Bowl was a college football postseason bowl game between the Second Air Force Bombers and the Hardin–Simmons Cowboys.

== Background ==
Both teams were undefeated going into this game. The Border Conference champion Cowboys led by Rudy “Little Doc” Mobley, who had rushed for 1,281 yards and set an NCAA record. The Cowboys were without their coach Warren B. Woodson, who was called into duty prior to the game, leaving it up to assistant coach Clark Jarnagin to coach the game. At 28, he would be the youngest head coach in a bowl game. The Bombers were champions of the Pacific Coast Service, with highlights being a tie with Washington State and a win over Arizona. The team was stationed in Spokane, Washington.

== Game summary ==
Second Air Force had the ball at their own nine after intercepting the Cowboys' pass. But they could not get a first down, and punted a short punt - to their own 19. Camp Wilson scored on a touchdown run on the next play to give them a 7-0 lead. One quarter later, Victor Spadaccini gave the Bombers a narrowing of the lead on his touchdown dive. But the extra point fell short, leaving it 7-6. After Hardin-Simmons was driven back on two fifteen yard penalties, the Bombers took over. Harold Van Avery worked with Spadaccini in a combined rushing/passing attack, with Van Avery scoring the touchdown that proved to be the winning points. Hardin-Simmons rushed for just 148 yards with Mobley held to 44 yards in 11 attempts against 205 pound linemen of Second Air Force. The Bombers passed for 176 yards, while the Cowboys threw for only 41. Van Avery threw 4-of-7 passes for 163 yards and rushed for 53 yards on 14 carries. Wilson ran for 104 yards on 24 carries for the Cowboys.

== Aftermath ==
The Cowboys played in four bowl games before the decade ended - with three in one year. The Bombers were stationed to Colorado Springs, Colorado the following year.
