= 1942 Ohio Bobcats football team =

American college football season

1942 Ohio Bobcats football
- Conference: Independent
- Record: 5–3
- Head coach: Don Peden (19th season)
- Home stadium: Ohio Stadium

1942 Midwestern college football independents records
	Conf.			Overall
Team	W	L	T	W		L		T
Central Michigan		–		6	–	0	–	0
Western Michigan		–		5	–	1	–	0
Cincinnati		–		8	–	2	–	0
Dayton		–		8	–	2	–	0
Marquette		–		7	–	2	–	0
No. 6 Notre Dame		–		7	–	2	–	2
Ohio		–		5	–	3	–	0
Detroit		–		5	–	4	–	0
Wichita		–		5	–	4	–	0
Michigan State		–		4	–	3	–	2
Michigan State Normal		–		3	–	3	–	1
Ohio Wesleyan		–		4	–	4	–	0
Xavier		–		4	–	5	–	0
Carthage		–		3	–	4	–	0
Miami (OH)		–		3	–	6	–	0
Wayne		–		1	–	6	–	1
Akron		–		0	–	7	–	2
Michigan Tech		–		0	–	3	–	0
Rankings from AP Poll

The 1942 Ohio Bobcats football team was an American football team that represented Ohio University as an independent during the 1942 college football season. In their 19th season under head coach Don Peden, the Bobcats compiled a 5–3 record and outscored opponents by a total of 144 to 107.

Ohio was ranked at No. 136 (out of 590 college and military teams) in the final rankings under the Litkenhous Difference by Score System for 1942.

== Schedule ==
Date	Opponent	Site	Result	Attendance	Source
October 2	Akron	Ohio Stadium; Athens, OH	W 39–0		
October 10	Butler	Ohio Stadium; Athens, OH	W 6–0		
October 17	at Cincinnati	Nippert Stadium; Cincinnati, OH	L 7–26		
October 24	Ohio Wesleyan^{†}	Ohio Stadium; Athens, OH	W 26–14	7,000	
October 31	at Miami (OH)	Oxford, OH (rivalry)	W 39–13	6,000	
November 6	at Western Reserve	Shaw Stadium; East Cleveland, OH	L 7–20	9,000	
November 15	Xavier	Ohio Stadium; Athens, OH	W 20–14	8,000	
November 26	at Dayton	University of Dayton Stadium; Dayton, OH	L 0–20	4,000	
^{†}Homecoming
