= 1942 Akron Zippers football team =

American college football season

1942 Akron Zippers football
- Conference: Independent
- Record: 0–7–2
- Head coach: Otis Douglas (2nd season)
- Home stadium: Rubber Bowl

1942 Midwestern college football independents records
	Conf.			Overall
Team	W	L	T	W		L		T
Central Michigan		–		6	–	0	–	0
Western Michigan		–		5	–	1	–	0
Cincinnati		–		8	–	2	–	0
Dayton		–		8	–	2	–	0
Marquette		–		7	–	2	–	0
No. 6 Notre Dame		–		7	–	2	–	2
Ohio		–		5	–	3	–	0
Detroit		–		5	–	4	–	0
Wichita		–		5	–	4	–	0
Michigan State		–		4	–	3	–	2
Michigan State Normal		–		3	–	3	–	1
Ohio Wesleyan		–		4	–	4	–	0
Xavier		–		4	–	5	–	0
Carthage		–		3	–	4	–	0
Miami (OH)		–		3	–	6	–	0
Wayne		–		1	–	6	–	1
Akron		–		0	–	7	–	2
Michigan Tech		–		0	–	3	–	0
Rankings from AP Poll

The 1942 Akron Zippers football team was an American football team that represented the University of Akron as an independent during the 1942 college football season. In its second and final season under head coach Otis Douglas, the team compiled a 0–7–2 record and was outscored by a total of 186 to 26.

Akron was ranked at No. 397 (out of 590 college and military teams) in the final rankings under the Litkenhous Difference by Score System for 1942.

The team played its home games at the Rubber Bowl in Akron, Ohio.

Following the 1942 season, Douglas left the school for service in the United States Navy's V-5 training program for air cadets. The suspended its participation in intercollegiate football and did not field another team until 1946.

== Schedule ==
Date	Opponent	Site	Result	Attendance	Source
September 18	Western Reserve	Rubber Bowl; Akron, OH	L 0–39		
September 25	Muskingum	Rubber Bowl; Akron, OH	T 7–7		
October 2	at Ohio	Ohio Stadium; Athens, OH	L 0–39		
October 9	Eastern Kentucky	Rubber Bowl; Akron, OH	L 0–6		
October 16	at Ohio Wesleyan	Delaware, OH	L 7–19		
October 31	Baldwin Wallace	Rubber Bowl; Akron, OH	L 0–25		
November 7	at Wayne	University of Detroit Stadium; Detroit, MI	L 6–28	3,500	
November 14	Kent State	Rubber Bowl; Akron, OH (rivalry)	L 6–23		
November 26	John Carroll	Rubber Bowl; Akron, OH	T 0–0		
