= 1942 SMU Mustangs football team =

American college football season

1942 SMU Mustangs football
- Conference: Southwest Conference
- Record: 3–6–2 (1–4–1 SWC)
- Head coach: Jimmy Stewart (1st season)
- Captains: Clarence Booth; Orville Johnson; Kelly Simpson
- Home stadium: Ownby Stadium

1942 Southwest Conference football standings
	Conf.					Overall
Team	W		L		T	W		L		T
No. 11 Texas $	5	–	1	–	0	9	–	2	–	0
Rice	4	–	1	–	1	7	–	2	–	1
TCU	4	–	2	–	0	7	–	3	–	0
Baylor	3	–	2	–	1	6	–	4	–	1
Texas A&M	2	–	3	–	1	4	–	5	–	1
SMU	1	–	4	–	1	3	–	6	–	2
Arkansas	0	–	6	–	0	3	–	7	–	0
Rankings from AP Poll

The 1942 SMU Mustangs football team was an American football team that represented Southern Methodist University (SMU) as a member of the Southwest Conference (SWC) during the 1942 college football season. In their first season under head coach Jimmy Stewart, the Mustangs compiled a 3–6–2 record (1–4–1 against conference opponents) and were outscored by a total of 133 to 126.

SMU was ranked at No. 75 (out of 590 college and military teams) in the final rankings under the Litkenhous Difference by Score System for 1942.

The team played its home games at Ownby Stadium in the University Park suburb of Dallas.

== Schedule ==
Date	Opponent	Site	Result	Attendance	Source
September 26	North Texas State Teachers*	Ownby Stadium; University Park, TX (rivalry)	W 26–7	7,000	
October 3	at Pittsburgh*	Pitt Stadium; Pittsburgh, PA	L 7–20	15,000	
October 10	vs. Hardin–Simmons*	Alamo Stadium; San Antonio, TX	L 6–7	20,000	
October 16	Temple*	Cotton Bowl; Dallas, TX	T 6–6		
October 24	Corpus Christi NAS*	Ownby Stadium; University Park, TX	W 21–6		
October 31	at No. 17 Texas	War Memorial Stadium; Austin, TX	L 7–21		
November 7	Texas A&M	Ownby Stadium; University Park, TX	L 20–27		
November 14	Arkansas	Ownby Stadium; University Park, TX	W 14–6		
November 21	at Baylor	Municipal Stadium; Waco, TX	T 6–6		
November 28	TCU	Ownby Stadium; University Park, TX (rivalry)	L 6–14	10,000	
December 5	at Rice	Rice Field; Houston, TX (rivalry)	L 7–13		
*Non-conference game; Rankings from AP Poll released prior to the game
