= 1942 Arizona State Bulldogs football team =

American college football season

1942 Arizona State Bulldogs football
- Conference: Border Conference
- Record: 2–8 (2–5 Border)
- Head coach: Hilman Walker (1st season)
- Home stadium: Goodwin Stadium

1942 Border Conference football standings
	Conf.					Overall
Team	W		L		T	W		L		T
Hardin–Simmons +	4	–	0	–	1	9	–	1	–	1
Texas Tech +	3	–	0	–	1	4	–	5	–	1
West Texas State	5	–	2	–	0	7	–	2	–	0
Arizona	4	–	2	–	0	6	–	4	–	0
Texas Mines	4	–	3	–	0	5	–	4	–	0
New Mexico	3	–	4	–	0	4	–	5	–	2
Arizona State	2	–	5	–	0	2	–	8	–	0
Arizona State–Flagstaff	1	–	4	–	0	1	–	5	–	0
New Mexico A&M	0	–	6	–	0	1	–	8	–	0
+ – Conference co-champions

The 1942 Arizona State Bulldogs football team was an American football team that represented Arizona State Teachers College (later renamed Arizona State University) in the Border Conference during the 1942 college football season. In their first season under head coach Hilman Walker, the Bulldogs compiled a 2–8 record (2–5 against Border opponents) and were outscored by their opponents by a combined total of 256 to 53.

Arizona State was ranked at No. 375 (out of 590 college and military teams) in the final rankings under the Litkenhous Difference by Score System for 1942.

== Schedule ==
Date	Opponent	Site	Result	Attendance	Source
September 27	at San Francisco*	Kezar Stadium; San Francisco, CA	L 6–54	12,000	
October 3	at West Texas State	Buffalo Stadium; Canyon, TX	L 0–28		
October 10	Arizona	Goodwin Stadium; Tempe, AZ (Territorial Cup)	L 0–23		
October 17	Hardin–Simmons	Goodwin Stadium; Tempe, AZ	L Forfeit		
October 24	New Mexico A&M	Goodwin Stadium; Tempe, AZ	W 20–0	2,000	
October 31	Santa Ana AAB*	Goodwin Stadium; Tempe, AZ	L 0–40		
November 7	at Texas Mines	El Paso H.S. Stadium; El Paso, TX	L 6–40		
November 15	at Arizona State–Flagstaff	Skidmore Field; Flagstaff, AZ	W 14–2		
November 21	Albuquerque AAB*	Goodwin Stadium; Tempe, AZ	L 0–12		
November 28	at New Mexico	Hilltop Stadium; Albuquerque, NM	L 7–35		
*Non-conference game
