= 1942 Washington University Bears football team =

American college football season

1942 Washington University Bears football
- Conference: Missouri Valley Conference
- Record: 5–5 (2–3 MVC)
- Head coach: Tom Gorman (1st season)
- Home stadium: Francis Field

1942 Missouri Valley Conference football standings
	Conf.					Overall
Team	W		L		T	W		L		T
No. 4 Tulsa $	5	–	0	–	0	10	–	1	–	0
Oklahoma A&M	4	–	1	–	0	6	–	3	–	1
Washington University	2	–	3	–	0	5	–	5	–	0
Saint Louis	2	–	3	–	0	4	–	5	–	0
Creighton	1	–	4	–	0	5	–	4	–	0
Drake	1	–	4	–	0	3	–	7	–	0
$ – Conference champion; Rankings from AP Poll

The 1942 Washington University Bears football team represented Washington University in St. Louis as a member of the Missouri Valley Conference (MVC) during the 1942 college football season. Led by Tom Gorman in his first and only season as head coach, the Bears compiled an overall record of 5–5 with a mark of 2–3 in conference play, tying for third place in the MVC. The team played home games at Francis Field in St. Louis. Washington University did not field another football team in the 1947 season.

== Schedule ==
Date	Time	Opponent	Site	Result	Attendance	Source
September 19		at Iowa*	Iowa Stadium; Iowa City, IA	L 7–26	8,200–10,000	
September 26	2:30 p.m.	Cape Girardeau*	Francis Field; St. Louis, MO	W 26–7	1,000	
October 2	8:15 p.m.	at Creighton	Creighton Stadium; Omaha, NE	W 13–12	10,000	
October 10	2:30 p.m.	Wichita	Francis Field; St. Louis, MO	W 27–6	6,000	
October 17	8:15 p.m.	at Tulsa	Skelly Field; Tulsa, OK	L 0–40	8,000	
October 24	2:30 p.m.	at Oklahoma A&M	Lewis Field; Stillwater, OK	L 7–40	4,500	
November 7		at Kansas*	Memorial Stadium; Lawrence, KS	L 7–19	2,400	
November 14	2:30 p.m.	Drake^{†}	Francis Field; St. Louis, MO	W 14–7	5,000	
November 21	2:30 p.m.	Missouri Mines*	Francis Field; St. Louis, MO	W 19–6	2,000	
November 26	2:30 p.m.	at Saint Louis	Walsh Stadium; St. Louis, MO	L 0–26	13,192	
*Non-conference game; ^{†}Homecoming; All times are in Central time
