= 1942 Arizona State–Flagstaff Lumberjacks football team =

American college football season

1942 Arizona State–Flagstaff Lumberjacks football
- Conference: Border Conference
- Record: 1–5 (1–4 Border)
- Head coach: Maurice Moulder (3rd season)
- Home stadium: Skidmore Field

1942 Border Conference football standings
	Conf.					Overall
Team	W		L		T	W		L		T
Hardin–Simmons +	4	–	0	–	1	9	–	1	–	1
Texas Tech +	3	–	0	–	1	4	–	5	–	1
West Texas State	5	–	2	–	0	7	–	2	–	0
Arizona	4	–	2	–	0	6	–	4	–	0
Texas Mines	4	–	3	–	0	5	–	4	–	0
New Mexico	3	–	4	–	0	4	–	5	–	2
Arizona State	2	–	5	–	0	2	–	8	–	0
Arizona State–Flagstaff	1	–	4	–	0	1	–	5	–	0
New Mexico A&M	0	–	6	–	0	1	–	8	–	0
+ – Conference co-champions

The 1942 Arizona State–Flagstaff Lumberjacks football team represented Arizona State Teachers College at Flagstaff (now known as Northern Arizona University) as a member of the Border Conference during the 1942 college football season. Led by third-year head coach Maurice Moulder, the Lumberjacks compiled an overall record of 1–5, with a conference record of 1–4, and finished eighth in the Border.

Arizona State–Flagstaff was ranked at No. 423 (out of 590 college and military teams) in the final rankings under the Litkenhous Difference by Score System for 1942.

== Schedule ==
Date	Opponent	Site	Result	Source
September 25	at New Mexico	Hilltop Stadium; Albuquerque, NM	L 6–26	
October 3	Redlands*	Skidmore Field; Flagstaff, AZ	L 2–6	
October 24	West Texas State	Skidmore Field; Flagstaff, AZ	L 7–27	
October 31	Texas Mines	Skidmore Field; Flagstaff, AZ	L 0–20	
November 15	Arizona State	Skidmore Field; Flagstaff, AZ	L 2–14	
November 21	at New Mexico A&M	Quesenberry Field; Las Cruces, NM	W 3–0	
*Non-conference game
