= 1942 Wichita Shockers football team =

American college football season

1942 Wichita Shockers football
- Conference: Independent
- Record: 5–4
- Head coach: Ralph Graham (1st season)

1942 Midwestern college football independents records
	Conf.			Overall
Team	W	L	T	W		L		T
Central Michigan		–		6	–	0	–	0
Western Michigan		–		5	–	1	–	0
Cincinnati		–		8	–	2	–	0
Dayton		–		8	–	2	–	0
Marquette		–		7	–	2	–	0
No. 6 Notre Dame		–		7	–	2	–	2
Ohio		–		5	–	3	–	0
Detroit		–		5	–	4	–	0
Wichita		–		5	–	4	–	0
Michigan State		–		4	–	3	–	2
Michigan State Normal		–		3	–	3	–	1
Ohio Wesleyan		–		4	–	4	–	0
Xavier		–		4	–	5	–	0
Carthage		–		3	–	4	–	0
Miami (OH)		–		3	–	6	–	0
Wayne		–		1	–	6	–	1
Akron		–		0	–	7	–	2
Michigan Tech		–		0	–	3	–	0
Rankings from AP Poll

The 1942 Wichita Shockers football team was an American football team that represented Wichita University (now known as Wichita State University) as an independent during the 1942 college football season. In their first season under head coach Ralph Graham, the Shockers compiled a 5–4 record, including its first victory over Kansas State since 1904, and outscored all opponents by a total of 125 to 106.

Wichita was ranked at No. 189 (out of 590 college and military teams) in the final rankings under the Litkenhous Difference by Score System for 1942.

== Schedule ==
Date	Time	Opponent	Site	Result	Attendance	Source
September 26		at Arkansas	Razorback Stadium; Fayetteville, AR	L 0–27	2,500	
October 3		St. Benedict's	Wichita, KS	W 18–6		
October 10	2:30 p.m.	at Washington University	Francis Field; St. Louis, MO	L 6–27	6,000	
October 16		at Washburn	Topeka, KS	W 32–0		
October 24		Fort Riley	Wichita, KS	L 0–6	3,000	
October 31		Kansas State	Wichita, KS	W 9–0	5,000	
November 7		Emporia State	Wichita, KS	W 27–6		
November 14		Southwestern (KS)	Wichita, KS	W 20–13		
November 26		Utah State	Wichita, KS	L 3–21	4,500	
All times are in Central time

== After the season ==
=== NFL draft ===
The following Shocker was selected in the 1943 NFL draft following the season.

Round	Pick	Player	Position	NFL club
15	139	Lyle Sturdy	Back	Chicago Bears
