= 1942 West Texas State Buffaloes football team =

American college football season

1942 West Texas State Buffaloes football
- Conference: Border Conference
- Record: 7–2 (5–2 Border)
- Head coach: Gus Miller (1st season)
- Home stadium: Buffalo Stadium

1942 Border Conference football standings
	Conf.					Overall
Team	W		L		T	W		L		T
Hardin–Simmons +	4	–	0	–	1	9	–	1	–	1
Texas Tech +	3	–	0	–	1	4	–	5	–	1
West Texas State	5	–	2	–	0	7	–	2	–	0
Arizona	4	–	2	–	0	6	–	4	–	0
Texas Mines	4	–	3	–	0	5	–	4	–	0
New Mexico	3	–	4	–	0	4	–	5	–	2
Arizona State	2	–	5	–	0	2	–	8	–	0
Arizona State–Flagstaff	1	–	4	–	0	1	–	5	–	0
New Mexico A&M	0	–	6	–	0	1	–	8	–	0
+ – Conference co-champions

The 1942 West Texas State Buffaloes football team was an American football team that represented West Texas State College (now known as West Texas A&M University) in the Border Conference during the 1942 college football season. In its first season under head coach Gus Miller, the team compiled a 7–2 record (5–2 against conference opponents) and outscored all opponents by a total of 130 to 112. The team played its home games at Buffalo Stadium in Canyon, Texas.

== Schedule ==
Date	Opponent	Site	Result	Attendance	Source
September 26	at Texas Tech	Tech Field; Lubbock, TX	L 0–39	6,000	
October 3	Arizona State	Buffalo Stadium; Canyon, TX	W 28–0		
October 9	Albuquerque AAB*	Buffalo Stadium; Canyon, TX	W 18–13		
October 17	Texas Mines	Buffalo Stadium; Canyon, TX	W 7–0		
October 24	at Arizona State–Flagstaff	Skidmore Field; Flagstaff, AZ	W 27–7		
October 31	at New Mexico A&M	Quesenberry Field; Las Cruces, NM	W 23–0		
November 7	Hardin–Simmons^{†}	Buffalo Stadium; Canyon, TX	L 0–40		
November 14	at New Mexico	Hilltop Stadium; Albuquerque, NM	W 13–7		
November 20	Lubbock AAF*	Buffalo Stadium; Canyon, TX	W 14–6		
*Non-conference game; ^{†}Homecoming
