= 1942 Rice Owls football team =

American college football season

1942 Rice Owls football
- Conference: Southwest Conference
- Record: 7–2–1 (4–1–1 SWC)
- Head coach: Jess Neely (3rd season)
- Home stadium: Rice Field

1942 Southwest Conference football standings
	Conf.					Overall
Team	W		L		T	W		L		T
No. 11 Texas $	5	–	1	–	0	9	–	2	–	0
Rice	4	–	1	–	1	7	–	2	–	1
TCU	4	–	2	–	0	7	–	3	–	0
Baylor	3	–	2	–	1	6	–	4	–	1
Texas A&M	2	–	3	–	1	4	–	5	–	1
SMU	1	–	4	–	1	3	–	6	–	2
Arkansas	0	–	6	–	0	3	–	7	–	0
Rankings from AP Poll

The 1942 Rice Owls football team was an American football team that represented Rice Institute as a member of the Southwest Conference (SWC) during the 1942 college football season. In its third season under head coach Jess Neely, the team compiled a 7–2–1 record (4–1–1 against SWC opponents) and outscored opponents by a total of 177 to 74.

Rice was ranked at No. 21 (out of 590 college and military teams) in the final rankings under the Litkenhous Difference by Score System for 1942.

== Schedule ==
Date	Opponent	Site	Result	Attendance	Source
September 26	Corpus Christi NAS*	Rice Field; Houston, TX	W 18–7	9,000	
October 3	LSU*	Rice Field; Houston, TX	W 27–14	20,000	
October 10	at Tulane*	Tulane Stadium; New Orleans, LA	L 7–18	25,000	
October 24	No. 15 Texas	Rice Field; Houston, TX (rivalry)	L 7–12	28,000	
October 31	Texas Tech*	Rice Field; Houston, TX	W 19–7	10,000	
November 7	at Arkansas	Razorback Stadium; Fayetteville, AR	W 40–9	4,000	
November 14	Texas A&M	Rice Field; Houston, TX	T 0–0	20,000	
November 21	No. 18 TCU	Rice Field; Houston, TX	W 21–0	14,000	
November 28	at Baylor	Municipal Stadium; Waco, TX	W 20–0	7,000	
December 5	SMU	Rice Field; Houston, TX (rivalry)	W 13–7		
*Non-conference game; Rankings from AP Poll released prior to the game
