= 1942 Michigan State Normal Hurons football team =

American college football season

1942 Michigan State Normal Hurons football
- Conference: Independent
- Record: 3–3–1
- Head coach: Elton Rynearson (21st season)
- Captains: Lowell W. Beach; Charles Nemeth
- Home stadium: Briggs Field

1942 Midwestern college football independents records
	Conf.			Overall
Team	W	L	T	W		L		T
Central Michigan		–		6	–	0	–	0
Western Michigan		–		5	–	1	–	0
Cincinnati		–		8	–	2	–	0
Dayton		–		8	–	2	–	0
Marquette		–		7	–	2	–	0
No. 6 Notre Dame		–		7	–	2	–	2
Ohio		–		5	–	3	–	0
Detroit		–		5	–	4	–	0
Wichita		–		5	–	4	–	0
Michigan State		–		4	–	3	–	2
Michigan State Normal		–		3	–	3	–	1
Ohio Wesleyan		–		4	–	4	–	0
Xavier		–		4	–	5	–	0
Carthage		–		3	–	4	–	0
Miami (OH)		–		3	–	6	–	0
Wayne		–		1	–	6	–	1
Akron		–		0	–	7	–	2
Michigan Tech		–		0	–	3	–	0
Rankings from AP Poll

The 1942 Michigan State Normal Hurons football team represented Michigan State Normal College (later renamed Eastern Michigan University) as an independent during the 1942 college football season. In their 21st season under head coach Elton Rynearson, the Hurons compiled a 3–3–1 record and were outscored by their opponents, 81 to 64. Lowell W. Beach and Charles Nemeth were the team captains. The team played its home games at Briggs Field on the school's campus in Ypsilanti, Michigan.

Michigan State Normal was ranked at No. 334 (out of 590 college and military teams) in the final rankings under the Litkenhous Difference by Score System for 1942.

== Schedule ==
Date	Opponent	Site	Result
September 25	at Alma	Alma, MI	L 6–14
October 1	Hope	Briggs Field; Ypsilanti, MI	W 13–9
October 9	Illinois State	Briggs Field; Ypsilanti, MI	W 14–7
October 15	at Central Michigan	Mount Pleasant, MI (rivalry)	L 0–14
October 23	Wayne ^{†}	Briggs Field; Ypsilanti, MI	T 12–12
October 29	Hillsdale	Briggs Field; Ypsilanti, MI	W 19–13
November 7	at Albion	Albion, MI	L 0–12
^{†}Homecoming
