= 1942 Saint Louis Billikens football team =

American college football season

1942 Saint Louis Billikens football
- Conference: Missouri Valley Conference
- Record: 4–5 (2–3 MVC)
- Head coach: Dukes Duford (3rd season)
- Home stadium: Edward J. Walsh Memorial Stadium

1942 Missouri Valley Conference football standings
	Conf.					Overall
Team	W		L		T	W		L		T
No. 4 Tulsa $	5	–	0	–	0	10	–	1	–	0
Oklahoma A&M	4	–	1	–	0	6	–	3	–	1
Washington University	2	–	3	–	0	5	–	5	–	0
Saint Louis	2	–	3	–	0	4	–	5	–	0
Creighton	1	–	4	–	0	5	–	4	–	0
Drake	1	–	4	–	0	3	–	7	–	0
$ – Conference champion; Rankings from AP Poll

The 1942 Saint Louis Billikens football team was an American football team that represented Saint Louis University as a member of the Missouri Valley Conference (MVC) during the 1942 college football season. In its third season under head coach Dukes Duford, the team compiled a 4–5 record and was outscored by a total of 215 to 110.

Saint Louis was ranked at No. 154 (out of 590 college and military teams) in the final rankings under the Litkenhous Difference by Score System for 1942.

The team played its home games at Edward J. Walsh Memorial Stadium in St. Louis.

== Schedule ==
Date	Time	Opponent	Site	Result	Attendance	Source
September 26		at Missouri*	Memorial Stadium; Columbia, MO	L 7–38		
October 2		Missouri Mines*	Walsh Memorial Stadium; St. Louis, MO	W 14–7		
October 10		at Drake	Drake Stadium; Des Moines, IA	L 9–19		
October 16		Miami (FL)*	Walsh Memorial Stadium; St. Louis, MO	L 6–31	7,000	
October 23		Tulsa	Walsh Memorial Stadium; St. Louis, MO	L 0–41	7,990	
November 1		Loyola (LA)*	Walsh Memorial Stadium; St. Louis, MO	W 20–6	6,545	
November 8		Creighton	Walsh Memorial Stadium; St. Louis, MO	W 21–19	6,204	
November 14		at Oklahoma A&M	Lewis Field; Stillwater, OK	L 7–54		
November 26	2:30 p.m.	Washington University	Walsh Stadium; St. Louis, MO	W 26–0	13,192	
*Non-conference game; All times are in Central time
