= 1942 Central Michigan Chippewas football team =

American college football season

1942 Central Michigan Chippewas football
- Conference: Independent
- Record: 6–0
- Head coach: Ron Finch (6th season)
- Home stadium: Alumni Field

1942 Midwestern college football independents records
	Conf.			Overall
Team	W	L	T	W		L		T
Central Michigan		–		6	–	0	–	0
Western Michigan		–		5	–	1	–	0
Cincinnati		–		8	–	2	–	0
Dayton		–		8	–	2	–	0
Marquette		–		7	–	2	–	0
No. 6 Notre Dame		–		7	–	2	–	2
Ohio		–		5	–	3	–	0
Detroit		–		5	–	4	–	0
Wichita		–		5	–	4	–	0
Michigan State		–		4	–	3	–	2
Michigan State Normal		–		3	–	3	–	1
Ohio Wesleyan		–		4	–	4	–	0
Xavier		–		4	–	5	–	0
Carthage		–		3	–	4	–	0
Miami (OH)		–		3	–	6	–	0
Wayne		–		1	–	6	–	1
Akron		–		0	–	7	–	2
Michigan Tech		–		0	–	3	–	0
Rankings from AP Poll

The 1942 Central Michigan Chippewas football team represented Central Michigan College of Education, later renamed Central Michigan University, as an independent during the 1942 college football season. The 1942 team was the first undefeated, untied football team in the school's history. In their sixth season under head coach Ron Finch, the Chippewas compiled a 6–0 record, shut out three opponents, held five of six opponents to fewer than seven points, and outscored all opponents by a combined total of 93 to 21. The team defeated Northern Michigan (21–0), Grand Rapids Union (6–2, 20–6), Eastern Michigan (14–0), Ball State (19–13), and Wayne State (13–0).

Right guard Warren Schmakel and end Don Provencher were the team co-captains. Schmakel was named as a first-team honoree on the Little All-America team, and fullback Harry Kaczynski received honorable mention on the same team.

Central Michigan was ranked at No. 200 (out of 590 college and military teams) in the final rankings under the Litkenhous Difference by Score System for 1942.

For 15 year prior to 1942, Central Michigan's athletic teams had been known as the "Bearcats". In January 1942, the school's student council voted to rename the teams the "Chippewas", because the area around the campus had for many years been the home of the Chippewa tribe of Michigan Indians.

== Schedule ==
Date	Opponent	Site	Result	Source
October 3	at Northern Michigan	Marquette, MI	W 21–0	
October 9	University of Grand Rapids	Alumni Field; Mount Pleasant, MI	W 6–2	
October 16	Michigan State Normal	Alumni Field; Mount Pleasant, MI(rivalry)	W 14–0	
October 24	Ball State^{†}	Alumni Field; Mount Pleasant, MI	W 19–13	
October 30	Wayne	Alumni Field; Mount Pleasant, MI	W 13–0	
November 7	at University of Grand Rapids	Grand Rapids, MI	W 20–6	
^{†}Homecoming
