= 1942 Tulsa Golden Hurricane football team =

American college football season

1942 Tulsa Golden Hurricane football

MVC champion

Sugar Bowl, L 7–14 vs. Tennessee
- Conference: Missouri Valley Conference

Ranking
- AP: No. 4
- Record: 10–1 (5–0 MVC)
- Head coach: Henry Frnka (2nd season)
- Home stadium: Skelly Field

1942 Missouri Valley Conference football standings
	Conf.					Overall
Team	W		L		T	W		L		T
No. 4 Tulsa $	5	–	0	–	0	10	–	1	–	0
Oklahoma A&M	4	–	1	–	0	6	–	3	–	1
Washington University	2	–	3	–	0	5	–	5	–	0
Saint Louis	2	–	3	–	0	4	–	5	–	0
Creighton	1	–	4	–	0	5	–	4	–	0
Drake	1	–	4	–	0	3	–	7	–	0
$ – Conference champion; Rankings from AP Poll

The 1942 Tulsa Golden Hurricane team was an American football team that represented the University of Tulsa in the Missouri Valley Conference (MVC) during the 1942 college football season. In their second year under head coach Henry Frnka, the Golden Hurricane compiled a 10–0 record (5–0 against MVC opponents) in the regular season before losing to Tennessee in the 1943 Sugar Bowl. The team was ranked No. 4 in the final AP poll.

Tulsa led the nation in scoring (39.5 points per game) and passing offense (233.9 yards per game) and ranked second in total offense (426.1 yards per game) and eighth in total defense (148.7 yards per game).

Quarterback Glenn Dobbs ranked fourth nationally with 1,427 yards of total offense and eighth nationally with 1,066 passing yards. He was selected as a first-team All-American by the Associated Press, International News Service, Newspaper Enterprise Association, and Newsweek magazine and was later inducted into the College Football Hall of Fame.

== Schedule ==
Date	Time	Opponent	Rank	Site	Result	Attendance	Source
September 27		Waco Army Air Field*		Skelly Field; Tulsa, OK	W 84–0	7,500	
October 3		Oklahoma*		Skelly Field; Tulsa, OK	W 23–0	12,000	
October 11		Randolph Field*		Skelly Field; Tulsa, OK	W 68–0	5,000	
October 17	8:15 p.m.	Washington University		Skelly Field; Tulsa, OK	W 40–0	8,000	
October 23		at Saint Louis		Walsh Memorial Stadium; St. Louis, MO	W 41–0	7,990	
October 30		at Drake	No. 15	Drake Stadium; Des Moines, IA	W 40–0	2,500	
November 7		Oklahoma A&M	No. 12	Skelly Field; Tulsa, OK (rivalry)	W 34–6	13,000	
November 14		Baylor*^{†}	No. 9	Skelly Field; Tulsa, OK	W 24–0	15,000–16,000	
November 21		at Creighton	No. 6	Creighton Stadium; Omaha, NE	W 33–19	9,000	
November 2		Arkansas*	No. 6	Skelly Field; Tulsa, OK	W 40–7	17,000–18,000	
January 1, 1943		vs. No. 10 Tennessee*	No. 4	Tulane Stadium; New Orleans, LA (Sugar Bowl)	L 7–14	70,000	
*Non-conference game; ^{†}Homecoming; Rankings from AP Poll released prior to the game; All times are in Central time

== Rankings ==
The AP released their first poll on October 12. The Golden Hurricane made their first appearance as a ranked team on October 26.

Ranking movements Legend: ██ Increase in ranking ██ Decrease in ranking — = Not ranked т = Tied with team above or below ( ) = First-place votes
	Week							
Poll	1	2	3	4	5	6	7	Final
AP	—	—	15т	12	9 (1)	6 (2)	6 (1)	4 (4)

== After the season ==
=== 1943 NFL draft ===
The following Golden Hurricane players were selecfted in the 1943 NFL draft following the season.

Round	Pick	Player	Position	NFL club
1	3	Glenn Dobbs	Running back	Chicago Cardinals
16	146	N.A. Keithley	Back	New York Giants
25	233	Cal Purdin	Back	Chicago Cardinals
26	246	Maurice Hail	Guard	New York Giants
