= Walter Milner =

American football player and coach (1913–1965)

Biographical details
- Born: January 19, 1913; Bell County, Texas, U.S.
- Died: November 14, 1965 (aged 52) near El Paso, Texas, U.S.

Playing career

Football
- 1931–1933: Texas Mines

Coaching career (HC unless noted)

Football
- 1937: El Paso Austin HS (TX)
- 1942: Texas Mines

Head coaching record
- Overall: 5–4 (college)

Walter Jackson "Chule" Milner (January 19, 1913 – November 14, 1965) was an American football player and coach. He served as the head football coach at the College of Mines and Metallurgy of the University of Texas—now known as the University of Texas at El Paso (UTEP)—in 1942, after playing for the Miners from 1931 to 1933. Milner had previously served as the head football coach at Austin High School in El Paso, Texas, where he led his 1937 team to an undefeated season.

Milner was killed on November 14, 1965, in an automobile accident near El Paso.

== Head coaching record ==
=== College ===
Year	Team	Overall	Conference	Standing	Bowl/playoffs
Texas Mines Miners (Border Conference) (1942)
1942	Texas Mines	5–4	4–3	5th	
Texas Mines:		5–4	4–3		
Total:		5–4			
