= 1942 Texas Tech Red Raiders football team =

American college football season

1942 Texas Tech Red Raiders football
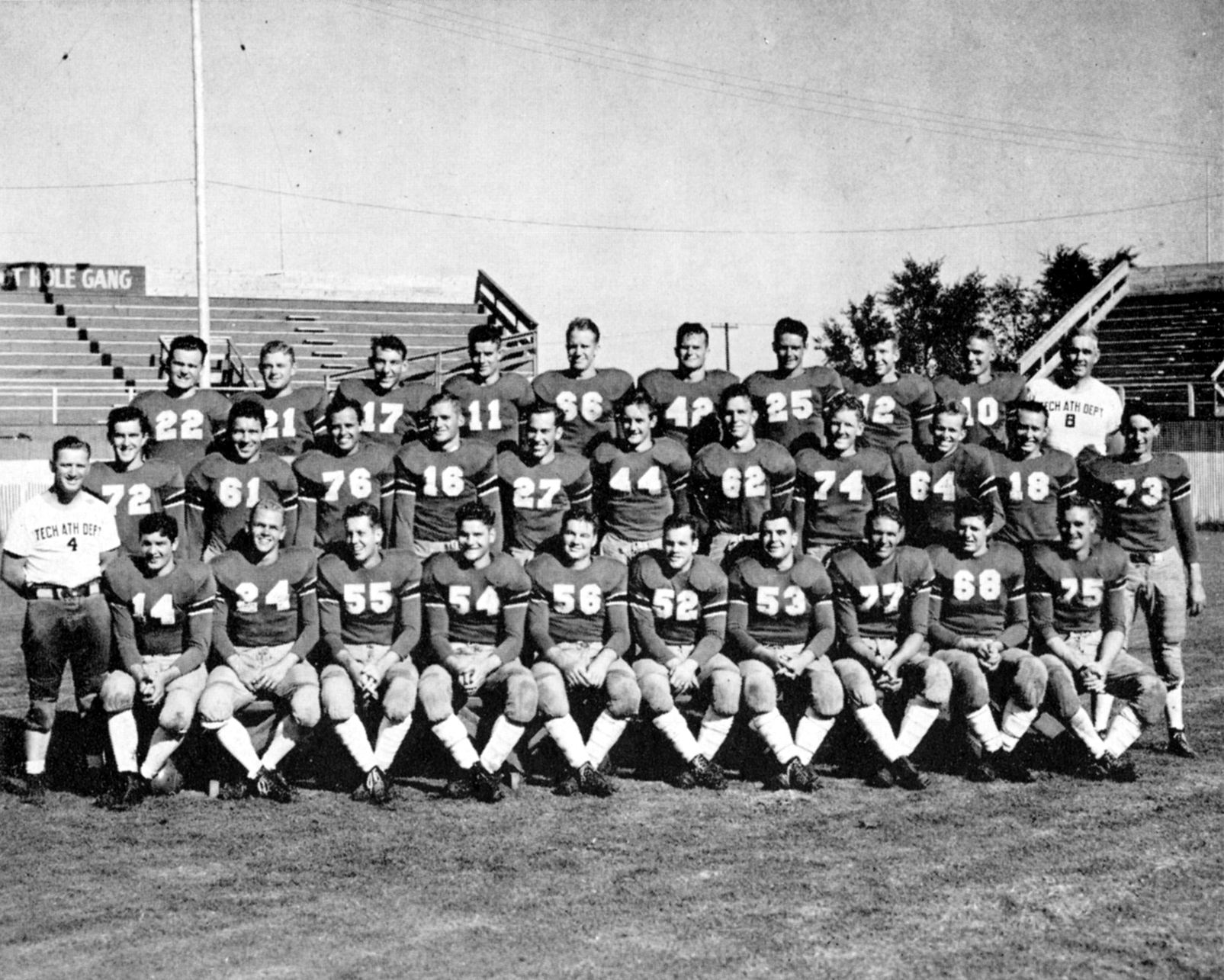

Border co-champion
- Conference: Border Conference
- Record: 4–5–1 (3–0–1 Border)
- Head coach: Dell Morgan (2nd season)
- Offensive scheme: Single-wing
- Base defense: 6–2
- Home stadium: Tech Field

1942 Border Conference football standings
	Conf.					Overall
Team	W		L		T	W		L		T
Hardin–Simmons +	4	–	0	–	1	9	–	1	–	1
Texas Tech +	3	–	0	–	1	4	–	5	–	1
West Texas State	5	–	2	–	0	7	–	2	–	0
Arizona	4	–	2	–	0	6	–	4	–	0
Texas Mines	4	–	3	–	0	5	–	4	–	0
New Mexico	3	–	4	–	0	4	–	5	–	2
Arizona State	2	–	5	–	0	2	–	8	–	0
Arizona State–Flagstaff	1	–	4	–	0	1	–	5	–	0
New Mexico A&M	0	–	6	–	0	1	–	8	–	0
+ – Conference co-champions

The 1942 Texas Tech Red Raiders football team represented Texas Technological College—now known as Texas Tech University—as a member of the Border Conference during the 1942 college football season. Led by second-year head coach Dell Morgan, the Red Raiders compiled an overall record of 4–5–1 with a mark of 3–0–1 in conference play, sharing the Border Conference title with Hardin–Simmons. This was Texas Tech's The second Border Conference championship.

Texas Tech was ranked at No. 71 (out of 590 college and military teams) in the final rankings under the Litkenhous Difference by Score System for 1942.

The team played home games at Tech Field in Lubbock, Texas.

== Schedule ==
Date	Opponent	Site	Result	Attendance	Source
September 26	West Texas State	Tech Field; Lubbock, TX	W 39–0	6,000	
October 3	at Texas A&M*	Kyle Field; College Station, TX (rivalry)	L 0–19	10,000	
October 10	Oklahoma A&M*	Tech Field; Lubbock, TX	L 6–9	6,000	
October 17	Baylor*	Tech Field; Lubbock, TX (rivalry)	L 7–14	8,000	
October 24	at New Mexico	Hilltop Stadium; Albuquerque, NM	W 20–0	4,500	
October 31	at Rice*	Rice Field; Houston, TX	L 7–19	10,000	
November 7	TCU*^{†}	Tech Field; Lubbock, TX (rivalry)	W 13–6	10,000	
November 14	at Creighton*	Creighton Stadium; Omaha, NE	L 6–13		
November 21	No. 17 Hardin–Simmons	Tech Field; Lubbock, TX	T 0–0	7,000	
November 26	at Arizona	Arizona Stadium; Tucson, AZ	W 13–7	8,000	
*Non-conference game; ^{†}Homecoming; Rankings from AP Poll released prior to the game
