= 1942 Ohio Northern Polar Bears football team =

American college football season

1942 Ohio Northern Polar Bears football

OAC champion
- Conference: Ohio Athletic Conference
- Record: 6–1–1 (5–0–1 OAC)
- Head coach: Millard Murphy (1st season)

1942 Ohio Athletic Conference football standings
| | Conf. | | | | | Overall |
| Team | W | | L | | T | W | | L | | T |
|---|---|---|---|---|---|---|---|---|---|---|
| Ohio Northern $ | 5 | – | 0 | – | 1 | 6 | – | 1 | – | 1 |
| John Carroll | 3 | – | 0 | – | 1 | 3 | – | 2 | – | 3 |
| Toledo | 1 | – | 0 | – | 1 | 4 | – | 4 | – | 1 |
| Denison | 4 | – | 1 | – | 1 | 6 | – | 2 | – | 1 |
| Oberlin | 2 | – | 1 | – | 0 | 5 | – | 1 | – | 1 |
| Baldwin–Wallace | 2 | – | 1 | – | 0 | 6 | – | 2 | – | 0 |
| Otterbein | 4 | – | 2 | – | 0 | 5 | – | 3 | – | 0 |
| Kent State | 2 | – | 1 | – | 0 | 5 | – | 3 | – | 0 |
| Wooster | 5 | – | 3 | – | 0 | 6 | – | 3 | – | 0 |
| Bowling Green | 1 | – | 1 | – | 1 | 6 | – | 2 | – | 1 |
| Findlay | 2 | – | 3 | – | 1 | 5 | – | 4 | – | 1 |
| Heidelberg | 2 | – | 3 | – | 0 | 4 | – | 4 | – | 0 |
| Case | 1 | – | 2 | – | 0 | 4 | – | 4 | – | 0 |
| Capital | 1 | – | 3 | – | 0 | 3 | – | 4 | – | 0 |
| Muskingum | 1 | – | 4 | – | 0 | 3 | – | 4 | – | 2 |
| Wittenberg | 1 | – | 4 | – | 1 | 1 | – | 5 | – | 1 |
| Kenyon | 0 | – | 2 | – | 0 | 5 | – | 2 | – | 0 |
| Mount Union | 0 | – | 6 | – | 0 | 1 | – | 6 | – | 0 |
$ – Conference champion

The 1942 Ohio Northern Polar Bears football team was an American football team that represented Ohio Northern University in the Ohio Athletic Conference (OAC) during the 1942 college football season. The Polar Bears compiled a 6–1–1 record (5–0–1 against OAC opponents), won the OAC championship, and outscored opponents by a total of 171 to 25.

Millard Murphy was the head coach. He had been the Ada High School coach one year earlier. Charles Heck and Collins Stackhouse led the team on offense.

Ohio Northern was ranked at No. 229 (out of 590 college and military teams) in the final rankings under the Litkenhous Difference by Score System for 1942.

== Schedule ==
| Date | Opponent | Site | Result | Source |
|---|---|---|---|---|
| September 25 | at Findlay | Donnell Stadium; Findlay, OH | W 6–0 | |
| October 3 | at Albion* | Albion, MI | L 0–6 | |
| October 10 | at Wittenberg | Springfield, OH | T 6–6 | |
| October 17 | Capital^{†} | Ada, OH | W 32–7 | |
| October 23 | vs. Bluffton* | Kenton, OH | W 62–6 | |
| October 31 | at Muskingum | New Concord, OH | W 22–0 | |
| November 7 | Mount Union | Ada, OH | W 28–0 | |
| November 14 | Heidelberg | Ada, OH | W 15–0 | |
*Non-conference game; ^{†}Homecoming
