= Camp Wilson =

American football player (1922–2001)

Profile
- Position: Fullback

Personal information
- Born: March 29, 1922; Pecos, Texas, U.S.
- Died: March 22, 2001 (aged 78); Sierra Vista, Arizona, U.S.
- Listed height: 6 ft 1 in (1.85 m)
- Listed weight: 200 lb (91 kg)

Career information
- High school: El Paso (TX)
- College: Tarleton, Hardin-Simmons, Tulsa

Career history
- Detroit Lions (1946–1949)

Awards and highlights
- 1943 Sun Bowl; 1944 Sugar Bowl; 1945 Orange Bowl; 1946 Oil Bowl; 3× Detroit Lions leading rusher (1946–1948)

Career statistics
- Rushing yards: 1,453
- Yds/Carry: 3.8
- Touchdowns: 6
- Stats at Pro Football Reference

Warren Camp Wilson (March 29, 1922 – March 22, 2001) was an American football player. He played college football at Tarleton Junior College (1941), Hardin–Simmons University (1942), and the University of Tulsa (1943–1945). He helped lead his teams to appearances in the four consecutive New Year's Day bowl games: 1943 Sun Bowl, 1944 Sugar Bowl, 1945 Orange Bowl, and 1946 Oil Bowl. He later played at the fullback position for the Detroit Lions of the National Football League (NFL) from 1946 to 1949 and was the team's leading rusher each year from 1946 to 1948.

== Early life ==
A native of Pecos, Texas, Wilson attended El Paso High School. He played fullback for the El Paso football team.

== College football ==
Wilson began his college football career at Tarleton Junior College in 1941. He played the 1942 season at Hardin–Simmons University, rushing for 981 rushing yards, and leading the team to an appearance in the 1943 Sun Bowl where he scored Hardin-Simmons' only touchdown. After the 1942 season, he served briefly in the Army but was discharged as unfit due to an ankle injury.

In October 1943, Wilson enrolled at the University of Tulsa where he played college football from 1943 to 1945. He helped lead Tulsa to a 6-0-1 record, a #15 ranking, and an invitation to play in the 1944 Sugar Bowl. In 1945, he helped lead the team to the 1945 Orange Bowl where Wilson had a 90-yard kickoff return in a 26-12 victory over Georgia Tech. And in 1946, he led Tulsa to an 8-2 record and scored the team's only touchdown in a loss to Georgia in the 1946 Oil Bowl. Wilson was believed to be the first player to play in four consecutive bowl games.

== Professional football ==
In January 1946, days after his appearance in the 1946 Oil Bowl, Wilson signed a contract to play professional football in the National Football League (NFL) for the Detroit Lions. He played four years as a fullback for the Lions from 1946 to 1949 and was the Lions' leading rusher for three consecutive years from 1946 to 1948. His best season was 1948 when he rushed for 612 yards on 157 carries.

In April 1950, the Lions traded Wilson to the New York Bulldogs in exchange for Bobby Layne. After the trade, Wilson retired from football, declining to move to New York and lose his regular job with a local steel company. Layne signed with the Lions in July 1950, and he led the Lions to three NFL championships.

== Later life ==
After retiring as a player, Wilson worked as a personnel director at a steel plant and coached football at Detroit Catholic High School. He later worked at officiating NFL games and as a supervisor at the Center Gym at Fort Bliss. He and his wife, Margaret, had three children.
