= 1942 Toledo Rockets football team =

American college football season

1942 Toledo Rockets football
- Conference: Ohio Athletic Conference
- Record: 4–4–1 (1–0–1 OAC)
- Head coach: Clarence Spears (7th season)
- Captain: Clarence Ligibel
- Home stadium: Swayne Field

1942 Ohio Athletic Conference football standings
	Conf.					Overall
Team	W		L		T	W		L		T
Ohio Northern $	5	–	0	–	1	6	–	1	–	1
John Carroll	3	–	0	–	1	3	–	2	–	3
Toledo	1	–	0	–	1	4	–	4	–	1
Denison	4	–	1	–	1	6	–	2	–	1
Oberlin	2	–	1	–	0	5	–	1	–	1
Baldwin–Wallace	2	–	1	–	0	6	–	2	–	0
Otterbein	4	–	2	–	0	5	–	3	–	0
Kent State	2	–	1	–	0	5	–	3	–	0
Wooster	5	–	3	–	0	6	–	3	–	0
Bowling Green	1	–	1	–	1	6	–	2	–	1
Findlay	2	–	3	–	1	5	–	4	–	1
Heidelberg	2	–	3	–	0	4	–	4	–	0
Case	1	–	2	–	0	4	–	4	–	0
Capital	1	–	3	–	0	3	–	4	–	0
Muskingum	1	–	4	–	0	3	–	4	–	2
Wittenberg	1	–	4	–	1	1	–	5	–	1
Kenyon	0	–	2	–	0	5	–	2	–	0
Mount Union	0	–	6	–	0	1	–	6	–	0
$ – Conference champion

The 1942 Toledo Rockets football team was an American football team that represented Toledo University in the Ohio Athletic Conference (OAC) during the 1942 college football season. In their seventh and final season under head coach Clarence Spears, the Rockets compiled a 4–4–1 record.

The team's key players included freshman Emlen Tunnell, an African-American halfback who was later inducted into the Pro Football Hall of Fame. In the opening game against Kent State, Tunnell ran for two touchdowns and passed for two more. Tunnell sustained a broken neck in the October 24 game against Marshall. Tunnell joined the Coast Guard in 1943 and did not return to Toledo after the war.

Toledo was ranked at No. 226 (out of 590 college and military teams) in the final rankings under the Litkenhous Difference by Score System for 1942.

== Schedule ==
Date	Opponent	Site	Result	Attendance	Source
September 26	Kent State	University Stadium; Toledo, OH	W 26–14		
October 3	Illinois Wesleyan*	University Stadium; Toledo, OH	W 26–0		
October 10	Western Michigan*	University Stadium; Toledo, OH	L 0–10	5,300	
October 16	at John Carroll	Cleveland, OH	T 6–6		
October 24	Marshall*	University Stadium; Toledo, OH	W 7–0	3,000	
October 31	Manhattan Beach Coast Guard*	Swayne Field; Toledo, OH	L 0–26		
November 7	at Butler*	Fairview Bowl; Indianapolis, IN	L 0–12	2,500	
November 14	at Youngstown*	Youngstown, OH	L 12–39	4,500	
November 21	Bradley Tech*	University Stadium; Toledo, OH	W 14–13		
*Non-conference game
