= Harry Wynne =

American football player (1920–1989)

Personal information
- Born: July 10, 1920; Senatobia, Mississippi, U.S.
- Died: November 28, 1989 (aged 69)
- Listed height: 6 ft 4 in (1.93 m)
- Listed weight: 203 lb (92 kg)

Career information
- High school: West Memphis (West Memphis, Arkansas)
- College: Arkansas

Career history
- Boston Yanks (1944); New York Giants (1945)

Harry Clayton Wynne (July 10, 1920 - November 28, 1989) was an American professional football player who spend two seasons in the National Football League (NFL) with the Boston Yanks in 1944 and the New York Giants in 1945. Wynne appeared in 15 career games, while making one start.

In addition to his football career, Wynne was an All-American basketball player at the University of Arkansas in 1943.
