= 1942 Cal Aggies football team =

American college football season

1942 Cal Aggies football
- Conference: Far Western Conference
- Record: 1–6 (0–2 FWC)
- Head coach: Vern Hickey (6th season)
- Captain: Lee DeWitt
- Home stadium: A Street field

1942 Far Western Conference football standings
	Conf.					Overall
Team	W		L		T	W		L		T
Pacific (CA) $	2	–	0	–	0	2	–	6	–	1
Chico State	1	–	1	–	0	5	–	1	–	0
Cal Aggies	0	–	2	–	0	1	–	6	–	0
$ – Conference champion

The 1942 Cal Aggies football team represented the College of Agriculture at Davis—now known as the University of California, Davis—as a member of the Far Western Conference (FWC) during the 1942 college football season. Led by sixth-year head coach Vern Hickey, the Aggies compiled an overall record of 1–6 with a mark of 0–2 in conference play, placing last out of three teams in the FWC. The team was outscored by its opponents 79 to 51 for the season.

The Cal Aggies were ranked at No. 320 (out of 590 college and military teams) in the final rankings under the Litkenhous Difference by Score System for 1942.

The Cal Aggies played home games at A Street field on campus in Davis, California. Like many other college football team, the Aggies did not play in the 1943 to 1945 seasons due to World War II.

== Schedule ==
Date	Opponent	Site	Result	Source
October 17	at California JV (Note: The University of California JV team was commonly known as the "Cal Ramblers".)*	California Memorial Stadium; Berkeley, CA	L 13–19	
October 24	at Chico State	Chico High School Stadium; Chico, CA	L 0–6	
November 1	Stockton Motor Repair Depot (Note: The Stockton Quartermaster Motor Depot was a motor supply depot, maintenance depot and maintenance school from 1941 to 1948. It was located near the port of Stockton, California)*	Stockton, CA	W 25–0	
November 7	Pacific (CA)	A Street field; Davis, CA	L 7–15	
November 11	at Nevada*	Mackay Stadium (Note: This stadium is the predecessor to the current Mackay Stadium, which was opened for the 1966 season.); Reno, NV	L 0–14	
November 27	Whittier*	A Street field; Davis, CA	L 6–18	
December 5	at Saint Mary's JV*	Moraga, CA	L 0–17	
*Non-conference game
