= 1942 Pacific Tigers football team =

American college football season

1942 Pacific Tigers football

FWC champion
- Conference: Far Western Conference
- Record: 2–6–1 (2–0 FWC)
- Head coach: Amos Alonzo Stagg (10th season)
- Home stadium: Baxter Stadium

1942 Far Western Conference football standings
	Conf.					Overall
Team	W		L		T	W		L		T
Pacific (CA) $	2	–	0	–	0	2	–	6	–	1
Chico State	1	–	1	–	0	5	–	1	–	0
Cal Aggies	0	–	2	–	0	1	–	6	–	0
$ – Conference champion

The 1942 Pacific Tigers football team represented the College of the Pacific—now known as the University of the Pacific—in Stockton, California as a member of the Far Western Conference (FWC) during the 1942 college football season. Led by tenth-year head coach Amos Alonzo Stagg, Pacific compiled an overall record of 2–6–1 with a mark of 2–0 in conference play, winning the FWC title. The team was outscored by its opponents 141 to 58 for the season and was shut out in five games.

Pacific was ranked at No. 174 (out of 590 college and military teams) in the final rankings under the Litkenhous Difference by Score System for 1942.

The Tigers played home games at Baxter Stadium in Stockton.

== Schedule ==
Date	Opponent	Site	Result	Attendance	Source
September 19	Saint Mary's Pre-Flight*	Baxter Stadium; Stockton, CA	L 9–38		
September 26	at Washington*	Husky Stadium; Seattle, WA	L 0–27	12,000	
October 3	Chico State	Baxter Stadium; Stockton, CA	W 27–0		
October 10	California JV*	Baxter Stadium; Stockton, CA	T 0–0		
October 17	at San Jose State*	Spartan Stadium; San Jose, CA (rivalry)	L 0–29		
October 31	Fresno State*^{†}	Baxter Stadium; Stockton, CA	L 0–13	3,500	
November 7	at Cal Aggies	A Street field; Davis, CA	W 15–7		
November 11	Alameda Coast Guard*	Baxter Stadium; Stockton, CA	L 7–13		
November 14	San Diego NTS (Note: Naval Training Center San Diego (Naval Training Station) was a U.S. Navy facility from 1923 to 1997.)*	Baxter Stadium; Stockton, CA	L 0–14		
*Non-conference game; ^{†}Homecoming
