= List of Loyola Marymount Lions men's basketball head coaches =

The following is a list of Loyola Marymount Lions men's basketball head coaches. There have been 27 head coaches of the Lions in their 100-season history.

Loyola Marymount's current head coach is Stan Johnson. He was hired as the Lions' head coach in March 2020, replacing Mike Dunlap, who was fired after the 2019–20 season.

No.	Tenure	Coach	Years	Record	Pct.
–	1906–1907 (Note: Records for these seasons are incomplete.); 1942–1943	No coach	2	8–13	.381
–	1908–1910; 1911–1912; 1913–1914	Unknown	4	1–5	.167
1	1923–1924	Thomas Flaherty	1	6–6	.500
2	1924–1925	Harold Hess	1	10–7	.588
3	1925–1926	George Casey	1	6–5	.545
4	1926–1929	John Richlie	3	20–21	.488
5	1929–1931	Joseph Donahue	2	7–9	.438
6	1934–1936	William Sargent	2	8–15	.348
7	1936–1940	Jimmy Needles	4	48–39	.552
8	1940–1942	Bernie Bradley	2	27–16	.628
9	1943–1944	Thomas Korn	1	4–1	.800
10	1946–1952	Scotty McDonald	6	83–90	.480
11	1952–1953	Edwin Powell	1	14–14	.500
12	1953–1961	Bill Donovan	8	107–101	.514
13	1961–1968	John Arndt	7	91–90	.503
14	1968–1973	Richard Baker	5	55–73	.430
15	1973–1979	Dave Benaderet	6	61–96	.389
16	1979–1980	Ron Jacobs	1	14–14	.500
17	1980–1985	Ed Goorjian	5	44–92	.324
18	1985–1990	Paul Westhead	5	105–48	.686
19	1990–1992	Jay Hillock	2	31–28	.525
20	1992–1997	John Olive	5	51–88	.367
21	1997–2000	Charles Bradley	3	20–62	.244
22	2000–2005	Steve Aggers	5	55–90	.379
23	2005–2008	Rodney Tention	3	30–62	.326
24	2008 (Note: Bill Bayno took a leave of absence after three games, then resigned in January 2009. Max Good served as interim head coach while Bayno was on leave, and was named permanent head coach after Bayno's resignation.)	Bill Bayno	1	0–3	.000
25	2008–2014	Max Good	6	77–117	.397
26	2014–2020	Mike Dunlap	6	81–108	.429
27	2020–present	Stan Johnson	3	43–39	.524
Totals		27 coaches	100 seasons	1,107–1,352	.450
Records updated through end of 2022–23 season Source
