= List of San Diego State Aztecs head football coaches =

The San Diego State Aztecs football team represents San Diego State University in the Pac-12 Conference. The Aztecs competed in the National Collegiate Athletic Association (NCAA) College Division in the years 1921–1968. In 1969, the team moved to National Collegiate Athletic Association (NCAA) Division I.

The program has had 19 head coaches in its 97 seasons of existence. Don Coryell is the coach with the highest winning percentage (.840) and most wins (104) of any San Diego State coaches. He was inducted into the College Football Hall of Fame in 1999. From a perspective of Bowl appearances, the former coach Rocky Long has been the most successful and has led the Aztecs to a Bowl game in each of his nine years as head coach.

== Key ==
Key to symbols in coaches list
| General | | Overall | | Conference | | Postseason (Note: Although the first Rose Bowl Game was played in 1902, it has been continuously played since the 1916 game, and is recognized as the oldest bowl game by the NCAA. "—" indicates any season prior to 1916 when postseason games were not played.) | |
|---|---|---|---|---|---|---|---|
| No. | Order of coaches (Note: A running total of the number of head coaches, with coaches who served separate tenures being counted only once. Interim head coaches are represented with "Int" and are not counted in the running total. "—" indicates the team played but either without a coach or no coach is on record. "X" indicates an interim year without play.) | GC | Games coached | CW | Conference wins | PW | Postseason wins |
| DC | Division championships | OW | Overall wins | CL | Conference losses | PL | Postseason losses |
| CC | Conference championships | OL | Overall losses | CT | Conference ties | PT | Postseason ties |
| NC | National championships | OT | Overall ties (Note: Overtime rules in college football were introduced in 1996, making ties impossible in the period since.) | C% | Conference winning percentage | | |
| † | Elected to the College Football Hall of Fame | O% | Overall winning percentage (Note: When computing the win–loss percentage, a tie counts as half a win and half a loss.) | | | | |

== Coaches ==
List of head football coaches showing season(s) coached, overall records, conference records, postseason records, championships and selected awards (Note: Statistics correct as of the end of the 2025 NCAA Division I FBS football season.)
| No. | Name | Year(s) (Note: San Diego State did not field teams during the 1943–1944 seasons.) | Season(s) | GC | OW | OL | OT | O% | CW | CL | CT | C% | PW | PL | PT | DC | CC | NC | Awards |
|---|---|---|---|---|---|---|---|---|---|---|---|---|---|---|---|---|---|---|---|
| 1 | Charles E. Peterson | 1921–1929 | 9 | 78 | 43 | 31 | 4 | 0.577 | 16 | 17 | 1 | 0.485 | — | — | — | — | 3 | 0 | — |
| 2 | Walter Herreid | 1930–1934 | 5 | 46 | 20 | 21 | 5 | 0.489 | 13 | 12 | 4 | 0.517 | — | — | — | — | 0 | 0 | — |
| 3 | Leo Calland | 1935–1941 | 7 | 60 | 34 | 22 | 4 | 0.600 | 14 | 10 | 3 | 0.574 | — | — | — | — | 2 | 0 | — |
| 4 | John Eubank | 1942 | 1 | 7 | 0 | 6 | 1 | 0.071 | 0 | 0 | 0 | – | — | — | — | — | 0 | 0 | — |
| 5 | Bob Breitbard | 1945 | 1 | 7 | 2 | 5 | 0 | 0.286 | 0 | 0 | 0 | – | — | — | — | — | 0 | 0 | — |
| 6 | Gander Terry | 1946 | 1 | 10 | 6 | 4 | 0 | 0.600 | 2 | 2 | 0 | 0.500 | — | — | — | — | 0 | 0 | — |
| 7 | Bill Schutte | 1947–1955 | 9 | 88 | 48 | 36 | 4 | 0.568 | 20 | 14 | 3 | 0.581 | 1 | 1 | 0 | — | 2 | 0 | — |
| 8 | Paul Governali | 1956–1960 | 5 | 42 | 11 | 27 | 4 | 0.310 | 4 | 15 | 0 | 0.211 | 0 | 0 | 0 | — | 0 | 0 | — |
| 9 | Don Coryell^{†} | 1961–1972 | 12 | 125 | 104 | 19 | 2 | 0.840 | 44 | 10 | 1 | 0.809 | 3 | 0 | 0 | — | 7 | 3 – 1966; 1967; 1968 | — |
| 10 | Claude Gilbert | 1973–1980 | 8 | 89 | 61 | 26 | 2 | 0.697 | 20 | 12 | 1 | 0.621 | 0 | 0 | 0 | — | 2 | 0 | — |
| 11 | Doug Scovil | 1981–1985 | 5 | 59 | 24 | 32 | 3 | 0.432 | 15 | 21 | 3 | 0.423 | 0 | 0 | 0 | — | 0 | 0 | — |
| 12 | Denny Stolz | 1986–1988 | 3 | 35 | 16 | 19 | 0 | 0.457 | 14 | 10 | 0 | 0.583 | 0 | 1 | 0 | — | 1 | 0 | — |
| 13 | Al Luginbill | 1989–1993 | 3 | 59 | 31 | 25 | 3 | 0.551 | 25 | 11 | 2 | 0.684 | 0 | 1 | 0 | — | 0 | 0 | — |
| 14 | Ted Tollner | 1994–2001 | 8 | 91 | 43 | 48 | 0 | 0.473 | 32 | 29 | 0 | 0.525 | 0 | 1 | 0 | 1 | 0 | 0 | — |
| 15 | Tom Craft | 2002–2005 | 4 | 48 | 19 | 29 | — | 0.396 | 13 | 16 | — | 0.448 | 0 | 0 | — | — | 0 | 0 | — |
| 16 | Chuck Long | 2006–2008 | 3 | 36 | 9 | 27 | — | 0.250 | 7 | 17 | — | 0.292 | 0 | 0 | — | — | 0 | 0 | — |
| 17 | Brady Hoke | 2009–2010; 2020–2023 | 2, 4 | 72 | 40 | 32 | — | 0.556 | 25 | 21 | — | 0.543 | 2 | 1 | — | 1 | 0 | 0 | — |
| 18 | Rocky Long | 2011–2019 | 9 | 119 | 81 | 38 | — | 0.681 | 51 | 20 | — | 0.718 | 4 | 5 | — | 4 | 3 | 0 | — |
| 19 | Sean Lewis | 2024–present | 2 | 25 | 12 | 13 | — | 0.480 | 8 | 7 | — | 0.533 | 0 | 1 | — | 0 | 0 | 0 | — |
