= 1942 Idaho Vandals football team =

American college football season

1942 Idaho Vandals football
- Conference: Pacific Coast Conference
- Record: 3–7 (1–5 PCC)
- Head coach: Francis Schmidt (2nd season)
- Home stadium: Neale Stadium

1942 Pacific Coast Conference football standings
	Conf.					Overall
Team	W		L		T	W		L		T
No. 13 UCLA $	6	–	1	–	0	7	–	4	–	0
Washington State	5	–	1	–	1	6	–	2	–	2
No. 12 Stanford	5	–	2	–	0	6	–	4	–	0
USC	4	–	2	–	1	5	–	5	–	1
Oregon State	4	–	4	–	0	4	–	5	–	1
Washington	3	–	3	–	2	4	–	3	–	3
California	3	–	4	–	0	5	–	5	–	0
Oregon	2	–	5	–	0	2	–	6	–	0
Idaho	1	–	5	–	0	3	–	7	–	0
Montana	0	–	6	–	0	0	–	8	–	0
$ – Conference champion; Rankings from AP Poll

The 1942 Idaho Vandals football team represented the University of Idaho in the 1942 college football season. The Vandals were led by second-year head coach Francis Schmidt and were members of the Pacific Coast Conference.

Idaho was ranked at No. 147 (out of 590 college and military teams) in the final rankings under the Litkenhous Difference by Score System for 1942.

Home games were played on campus in Moscow at Neale Stadium, with one game in Boise at Public School Field, the last in southern Idaho for five years.

Schmidt, age 56, was a longtime college football head coach, most recently in the Big Ten Conference at Ohio State University (1934–1940), where he was succeeded by a 32-year-old high school coach named Paul Brown.

Shortly before the start of the 1943 season, the Idaho football program (with Washington State and Oregon State) went on hiatus due to World War II; two seasons were missed and Vandal football returned in 1945.

The Vandals were 3–7 overall in 1942 and 1–5 in conference play.

Prior to their second-ever night game, played at Gonzaga Stadium in Spokane against the Second Air Force on October 3, the Vandals practiced under the lights in Moscow with white and yellow footballs. They had won their first the previous year over Gonzaga, but lost to the military team, 14–0.

In the Battle of the Palouse with neighbor Washington State, the Vandals suffered a fifteenth straight loss, falling 7–0 on a soggy field at Neale Stadium in Moscow on November 14. Idaho's most recent win in the series was a 17 years earlier in 1925 and the next was a dozen years away, in 1954.

Two weeks earlier on Halloween, Idaho broke a rare three-game losing streak to Montana in the rivalry game for the Little Brown Stein with a 21-point shutout at Missoula. The Vandals turned the tables on the Griz, who had shut out Idaho the previous year in Moscow. When Montana was a member of the PCC (through 1949), the loser of the game was frequently last in the conference standings.

The final game was in Los Angeles on December 5, a 40–13 loss to the UCLA Bruins, the conference champions who were Rose Bowl-bound.

== Schedule ==
Date	Opponent	Site	Result	Attendance	Source
September 26	Oregon State^{†}	Neale Stadium; Moscow, ID	L 0–32	7,000	
October 3	vs. Second Air Force*	Gonzaga Stadium; Spokane, WA	L 0–14	7,000	
October 9	at Eastern Washington*	Cheney, WA	W 28–7	2,500	
October 17	at Stanford	Stanford Stadium; Stanford, CA	L 7–54	5,000	
October 24	at Oregon	Hayward Field; Eugene, OR	L 0–28	4,000	
October 31	at Montana	Dornblaser Field; Missoula, MT (Little Brown Stein)	W 21–0	2,000	
November 14	Washington State	Neale Stadium; Moscow, ID (Battle of the Palouse)	L 0–7	5,000	
November 21	Portland*	Public School Field; Boise, ID	W 20–14	6,000	
November 26	at Utah*	Ute Stadium; Salt Lake City, UT	L 7–13	12,500	
December 5	at UCLA	Los Angeles Memorial Coliseum; Los Angeles, CA	L 13–40	25,000	
*Non-conference game; ^{†}Homecoming

== Coaching staff ==
- James A. Brown, line
- Guy Wicks, freshmen

== All-conference ==
No Vandals were named to the All-Coast team.

== NFL draft ==
Three Vandal seniors were selected in the 1943 NFL draft, which lasted 32 rounds (300 selections).

Player	Position	Round	Overall	Franchise
Veto Berllus	End	20th	186	New York Giants
Irv Konopka	Tackle	26th	241	Detroit Lions
Pete Hecomovich	Back	30th	284	Chicago Cardinals

== After the season ==
Like many colleges, the football program at Idaho was stopped during the war due to manpower shortages, made official in late September 1943. Schmidt continued to reside in Moscow, but his health began to fail in the spring of 1944. He spent his last three weeks at St. Luke's Hospital in Spokane, Washington, where he died on September 19 at age 58.

UI alumnus and assistant coach James "Babe" Brown, the acting athletic director and head basketball coach, became the interim head football coach for 1945 and the head coach in 1946.
