= Milt Smith (American football) =

American football player (1919–2010)

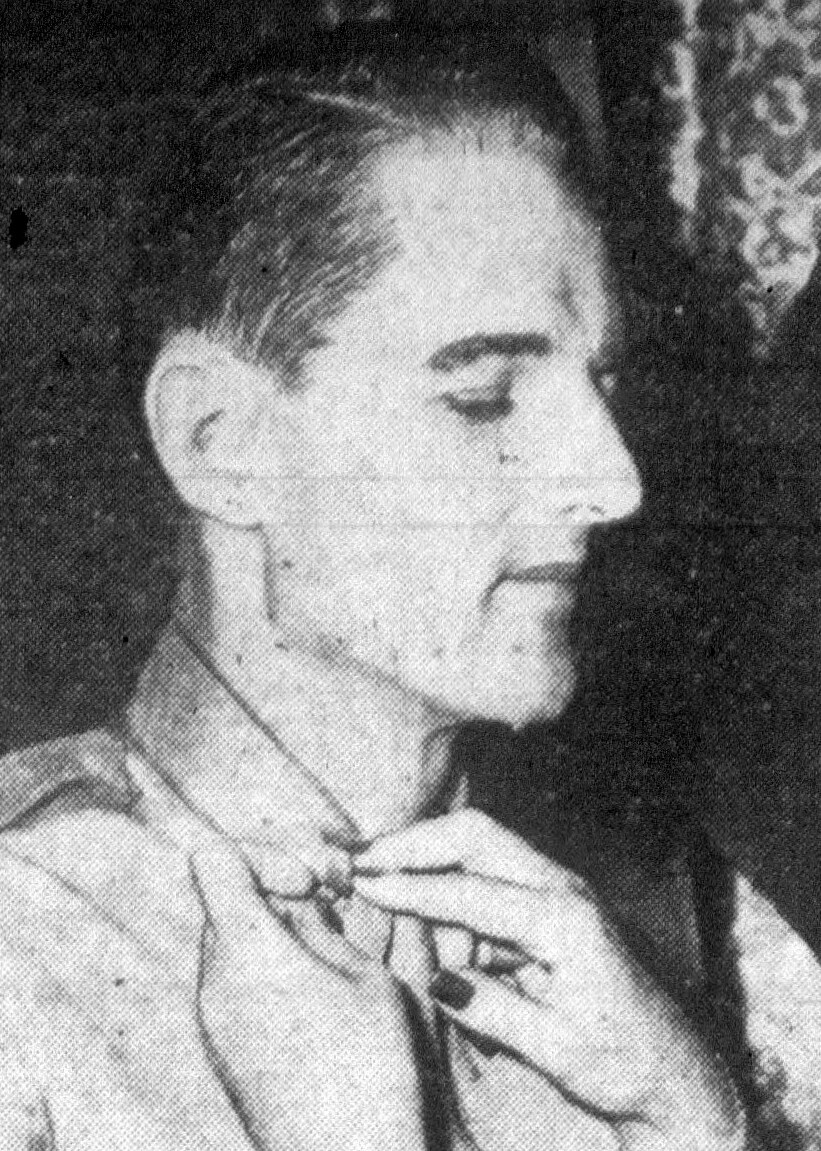
- Smith in 1943

No. 48, 30, 82, 55
- Position: Left end

Personal information
- Born: July 17, 1919; Redlands, California, U.S.
- Died: August 5, 2010 (aged 91); Los Angeles, California, U.S.
- Listed height: 6 ft 3 in (1.91 m)
- Listed weight: 180 lb (82 kg)

Career information
- High school: Santa Ana (CA)
- College: UCLA (1939-1942)
- NFL draft: 1944: 23rd round, 234th overall pick

Career history
- Philadelphia Eagles (1945); Los Angeles Bulldogs (1946)

Awards and highlights
- First-team All-PCC (1940); 1942 AP All-Pacific Coast 3rd Team; 1943 Rose Bowl start
- Stats at Pro Football Reference

Milton Bradley Smith (July 17, 1919 – August 5, 2010) was an American professional football player and business operator. Smith is best remembered as a college football left end who appeared with the UCLA Bruins in a 1943 Rose Bowl loss to the University of Georgia. Smith was later selected by the Philadelphia Eagles of the National Football League (NFL) and saw action in five professional games.

During World War II Smith served as a lieutenant in the United States Army, fighting on the European front, where he was severely wounded at the Battle of the Bulge. Smith was later the proprietor of Smith's Sporting Goods, located in Westwood, Los Angeles, California.

== Biography ==
=== Early life ===
Milton Bradley Smith, known to his family and friends by the nickname "Milt," was born July 17, 1919, in Redlands, California.

Smith attended Santa Ana High School in Santa Ana, California, which remains today the oldest and largest high school in Southern California's Orange County.

=== College career ===
Following his graduation from high school, Smith enrolled in the fall of 1939 at the University of California, Los Angeles. The 1939 UCLA team was one of sports legend, featuring three African-American stars: future baseball great Jackie Robinson, fellow halfback and National Football League color-barrier buster Kenny Washington, and fleet-footed Left End and Los Angeles Rams teammate of Washington, Woody Strode. When the Strode departed from UCLA after the 1939 season, the Sophomore Smith and was named by UCLA head coach Babe Horrell to start for the Bruins in 1940 at Strode's Left End position.

Officially listed at the playing weight of 180 pounds during his first year as a UCLA starter, Smith wore jersey number 48 for the Bruins. As was the case for all American football players in the era before free substitution, Smith played on both the offensive and defensive sides of the ball. Smith's 1940 season was cut short by injury, however, when he suffered a broken leg in the third quarter of a November 23 drubbing at the hands of the Washington Huskies.

Despite the abrupt and painful end to his 1940 season, Smith's play still merited his inclusion by sportswriters as a second-team member of the 1940 Associated Press All-Pacific Coast Football Team.

Smith was able to rehabilitate his injury and was ready for return to the UCLA starting lineup at the left end position in time for the start of the 1941 season, where he would once again become a favorite target of future Pro Football Hall of Fame quarterback Bob Waterfield. Smith was, going into the season, included in the discussion of All-American candidates at the end position. Smith's season ultimately failed to live up to high preseason hopes, however, and he was relegated to honorable mention status on the 1941 All-Pacific Coast Football Teams by sports editors associated with United Press International publications.

In the 1942 season, Smith was tapped by the Associated Press for All-Pacific Coast 3rd Team honors. Smith would start for UCLA in the 1943 Rose Bowl at Pasadena, California, won by the University of Georgia Bulldogs, 9–0.

=== Military service ===
Following graduation at UCLA in 1943, Smith was enlisted in the United States Army and shipped out to armored command officer candidates' school at Fort Knox, Kentucky. Despite the presence of at least four other officer candidates with college bowl football experience at Fort Knox, the facility had no military service football team and Smith was outside of the game for the year. Nevertheless, Smith was drafted by the Philadelphia Eagles in the 1944 National Football League draft in the 23rd round, making Smith the 234th selection overall for the year. He signed with the Eagles and saw action in five games before shipping out to Europe.

During World War II Smith was commissioned as a lieutenant.

Smith was very badly wounded at the Battle of the Bulge and nearly left for dead by medics. Someone spotted his engraved 1943 Rose Bowl watch, however, and shouted, "This is one guy we've got to save!" causing extraordinary measures to be taken to help Smith survive. Fully 18 months of convalescence followed, as Smith slowly recovered from his severe wartime wounds.

=== After football ===
In addition to being a football player, Smith was a very proficient equestrian, chess player, and yachtsman. He was the proprietor of Smith's Sporting Goods, located in Westwood. The store was located at 10863 West Pico Boulevard in Los Angeles.

Smith was a resident of Marina del Rey, California, during his final years.

=== Death and legacy ===
Smith died August 5, 2010, in Los Angeles, California. He was 91 years old at the time of his death.

Smith was preceded in death by his wife, Virginia Smith, and survived by one of his two daughters, as well as various other relatives.
