= 1942 San Diego State Aztecs football team =

American college football season

1942 San Diego State Aztecs football
- Conference: Independent
- Record: 0–6–1
- Head coach: John Eubank (1st season)
- Home stadium: Aztec Bowl

1942 Western college football independents records
	Conf.			Overall
Team	W	L	T	W		L		T
Fresno State		–		9	–	1	–	0
San Jose State		–		7	–	2	–	0
No. 17 Santa Clara		–		7	–	2	–	0
Portland		–		5	–	2	–	0
Idaho Southern Branch		–		4	–	2	–	0
Saint Mary's		–		6	–	3	–	1
San Francisco		–		6	–	4	–	0
Loyola (CA)		–		5	–	4	–	1
Nevada		–		4	–	3	–	1
Cal Poly		–		4	–	3	–	0
San Diego State		–		0	–	6	–	1
San Francisco State		–		0	–	6	–	0
Rankings from AP Poll

The 1942 San Diego State Aztecs football team represented San Diego State College—now known as San Diego State University—as an independent during the 1942 college football season. San Diego State had been a member of the California Collegiate Athletic Association (CCAA) in 1941, but the conference suspended operating during World War II. Led by John Eubank in his first and only season as head coach, the Aztecs compiled a record of 0–6–1 and were outscored by opponents 211 to 50 on the season. The team played home games at Aztec Bowl in San Diego.

San Diego State was ranked at No. 389 (out of 590 college and military teams) in the final rankings under the Litkenhous Difference by Score System for 1942.

== Schedule ==
Date	Opponent	Site	Result	Attendance	Source
October 3	Pomona	Aztec Bowl; San Diego CA	T 6–6	2,500	
October 11	Fresno State	Aztec Bowl; San Diego, CA (rivalry)	L 0–66	6,500	
October 17	Redlands	Aztec Bowl; San Diego, CA	L 12–14		
October 25	March Field	Aztec Bowl; San Diego, CA	L 6–39		
October 31	at Cal Poly	Mustang Stadium; San Luis Obispo, CA	L 13–32	1,500	
November 8	at San Jose State	Spartan Stadium; San Jose, CA	L 0–26	3,000	
November 14	Whittier^{†}	Aztec Bowl; San Diego, CA	L 13–28		
^{†}Homecoming
