= 1942 Idaho Southern Branch Bengals football team =

American college football season

1942 Idaho Southern Branch Bengals football
- Conference: Independent
- Record: 4–2
- Head coach: John Vesser (2nd season)
- Captain: Rex Wells (Note: Wells later played for the 1943 Michigan team and served in the United States Marine Corps during World War II and the Korean War; he died in 2002 at age 79.)
- Home stadium: Spud Bowl

1942 Western college football independents records
	Conf.			Overall
Team	W	L	T	W		L		T
Fresno State		–		9	–	1	–	0
San Jose State		–		7	–	2	–	0
No. 17 Santa Clara		–		7	–	2	–	0
Portland		–		5	–	2	–	0
Idaho Southern Branch		–		4	–	2	–	0
Saint Mary's		–		6	–	3	–	1
San Francisco		–		6	–	4	–	0
Loyola (CA)		–		5	–	4	–	1
Nevada		–		4	–	3	–	1
Cal Poly		–		4	–	3	–	0
San Diego State		–		0	–	6	–	1
San Francisco State		–		0	–	6	–	0
Rankings from AP Poll

The 1942 Idaho Southern Branch Bengals football team was an American football team that represented the University of Idaho, Southern Branch (later renamed Idaho State University) as an independent during the 1942 college football season. In their second season under head coach John Vesser, the team compiled a 4–2 record and outscored their opponents by a total of 77 to 60.

The Bengals did not field a team during the 1943 college football season, next competing in 1944.

== Schedule ==
Contested during World War II, the team's second and sixth games were played against military service teams.

Date	Opponent	Site	Result	Attendance	Source
October 2	at Weber	Ogden, UT	W 13–0	1,500	
October 10	Logan Marines	Spud Bowl; Pocatello, ID	W 27–0		
October 16	at College of Idaho	Caldwell, ID	W 6–0		
November 7	Compton^{†}	Spud Bowl; Pocatello, ID	W 7–0		
November 11	at Colorado College	Colorado Springs, CO	L 7–21 (Note: Some sources list the loss to Colorado College with a 7–20 score.)		
November 14	at Fort Douglas	Ute Stadium; Salt Lake City, UT	L 17–39	1,000	
^{†}Homecoming
