= 1942 Washington Huskies football team =

American college football season

1942 Washington Huskies football
- Conference: Pacific Coast Conference
- Record: 4–3–3 (3–3–2 PCC)
- Head coach: Ralph Welch (1st season)
- Captain: Walt Harrison
- Home stadium: University of Washington Stadium

1942 Pacific Coast Conference football standings
	Conf.					Overall
Team	W		L		T	W		L		T
No. 13 UCLA $	6	–	1	–	0	7	–	4	–	0
Washington State	5	–	1	–	1	6	–	2	–	2
No. 12 Stanford	5	–	2	–	0	6	–	4	–	0
USC	4	–	2	–	1	5	–	5	–	1
Oregon State	4	–	4	–	0	4	–	5	–	1
Washington	3	–	3	–	2	4	–	3	–	3
California	3	–	4	–	0	5	–	5	–	0
Oregon	2	–	5	–	0	2	–	6	–	0
Idaho	1	–	5	–	0	3	–	7	–	0
Montana	0	–	6	–	0	0	–	8	–	0
$ – Conference champion; Rankings from AP Poll

The 1942 Washington Huskies football team was an American football team that represented the University of Washington during the 1942 college football season. In its first season under head coach Ralph Welch, the team compiled a 4–3–3 record, finished in sixth place in the Pacific Coast Conference, and outscored its opponents by a combined total of 120 to 94. Walt Harrison was the team captain.

Washington was ranked at No. 57 (out of 590 college and military teams) in the final rankings under the Litkenhous Difference by Score System for 1942.

== Schedule ==
Date	Opponent	Site	Result	Attendance	Source
September 26	Pacific (CA)*	University of Washington Stadium; Seattle, WA	W 27–0	12,000	
October 3	USC	University of Washington Stadium; Seattle, WA	T 0–0	26,000	
October 10	at Oregon	Multnomah Stadium; Portland, OR (rivalry)	W 15–7	13,000	
October 17	Montana	University of Washington Stadium; Seattle, WA	W 35–0	8,000	
October 24	California^{†}	University of Washington Stadium; Seattle, WA	L 6–19	31,000	
October 31	Oregon State	University of Washington Stadium; Seattle, WA	W 13–0	7,000	
November 7	vs. Stanford	Kezar Stadium; San Francisco, CA	L 7–20	20,000	
November 14	St. Mary's Pre-Flight*	University of Washington Stadium; Seattle, WA	T 0–0	7,000	
November 21	at No. 18 UCLA	Los Angeles Memorial Coliseum; Los Angeles, CA	L 10–14	35,000	
November 28	No. 15 Washington State	University of Washington Stadium; Seattle, WA (rivalry)	T 0–0	29,000	
*Non-conference game; ^{†}Homecoming; Rankings from AP Poll released prior to the game; Source:

== NFL draft selections ==
Five Washington Huskies were selected in the 1943 NFL draft, which lasted 32 rounds with 300 selections.

= Husky Hall of Fame

Player	Position	Round	Pick	NFL club
Walt Harrison	Center	7	2	Philadelphia Eagles (Steagles)
Bob Friedman	Tackle	18	2	Philadelphia Eagles (Steagles)
Carl Falk	Tackle	20	5	Cleveland Rams
Mark McCorklel	Back	22	5	Cleveland Rams
Pete Susick	Back	27	8	Green Bay Packers
