= 1942 USC Trojans football team =

American college football season

1942 USC Trojans football
- Conference: Pacific Coast Conference
- Record: 5–5–1 (4–2–1 PCC)
- Head coach: Jeff Cravath (1st season)
- Home stadium: Los Angeles Memorial Coliseum

1942 Pacific Coast Conference football standings
	Conf.					Overall
Team	W		L		T	W		L		T
No. 13 UCLA $	6	–	1	–	0	7	–	4	–	0
Washington State	5	–	1	–	1	6	–	2	–	2
No. 12 Stanford	5	–	2	–	0	6	–	4	–	0
USC	4	–	2	–	1	5	–	5	–	1
Oregon State	4	–	4	–	0	4	–	5	–	1
Washington	3	–	3	–	2	4	–	3	–	3
California	3	–	4	–	0	5	–	5	–	0
Oregon	2	–	5	–	0	2	–	6	–	0
Idaho	1	–	5	–	0	3	–	7	–	0
Montana	0	–	6	–	0	0	–	8	–	0
$ – Conference champion; Rankings from AP Poll

The 1942 USC Trojans football team represented the University of Southern California (USC) in the 1942 college football season. In their first year under head coach Jeff Cravath, the Trojans compiled a 5–5–1 record (4–2–1 against conference opponents), finished in fourth place in the Pacific Coast Conference, and were outscored by their opponents by a combined total of 184 to 128.

USC was ranked at No. 34 (out of 590 college and military teams) in the final rankings under the Litkenhous Difference by Score System for 1942.

== Schedule ==
Date	Opponent	Rank	Site	Result	Attendance	Source
September 26	Tulane*		Los Angeles Memorial Coliseum; Los Angeles, CA	L 13–27	45,000	
October 3	at Washington		Husky Stadium; Seattle, WA	T 0–0	26,000	
October 10	at No. 1 Ohio State*		Ohio Stadium; Columbus, OH	L 12–28	56,436	
October 17	No. 10 Washington State		Los Angeles Memorial Coliseum; Los Angeles, CA	W 26–12	40,000	
October 24	vs. Stanford		Kezar Stadium; San Francisco, CA (rivalry)	L 6–14	20,000	
November 7	California		Los Angeles Memorial Coliseum; Los Angeles, CA	W 21–7	50,000	
November 14	Oregon		Los Angeles Memorial Coliseum; Los Angeles, CA	W 40–0	40,000	
November 28	No. 8 Notre Dame*^{†}	No. 14	Los Angeles Memorial Coliseum; Los Angeles, CA (rivalry)	L 0–13	95,000	
December 5	Montana		Los Angeles Memorial Coliseum; Los Angeles, CA	W 38–0	25,000	
December 12	No. 13 UCLA		Los Angeles Memorial Coliseum; Los Angeles, CA (Victory Bell)	L 7–14	87,500	
December 19	Saint Mary's Pre-Flight*		Los Angeles Memorial Coliseum; Los Angeles, CA	W 21–13	9,000	
*Non-conference game; ^{†}Homecoming; Rankings from AP Poll released prior to the game; Source:

== Rankings ==
Ranking movements Legend: ██ Increase in ranking ██ Decrease in ranking — = Not ranked
	Week							
Poll	1	2	3	4	5	6	7	Final
AP	—	—	—	—	—	16	14	—
