= 1942 Washington State Cougars football team =

American college football season

1942 Washington State Cougars football
- Conference: Pacific Coast Conference

Ranking
- AP: No. 17
- Record: 6–2–2 (5–1–1 PCC)
- Head coach: Babe Hollingbery (17th season)
- Home stadium: Rogers Field, Gonzaga Stadium

1942 Pacific Coast Conference football standings
	Conf.					Overall
Team	W		L		T	W		L		T
No. 13 UCLA $	6	–	1	–	0	7	–	4	–	0
Washington State	5	–	1	–	1	6	–	2	–	2
No. 12 Stanford	5	–	2	–	0	6	–	4	–	0
USC	4	–	2	–	1	5	–	5	–	1
Oregon State	4	–	4	–	0	4	–	5	–	1
Washington	3	–	3	–	2	4	–	3	–	3
California	3	–	4	–	0	5	–	5	–	0
Oregon	2	–	5	–	0	2	–	6	–	0
Idaho	1	–	5	–	0	3	–	7	–	0
Montana	0	–	6	–	0	0	–	8	–	0
$ – Conference champion; Rankings from AP Poll

The 1942 Washington State Cougars football team was an American football team that represented Washington State College during the 1942 college football season. Seventeenth-year head coach Babe Hollingbery led the team to a 5–1–1 mark in the PCC and 6–2–2 overall.

Washington State was ranked at No. 50 (out of 590 college and military teams) in the final rankings under the Litkenhous Difference by Score System for 1942.

Two home games were played on campus at Rogers Field in Pullman and two in Spokane at Gonzaga Stadium.

The season was Hollingbery's last and marked the longest tenure at the school. Shortly before the start of the 1943 season, the WSC football program (with Idaho and Oregon State), went on hiatus due to World War II, joining Oregon and Montana. Two seasons were missed, and Cougar football returned in 1945.

== Schedule ==
Date	Opponent	Rank	Site	Result	Attendance	Source
September 26	at Stanford		Stanford Stadium; Stanford, CA	W 6–0	15,000	
October 3	Oregon		Rogers Field; Pullman, WA	W 7–0	8,000	
October 10	Montana		Rogers Field; Pullman, WA	W 68–16	10,000	
October 17	at USC	No. 10	Los Angeles Memorial Coliseum; Los Angeles, CA	L 12–26	40,000	
October 24	at Oregon State		Multnomah Stadium; Portland, OR	W 26–13	20,000	
November 7	Michigan State*		Gonzaga Stadium; Spokane, WA	W 25–13	13,000	
November 14	at Idaho	No. 14	Neale Stadium; Moscow, ID (rivalry)	W 7–0	5,000	
November 21	Second Air Force*	No. 12	Gonzaga Stadium; Spokane, WA	T 6–6	10,000	
November 28	at Washington	No. 15	Husky Stadium; Seattle, WA (rivalry)	T 0–0	29,000	
December 5	vs. Texas A&M*	No. 17	Alamo Stadium; San Antonio, TX	L 0–21	18,000	
*Non-conference game; Rankings from AP Poll released prior to the game; Source:

== Rankings ==
Ranking movements Legend: ██ Increase in ranking ██ Decrease in ranking — = Not ranked ( ) = First-place votes
	Week							
Poll	1	2	3	4	5	6	7	Final
AP	10 (3)	—	—	—	14	12 (1)	15 (1)	17
