= 1942 San Jose State Spartans football team =

American college football season

1942 San Jose State Spartans football
- Conference: Independent
- Record: 7–2
- Head coach: Glenn Hartranft (1st season)
- Home stadium: Spartan Stadium

1942 Western college football independents records
	Conf.			Overall
Team	W	L	T	W		L		T
Fresno State		–		9	–	1	–	0
San Jose State		–		7	–	2	–	0
No. 17 Santa Clara		–		7	–	2	–	0
Portland		–		5	–	2	–	0
Idaho Southern Branch		–		4	–	2	–	0
Saint Mary's		–		6	–	3	–	1
San Francisco		–		6	–	4	–	0
Loyola (CA)		–		5	–	4	–	1
Nevada		–		4	–	3	–	1
Cal Poly		–		4	–	3	–	0
San Diego State		–		0	–	6	–	1
San Francisco State		–		0	–	6	–	0
Rankings from AP Poll

The 1942 San Jose State Spartans football team represented San Jose State College—now known as San Diego State University—as an independent during the 1942 college football season. San Jose State had been a member of the California Collegiate Athletic Association (CCAA) in 1941, but the conference suspended operating during World War II. Led by Glenn Hartranft in his first and only season as head coach, the Spartans compiled a record of 7–2. The team played home games at Spartan Stadium in San Jose, California. San Jose State did not field a team again until 1946.

San Jose State was ranked at No. 105 (out of 590 college and military teams) in the final rankings under the Litkenhous Difference by Score System for 1942.

== Schedule ==
Date	Time	Opponent	Site	Result	Attendance	Source
September 26		Pomona	Spartan Stadium; San Jose, CA	W 33–6	1,000	
October 3		at Whittier	Hadley Field; Whittier, CA	W 20–0	2,000	
October 10		Occidental	Spartan Stadium; San Jose, CA	W 26–7		
October 17		Pacific (CA)	Spartan Stadium; San Jose, CA (rivalry)	W 29–0		
October 25		at San Francisco	Kezar Stadium; San Francisco, CA	L 13–20	10,000	
November 1		Alameda Coast Guard	Spartan Stadium; San Jose, CA	W 9–0		
November 8		San Diego State	Spartan Stadium; San Jose, CA	W 26–0	3,000	
November 11	2:30 p.m.	at McClellan Field (Note: McClellan Air Force Base was a United States Air Force Base from 1935 to 2001. It was known as McClellan Field from 1939 to 1947.)	Sacramento Stadium; Sacramento, CA	W 27–7	6,000	
November 26		at Fresno State	Ratcliffe Stadium; Fresno, CA (rivary)	L 0–6	10,142	
All times are in Pacific time

== Team players in the NFL ==
The following San Jose State players were selected in the 1946 NFL draft.

Player	Position	Round	Overall	NFL team
Bob Ward	Back	20	189	Washington Redskins

The following player ended his San Jose State career in 1942, was not drafted, but played in the NFL.

Player	Position	NFL team
Hal Crisler	End	1946 Boston Yanks
