= 1942 Santa Clara Broncos football team =

American college football season

1942 Santa Clara Broncos football
- Conference: Independent

Ranking
- AP: No. 15
- Record: 7–2
- Head coach: Buck Shaw (7th season)
- Home stadium: Kezar Stadium

1942 Western college football independents records
	Conf.			Overall
Team	W	L	T	W		L		T
Fresno State		–		9	–	1	–	0
San Jose State		–		7	–	2	–	0
No. 17 Santa Clara		–		7	–	2	–	0
Portland		–		5	–	2	–	0
Idaho Southern Branch		–		4	–	2	–	0
Saint Mary's		–		6	–	3	–	1
San Francisco		–		6	–	4	–	0
Loyola (CA)		–		5	–	4	–	1
Nevada		–		4	–	3	–	1
Cal Poly		–		4	–	3	–	0
San Diego State		–		0	–	6	–	1
San Francisco State		–		0	–	6	–	0
Rankings from AP Poll

The 1942 Santa Clara Broncos football team was an American football team that represented Santa Clara University as an independent during the 1942 college football season. In their seventh season under head coach Buck Shaw, the Broncos compiled a 7–2 record, outscored opponents by a total of 101 to 52, and were ranked No. 15 in the final AP poll. They were ranked at No. 44 (out of 590 college and military teams) in the final rankings under the Litkenhous Difference by Score System.

After winning its first four games against Utah, Stanford, California, and Oregon State, Santa Clara was ranked No. 9 in the AP poll. The team lost to No. 14 UCLA, then rebounded with three consecutive victories, including victories over rivals San Francisco and Saint Mary's. In the final game of the season, the Broncos lost to the powerful service team assembled at Saint Mary's Preflight School.

== Schedule ==
Date	Opponent	Rank	Site	Result	Attendance	Source
September 26	at Utah		Ute Stadium; Salt Lake City, UT	W 12–0	16,000	
October 3	vs. Stanford		Kezar Stadium; San Francisco, CA	W 14–6	30,000	
October 10	at California		California Memorial Stadium; Berkeley, CA	W 7–6	30,000	
October 17	at Oregon State	No. 15	Multnomah Stadium; Portland, OR	W 7–0	8,000	
October 24	at No. 14 UCLA	No. 9	Los Angeles Memorial Coliseum; Los Angeles, CA	L 6–14	45,000	
November 1	at San Francisco		Kezar Stadium; San Francisco, CA	W 8–6	25,000	
November 9	at Loyola (CA)	No. 12	Gilmore Stadium; Los Angeles CA	W 21–0	12,000	
November 14	vs. Saint Mary's		Kezar Stadium; San Francisco, CA	W 20–7	36,000	
November 22	vs. Saint Mary's Pre-Flight	No. 14	Kezar Stadium; San Francisco, CA	L 6–13	25,000	
Rankings from AP Poll released prior to the game

== Rankings ==
Ranking movements Legend: ██ Increase in ranking ██ Decrease in ranking — = Not ranked т = Tied with team above or below ( ) = First-place votes
	Week							
Poll	1	2	3	4	5	6	7	Final
AP	15т (1)	9 (2)	—	15	—	14т	12т	15

== Postseason ==
Two Santa Clara players were recognized on the 1942 College Football All-America Team: end Al Beals received second-team honors from the Central Press Association; and quarterback Jesse Freitas received third-team honors from the Associated Press.

In March 1943, coach Shaw cancelled spring football practice. At that point, 98% of the school's male students were in the Reserve Officers' Training Corps, and their free time was occupied by Army training. Shaw noted that "fall football looks hopeless," and added that it was "improbable that we could get a football team from among the 4-F boys or those under 18."

On August 18, 1943, the school announced that it was abandoning football for the duration of World War II. Athletic director George Barsi noted that 94% of the prior year's student body was in the armed services, and the shortage of manpower made it "inadvisable to field a team". The Broncos did not field a football team again until 1946.
