= Vern Hickey =

American sportsperson and politician (1900–1987)

Biographical details
- Born: November 11, 1900; Canada
- Died: July 14, 1987 (aged 86); Davis, California, U.S.

Playing career

Football
- 1921–1923: Washington State
- Position: Halfback

Coaching career (HC unless noted)

Football
- c. 1930–1936: Santa Rosa HS (CA)
- 1937–1948: Cal Aggies

Baseball
- 1938–1948: Cal Aggies

Administrative career (AD unless noted)
- 1961–1967: UC Davis

Head coaching record
- Overall: 24–42–8 (college football); 49–87–1 (college baseball)

Accomplishments and honors

Championships
- Football; 1 FWC (1947)

Vernard Benton Hickey (November 11, 1900 – July 14, 1987) was an American football, baseball, and golf coach, college athletics administrator, and local politician. He served as the head football coach at the Northern Branch of the College of Agriculture—now known as the University of California, Davis (UC Davis)—from 1947 to 1948, compiling a record of 24–42–8. Hickey was the head baseball coach at the school, serving from 1938 to 1948 and tallying a mark of 49–87–1. He also coached golf, swimming, and water polo at UC Davis. Hickey succeeded Crip Toomey unofficially as the athletic director at UC Davis following Toomey's death in the June 1961 and was officially appointed to the position in September 1963. Hickey also served as the mayor of Davis, California.

A native of Everett, Washington, Hickey graduated from the State College of Washington—now known as Washington State University in 1924. He died on July 14, 1987, in Davis.

== Head coaching record ==
=== College football ===
Year	Team	Overall	Conference	Standing	Bowl/playoffs
Cal Aggies (Far Western Conference) (1937–1948)
1937	Cal Aggies	4–4	2–2	3rd	
1938	Cal Aggies	2–6–1	0–2–1	T–4th	
1939	Cal Aggies	4–4	0–3	5th	
1940	Cal Aggies	4–4–1	2–1	2nd	
1941	Cal Aggies	2–2–4	2–1	2nd	
1942	Cal Aggies	1–6	0–2	3rd	
1943	No team—World War II				
1944	No team—World War II				
1945	No team—World War II				
1946	Cal Aggies	0–5–2	0–1–1	3rd	
1947	Cal Aggies	4–5	3–1	T–1st	
1948	Cal Aggies	2–6	1–3	T–4th	
Cal Aggies:		23–42–8	10–16–2		
Total:		23–42–8			
National championship Conference title Conference division title or championship game berth
