= 1942 UCLA Bruins football team =

American college football season

1942 UCLA Bruins football

PCC champion

Rose Bowl, L 0–9 vs. Georgia
- Conference: Pacific Coast Conference

Ranking
- AP: No. 13
- Record: 7–4 (6–1 PCC)
- Head coach: Edwin C. Horrell (4th season)
- Home stadium: Los Angeles Memorial Coliseum

1942 Pacific Coast Conference football standings
| | Conf. | | | | | Overall |
| Team | W | | L | | T | W | | L | | T |
|---|---|---|---|---|---|---|---|---|---|---|
| No. 13 UCLA $ | 6 | – | 1 | – | 0 | 7 | – | 4 | – | 0 |
| Washington State | 5 | – | 1 | – | 1 | 6 | – | 2 | – | 2 |
| No. 12 Stanford | 5 | – | 2 | – | 0 | 6 | – | 4 | – | 0 |
| USC | 4 | – | 2 | – | 1 | 5 | – | 5 | – | 1 |
| Oregon State | 4 | – | 4 | – | 0 | 4 | – | 5 | – | 1 |
| Washington | 3 | – | 3 | – | 2 | 4 | – | 3 | – | 3 |
| California | 3 | – | 4 | – | 0 | 5 | – | 5 | – | 0 |
| Oregon | 2 | – | 5 | – | 0 | 2 | – | 6 | – | 0 |
| Idaho | 1 | – | 5 | – | 0 | 3 | – | 7 | – | 0 |
| Montana | 0 | – | 6 | – | 0 | 0 | – | 8 | – | 0 |
$ – Conference champion; Rankings from AP Poll

The 1942 UCLA Bruins football team was an American football team that represented the University of California, Los Angeles during the 1942 college football season. In their fourth year under head coach Edwin C. Horrell, the Bruins compiled a 7–4 record (6–1 conference), finished in first place in the Pacific Coast Conference, and lost to Georgia in the 1943 Rose Bowl.

UCLA was ranked at No. 33 (out of 590 college and military teams) in the final rankings under the Litkenhous Difference by Score System for 1942.

== Schedule ==
| Date | Opponent | Rank | Site | Result | Attendance | Source |
|---|---|---|---|---|---|---|
| September 25 | TCU* | | Los Angeles Memorial Coliseum; Los Angeles, CA | L 6–7 | 15,000 | |
| October 3 | Saint Mary's Pre-Flight* | | Los Angeles Memorial Coliseum; Los Angeles, CA | L 7–18 | 20,000 | |
| October 10 | Oregon State | | Los Angeles Memorial Coliseum; Los Angeles, CA | W 30–7 | 35,000 | |
| October 17 | at California | | California Memorial Stadium; Berkeley, CA (rivalry) | W 21–0 | 35,000 | |
| October 24 | No. 9 Santa Clara* | No. 14 | Los Angeles Memorial Coliseum; Los Angeles, CA | W 14–6 | 45,000 | |
| October 31 | Stanford | No. 11 | Los Angeles Memorial Coliseum; Los Angeles, CA | W 20–7 | 55,000 | |
| November 7 | at Oregon | No. 10 | Hayward Field; Eugene, OR | L 7–14 | 8,000 | |
| November 21 | Washington | No. 18 | Los Angeles Memorial Coliseum; Los Angeles, CA | W 14–10 | 35,000 | |
| December 5 | Idaho | No. 13 | Los Angeles Memorial Coliseum; Los Angeles, CA | W 40–13 | 25,000 | |
| December 12 | at USC | No. 13 | Los Angeles Memorial Coliseum; Los Angeles, CA (Victory Bell) | W 14–7 | 87,500 | |
| January 1 | vs. Georgia | No. 13 | Rose Bowl; Pasadena, CA (Rose Bowl) | L 0–9 | 90,000 | |
*Non-conference game; Rankings from AP Poll released prior to the game; Source:

== Rankings ==
Ranking movements Legend: ██ Increase in ranking ██ Decrease in ranking — = Not ranked т = Tied with team above or below ( ) = First-place votes
| | Week | | | | | | | |
| Poll | 1 | 2 | 3 | 4 | 5 | 6 | 7 | Final |
|---|---|---|---|---|---|---|---|---|
| AP | — | 14 | 11 | 10 (1) | 18 | 18т | 11 | 13 |
