= 1942 Chico State Wildcats football team =

American college football season

1942 Chico State Wildcats football
- Conference: Far Western Conference
- Record: 5–1 (1–1 FWC)
- Head coach: Roy Bohler (4th season)
- Home stadium: College Field

1942 Far Western Conference football standings
	Conf.					Overall
Team	W		L		T	W		L		T
Pacific (CA) $	2	–	0	–	0	2	–	6	–	1
Chico State	1	–	1	–	0	5	–	1	–	0
Cal Aggies	0	–	2	–	0	1	–	6	–	0
$ – Conference champion

The 1942 Chico State Wildcats football team represented Chico State College—now known as California State University, Chico—as a member of the Far Western Conference (FWC) during the 1942 college football season. Led by fourth-year head coach Roy Bohler, Chico State compiled an overall record of 5–1 with a mark of 1–1 in conference play, placing second in the FWC. The team outscored its opponents 95 to 45 for the season.

Chico State was ranked at No. 323 (out of 590 college and military teams) in the final rankings under the Litkenhous Difference by Score System for 1942.

The Wildcats played home games at College Field in Chico, California.

== Schedule ==
Date	Time	Opponent	Site	Result	Source
October 3		at Pacific (CA)	Baxter Stadium; Stockton, CA	L 6–27	
October 10		San Francisco State*	College Field; Chico, CA	W 15–0	
October 16		Yuba*	College Field; Chico, CA	W 14–0	
October 24		Cal Aggies^{†}	College Field; Chico, CA	W 6–0	
November 5		Yuba*	Knight Park; Marysville, CA	W 34–6	
November 11	2:30 p.m.	Sacramento*	College Field; Chico, CA	W 26–13	
*Non-conference game; ^{†}Homecoming; All times are in Pacific time
