= 1942 San Francisco State Gaters football team =

American college football season

1942 San Francisco State Gaters football
- Conference: Independent
- Record: 0–6
- Head coach: Ray Kaufman (1st season; first 4 games); Dan Farmer (5th season, final 2 games)
- Home stadium: Campus field

1942 Western college football independents records
	Conf.			Overall
Team	W	L	T	W		L		T
Fresno State		–		9	–	1	–	0
San Jose State		–		7	–	2	–	0
No. 17 Santa Clara		–		7	–	2	–	0
Portland		–		5	–	2	–	0
Idaho Southern Branch		–		4	–	2	–	0
Saint Mary's		–		6	–	3	–	1
San Francisco		–		6	–	4	–	0
Loyola (CA)		–		5	–	4	–	1
Nevada		–		4	–	3	–	1
Cal Poly		–		4	–	3	–	0
San Diego State		–		0	–	6	–	1
San Francisco State		–		0	–	6	–	0
Rankings from AP Poll

The 1942 San Francisco State States football team represented San Francisco State College—now known as San Francisco State University—as an independent during the 1942 college football season. San Francisco State was led by first-year head coach Ray Kaufman for the first four games of the season. When he was called into the military, Dan Farmer, who had served as co-head coach from 1935 to 1938, took over the team for the final two games of the season. The Gaters finished the season with an overall record of 0–6 and were outscored by their opponents 156 to 12. They played home games at a new stadium in San Francisco, which was later named Cox Stadium. San Francisco State did not field another team until 1945.

== Schedule ==
Date	Opponent	Site	Result	Attendance	Source
October 3	at McClellan Field (Note: McClellan Air Force Base was a United States Air Force Base from 1935 to 2001. It was known as McClellan Field from 1939 to 1947.)	Grant Union High School; Sacramento, CA	L 6–26		
October 9	at Chico State	Chico High School Stadium; Chico, CA	L 0–15		
October 17	Salinas	Salinas, CA	L 0–25		
October 23	San Francisco Junior College	Campus field; San Francisco, CA	L 0–6	2,500	
October 30	Santa Rosa*	Campus field; San Francisco, CA	L 6–33		
November 7	Cal Poly	Campus field; San Francisco, CA	L 0–51		
November 14	at Mather Field Air Corps (Note: Mather Air Force Base was a United States Air Force Base from 1918 to 1993.)	Sacramento, CA	Cancelled		
*Non-conference game
