= 1942 San Francisco Dons football team =

American college football season

1942 San Francisco Dons football
- Conference: Independent
- Record: 6–4
- Head coach: Al Tassi (1st season)
- Home stadium: Kezar Stadium

1942 Western college football independents records
	Conf.			Overall
Team	W	L	T	W		L		T
Fresno State		–		9	–	1	–	0
San Jose State		–		7	–	2	–	0
No. 17 Santa Clara		–		7	–	2	–	0
Portland		–		5	–	2	–	0
Idaho Southern Branch		–		4	–	2	–	0
Saint Mary's		–		6	–	3	–	1
San Francisco		–		6	–	4	–	0
Loyola (CA)		–		5	–	4	–	1
Nevada		–		4	–	3	–	1
Cal Poly		–		4	–	3	–	0
San Diego State		–		0	–	6	–	1
San Francisco State		–		0	–	6	–	0
Rankings from AP Poll

The 1942 San Francisco Dons football team was an American football team that represented the University of San Francisco as an independent during the 1942 college football season. In their first season under head coach Al Tassi, the Dons compiled a 6–4 record and outscored their opponents by a combined total of 221 to 106.

San Francisco was ranked at No. 66 (out of 590 college and military teams) in the final rankings under the Litkenhous Difference by Score System for 1942.

== Schedule ==
Date	Opponent	Site	Result	Attendance	Source
September 27	Arizona State	Kezar Stadium; San Francisco, CA	W 54–6	12,000	
October 4	Nevada	Kezar Stadium; San Francisco, CA	W 27–7	12,000	
October 11	Loyola (CA)	Kezar Stadium; San Francisco, CA	L 2–7	12,000	
October 18	Saint Mary's	Kezar Stadium; San Francisco, CA	L 0–27	35,000	
October 25	San Jose State	Kezar Stadium; San Francisco, CA	W 20–13	10,000	
November 1	Santa Clara	Kezar Stadium; San Francisco, CA	L 6–8	25,000	
November 11	at Fresno State	Ratcliffe Stadium; Fresno, CA	W 33–13	12,519	
November 22	Alameda Coast Guard	Kezar Stadium; San Francisco, CA	W 44–6		
November 29	at Albuquerque AAB	Hilltop Stadium; Albuquerque, NM	W 28–0		
December 5	vs. No. 16 Mississippi State	Crump Stadium; Memphis, TN	L 7–19	250	
Rankings from AP Poll released prior to the game
