= 1942 Portland Pilots football team =

American college football season

1942 Portland Pilots football
- Conference: Independent
- Record: 5–2
- Head coach: Robert L. Mathews (6th season)
- Home stadium: Multnomah Stadium

1942 Western college football independents records
	Conf.			Overall
Team	W	L	T	W		L		T
Fresno State		–		9	–	1	–	0
San Jose State		–		7	–	2	–	0
No. 17 Santa Clara		–		7	–	2	–	0
Portland		–		5	–	2	–	0
Idaho Southern Branch		–		4	–	2	–	0
Saint Mary's		–		6	–	3	–	1
San Francisco		–		6	–	4	–	0
Loyola (CA)		–		5	–	4	–	1
Nevada		–		4	–	3	–	1
Cal Poly		–		4	–	3	–	0
San Diego State		–		0	–	6	–	1
San Francisco State		–		0	–	6	–	0
Rankings from AP Poll

The 1942 Portland Pilots football team was an American football team that represented the University of Portland as an independent during the 1942 college football season. In its sixth and final year under head coach Robert L. Mathews, the team compiled a 5–2 record. The team played its home games at Multnomah Stadium in Portland, Oregon.

Players included Larry Beil.

Portland was ranked at No. 119 (out of 590 college and military teams) in the final rankings under the Litkenhous Difference by Score System for 1942.

== Schedule ==
Date	Opponent	Site	Result	Attendance	Source
September 26	Pacific (OR)	Multnomah Stadium; Portland, OR	W 46–0		
October 3	Willamette	Multnomah Stadium; Portland, OR	W 34–13		
October 10	at Western Washington	Battersby Field; Bellingham, WA	W 26–0		
October 17	vs. Second Air Force	Ute Stadium; Salt Lake City, UT	L 13–20	5,000	
October 24	at Saint Martin's	Olympia, WA	W 39–6		
November 7	Pacific Lutheran	Multnomah Stadium; Portland, OR	W 41–0		
November 21	at Idaho	Public School Field; Boise, ID	L 14–20	6,000	
