= 1942 Oregon State Beavers football team =

American college football season

1942 Oregon State Beavers football
- Conference: Pacific Coast Conference
- Record: 4–5–1 (4–4 PCC)
- Head coach: Lon Stiner (10th season)
- Home stadium: Bell Field, Multnomah Stadium

1942 Pacific Coast Conference football standings
	Conf.					Overall
Team	W		L		T	W		L		T
No. 13 UCLA $	6	–	1	–	0	7	–	4	–	0
Washington State	5	–	1	–	1	6	–	2	–	2
No. 12 Stanford	5	–	2	–	0	6	–	4	–	0
USC	4	–	2	–	1	5	–	5	–	1
Oregon State	4	–	4	–	0	4	–	5	–	1
Washington	3	–	3	–	2	4	–	3	–	3
California	3	–	4	–	0	5	–	5	–	0
Oregon	2	–	5	–	0	2	–	6	–	0
Idaho	1	–	5	–	0	3	–	7	–	0
Montana	0	–	6	–	0	0	–	8	–	0
$ – Conference champion; Rankings from AP Poll

The 1942 Oregon State Beavers football team represented Oregon State College (OSC) in the Pacific Coast Conference (PCC) during the 1942 college football season. In their 10th season under head coach Lon Stiner, the Beavers compiled a 4–5–1 record (4–4 against PCC opponents), finished in fifth place in the PCC, and outscored their opponents, 157 to 142 The team played home games at Bell Field in Corvallis, Oregon.

Oregon State was ranked at No. 70 (out of 590 college and military teams) in the final rankings under the Litkenhous Difference by Score System for 1942.

Due to World War II, this was season of Oregon State football until 1945.

== Schedule ==
Date	Opponent	Site	Result	Attendance	Source
September 26	at Idaho	Neale Stadium; Moscow, ID	W 32–0	7,000	
October 3	California	Bell Field; Corvallis, OR	W 13–8	12,000	
October 10	at UCLA	Los Angeles Memorial Coliseum; Los Angeles, CA	L 7–30	35,000	
October 17	No. 15 Santa Clara*	Multnomah Stadium; Portland, OR	L 0–7	8,000	
October 24	Washington State	Multnomah Stadium; Portland, OR	L 13–26	20,000	
October 31	at Washington	Husky Stadium; Seattle, WA	L 0–13	7,000	
November 7	Montana	Bell Field; Corvallis, OR	W 33–0		
November 14	at Stanford	Stanford Stadium; Stanford, CA	L 13–49	4,000	
November 21	Oregon^{†}	Bell Field; Corvallis, OR (rivalry)	W 39–2	12,000	
November 28	at Michigan State*	Macklin Field; East Lansing, MI	T 7–7	5,368	
*Non-conference game; ^{†}Homecoming; Rankings from Coaches' Poll released prior to the game
