= 1942 Montana Grizzlies football team =

American college football season

1942 Montana Grizzlies football
- Conference: Pacific Coast Conference
- Record: 0–8 (0–6 PCC)
- Head coach: Clyde Carpenter (1st season)
- Home stadium: Dornblaser Field

1942 Pacific Coast Conference football standings
	Conf.					Overall
Team	W		L		T	W		L		T
No. 13 UCLA $	6	–	1	–	0	7	–	4	–	0
Washington State	5	–	1	–	1	6	–	2	–	2
No. 12 Stanford	5	–	2	–	0	6	–	4	–	0
USC	4	–	2	–	1	5	–	5	–	1
Oregon State	4	–	4	–	0	4	–	5	–	1
Washington	3	–	3	–	2	4	–	3	–	3
California	3	–	4	–	0	5	–	5	–	0
Oregon	2	–	5	–	0	2	–	6	–	0
Idaho	1	–	5	–	0	3	–	7	–	0
Montana	0	–	6	–	0	0	–	8	–	0
$ – Conference champion; Rankings from AP Poll

The 1942 Montana Grizzlies football team represented the University of Montana in the 1942 college football season as a member of the Pacific Coast Conference (PCC).

Clyde Carpenter led the Grizzlies in his only season as head coach; they played their three home games on campus in Missoula at Dornblaser Field and lost all eight games (0–6 in PCC, last), shut out in the final five, all in conference.

Montana was ranked at No. 272 (out of 590 college and military teams) in the final rankings under the Litkenhous Difference by Score System for 1942.

With manpower shortages due to World War II, Montana's football program went on hiatus after this season and resumed play in 1945.

== Schedule ==
Date	Opponent	Site	Result	Attendance	Source
September 26	BYU*	Dornblaser Field; Missoula, MT	L 6–12		
October 3	Mather Field*	Dornblaser Field; Missoula, MT	L 13–19	2,000	
October 10	at Washington State	Rogers Field; Pullman, WA	L 16–68	10,000	
October 17	at Washington	Husky Stadium; Seattle, WA	L 0–35	8,000	
October 31	Idaho	Dornblaser Field; Missoula, MT (Little Brown Stein)	L 0–21	2,000	
November 7	at Oregon State	Bell Field; Corvallis, OR	L 0–33		
November 14	at California	California Memorial Stadium; Berkeley, CA	L 0–13		
December 5	at USC	Los Angeles Memorial Coliseum; Los Angeles, CA	L 0–38	25,000	
*Non-conference game; Source:
