= 1942 Oregon Ducks football team =

American college football season

1942 Oregon Ducks football
- Conference: Pacific Coast Conference
- Record: 2–6 (2–5 PCC)
- Head coach: John A. Warren (1st season)
- Captain: None
- Home stadium: Hayward Field, Multnomah Stadium

1942 Pacific Coast Conference football standings
	Conf.					Overall
Team	W		L		T	W		L		T
No. 13 UCLA $	6	–	1	–	0	7	–	4	–	0
Washington State	5	–	1	–	1	6	–	2	–	2
No. 12 Stanford	5	–	2	–	0	6	–	4	–	0
USC	4	–	2	–	1	5	–	5	–	1
Oregon State	4	–	4	–	0	4	–	5	–	1
Washington	3	–	3	–	2	4	–	3	–	3
California	3	–	4	–	0	5	–	5	–	0
Oregon	2	–	5	–	0	2	–	6	–	0
Idaho	1	–	5	–	0	3	–	7	–	0
Montana	0	–	6	–	0	0	–	8	–	0
$ – Conference champion; Rankings from AP Poll

The 1942 Oregon Ducks football team represented the University of Oregon in the Pacific Coast Conference (PCC) during the 1942 college football season. In their first and only season under head coach John A. Warren, the Ducks compiled a 2–6 record (2–5 in PCC, eighth), and were outscored 138 to 67.

Oregon was ranked at No. 96 (out of 590 college and military teams) in the final rankings under the Litkenhous Difference by Score System for 1942.

Two home games were played on campus at Hayward Field in Eugene and two at Multnomah Stadium in Portland.

== Schedule ==
Date	Opponent	Site	Result	Attendance	Source
September 26	Saint Mary's Pre-Flight*	Multnomah Stadium; Portland, OR	L 9–10	10,000	
October 3	at Washington State	Rogers Field; Pullman, WA	L 0–7	8,000	
October 10	Washington	Multnomah Stadium; Portland, OR (rivalry)	L 7–15	13,000	
October 24	Idaho	Hayward Field; Eugene, OR	W 28–0	4,000	
October 31	at California	California Memorial Stadium; Berkeley, CA	L 7–20	30,000	
November 7	No. 10 UCLA	Hayward Field; Eugene, OR	W 14–7	8,000	
November 14	at USC	Los Angeles Memorial Coliseum; Los Angeles, CA	L 0–40	40,000	
November 21	at Oregon State	Bell Field; Corvallis, OR (rivalry)	L 2–39	12,000	
*Non-conference game; Rankings from AP Poll released prior to the game
