= 1942 Cal Poly Mustangs football team =

American college football season

1942 Cal Poly Mustangs football
- Conference: Independent
- Record: 4–3
- Head coach: Bob Dakan (1st season)
- Home stadium: Mustang Stadium

1942 Western college football independents records
	Conf.			Overall
Team	W	L	T	W		L		T
Fresno State		–		9	–	1	–	0
San Jose State		–		7	–	2	–	0
No. 17 Santa Clara		–		7	–	2	–	0
Portland		–		5	–	2	–	0
Idaho Southern Branch		–		4	–	2	–	0
Saint Mary's		–		6	–	3	–	1
San Francisco		–		6	–	4	–	0
Loyola (CA)		–		5	–	4	–	1
Nevada		–		4	–	3	–	1
Cal Poly		–		4	–	3	–	0
San Diego State		–		0	–	6	–	1
San Francisco State		–		0	–	6	–	0
Rankings from AP Poll

The 1942 Cal Poly Mustangs football team represented California Polytechnic School—now known as California Polytechnic State University, San Luis Obispo—as an independent during the 1942 college football season. Led by Bob Dakan in his first and only season as head coach, Cal Poly compiled a record of 4–3. The team outscored its opponents 179 to 105 for the season.

Cal Poly was ranked at No. 352 (out of 590 college and military teams) in the final rankings under the Litkenhous Difference by Score System for 1942.

The Mustangs played home games at Mustang Stadium in San Luis Obispo, California.

Due to World War II, Cal Poly did not field another team until 1945.

== Schedule ==
Date	Opponent	Site	Result	Attendance	Source
September 26	at Nevada	Mackay Stadium (Note: This stadium is the predecessor to the current Mackay Stadium, which was opened for the 1966 season.); Reno, NV	L 0–18		
October 4	Fort Ord	Mustang Stadium; San Luis Obispo, CA	W 26–7		
October 17	at Whittier	Hadley Field; Whittier, CA	L 6–47		
October 25	Stockton Army Base	Stockton, California	W 68–0		
October 31	San Diego State	Mustang Stadium; San Luis Obispo, CA	W 32–13	1,500	
November 7	at San Francisco State	Campus field; San Francisco, CA	W 51–0		
November 14	Occidental	Mustang Stadium; San Luis Obispo, CA	L 6–20		
