= 1942 Nevada Wolf Pack football team =

American college football season

1942 Nevada Wolf Pack football
- Conference: Independent
- Record: 4–3–1
- Head coach: Jim Aiken (4th season)
- Home stadium: Mackay Field

1942 Western college football independents records
	Conf.			Overall
Team	W	L	T	W		L		T
Fresno State		–		9	–	1	–	0
San Jose State		–		7	–	2	–	0
No. 17 Santa Clara		–		7	–	2	–	0
Portland		–		5	–	2	–	0
Idaho Southern Branch		–		4	–	2	–	0
Saint Mary's		–		6	–	3	–	1
San Francisco		–		6	–	4	–	0
Loyola (CA)		–		5	–	4	–	1
Nevada		–		4	–	3	–	1
Cal Poly		–		4	–	3	–	0
San Diego State		–		0	–	6	–	1
San Francisco State		–		0	–	6	–	0
Rankings from AP Poll

The 1942 Nevada Wolf Pack football team was an American football team that represented the University of Nevada as an independent during the 1942 college football season. In their fourth season under head coach Jim Aiken, the team compiled a 4–3–1 record.

Marion Motley, who was later inducted into the Pro Football Hall of Fame, played for the Wolf Pack from 1941 to 1943.

Nevada was ranked at No. 155 (out of 590 college and military teams) in the final rankings under the Litkenhous Difference by Score System for 1942.

== Schedule ==
Date	Time	Opponent	Site	Result	Attendance	Source
September 26		Cal Poly	Mackay Field; Reno, NV	W 18–0		
October 4		at San Francisco	Kezar Stadium; San Francisco, CA	L 7–27	12,000	
October 11		at Saint Mary's	Emeryville Ball Park; Oakland, CA	L 6–20	6,000	
October 17		Stockton Motor Base	Mackay Field; Reno, NV	W 33–0		
October 24	2:15 p.m.	Santa Ana AAB	Mackay Field; Reno, NV	W 3–0		
October 31		New Mexico^{†}	Mackay Field; Reno, NV	T 0–0	3,000	
November 7		at No. 18 Fresno State	Ratcliffe Stadium; Fresno, CA	L 0–33	4,271	
November 11		Cal Aggies	Mackay Field; Reno, NV	W 14–0		
^{†}Homecoming; Rankings from AP Poll released prior to the game; All times are in Pacific time
