= 1942 Loyola Lions football team =

American college football season

1942 Loyola Lions football
- Conference: Independent
- Record: 5–4–1
- Head coach: Bernie Bradley (1st season)
- Home stadium: Gilmore Stadium

1942 Western college football independents records
	Conf.			Overall
Team	W	L	T	W		L		T
Fresno State		–		9	–	1	–	0
San Jose State		–		7	–	2	–	0
No. 17 Santa Clara		–		7	–	2	–	0
Portland		–		5	–	2	–	0
Idaho Southern Branch		–		4	–	2	–	0
Saint Mary's		–		6	–	3	–	1
San Francisco		–		6	–	4	–	0
Loyola (CA)		–		5	–	4	–	1
Nevada		–		4	–	3	–	1
Cal Poly		–		4	–	3	–	0
San Diego State		–		0	–	6	–	1
San Francisco State		–		0	–	6	–	0
Rankings from AP Poll

The 1942 Loyola Lions football team was an American football team that represented Loyola University of Los Angeles (now known as Loyola Marymount University) as an independent during the 1942 college football season. In their first season under head coach Bernie Bradley, the Lions compiled a 5–4–1 record.

Loyola was ranked at No. 130 (out of 590 college and military teams) in the final rankings under the Litkenhous Difference by Score System for 1942.

== Schedule ==
Date	Time	Opponent	Site	Result	Attendance	Source
September 19		Redlands	Gilmore Stadium; Los Angeles, CA	W 27–0	3,800	
September 26		Occidental	Gilmore Stadium; Los Angeles, CA	W 25–0		
October 11		at San Francisco	Kezar Stadium; San Francisco, CA	W 7–2	12,000	
October 18		Alameda Coast Guard	Gilmore Stadium; Los Angeles, CA	W 38–6	10,000	
October 25		Saint Mary's	Gilmore Stadium; Los Angeles, CA	L 0–13	18,000	
November 1		at Saint Louis	Walsh Stadium; St. Louis, MO	L 6–20	6,545	
November 9		No. 12 Santa Clara	Gilmore Stadium; Los Angeles, CA	L 0–21	12,000	
November 15	2:15 p.m.	Santa Ana AAB	Gilmore Stadium; Los Angeles, CA	W 13–0	5,000	
November 22		New Mexico	Gilmore Stadium; Los Angeles, CA	T 14–14	6,000	
November 29		Fresno State	Gilmore Stadium; Los Angeles, CA	L 6–27	10,000	
Rankings from AP Poll released prior to the game; All times are in Pacific time
