= 1942 Stanford Indians football team =

American college football season

1942 Stanford Indians football
- Conference: Pacific Coast Conference

Ranking
- AP: No. 12
- Record: 6–4 (5–2 PCC)
- Head coach: Marchmont Schwartz (1st season)
- Home stadium: Stanford Stadium

1942 Pacific Coast Conference football standings
	Conf.					Overall
Team	W		L		T	W		L		T
No. 13 UCLA $	6	–	1	–	0	7	–	4	–	0
Washington State	5	–	1	–	1	6	–	2	–	2
No. 12 Stanford	5	–	2	–	0	6	–	4	–	0
USC	4	–	2	–	1	5	–	5	–	1
Oregon State	4	–	4	–	0	4	–	5	–	1
Washington	3	–	3	–	2	4	–	3	–	3
California	3	–	4	–	0	5	–	5	–	0
Oregon	2	–	5	–	0	2	–	6	–	0
Idaho	1	–	5	–	0	3	–	7	–	0
Montana	0	–	6	–	0	0	–	8	–	0
$ – Conference champion; Rankings from AP Poll

The 1942 Stanford Indians football team represented Stanford University as a member of the Pacific Coast Conference (PCC) during the 1942 college football season and was led by first-year head coach Marchmont Schwartz. With the United States now fully engaged in World War II, Stanford played three "home" games at Kezar Stadium in San Francisco in order to comply with wartime requirements to minimize the use of non-essential public transportation by holding events near population centers. The team also played four games at its usual home stadium, Stanford Stadium.

Stanford suspended football after this season, resuming in 1946.

== Schedule ==
Date	Opponent	Rank	Site	Result	Attendance	Source
September 26	Washington State		Stanford Stadium; Stanford, CA	L 0–6	15,000	
October 3	vs. Santa Clara*		Kezar Stadium; San Francisco, CA	L 6–14	30,000	
October 10	at Notre Dame*		Notre Dame Stadium; Notre Dame, IN (rivalry)	L 0–27	30,000	
October 17	Idaho		Stanford Stadium; Stanford, CA	W 54–7	5,000	
October 24	vs. USC		Kezar Stadium; San Francisco, CA (rivalry)	W 14–6	20,000	
October 31	at No. 11 UCLA		Los Angeles Memorial Coliseum; Los Angeles, CA	L 7–20	55,000	
November 7	vs. Washington		Kezar Stadium; San Francisco, CA	W 20–7	20,000	
November 14	Oregon State		Stanford Stadium; Stanford, CA	W 49–13	4,000	
November 21	at California		California Memorial Stadium; Berkeley, CA (Big Game)	W 26–7	45,000	
November 28	St. Mary's Pre-Flight*	No. 12	Stanford Stadium; Stanford, CA	W 28–13	10,000	
*Non-conference game; Rankings from AP Poll released prior to the game; Source:

== Rankings ==
Ranking movements Legend: ██ Increase in ranking ██ Decrease in ranking — = Not ranked т = Tied with team above or below
	Week							
Poll	1	2	3	4	5	6	7	Final
AP	—	—	—	—	—	—	12т	12

== Players drafted by the NFL ==
Player	Position	Round	Pick	NFL club
Chuck Taylor	Guard	4	30	Cleveland Rams
Ed Stamm	Tackle	5	39	Chicago Bears
Bruno Banducci	Guard	6	42	Philadelphia-Pittsburgh Eagles-Steelers
Milt Vucinich	Center	7	59	Chicago Bears
Ray Hammett	Back	11	99	Chicago Bears
Hank Norberg	End	18	169	Chicago Bears
