= 1942 Fresno State Bulldogs football team =

American college football season

1942 Fresno State Bulldogs football
- Conference: Independent
- Record: 9–1
- Head coach: James Bradshaw (7th season)
- Home stadium: Ratcliffe Stadium

1942 Western college football independents records
	Conf.			Overall
Team	W	L	T	W		L		T
Fresno State		–		9	–	1	–	0
San Jose State		–		7	–	2	–	0
No. 17 Santa Clara		–		7	–	2	–	0
Portland		–		5	–	2	–	0
Idaho Southern Branch		–		4	–	2	–	0
Saint Mary's		–		6	–	3	–	1
San Francisco		–		6	–	4	–	0
Loyola (CA)		–		5	–	4	–	1
Nevada		–		4	–	3	–	1
Cal Poly		–		4	–	3	–	0
San Diego State		–		0	–	6	–	1
San Francisco State		–		0	–	6	–	0
Rankings from AP Poll

The 1942 Fresno State Bulldogs football team represented Fresno State Normal School—now known as California State University, Fresno—as an independent during the 1942 college football season. Fresno State had been a member of the California Collegiate Athletic Association (CCAA) in 1941, but the conference suspended operating during World War II. Led by seventh-year head coach James Bradshaw, the Bulldogs compiled a record of 9–1. They outscored opponents 362 to 45 for season, and shut out opponents seven times. Fresno State played home games at Ratcliffe Stadium on the campus of Fresno City College in Fresno, California.

Fresno State was ranked at No. 43 (out of 590 college and military teams) in the final rankings under the Litkenhous Difference by Score System for 1942.

== Schedule ==
Date	Opponent	Rank	Site	Result	Attendance	Source
September 26	Whittier		Ratcliffe Stadium; Fresno, CA	W 51–0	4,272	
October 3	Occidental		Ratcliffe Stadium; Fresno, CA	W 53–6	3,925	
October 11	at San Diego State		Aztec Bowl; San Diego, CA (rivalry)	W 66–0	6,500	
October 18	March Field		Ratcliffe Stadium; Fresno, CA	W 20–0	7,521	
October 25	Fort Ord (Note: Fort Ord was an Army post on Monterey Bay, California from 1917 to 1994.)		Ratcliffe Stadium; Fresno, CA	W 80–0	5,979	
October 31	at Pacific (CA)		Baxter Stadium; Stockton, CA	W 13–0	3,500	
November 7	Nevada	No. 18	Ratcliffe Stadium; Fresno, CA	W 33–0	4,271	
November 11	San Francisco		Ratcliffe Stadium; Fresno, CA	L 13–33	12,519	
November 26	San Jose State		Ratcliffe Stadium; Fresno, CA (rivalry)	W 6–0	10,142	
November 29	at Loyola (CA)		Gilmore Stadium; Los Angeles, CA	W 27–6	10,000	
Rankings from AP Poll released prior to the game

== Rankings ==
Ranking movements Legend: ██ Increase in ranking ██ Decrease in ranking — = Not ranked ( ) = First-place votes
	Week							
Poll	1	2	3	4	5	6	7	Final
AP	—	—	—	18 (1)	—	—	—	—

== Team players in the NFL ==
The following Fresno State Bulldog players were selected in the 1944 NFL draft.

Player	Position	Round	Overall	NFL Team
Jackie Fellows	Back	6	50	Washington Redskins
Jim Molich	End	15	145	Detroit Lions
Roy Renfro	Guard	22	224	New York Giants
