= 1943 Rose Bowl =

American college football game

- 29th Rose Bowl Game
| Georgia Bulldogs | UCLA Bruins |
| (10–1) | (7–3) |
| SEC | PCC |
| 9 | 0 |
| Head coach: Wally Butts | Head coach: Edwin C. Horrell |
| AP 2 | AP 13 |
| | 1 | 2 | 3 | 4 | Total |
|---|---|---|---|---|---|
| Georgia | 0 | 0 | 0 | 9 | 9 |
| UCLA | 0 | 0 | 0 | 0 | 0 |
- Date: January 1, 1943
- Season: 1942
- Stadium: Rose Bowl
- Location: Pasadena, California
- MVP: Charley Trippi, Georgia
- Favorite: Georgia: 13 to 5 odds
- National anthem: UCLA Band
- Referee: Orian Landreth (Pacific Coast; split crew: Pacific Coast, SEC)
- Halftime show: UCLA Band, Pasadena City College band
- Attendance: 93,000

The 1943 Rose Bowl game was the 29th edition of the college football bowl game, played at the Rose Bowl in Pasadena, California, on Friday, January 1. The second-ranked Georgia Bulldogs of the Southeastern Conference (SEC) defeated the No. 13 UCLA Bruins of the Pacific Coast Conference (PCC), 9–0.

The game returned to the Rose Bowl in Pasadena after being played in North Carolina at Duke Stadium in Durham the year before. Charley Trippi of Georgia was named the Player of the Game when the award was created in 1953 and selections were made retroactively.

After the 1942 Allied victory in the Battle of Midway and the end of the Japanese offensives in the Pacific Theater during 1942, it was deemed that the West Coast was no longer vulnerable to attack, and the Rose Bowl game returned to southern California. On October 10, 1942, the decision was announced that the game would be played, pending approval of the Army, however, the parade still would not be held. By November 5, 1942, it was announced that the East-West Game could occur in San Francisco. On November 18, the Rose Bowl was permitted by the Western Defense Command.

Few Georgia fans were able to make the trip because of travel restrictions, and there were many military servicemen in attendance. The Tournament of Roses parade itself still was not held due to the war. Due to the number of American servicemen stationed in Australia, the game was broadcast live on Australian radio.

== Teams ==
=== UCLA Bruins ===
UCLA won the Pacific Coast Conference title for the first time in school history. The Bruins also won their first victory in the UCLA–USC rivalry. This Rose Bowl game was the first appearance for the Bruins in the post season since their Poi Bowl (later the Pineapple Bowl) victory in 1939.

The previous season saw UCLA and USC tie 7–7 in a matchup of lower-tier teams. They had played that year (unwittingly) on the eve of America's entry into World War II, on December 6, 1941.

In 1942, the Bruins and Trojans met with the Rose Bowl on the line for both teams. On December 12, 1942, UCLA defeated USC for the first time 14–7.

=== Georgia Bulldogs ===
The Tournament of Roses committee were responsible for selecting and inviting the opposing team. For their final games in the 1942 season, the second-ranked Georgia Tech Yellow Jackets (at 9–0) traveled to Athens to face the fifth-ranked Bulldogs (at 9–1) for their rivalry game. The Bulldogs defeated the Engineers 34–0, and were awarded the Rose Bowl Bid on November 28, 1942. Georgia finished the number two team in the nation behind number one Ohio State. The Western Conference, forerunner of the Big Ten Conference, did not permit their teams to play in bowl games until the 1946 agreement between the Big Nine and the PCC. The Bulldogs featured 1942 Heisman Trophy winner Frank Sinkwich, Maxwell Award winner Charley Trippi, and Jim Todd (Laurens, SC) backing up Trippi. The Bulldogs had been named national champions by the Berryman, DeVold, Houlgate, Litkenhous, Poling, and Williamson polls. Georgia had played their first bowl game the previous year, the 1942 Orange Bowl.

== Scoring summary ==
The Temperature was 72 °F (22 °C) and sunny in Pasadena. UCLA wore gold helmets, white jerseys, and gold pants. Georgia had silver helmets, red jerseys, and gray pants.

The game was scoreless until the fourth quarter. The Bulldogs had 25 first downs to the Bruins' 5. In the fourth quarter, the Bruins were backed up against the south goal line. Bob Waterfield attempted the punt 10 yards back from the line of scrimmage as was the custom at the time. The punt was blocked out of the end zone.

=== First quarter ===
No scoring

=== Second quarter ===
No scoring

=== Third quarter ===
No scoring

=== Fourth quarter ===
- Georgia — Willard "Red" Boyd blocks Bob Waterfield's punt out of bounds for an automatic safety.
- Georgia — Frank Sinkwich, one-yard run. Leo Costa converts.

=== Statistics ===
| Team stats | Georgia | UCLA |
|---|---|---|
| First downs | 22 | 4 |
| Net yards rushing | 212 | 88 |
| Net Yards Passing | 167 | 69 |
| Total yards | 379 | 157 |
| PC–PA–Int. | 12–30–2 | 4–15–4 |
| Punts Avg. | 34 | 34.6 |

== Aftermath ==
The UCLA Bruins had 5 first downs to Georgia's 25 and were regarded as no match for the Bulldogs. The Bruins were considered lucky to have held Georgia to 9 points. Georgia coach Wally Butts was reportedly sweating over the Bruins' defense during the game. A spectator in the stadium died of a heart attack during the game. The Georgia team remained in town a day to celebrate after the game. The team got a studio tour and met with Hollywood stars.

The UCLA team also received star attention. UCLA fans Mickey Rooney and Ava Gardner rented the Cocoanut Grove Ballroom at the Ambassador Hotel for a party for the Bruins football team.

Charley Trippi of Georgia was named the Rose Bowl Player of the Game when the award was created in 1953 and selections were made retroactively. Lynn "Buck" Compton, who played for UCLA, and started at guard in the game, later earned a Silver Star for his meritorious action at Brécourt Manor. The action was later dramatized in episode two of the HBO miniseries Band of Brothers. According to Lynn "Buck" Compton(See "Call of Duty" by Lt. Lynn Buck Compton, Life, before, during, and after the "Band of Brothers), shortly after the game, the entire Senior Class of those players, who were also in ROTC, were taken into the military, prior to graduation and sent to Officer Candidate School. Buck went on to Ft. Benning Georgia.

Because of the agreement made in 1946 by what are now the Big Ten and the Pac-12 Conferences (and their respective predecessors), this was Georgia's lone appearance in the Rose Bowl game until the agreements that starting in the 1998 season, the Rose Bowl would be part of any national championship format. That agreement meant Georgia would not appear until the 2018 game, when they were the third seed in the College Football Playoff in the year the game was a semifinal game. For the 2008 Rose Bowl, a hopeful matchup was examined that Georgia might play USC, but the Sugar Bowl would not give up the Bulldogs.

During World War II, UCLA left end Milt "Snuffy" Smith was critically injured when his crew was struck by a missile. When he was about to be declared a hopeless case and to be abandoned, a medic saw his "Rose Bowl, 1943" engraved wrist watch he was wearing and shouted, "This is one guy we’ve got to save." Smith recovered after 18 months of hospitalization.

Georgia would not return to the Rose Bowl game until January 1, 2018—an absence of 75 years.
