= Edwin C. Horrell =

American football player and coach (1902–1992)

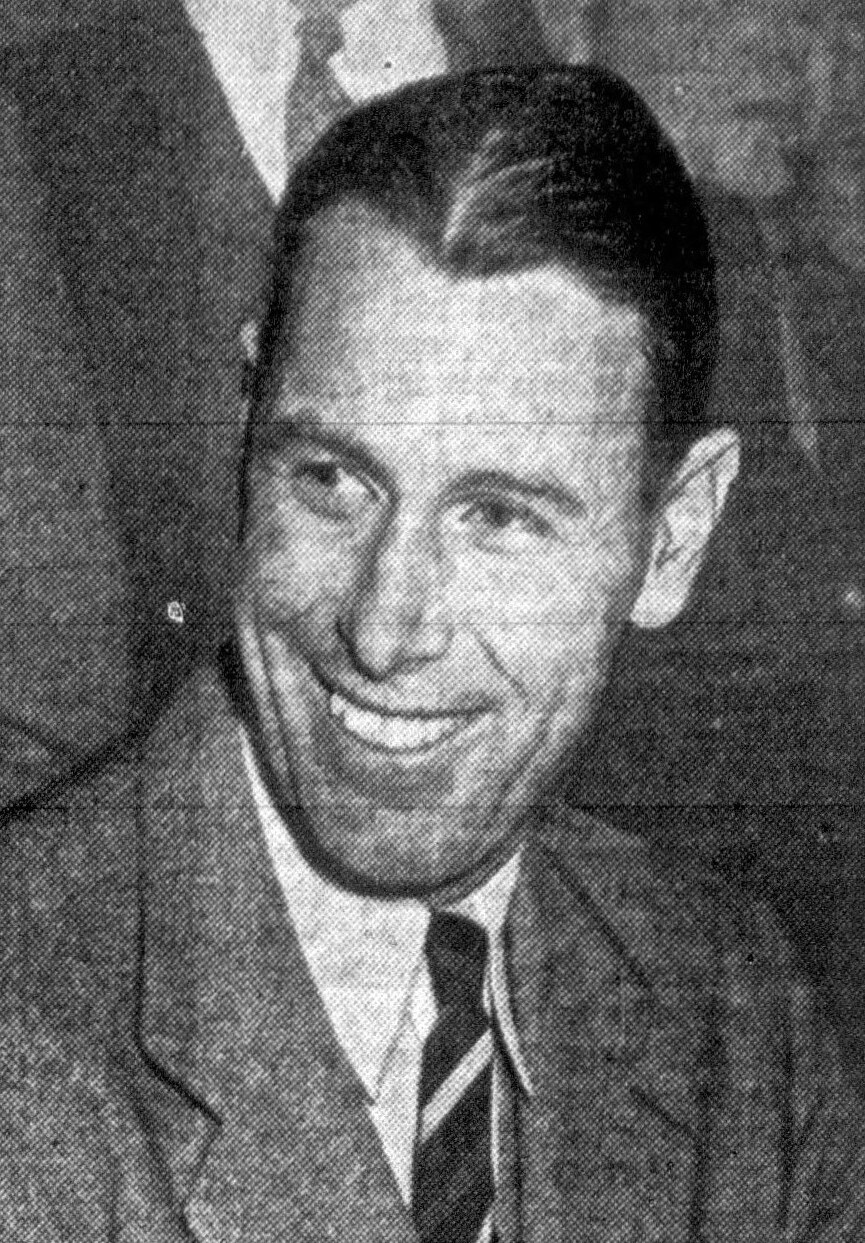
- c. 1942

Biographical details
- Born: September 29, 1902; Jackson, Missouri, U.S.
- Died: June 13, 1992 (aged 89); Beverly Hills, California, U.S.

Playing career
- 1922–1924: California
- Position: Center

Coaching career (HC unless noted)
- 1926–1938: UCLA (assistant)
- 1939–1944: UCLA

Head coaching record
- Overall: 24–31–6
- Bowls: 0–1

Accomplishments and honors

Championships
- PCC (1942)

Awards
- Consensus All-American (1924); 2× First-team All-PCC (1923, 1924)
- College Football Hall of Fame; Inducted in 1969 (profile)

Edwin C. "Babe" Horrell (September 29, 1902 – June 13, 1992) was an American football player and coach. He played college football at the University of California, Berkeley, where he was an All-American in 1924 at center. Horrell served as the head football coach at the University of California, Los Angeles from 1939 to 1944, compiling a record of 24–31–6. In 1942, he led the UCLA Bruins to the Pacific Coast Conference title and an appearance in the Rose Bowl. Horrell was inducted into the College Football Hall of Fame as a player in 1969.

== Playing career ==
Horrell played as center for the California Golden Bears from 1922 to 1924. During those three seasons, the team went 26–0–3 under head coach Andy Smith.

== Coaching career ==
From 1926 to 1938, Horrell was an assistant coach for the UCLA Bruins. He then served as the head coach from 1939 to 1944, compiling a 24–31–6 record. His 1942 UCLA Bruins team lost to Georgia in the 1943 Rose Bowl. He was the first coach to lead a UCLA team to defeat the rival USC Trojans in what became the UCLA–USC rivalry.

== Head coaching record ==
| Year | Team | Overall | Conference | Standing | Bowl/playoffs | AP^{#} |
|---|---|---|---|---|---|---|
UCLA Bruins (Pacific Coast Conference) (1939–1944)
| 1939 | UCLA | 6–0–4 | 5–0–3 | T–2nd | | 7 |
| 1940 | UCLA | 1–9 | 1–6 | 9th | | |
| 1941 | UCLA | 5–5–1 | 3–4–1 | 6th | | |
| 1942 | UCLA | 7–4 | 6–1 | 1st | L Rose | 13 |
| 1943 | UCLA | 1–8 | 0–4 | 3rd | | |
| 1944 | UCLA | 4–5–1 | 1–2–1 | 3rd | | |
| UCLA: | | 24–31–6 | 16–17–5 | | | |
| Total: | | 24–31–6 | | | | |
National championship Conference title Conference division title or championship game berth
^{#}Rankings from final AP Poll.
