= John Eubank (American football) =

American football player and coach (1909–1964)

Biographical details
- Born: Missing required parameter 1=month! 1, 1909; Homestead, Oklahoma, U.S.
- Died: August 29, 1964 (aged 55); Kennewick, Washington, U.S.

Playing career
- 1931–1932: Washington State
- Position: Placekicker

Coaching career (HC unless noted)
- 1942: San Diego State
- 1944: Richland HS (WA)
- c. 1947: Yakima Valley

Administrative career (AD unless noted)
- 1944: Richland HS (WA)

Head coaching record
- Overall: 0–6–1 (college)

John F. Eubank (January 23, 1909 – August 29, 1964) was an American football player and coach. He served as the head football coach at San Diego State University in 1942, compiling a record of 0–6–1. Eubank played college football as Washington State College—now known as Washington State University—where he was nicknamed the "Golden Toe" for his kicking. His 47-yard field goal against UCLA was the nation's longest kick in 1932.

In 1944, he was hired as head football coach and athletic director at Richland High School in Richland, Washington. He later coached at Yakima Valley Junior College in Yakima, Washington.

Eubank ran for United States Congress in 1948, winning the Democratic Party nomination for Washington's 4th congressional district race before losing to incumbent Hal Holmes in the general election. Eubank died on August 29, 1964, of a heart attack, at Kennewick General Hospital in Kennewick, Washington.

== Head coaching record ==
=== College ===
Year	Team	Overall	Conference	Standing	Bowl/playoffs
San Diego State Aztecs (Independent) (1942)
1942	San Diego State	0–6–1			
San Diego State:		0–6–1			
Total:		0–6–1			
