= 1942 Saint Mary's Gaels football team =

American college football season

1942 Saint Mary's Gaels football
- Conference: Independent
- Record: 6–3–1
- Head coach: James Phelan (1st season)
- Home stadium: Kezar Stadium; Emeryville Ball Park

1942 Western college football independents records
	Conf.			Overall
Team	W	L	T	W		L		T
Fresno State		–		9	–	1	–	0
San Jose State		–		7	–	2	–	0
No. 17 Santa Clara		–		7	–	2	–	0
Portland		–		5	–	2	–	0
Idaho Southern Branch		–		4	–	2	–	0
Saint Mary's		–		6	–	3	–	1
San Francisco		–		6	–	4	–	0
Loyola (CA)		–		5	–	4	–	1
Nevada		–		4	–	3	–	1
Cal Poly		–		4	–	3	–	0
San Diego State		–		0	–	6	–	1
San Francisco State		–		0	–	6	–	0
Rankings from AP Poll

The 1942 Saint Mary's Gaels football team was an American football team that represented Saint Mary's College of California during the 1942 college football season. In their first season under head coach James Phelan, the Gaels compiled a 6–3–1 record and outscored their opponents by a combined total of 135 to 46.

Halfbacks Joe Verutti and John Podesto led the 1942 Gaels on offense.

Saint Mary's was ranked at No. 67 (out of 590 college and military teams) in the final rankings under the Litkenhous Difference by Score System for 1942.

== Schedule ==
Date	Opponent	Site	Result	Attendance	Source
September 26	at California	California Memorial Stadium; Berkeley, CA	L 0–6	35,000	
October 11	Nevada	Emeryville Ball Park; Oakland, CA	W 20–6	6,000	
October 18	vs. San Francisco	Kezar Stadium; San Francisco, CA	W 27–0	35,000	
October 25	at Loyola (CA)	Gilmore Stadium; Los Angeles, CA	W 13–0	18,000	
October 31	at Fordham	Polo Grounds; New York, NY	L 0–7	25,300	
November 7	at Duquesne	Forbes Field; Pittsburgh, PA	T 7–7	13,995	
November 14	vs. Santa Clara	Kezar Stadium; San Francisco, CA	L 7–20	36,000	
November 22	Mather Field	Sacramento Junior College Stadium; Sacramento, CA	W 33–0	7,000	
November 29	vs. Alameda Coast Guard	Kezar Stadium; San Francisco, CA	W 26–0	2,000	
December 6	Detroit	Kezar Stadium; San Francisco, CA	W 2–0	500	
