= Bernie Bradley =

American football and basketball coach (1909–1986)

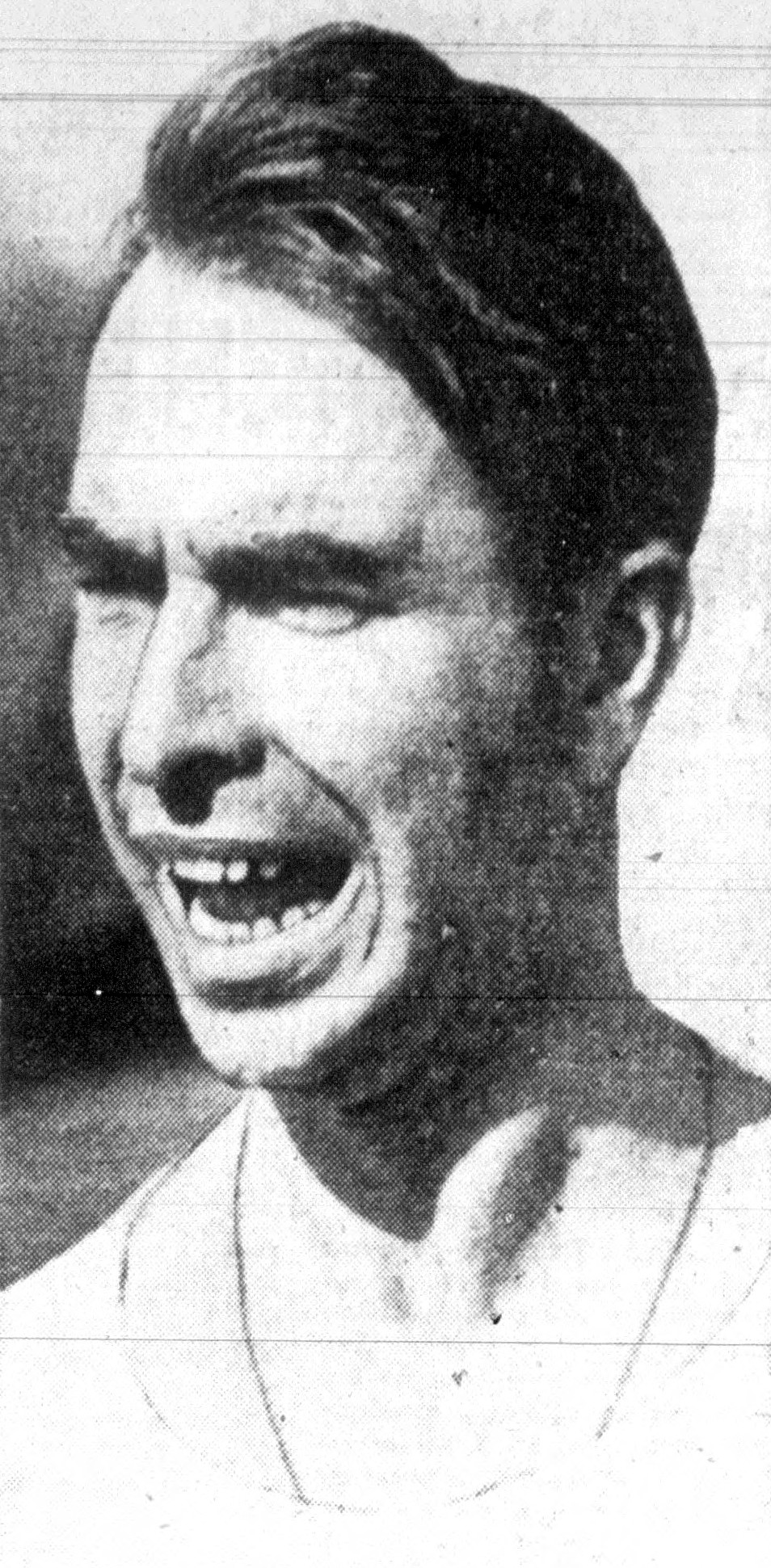
- Bradley, circa 1942

Biographical details
- Born: September 9, 1909
- Died: July 24, 1986 (aged 76); Philadelphia, Pennsylvania, U.S.

Playing career

Football
- 1933–1934: La Salle
- Position: Guard

Coaching career (HC unless noted)

Football
- 1935–1937: La Salle HS (PA)
- ?–1939: La Salle (assistant)
- 1940–1941: Loyola (CA) (line)
- 1942: Loyola (CA)
- 1943–1948: La Salle HS (PA)
- 1949: Villanova (line)
- 1950: Villanova (freshman)

Basketball
- 1940–1942: Loyola (CA)

Head coaching record
- Overall: 5–4–1 (college football); 27–16 (college basketball)

Bernard A. Bradley (September 9, 1909 – July 24, 1986) was an American football and basketball coach. He served as the head football coach at Loyola Marymount University in 1942.

== Early life ==
Bradley attended La Salle University in Philadelphia, Pennsylvania, where he played on the football team as a guard under Marty Brill from 1933 to 1934. In 1934, he served as team captain on La Salle's undefeated squad. Bradley graduated from La Salle in 1935.

== Coaching career ==
After college, Bradley served as the head coach at La Salle High School in Philadelphia through 1937. In 1939, he served as an assistant coach at his alma mater, and in April of the following year, he was hired by his former college coach at Loyola Marymount. He worked as the line coach and scout for two seasons. In August 1942, Bradley was promoted to replace Brill as the head coach at Loyola. He led Loyola to a 5–4–1 record.

In March 1943, Bradley resigned his post at Loyola to return as head coach at La Salle High School. In 1949, he joined the coaching staff at Villanova as a line coach. In 1950, he worked as the freshman coach and as a scout for the varsity team.

In his later life, he lived in the Holmesburg neighborhood of Northeast Philadelphia. Bradley died at the Nazareth Hospital on July 24, 1986, at the age of 76.

== Head coaching record ==
=== College football ===
Year	Team	Overall	Conference	Standing	Bowl/playoffs
Loyola Lions (Independent) (1942)
1942	Loyola	5–4–1			
Loyola:		5–4–1			
Total:		5–4–1			

=== College basketball ===
Record table
Season	Team	Overall	Conference	Standing	Postseason
Loyola Lions (Independent) (1940–1942)
1940–41	Loyola	12–7			
1941–42	Loyola	15–9			
Loyola:		27–16			
Total:		27–16			
