= 1942 California Golden Bears football team =

American college football season

1942 California Golden Bears football
- Conference: Pacific Coast Conference
- Record: 5–5 (3–4 PCC)
- Head coach: Stub Allison (8th season)
- Home stadium: California Memorial Stadium

1942 Pacific Coast Conference football standings
	Conf.					Overall
Team	W		L		T	W		L		T
No. 13 UCLA $	6	–	1	–	0	7	–	4	–	0
Washington State	5	–	1	–	1	6	–	2	–	2
No. 12 Stanford	5	–	2	–	0	6	–	4	–	0
USC	4	–	2	–	1	5	–	5	–	1
Oregon State	4	–	4	–	0	4	–	5	–	1
Washington	3	–	3	–	2	4	–	3	–	3
California	3	–	4	–	0	5	–	5	–	0
Oregon	2	–	5	–	0	2	–	6	–	0
Idaho	1	–	5	–	0	3	–	7	–	0
Montana	0	–	6	–	0	0	–	8	–	0
$ – Conference champion; Rankings from AP Poll

The 1942 California Golden Bears football team was an American football team that represented the University of California, Berkeley during the 1942 college football season. Under head coach Stub Allison, the team compiled an overall record of 5–5 and 3–4 in conference.

Cal was ranked at No. 69 (out of 590 college and military teams) in the final rankings under the Litkenhous Difference by Score System for 1942.

== Schedule ==
Date	Opponent	Site	Result	Attendance	Source
September 26	Saint Mary's*	California Memorial Stadium; Berkeley, CA	W 6–0	35,000	
October 3	at Oregon State	Bell Field; Corvallis, OR	L 8–13	12,000	
October 10	Santa Clara*	California Memorial Stadium; Berkeley, CA	L 6–7	30,000	
October 17	UCLA	California Memorial Stadium; Berkeley, CA (rivalry)	L 0–21	35,000	
October 24	at Washington	Husky Stadium; Seattle, WA	W 19–6	31,000	
October 31	Oregon	California Memorial Stadium; Berkeley, CA	W 20–7	30,000	
November 7	at USC	Los Angeles Memorial Coliseum; Los Angeles, CA	L 7–21	50,000	
November 14	Montana	California Memorial Stadium; Berkeley, CA	W 13–0		
November 21	Stanford	California Memorial Stadium; Berkeley, CA (Big Game)	L 7–26	45,000	
December 5	St. Mary's Pre-Flight*	California Memorial Stadium; Berkeley, CA	W 12–6	20,000	
*Non-conference game
