= List of UConn Huskies football seasons =

The UConn Huskies football college football team competes as part of the National Collegiate Athletic Association (NCAA) Division I Football Bowl Subdivision, representing the University of Connecticut as an Independent. The Huskies have played their home games at Rentschler Field in East Hartford, Connecticut since 2003. From 1953 through 2002, the team played home games at Memorial Stadium on-campus in Storrs, Connecticut. The Huskies have recorded 26 conference championships, and have played in 8 Bowl Games, winning 4. Connecticut made one appearance in the Division I-AA (now FCS) playoffs, in 1998.

== Seasons ==
National champions †	Conference champions *	Division champions ‡	Postseason berth ^

Season	Head coach	Conference	Season results				Postseason result	Peak ranking	
Season	Head coach	Conference	Conf. finish	W	L	T	Postseason result	AP	Coaches
Connecticut Huskies football seasons
1896	None	Independent	—	5	3	0	—	—	—
1897	None	Athletic League of New England State Colleges	—	5	2	0	—	—	—
1898	E. S. Mansfield	Athletic League of New England State Colleges	—	0	3	0	—	—	—
1899	T. D. Knowles	Athletic League of New England State Colleges	—	6	2	0	—	—	—
1900	T. D. Knowles	Athletic League of New England State Colleges	—	4	3	1	—	—	—
1901*	T. D. Knowles	Athletic League of New England State Colleges	1st*	8	2	0	—	—	—
1902	Edwin O. Smith	Athletic League of New England State Colleges	—	4	3	0	—	—	—
1903	Edwin O. Smith	Athletic League of New England State Colleges	—	3	5	0	—	—	—
1904	Edwin O. Smith	Athletic League of New England State Colleges	—	5	3	1	—	—	—
1905	Edwin O. Smith	Athletic League of New England State Colleges	—	2	2	0	—	—	—
1906	George H. Lamson	Athletic League of New England State Colleges	—	2	4	0	—	—	—
1907	George H. Lamson	Athletic League of New England State Colleges	—	2	5	0	—	—	—
1908	W. F. Madden	Athletic League of New England State Colleges	—	4	3	1	—	—	—
1909	S. F. G. McLean	Athletic League of New England State Colleges	—	3	5	0	—	—	—
1910	M. F. Claffey	Athletic League of New England State Colleges	—	1	5	1	—	—	—
1911	Leo Hafford	Athletic League of New England State Colleges	—	0	5	0	—	—	—
1912	A. J. Sharadin	Athletic League of New England State Colleges	—	3	3	0	—	—	—
1913	P. T. Brady	Athletic League of New England State Colleges	—	5	3	0	—	—	—
1914	Dave Warner	Athletic League of New England State Colleges	—	3	0	0	—	—	—
1915	John F. Donahue	Athletic League of New England State Colleges	—	1	7	0	—	—	—
1916	John F. Donahue	Athletic League of New England State Colleges	—	1	7	0	—	—	—
1917	No team								
1918	No team								
1919	Roy J. Guyer	Athletic League of New England State Colleges	—	2	6	0	—	—	—
1920	Ross Swartz	Athletic League of New England State Colleges	—	1	6	1	—	—	—
1921	J. Wilder Tasker	Athletic League of New England State Colleges	—	3	2	3	—	—	—
1922	J. Wilder Tasker	Athletic League of New England State Colleges	—	2	6	1	—	—	—
1923	Sumner Dole	New England Conference	2nd	3	4	1	—	—	—
1924*	Sumner Dole	New England Conference	1st*	6	0	2	—	—	—
1925	Sumner Dole	New England Conference	5th	3	5	1	—	—	—
1926*	Sumner Dole	New England Conference	1st*	7	1	0	—	—	—
1927	Sumner Dole	New England Conference	3rd	5	4	0	—	—	—
1928*	Sumner Dole	New England Conference	T-1st*	4	1	3	—	—	—
1929	Sumner Dole	New England Conference	T-3rd	4	4	0	—	—	—
1930	Sumner Dole	New England Conference	4th	1	5	1	—	—	—
1931	Sumner Dole	New England Conference	4th	2	3	3	—	—	—
1932	Sumner Dole	New England Conference	4th	0	6	2	—	—	—
1933	Sumner Dole	New England Conference	3rd	1	6	1	—	—	—
1934	J. Orlean Christian	New England Conference	3rd	1	7	0	—	—	—
1935	J. Orlean Christian	New England Conference	T-3rd	2	4	1	—	—	—
1936*	J. Orlean Christian	New England Conference	1st*	7	2	0	—	—	—
1937*	J. Orlean Christian	New England Conference	T-1st*	6	2	1	—	—	—
1938	J. Orlean Christian	New England Conference	5th	4	3	0	—	—	—
1939	J. Orlean Christian	New England Conference	2nd	5	3	0	—	—	—
1940	J. Orlean Christian	New England Conference	3rd	4	4	0	—	—	—
1941	J. Orlean Christian	New England Conference	5th	2	6	0	—	—	—
1942*	J. Orlean Christian	New England Conference	T-1st*	6	2	0	—	—	—
1943	No team								
1944	J. Orlean Christian	New England Conference	3rd	7	1	0	—	—	—
1945*	J. Orlean Christian	New England Conference	T-1st*	7	1	0	—	—	—
1946*	J. Orlean Christian	New England Conference	T-1st*	4	3	1	—	—	—
1947	J. Orlean Christian	Yankee Conference	3rd	4	4	0	—	—	—
1948	J. Orlean Christian	Yankee Conference	2nd	3	5	0	—	—	—
1949*	J. Orlean Christian	Yankee Conference	T-1st*	4	4	1	—	—	—
1950	Arthur Valpey	Yankee Conference	T-5th	3	5	0	—	—	—
1951	Arthur Valpey	Yankee Conference	3rd	4	4	0	—	—	—
1952*	Robert Ingalls	Yankee Conference	T-1st*	5	3	0	—	—	—
1953	Robert Ingalls	Yankee Conference	3rd	3	4	1	—	—	—
1954	Robert Ingalls	Yankee Conference	6th	1	8	0	—	—	—
1955	Robert Ingalls	Yankee Conference	3rd	4	4	0	—	—	—
1956*	Robert Ingalls	Yankee Conference	1st*	6	2	1	—	—	—
1957*	Robert Ingalls	Yankee Conference	T-1st*	5	4	1	—	—	—
1958*	Robert Ingalls	Yankee Conference	1st*	7	3	0	—	—	—
1959*	Robert Ingalls	Yankee Conference	1st*	6	3	0	—	—	—
1960*	Robert Ingalls	Yankee Conference	T-1st*	5	4	0	—	—	—
1961	Robert Ingalls	Yankee Conference	3rd	2	7	0	—	—	—
1962	Robert Ingalls	Yankee Conference	3rd	3	6	0	—	—	—
1963	Robert Ingalls	Yankee Conference	5th	2	6	0	—	—	—
1964	Rick Forzano	Yankee Conference	3rd	4	4	1	—	—	—
1965	Rick Forzano	Yankee Conference	T-3rd	3	6	0	—	—	—
1966	John Toner	Yankee Conference	3rd	2	6	1	—	—	—
1967	John Toner	Yankee Conference	2nd	5	4	0	—	—	—
1968*	John Toner	Yankee Conference	T-1st*	4	6	0	—	—	—
1969	John Toner	Yankee Conference	T-2nd	5	4	0	—	—	—
1970*	John Toner	Yankee Conference	1st*	4	4	2	—	—	—
1971*	Robert Casciola	Yankee Conference	T-1st*	5	3	1	—	—	—
1972	Robert Casciola	Yankee Conference	2nd	4	5	0	—	—	—
1973*	Larry Naviaux	Yankee Conference	1st*	8	2	1	—	—	—
1974	Larry Naviaux	Yankee Conference	T-3rd	4	6	0	—	—	—
1975	Larry Naviaux	Yankee Conference	3rd	4	7	0	—	—	—
1976	Larry Naviaux	Yankee Conference	T-3rd	2	9	0	—	—	—
1977	Walt Nadzak	Yankee Conference	T-4th	1	10	0	—	—	—
1978	Walt Nadzak	Yankee Conference	2nd	4	7	0	—	—	—
1979	Walt Nadzak	Yankee Conference	3rd	3	6	2	—	—	—
1980	Walt Nadzak	Yankee Conference	3rd	7	3	0	—	—	—
1981	Walt Nadzak	Yankee Conference	5th	4	7	0	—	—	—
1982*	Walt Nadzak	Yankee Conference	T-1st*	5	6	0	—	—	—
1983*	Tom Jackson	Yankee Conference	T-1st*	5	6	0	—	—	—
1984	Tom Jackson	Yankee Conference	5th	3	8	0	—	—	—
1985	Tom Jackson	Yankee Conference	5th	4	5	0	—	—	—
1986*	Tom Jackson	Yankee Conference	T-1st*	8	3	0	—	—	—
1987	Tom Jackson	Yankee Conference	3rd	7	4	0	—	—	—
1988	Tom Jackson	Yankee Conference	3rd	7	4	0	—	—	—
1989*	Tom Jackson	Yankee Conference	T-1st*	8	3	0	—	—	—
1990	Tom Jackson	Yankee Conference	4th	6	5	0	—	—	—
1991	Tom Jackson	Yankee Conference	8th	3	8	0	—	—	—
1992	Tom Jackson	Yankee Conference	6th	5	6	0	—	—	—
1993	Tom Jackson	Yankee Conference	3rd (New England)	6	5	0	—	—	—
1994	Skip Holtz	Yankee Conference	3rd (New England)	4	7	0	—	—	—
1995	Skip Holtz	Yankee Conference	2nd (New England)	8	3	0	—	—	—
1996	Skip Holtz	Yankee Conference	4th (New England)	5	6		—	—	—
1997	Skip Holtz	Atlantic 10 Conference	2nd (New England)	7	4		—	—	—
1998‡	Skip Holtz	Atlantic 10 Conference	1st (New England)‡	10	3		Won Division I-AA Playoffs First Round against Hampton 42–34 Lost Quarterfinals against Georgia Southern 30–52	—	—
1999	Randy Edsall	Atlantic 10 Conference	6th	4	7		—	—	—
2000	Randy Edsall	Independent	—	3	8		—	—	—
2001	Randy Edsall	Independent	—	2	9		—	—	—
2002	Randy Edsall	Independent	—	6	6		—	—	—
2003	Randy Edsall	Independent	—	9	3		—	—	—
2004^	Randy Edsall	Big East Conference	5th	8	4		Won Motor City Bowl against Toledo 39–10	—	—
2005	Randy Edsall	Big East Conference	7th	5	6		—	—	—
2006	Randy Edsall	Big East Conference	7th	4	8		—	—	—
2007*^	Randy Edsall	Big East Conference	T-1st*	9	4		Lost Meineke Car Care Bowl against Wake Forest 10–24	16	—
2008^	Randy Edsall	Big East Conference	5th	8	5		Won International Bowl against Buffalo 38–20	24	—
2009^	Randy Edsall	Big East Conference	5th	8	5		Won PapaJohns.com Bowl against South Carolina 20–7	—	—
2010*^	Randy Edsall	Big East Conference	T-1st*	8	5		Lost Fiesta Bowl against Oklahoma 20–48	25	—
2011	Paul Pasqualoni	Big East Conference	6th	5	7		—	—	—
2012	Paul Pasqualoni	Big East Conference	6th	5	7		—	—	—
2013	Paul Pasqualoni/T. J. Weist (Note: Paul Pasqualoni was fired after five games during the 2013 season, and was replaced by interim head coach T. J. Weist for the remainder of the season.)	American Athletic Conference	7th	3	9		—	—	—
2014	Bob Diaco	American Athletic Conference	10th	2	10		—	—	—
2015^	Bob Diaco	American Athletic Conference	T–3rd (East)	6	7		Lost St. Petersburg Bowl against Marshall 10–16	—	—
2016	Bob Diaco	American Athletic Conference	T–4th (East)	3	9		—	—	—
2017	Randy Edsall	American Athletic Conference	T–4th (East)	3	9		—	—	—
2018	Randy Edsall	American Athletic Conference	6th (East)	1	11		—	—	—
2019	Randy Edsall	American Athletic Conference	6th (East)	2	10		—	—	—
2020	Season cancelled due to COVID-19 pandemic								
2021	Randy Edsall/Lou Spanos (Note: Randy Edsall retired after two games during the 2021 season, and defensive coordinator Lou Spanos was named interim head for the remainder of the season.)	Independent	—	1	11		—	—	—
2022^	Jim L. Mora	Independent	—	6	7		Lost Myrtle Beach Bowl against Marshall 14–28	—	—
2023	Jim L. Mora	Independent	—	3	9		—	—	—
2024^	Jim L. Mora	Independent	—	9	4		Won Fenway Bowl against North Carolina 27–14	—	—
2025^	Jim L. Mora	Independent	—	9	4		Lost Fenway Bowl against Army 16–41	—	—
Totals				525	608	38	All-time regular season record (1896-2025)		
Totals				5	6		All-time bowl game & postseason record (1896–2025)		
Totals				530	613	38	All-time record (1896-2024)		
