= List of Rhode Island Rams football seasons =

The following is a list of Rhode Island Rams football seasons.

This is a list of seasons completed by the Rhode Island Rams football team of the National Collegiate Athletic Association (NCAA) Division I Football Championship Subdivision (FCS).

== Seasons ==
National champions	Conference champions	Bowl game berth	Playoff berth

Season	Year	Head coach	Association	Division	Conference	Record							Postseason	Final ranking
Season	Year	Head coach	Association	Division	Conference	Overall			Conference				Postseason	Final ranking
Season	Year	Head coach	Association	Division	Conference	Win	Loss	Tie	Finish	Win	Loss	Tie	Postseason	Final ranking
Rhode Island Rams
1895	1895	No coach	—	—	—	1	1	0					—	—
1896	1896	No coach	—	—	—	0	4	0					—	—
1897	1897	No coach	—	—	—	1	2	0					—	—
1899	1898	Marshall Tyler	—	—	—	5	0	0					—	—
1899	1899	Marshall Tyler	—	—	—	2	3	1					—	—
1900	1900	Marshall Tyler	—	—	—	0	1	2					—	—
1901	1901	Marshall Tyler	—	—	—	0	2	0					—	—
No team in 1902
1903	1903	Marshall Tyler	—	—	—	2	4	1					—	—
1904	1904	Marshall Tyler	—	—	—	3	3	1					—	—
1905	1905	Marshall Tyler	—	—	—	3	3	1					—	—
1906	1906	Marshall Tyler	IAAUS	—	—	1	2	1					—	—
Rhode Island State Rams
1907	1907	Marshall Tyler	IAAUS	—	—	3	1	2					—	—
1908	1908	Marshall Tyler	IAAUS	—	—	4	2	0					—	—
1909	1909	George Cobb	NCAA	—	—	3	4	0					—	—
1910	1910	George Cobb	NCAA	—	—	5	1	1					—	—
1911	1911	George Cobb	NCAA	—	—	5	2	1					—	—
1912	1912	Robert Bingham	NCAA	—	—	6	3	0					—	—
1913	1913	George Cobb	NCAA	—	—	2	6	0					—	—
1914	1914	George Cobb	NCAA	—	—	2	3	3					—	—
1915	1915	James A. Baldwin	NCAA	—	—	3	5	0					—	—
1916	1916	James A. Baldwin	NCAA	—	—	3	4	1					—	—
1917	1917	Fred Murray	NCAA	—	—	2	4	2					—	—
No team in 1918
1919	1919	Fred Murray	NCAA	—	—	0	7	1					—	—
1920	1920	Frank Keaney	NCAA	—	—	0	4	4					—	—
1921	1921	Frank Keaney	NCAA	—	—	3	5	0					—	—
1922	1922	Frank Keaney	NCAA	—	—	4	4	0					—	—
1923	1923	Frank Keaney	NCAA	—	—	1	5	1					—	—
1924	1924	Frank Keaney	NCAA	—	—	0	7	0					—	—
1925	1925	Frank Keaney	NCAA	—	—	2	5	1					—	—
1926	1926	Frank Keaney	NCAA	—	—	1	6	0					—	—
1927	1927	Frank Keaney	NCAA	—	—	5	3	0					—	—
1928	1928	Frank Keaney	NCAA	—	—	2	7	0					—	—
1929	1929	Frank Keaney	NCAA	—	—	5	2	1					—	—
1930	1930	Frank Keaney	NCAA	—	—	5	2	1					—	—
1931	1931	Frank Keaney	NCAA	—	—	4	4	0					—	—
1932	1932	Frank Keaney	NCAA	—	—	2	5	1					—	—
1933	1933	Frank Keaney	NCAA	—	—	6	2	0					—	—
1934	1934	Frank Keaney	NCAA	—	—	6	3	0					—	—
1935	1935	Frank Keaney	NCAA	—	—	4	4	1					—	—
1936	1936	Frank Keaney	NCAA	—	—	5	4	0					—	—
1937	1937	Frank Keaney	NCAA	—	—	3	4	1					—	—
1938	1938	Frank Keaney	NCAA	—	—	4	4	0					—	—
1939	1939	Frank Keaney	NCAA	—	—	3	4	1					—	—
1940	1940	Frank Keaney	NCAA	—	—	5	3	0					—	—
1941	1941	Bill Beck	NCAA	—	—	5	2	1					—	—
1942	1942	Paul Cieurzo	NCAA	—	—	3	3	0					—	—
No team in 1943–1944
1945	1945	Paul Cieurzo	NCAA	—	—	2	1	0					—	—
1946	1946	Bill Beck	NCAA	College Division	—	2	4	0					—	—
1947	1947	Bill Beck	NCAA	College Division	Yankee Conference	3	4	0	4th	1	3	0	—	—
1948	1948	Bill Beck	NCAA	College Division	Yankee Conference	2	4	1	4th	1	3	0	—	—
1949	1949	Bill Beck	NCAA	College Division	Yankee Conference	0	8	0	4th	0	4	0	—	—
1950	1950	Hal Kopp	NCAA	College Division	Yankee Conference	3	5	0	3rd	2	3	0	—	—
Rhode Island Rams
1951	1951	Ed Doherty	NCAA	College Division	Yankee Conference	3	5	0	4th	1	3	0	—	—
1952	1952	Hal Kopp	NCAA	College Division	Yankee Conference	7	1	0	т1st	3	1	0	Conference Champion	—
1953	1953	Hal Kopp	NCAA	College Division	Yankee Conference	6	2	0					—	—
1954	1954	Hal Kopp	NCAA	College Division	Yankee Conference	6	2	0	2nd	3	1	0	—	—
1955	1955	Hal Kopp	NCAA	College Division	Yankee Conference	6	1	2	1st	4	0	1	Lost 1955 Refrigerator Bowl 10–12	—
1956	1956	Herb Maack	NCAA	College Division	Yankee Conference	2	6	0	6th	1	4	0	—	—
1957	1957	Herb Maack	NCAA	College Division	Yankee Conference	5	2	1	т1st	3	0	1	Conference Champion	—
1958	1958	Herb Maack	NCAA	College Division	Yankee Conference	4	4	0	3rd	2	2	0	—	—
1959	1959	Herb Maack	NCAA	College Division	Yankee Conference	3	5	1	т4th	1	1	1	—	—
1960	1960	Herb Maack	NCAA	College Division	Yankee Conference	3	5	0	5th	1	4	0	—	—
1961	1961	John Chironna	NCAA	College Division	Yankee Conference	2	6	1	5th	1	4	0	—	—
1962	1962	John Chironna	NCAA	College Division	Yankee Conference	2	5	2	т4th	1	3	0	—	—
1963	1963	Jack Zilly	NCAA	College Division	Yankee Conference	4	5	0	4th	2	3	0	—	—
1964	1964	Jack Zilly	NCAA	College Division	Yankee Conference	3	7	0	5th	1	4	0	—	—
1965	1965	Jack Zilly	NCAA	College Division	Yankee Conference	2	7	0	5th	1	4	0	—	—
1966	1966	Jack Zilly	NCAA	College Division	Yankee Conference	1	7	1	5th	1	3	1	—	—
1967	1967	Jack Zilly	NCAA	College Division	Yankee Conference	6	2	1	2nd	2	2	1	—	—
1968	1968	Jack Zilly	NCAA	College Division	Yankee Conference	3	6	0	т3rd	2	3	0	—	—
1969	1969	Jack Zilly	NCAA	College Division	Yankee Conference	2	7	0	т5th	1	4	0	—	—
1970	1970	Jack Gregory	NCAA	College Division	Yankee Conference	3	5	0	т3rd	3	2	0	—	—
1971	1971	Jack Gregory	NCAA	College Division	Yankee Conference	3	6	0	т4th	2	3	0	—	—
1972	1972	Jack Gregory	NCAA	College Division	Yankee Conference	3	7	0	6th	0	5	0	—	—
1973	1973	Jack Gregory	NCAA	Division II	Yankee Conference	6	2	2	2nd	4	1	1	Won Turkey Bowl 34–6	—
1974	1974	Jack Gregory	NCAA	Division II	Yankee Conference	5	5	0	т3rd	3	3	0	—	—
1975	1975	Jack Gregory	NCAA	Division II	Yankee Conference	2	8	0	4th	1	4	0	—	—
1976	1976	Bob Griffin	NCAA	Division II	Yankee Conference	3	5	0	т3rd	2	3	0	—	—
1977	1977	Bob Griffin	NCAA	Division II	Yankee Conference	6	5	0	2nd	4	1	0	—	—
1978	1978	Bob Griffin	NCAA	Division I–AA	Yankee Conference	7	3	0	т2nd	3	2	0	—	10
1979	1979	Bob Griffin	NCAA	Division I–AA	Yankee Conference	1	9	1	5th	1	4	0	—	—
1980	1980	Bob Griffin	NCAA	Division I–AA	Yankee Conference	2	9	0	6th	0	5	0	—	—
1981	1981	Bob Griffin	NCAA	Division I–AA	Yankee Conference	6	6	0	т1st	4	1	0	Lost NCAA Division I–AA First Round 0–51	—
1982	1982	Bob Griffin	NCAA	Division I–AA	Yankee Conference	7	4	0	5th	2	3	0	—	—
1983	1983	Bob Griffin	NCAA	Division I–AA	Yankee Conference	6	4	0	т4th	2	3	0	—	—
1984	1984	Bob Griffin	NCAA	Division I–AA	Yankee Conference	10	3	0	т1st	4	1	0	WonNCAA Division I–AA Quarterfinals 20–32	3
1985	1985	Bob Griffin	NCAA	Division I–AA	Yankee Conference	10	3	0	1st	5	0	0	Won NCAA Division I–AA Quarterfinals 15–59	7
1986	1986	Bob Griffin	NCAA	Division I–AA	Yankee Conference	1	10	0	8th	0	7	0	—	—
1987	1987	Bob Griffin	NCAA	Division I–AA	Yankee Conference	1	10	0	8th	1	6	0	—	—
1988	1988	Bob Griffin	NCAA	Division I–AA	Yankee Conference	4	7	0	т7th	3	5	0	—	—
1989	1989	Bob Griffin	NCAA	Division I–AA	Yankee Conference	3	8	0	8th	1	7	0	—	—
1990	1990	Bob Griffin	NCAA	Division I–AA	Yankee Conference	5	6	0	т7th	2	6	0	—	—
1991	1991	Bob Griffin	NCAA	Division I–AA	Yankee Conference	6	5	0	т4th	3	5	0	—	—
1992	1992	Bob Griffin	NCAA	Division I–AA	Yankee Conference	1	10	0	9th	0	8	0	—	—
1993	1993	Floyd Keith	NCAA	Division I–AA	Yankee Conference	4	7	0	4th	2	6	0	—	—
1994	1994	Floyd Keith	NCAA	Division I–AA	Yankee Conference	2	9	0	т5th	2	6	0	—	—
1995	1995	Floyd Keith	NCAA	Division I–AA	Yankee Conference	7	4	0	1st	6	2	0	Conference Champion	—
1996	1996	Floyd Keith	NCAA	Division I–AA	Yankee Conference	5	6	0	4th	2	5	0	—	—
1997	1997	Floyd Keith	NCAA	Division I–AA	A-10	2	9	0	т4th	2	6	0	—	—
1998	1998	Floyd Keith	NCAA	Division I–AA	A-10	3	8	0	5th	2	6	0	—	—
1999	1999	Floyd Keith	NCAA	Division I–AA	A-10	1	10	0	т10th	1	7	0	—	—
2000	2000	Tim Stowers	NCAA	Division I–AA	A-10	3	8	0	9th	2	7	0	—	—
2001	2001	Tim Stowers	NCAA	Division I–AA	A-10	8	3	0	5th	6	3	0	—	21
2002	2002	Tim Stowers	NCAA	Division I–AA	A-10	3	9	0	11th	1	8	0	—	—
2003	2003	Tim Stowers	NCAA	Division I–AA	A-10	4	8	0	т8th	3	8	0	—	—
2004	2004	Tim Stowers	NCAA	Division I–AA	A-10	4	7	0	6th	2	6	0	—	—
2005	2005	Tim Stowers	NCAA	Division I–AA	A-10	4	7	0	6th	2	6	0	—	—
2006	2006	Tim Stowers	NCAA	Division I FCS	A-10	4	7	0	5th	2	6	0	—	—
2007	2007	Tim Stowers	NCAA	Division I FCS	CAA	3	8	0	т4th	2	7	0	—	—
2008	2008	Darren Rizzi	NCAA	Division I FCS	CAA	3	9	0	т5th	2	7	0	—	—
2009	2009	Joe Trainer	NCAA	Division I FCS	CAA	1	10	0	6th	0	8	0	—	—
2010	2010	Joe Trainer	NCAA	Division I FCS	CAA	5	6	0	т5th	4	4	0	—	—
2011	2011	Joe Trainer	NCAA	Division I FCS	CAA	3	8	0	8th	2	6	0	—	—
2012	2012	Joe Trainer	NCAA	Division I FCS	CAA	0	11	0	13th	0	8	0	—	—
2013	2013	Joe Trainer	NCAA	Division I FCS	CAA	3	9	0	11th	2	6	0	—	—
2014	2014	Jim Fleming	NCAA	Division I FCS	CAA	1	11	0	12th	1	7	0	—	—
2015	2015	Jim Fleming	NCAA	Division I FCS	CAA	1	10	0	13th	1	7	0	—	—
2016	2016	Jim Fleming	NCAA	Division I FCS	CAA	2	9	0	т12th	1	7	0	—	—
2017	2017	Jim Fleming	NCAA	Division I FCS	CAA	3	8	0	т10th	2	6	0	—	—
2018	2018	Jim Fleming	NCAA	Division I FCS	CAA	6	5	0	7th	4	4	0	—	—
2019	2019	Jim Fleming	NCAA	Division I FCS	CAA	2	10	0	12th	0	8	0	—	—
2020	2020	Jim Fleming	NCAA	Division I FCS	CAA	2	1	0	2nd (North)	2	1	0	—	—
2021	2021	Jim Fleming	NCAA	Division I FCS	CAA	7	4	0	т4th	4	4	0	—	—
2022	2022	Jim Fleming	NCAA	Division I FCS	CAA	6	3	0	5th	4	2	0	—	—
2023	2023	Jim Fleming	NCAA	Division I FCS	CAA	6	5	0	т6th	4	4	0	—	—
2024	2024	Jim Fleming	NCAA	Division I FCS	CAA	11	3	0	2nd	7	1	0	Lost NCAA Division I FCS Second Round	#9/#11
2025	2025	Jim Fleming	NCAA	Division I FCS	CAA	11	3	0	1st	8	0	0	Lost NCAA Division I FCS Second Round	#11/#10
