= List of UConn Huskies head football coaches =

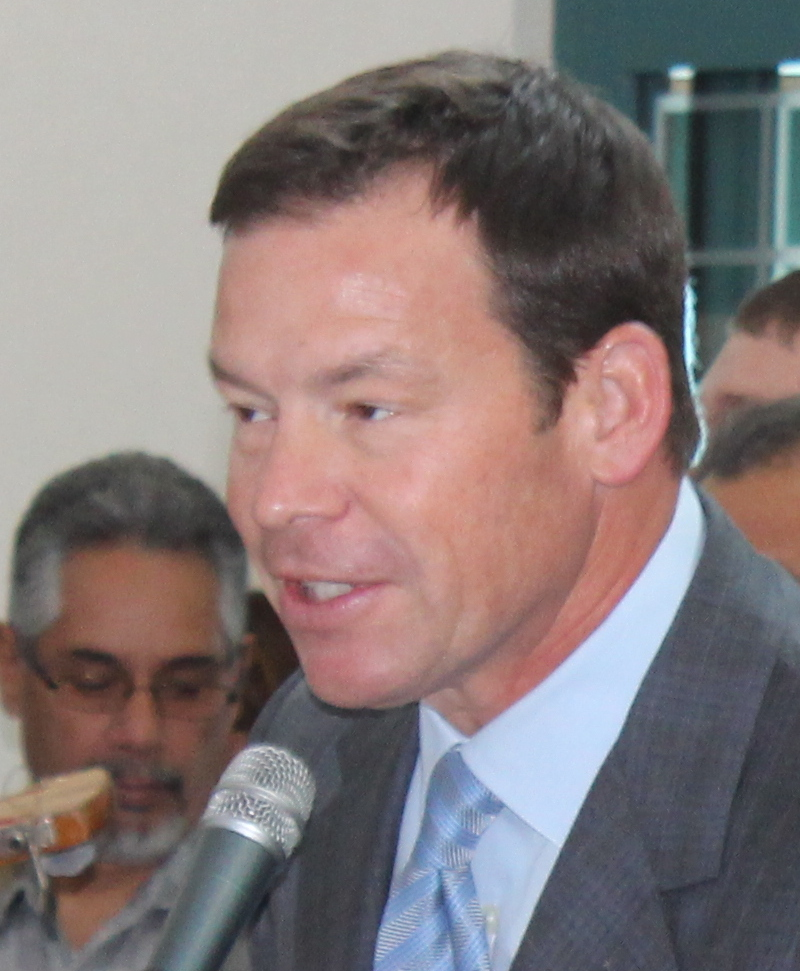
Jim Mora served as head coach 2022-2025.

The UConn Huskies football team has represented the University of Connecticut in National Collegiate Athletic Association (NCAA) football since the team's founding in 1896. The program has had 32 head coaches, including three interim coaches and an early period when the team had no head coach. The current coach is Jason Candle, who came over to UConn after 10 seasons at Toledo.

The nickname "Huskies" was adopted following a student poll in The Connecticut Campus in 1934 after the school's name changed from Connecticut Agricultural College to Connecticut State College in 1933; before then, the teams were referred to as the Aggies. Although the school's abbreviated nickname "UConn" and the Canadian Yukon territory—where huskies are commonly used in dogsledding—are homophones, the "Huskies" nickname predates the school's 1939 name change to the University of Connecticut. The first recorded use of "UConn" (as "U-Conn", both separately and with "Huskies") was later in 1939.

The Huskies have played 1,194 games during the program's 128 seasons through 2025. UConn joined the fledgling Yankee Conference in 1947, which merged with and became the Atlantic 10 football conference in 1997. Seven coaches—J. Orlean Christian, Robert Ingalls, John Toner, Robert Casciola, Larry Naviaux, Walt Nadzak, and Tom Jackson—led Connecticut to conference championships prior to the team's transition from Division I-AA to Division I-A in 2000, (Note: In August 2006 the NCAA changed the name of Division I-A to Football Bowl Subdivision (FBS) and Division I-AA to Football Championship Subdivision (FCS). In this article the old names are used to refer to events that occurred prior to August 2006.) and one coach—Skip Holtz—led UConn to the Division I-AA playoffs in 1998. Following the transition, Edsall led the Huskies to Big East Conference (Note: The American Athletic Conference operated as the Big East Conference from 1979 through 2013. See 2010–13 Big East Conference realignment for more information. This article uses the name "Big East" to refer to the conference for the years 2013 and earlier.) championships in 2007 and 2010.

Randy Edsall is Connecticut's all-time leader in games coached (144), coaching wins (74), bowl game appearances (5), and bowl game wins (3).^{[General]} Bob Diaco is the only other UConn head coach to lead the team to a bowl game, which was lost. Dave Warner, who led the then-Aggies to a 3–0 record in his only season coached in 1914, is the all-time leader in winning percentage (1.000); E. S. Mansfield and Leo Hafford, who both lost every game they coached in 1898 and 1911, (Note: According to one source, Hafford died on October 1, 1911, one day after Connecticut's first game of the 1911 season. The official university record book credits him with four losses in games played after that date, however.^{[General]}) respectively, share the lowest-ever winning percentage (.000). Among coaches that led the team for longer than a single season, T. D. Knowles is the all-time leader in winning percentage (.712), while John F. Donahue has the all-time lowest winning percentage (.125).

== Key ==
Key to symbols in coaches list
General		Overall		Conference		Postseason (Note: Although the first Rose Bowl Game was played in 1902, it has been continuously played since the 1916 game, and is recognized as the oldest bowl game by the NCAA. "—" indicates any season prior to 1916 when postseason games were not played.)	
No.	Order of coaches (Note: A running total of the number of head coaches, with coaches who served separate tenures being counted only once. Interim head coaches are represented with "Int" and are not counted in the running total. "—" indicates the team played but either without a coach or no coach is on record. "X" indicates an interim year without play.)	GC	Games coached	CW	Conference wins	PW	Postseason wins
DC	Division championships	OW	Overall wins	CL	Conference losses	PL	Postseason losses
CC	Conference championships	OL	Overall losses	CT	Conference ties	PT	Postseason ties
NC	National championships	OT	Overall ties (Note: Overtime rules in college football were introduced in 1996, making ties impossible in the period since.)	C%	Conference winning percentage		
†	Elected to the College Football Hall of Fame	O%	Overall winning percentage (Note: When computing the win–loss percentage, a tie counts as half a win and half a loss.)				

== Coaches ==
List of head football coaches showing season(s) coached, overall records, conference records, (Note: The University of Connecticut does not record conference records until 1947, the first season of the Yankee Conference. UConn was not a member of a conference for football from 2000–03.^{[General]}) postseason records, division (Note: Connecticut participated in divisional play for seven seasons in the Division I-AA era, between the expansion of the Yankee Conference to twelve teams and two divisions in 1993 and the beginning of UConn's transition to Division I-A in 2000.^{[General]} The American Athletic Conference began divisional play in 2015 following the addition of the Navy Midshipmen, which brought the total number of teams in the conference to twelve.) and conference (Note: Conference championships include both sole and shared championships for all years between 1947–99 and 2004–14, where UConn played in conferences with no championship game.^{[General]}) championships, and selected awards (Note: Selected awards include only those associated with the coach's time at the University of Connecticut.) (Note: Statistics are correct as of the end of the 2024 NCAA Division I FBS football season.)
			Overall					Conference				Postseason					
No.	Name	Season(s)	GC	OW	OL	OT	O%	CW	CL	CT	C%	PW	PL	PT	DC	CC	Awards
—	No coach	1896–97	15	10	5	0	.667	—	—	—	—	—	—	—	—	—	—
1	E. S. Mansfield	1898	3	0	3	0	.000	—	—	—	—	—	—	—	—	—	—
2	T. D. Knowles	1899–1901	26	18	7	1	.712	—	—	—	—	—	—	—	—	—	—
3	Edwin O. Smith	1902–05	28	14	13	1	.518	—	—	—	—	—	—	—	—	—	—
4	George H. Lamson	1906–07	13	4	9	0	.308	—	—	—	—	—	—	—	—	—	—
5	William F. Madden	1908	8	4	3	1	.563	—	—	—	—	—	—	—	—	—	—
6	S. Frank G. McLean	1909	8	3	5	0	.375	—	—	—	—	—	—	—	—	—	—
7	M. F. Claffey	1910	7	1	5	1	.214	—	—	—	—	—	—	—	—	—	—
8	Leo Hafford	1911	5	0	5	0	.000	—	—	—	—	—	—	—	—	—	—
9	Abraham J. Sharadin	1912	6	3	3	0	.500	—	—	—	—	—	—	—	—	—	—
10	P. T. Brady	1913	8	5	3	0	.625	—	—	—	—	—	—	—	—	—	—
11	Dave Warner	1914	3	3	0	0	1.000	—	—	—	—	—	—	—	—	—	—
12	John F. Donahue	1915–16	16	2	14	0	.125	—	—	—	—	—	—	—	—	—	—
X	No football played	1917–18 (Note: No football games were played in 1917 nor 1918 due to World War I.^{[General]})	—	—	—	—	—	—	—	—	—	—	—	—	—	—	—
13	Roy J. Guyer	1919	8	2	6	0	.250	—	—	—	—	0	0	0	—	—	—
14	Ross Swartz	1920	8	1	6	1	.188	—	—	—	—	0	0	0	—	—	—
15	J. Wilder Tasker	1921–22	17	5	8	4	.412	—	—	—	—	0	0	0	—	—	—
16	Sumner Dole	1923–33	89	36	39	14	.483	—	—	—	—	0	0	0	—	—	—
17	J. Orlean Christian	1934–49 (Note: No football games were played in 1943 due to World War II.^{[General]})	121	66	51	4	.562	5	3	0	.625	0	0	0	—	1	—
18	Arthur Valpey	1950–51	16	7	9	0	.438	2	4	0	.333	0	0	0	—	0	—
19	Robert Ingalls	1952–63	106	49	54	3	.476	29	16	3	.635	0	0	0	—	6	—
20	Rick Forzano	1964–65	18	7	10	1	.417	4	3	1	.563	0	0	0	—	0	—
21	John Toner	1966–70	47	20	24	3	.457	17	6	2	.720	0	0	0	—	2	Husky of Honor (as athletic director)
22	Robert Casciola	1971–72	18	9	8	1	.528	8	2	1	.773	0	0	0	—	1	—
23	Larry Naviaux	1973–76	43	18	24	1	.430	13	8	1	.614	0	0	0	—	1	—
24	Walt Nadzak	1977–82	65	24	39	2	.385	14	15	1	.483	0	0	0	—	1	—
25	Tom Jackson	1983–93	119	62	57	0	.521	42	35	0	.545	0	0	0	0	2	Yankee Conference Coach of the Year (1986) UPI New England Coach of the Year (1986)
26	Skip Holtz	1994–98	57	34	23	0	.596	22	18	0	.550	1	1	0	1	0	—
27	Randy Edsall	1999–2010	144	74	70	—	.514	25	31	—	.446	3	2	—	0	2	Big East Coach of the Year (2010)
28	Paul Pasqualoni	2011–13 (Note: Paul Pasqualoni was fired following the first four games of the 2013 season, which constituted the entire non-conference portion of that year's schedule. Interim coach T. J. Weist took over for the remaining eight games of the season, which constituted the entire conference portion of the schedule.^{[General]})	28	10	18	—	.357	5	9	—	.357	0	0	—	—	0	—
Int.	T. J. Weist	2013	8	3	5	—	.375	3	5	—	.375	0	0	—	—	0	—
29	Bob Diaco	2014–16	37	11	26	—	.297	6	18	—	.250	0	1	—	0	0	—
30	Randy Edsall	2017–2021	38	6	32	—	.158	2	22	—	.083	0	0	—	0	0	—
Int.	Lou Spanos	2021	7	1	6	—	.143	–	–	—	–	0	0	—	0	0	—
31	Jim L. Mora	2022–2025	50	27	23	—	.540	0	0	—	–	1	1	—	0	0	—
Int.	Gordon Sammis	2025	1	0	1	—	.000	0	0	—	—	0	1	—	0	0	—
32	Jason Candle	2026–Present	0	0	0	—		0	0	—							—
