= 1904 Connecticut Aggies football team =

American college football season

1904 Connecticut Aggies football
- Conference: Athletic League of New England State Colleges
- Record: 5–3–1 (0–0–1 New England)
- Head coach: Edwin O. Smith (3rd season)
- Home stadium: Athletic Fields

The 1904 Connecticut Aggies football team represented Connecticut Agricultural College, now the University of Connecticut, in the 1904 college football season. This was the ninth year that the school fielded a football team. The Aggies were led by third-year head coach Edwin O. Smith, and completed the season with a record of 5–3–1.

== Schedule ==
Date	Time	Opponent	Site	Result	Source
September 24		at Springfield Training School*	Springfield, MA	L 0–23	
October 1		at Hartford Public High School*	Hartford, CT	W 12–5	
October 8		Rockville Town*	Athletic Fields; Storrs, CT	W 11–0	
October 15		Cushing Academy*	Athletic Fields; Storrs, CT	W 11–0	
October 26		Williston*	Athletic Fields; Storrs, CT	L 6–36	
October 31		at Wilbraham Wesleyan Academy*	Wilbraham, MA	W 17–0	
November 5		Springfield Central High School*	Athletic Fields; Storrs, CT	L 0–5	
November 12		at Norwich Free Academy*	Norwich, CT	W 16–6	
November 19	3:00 p.m.	vs. Rhode Island	Windham baseball field; Willimantic, CT (rivalry)	T 10–10	
*Non-conference game
