= 1904 Rhode Island football team =

American college football season

1904 Rhode Island football
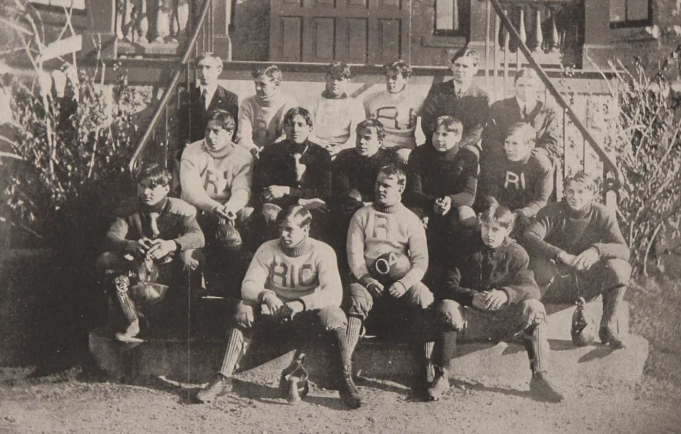
- Conference: Athletic League of New England State Colleges
- Record: 3–3–1 (0–1 New England)
- Head coach: Marshall Tyler (6th season)
- Captain: A. E. Wilkinson

The 1904 Rhode Island football team represented Rhode Island College of Agriculture and the Mechanic Arts, now known as the University of Rhode Island, as a member of the Athletic League of New England State Colleges (commonly referred to as New England League) during the 1904 college football season. In the team's sixth season under Marshall Tyler, the team compiled an overall record of 3–3–1, a 0–1 record in conference play, and outscored opponents by a total of 119 to 72. It was the team's ninth season of intercollegiate football.

== Schedule ==
Date	Time	Opponent	Site	Result	Attendance	Source
September 28		Westerly High School		W 54–0		
October 1		at Springfield Training School	Springfield, MA	L 0–27		
October 8		B.M.C. Durfee High School	Kingston, RI	W 23–0		
October 15	3:30 p.m.	Thibodeau Academy	Kingston, RI	W 32–0	500	
October 29		at Dean Academy	Franklin, MA	L 0–28		
November 1		Brown freshmen	Kingston, RI	L 0–7		
November 19	3:00 p.m.	vs. Connecticut	Windham baseball field; Willimantic, CT (rivalry)	T 10–10		

== Roster ==
Rhode Island 1904 roster
Guards: Benjamin Arnold; F. G. Crandall; A. S. Miner; Tackles: Lee Harding; Mills	Center: L. G. Schermerhorn; Ends: Lewis Slack; C. P. Hubbard; J. D. Drew; W. H. Briggs	Backs: A. E. Wilkinson (C); J. R. Ferry; Stephen Quinn; W. N. Berry

The assistant coaches were Maurice A. Blake and Laurence I. Hewes.
