= 1899 Rhode Island football team =

American college football season

1899 Rhode Island football
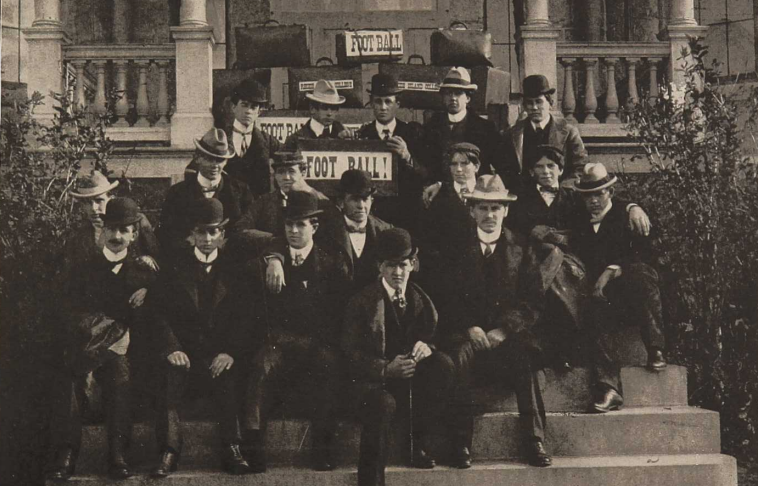
- Conference: Athletic League of New England State Colleges
- Record: 2–3–1 (0–1 New England)
- Head coach: Marshall Tyler (2nd season)
- Captain: Tiberio Aloma

The 1899 Rhode Island football team represented Rhode Island College of Agriculture and the Mechanic Arts, now known as the University of Rhode Island, as a member of the Athletic League of New England State Colleges (commonly referred to as New England League) during the 1899 college football season. In the team's second season under Marshall Tyler, the team compiled an overall record of 2–3–1, a 0–1 record in conference play, and were outscored by a total of 50 to 44. It was the team's fifth season of intercollegiate football.

== Schedule ==
Date	Opponent	Site	Result
October 1	Dean Academy*	Kingston, RI	W 11–0
October 14	Brown freshmen*	Kingston, RI	L 5–6
October 18	Westerly High School*	Kingston, RI	T 0–0
October 28	Brown sophomores*	Kingston, RI	Canceled
November 4	Brown freshmen*	Kingston, RI	Canceled
November 8	South Kingstown High School*	Kingston, RI	W 22–0
November 11	Friends School*	Kingston, RI	L 6–27
November 18	at Connecticut	Athletic Fields; Storrs, CT (rivalry)	L 0–17
*Non-conference game

== Roster ==
Rhode Island 1899 roster
Guards: F. Moxie; Maxom; Elverton Crandall; Tackles: W. M. Hoxie; Ernest Barber; James Cargill; E. A. Tefft	Center: R. B. MacKnight; Tiberio Aloma (C); Ends: J. Wilby; Bailey Cornell; Charles Cross; Anthony Steere	Backs: Ralph Soule; J. E. Duffy; Arthur Denico; Arthur Munro; John James Fry; Charles Burgess
