= 1899 Connecticut Aggies football team =

American college football season

1899 Connecticut Aggies football
- Conference: Athletic League of New England State Colleges
- Record: 6–2 (1–1 New England)
- Head coach: T. D. Knowles (1st season)
- Home stadium: Athletic Fields

The 1899 Connecticut Aggies football team represented Connecticut Agricultural College, now the University of Connecticut, in the 1899 college football season. This was the fourth year that the school fielded a football team. The Aggies were led by first year head coach T. D. Knowles, and completed the season with a record of 6–2.

== Schedule ==
| Date | Opponent | Site | Result |
|---|---|---|---|
| September 30 | Rockville High School* | Athletic Fields; Storrs, CT | W 12–0 |
| October 7 | Willimantic Business College* | Athletic Fields; Storrs, CT | W 5–0 |
| October 14 | at Norwich Free Academy* | Norwich, CT | W 24–0 |
| October 23 | Wilbraham Wesleyan Academy* | Athletic Fields; Storrs, CT | W 26–0 |
| November 4 | at Massachusetts | Alumni Field; Amherst, MA (rivalry) | L 6–34 |
| November 11 | Springfield YMCA* | Springfield, MA | W 12–5 |
| November 18 | Rhode Island | Athletic Fields; Storrs, CT (rivalry) | W 17–0 |
| November 25 | at Waterbury YMCA* | Waterbury, CT | L 5–23 |
*Non-conference game
