= 1903 Connecticut Aggies football team =

American college football season

1903 Connecticut Aggies football
- Conference: Athletic League of New England State Colleges
- Record: 3–5 (0–1 New England)
- Head coach: Edwin O. Smith (2nd season)
- Home stadium: Athletic Fields

The 1903 Connecticut Aggies football team represented Connecticut Agricultural College, now the University of Connecticut, in the 1903 college football season. This was the eighth year that the school fielded a football team. The Aggies were led by second-year head coach Edwin O. Smith, and completed the season with a record of 3–5.

== Schedule ==
Date	Opponent	Site	Result
September 26	Willimantic High School*	Athletic Fields; Storrs, CT	W 30–0
October 3	Hartford Public High School*	Athletic Fields; Storrs, CT	W 6–0
October 14	at Pomfret School*	Pomfret, CT	W 6–5
October 17	Springfield Central High School*	Athletic Fields; Storrs, CT	L 5–6
October 24	at Williston*	Easthampton, MA	L 0–24
November 2	Wilbraham Wesleyan Academy*	Athletic Fields; Storrs, CT	L 0–11
November 7	at Friends School*	Providence, RI	L 0–33
November 14	at Rhode Island	Kingston, RI (rivalry)	L 6–11
*Non-conference game
