= 1902 Connecticut Aggies football team =

American college football season

1902 Connecticut Aggies football
- Conference: Athletic League of New England State Colleges
- Record: 4–2 (0–0 New England)
- Head coach: Edwin O. Smith (1st season)
- Home stadium: Athletic Fields

The 1902 Connecticut Aggies football team represented Connecticut Agricultural College, now the University of Connecticut, in the 1902 college football season. This was the seventh year that the school fielded a football team. The Aggies were led by first-year head coach Edwin O. Smith, and completed the season with a record of 4–3.

== Schedule ==
Date	Opponent	Site	Result
September 27	at Hartford Public High School*	Hartford, CT	L 0–6
October 4	at Norwich Free Academy*	Norwich, CT	W 16–0
October 11	Willimantic Hustlers*	Athletic Fields; Storrs, CT	W 28–0
October 18	at Springfield Training School*	Springfield, MA	L 0–48
October 25	at Williston*	Easthampton, MA	L 5–6
October 27	at Wilbraham Wesleyan Academy*	Wilbraham, MA	W 12–6
November 22	Westerly High School*	Athletic Fields; Storrs, CT	W 23–0
*Non-conference game
