= 1900 Connecticut Aggies football team =

American college football season

1900 Connecticut Aggies football
- Conference: Athletic League of New England State Colleges
- Record: 4–3–1 (1–1 New England)
- Head coach: T. D. Knowles (2nd season)
- Home stadium: Athletic Fields

The 1900 Connecticut Aggies football team represented Connecticut Agricultural College, now the University of Connecticut, in the 1900 college football season. This was the fifth year that the school fielded a football team. The Aggies were led by second year head coach T. D. Knowles, and completed the season with a record of 4–3–1.

== Schedule ==
Date	Opponent	Site	Result
September 22	at Hartford Public High School*	Hartford, CT	W 6–0
September 29	Willimantic YMCA*	Athletic Fields; Storrs, CT	W 33–0
October 6	Taft School*	Athletic Fields; Storrs, CT	W 11–0
October 18	at Trinity (CT)*	Jessee/Miller Field; Hartford, CT	L 0–6
October 21	at Rhode Island	Kingston, RI (rivalry)	W 43–0
November 3	Massachusetts	Athletic Fields; Storrs, CT (rivalry)	L 6–17
November 24	Springfield YMCA*	Athletic Fields; Storrs, CT	T 5–5
November 29	Waterbury YMCA	Athletic Fields; Storrs, CT	L 0–17
*Non-conference game
