= 1900 Rhode Island football team =

American college football season

1900 Rhode Island football
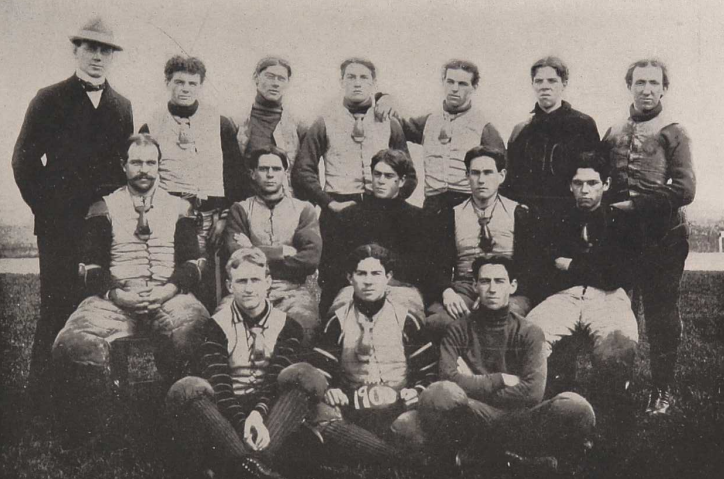
- Conference: Athletic League of New England State Colleges
- Record: 0–1–2 (0–1 New England)
- Head coach: Marshall Tyler (3rd season)
- Captain: J. E. Duffy

The 1900 Rhode Island football team represented Rhode Island College of Agriculture and the Mechanic Arts, now known as the University of Rhode Island, as a member of the Athletic League of New England State Colleges (commonly referred to as New England League) during the 1900 college football season. In the team's third season under Marshall Tyler, the team compiled an overall record of 0–1–2, a 0–1 record in conference play, and were outscored by a total of 48 to 5. It was the team's sixth season of intercollegiate football.

== Schedule ==
Date	Opponent	Site	Result
October 14	at Rogers High School*	Newport, RI	T 5–5
October 21	Connecticut	Kingston, RI (rivalry)	L 0–43
October 21	at Friends School*		T 0–0
*Non-conference game

== Roster ==
Rhode Island 1900 roster
Guards: F. Hoxsie; Elverton Crandall; Tackles: E. A. Tefft; W. M. Hoxsie	Center: H. D. Smith; Ends: Clarner; F. Carley	Backs: J. E. Duffy (C); Arthur Denico; A. Smith; Kenyon

Reserves were Tiberio Aloma, Bailey Cornell, Whitmore, Loomis, Watson, Schofield, McCarthy, and Briggs.
