= 1901 Connecticut Aggies football team =

American college football season

1901 Connecticut Aggies football
- Conference: Athletic League of New England State Colleges
- Record: 8–2 (1–0 New England)
- Head coach: T. D. Knowles (3rd season)
- Home stadium: Athletic Fields

The 1901 Connecticut Aggies football team represented Connecticut Agricultural College, now the University of Connecticut, in the 1901 college football season. This was the sixth year that the school fielded a football team. The Aggies were led by third year head coach T. D. Knowles, and completed the season with a record of 8–2.

== Schedule ==
| Date | Opponent | Site | Result |
|---|---|---|---|
| September 21 | at Hartford Public High School* | Hartford, CT | L 0–17 |
| September 28 | Willimantic YMCA* | Athletic Fields; Storrs, CT | W 17–0 |
| October 12 | Rockville Regulars* | Athletic Fields; Storrs, CT | W 0–17 |
| October 19 | at Middletown High School* | Middletown, CT | W 28–0 |
| October 26 | Rhode Island | Athletic Fields; Storrs, CT (rivalry) | W 27–0 |
| November 2 | at Pomfret School* | Pomfret, CT | W 6–0 |
| November 4 | at Wilbraham Wesleyan Academy* | Wilbraham, MA | W 21–11 |
| November 9 | Williston* | Athletic Fields; Storrs, CT | L 0–33 |
| November 16 | at Norwich Free Academy* | Norwich, CT | W 10–6 |
| November 21 | at Willimantic YMCA* | Willimantic, CT | W 17–0 |
*Non-conference game
