= 1903 Massachusetts Aggies football team =

American college football season

1903 Massachusetts Aggies football
- Conference: Athletic League of New England State Colleges
- Record: 5–4 ( Athletic League of New England State Colleges)
- Head coach: James Halligan (3rd season)
- Captain: George E. O'Hearn
- Home stadium: Alumni Field

The 1903 Massachusetts Aggies football team represented Massachusetts Agricultural College in the 1903 college football season. The team was coached by James Halligan and played its home games at Alumni Field in Amherst, Massachusetts. The 1903 season was Halligan's last as head coach of the Aggies. Massachusetts finished the season with a record of 5–4.

== Schedule ==
Date	Opponent	Site	Result	Source
September 25	at Holy Cross	Holy Cross Field; Worcester, MA	L 0–6	
October 1	at Dartmouth	Alumni Oval; Hanover, NH	L 0–12	
October 7	at Williams	Weston Field; Williamstown, MA	L 0–17	
October 14	Rhode Island	Alumni Field; Amherst, MA	W 46–0	
October 17	at Springfield Training School	Springfield, MA	W 12–0	
October 24	at Vermont	Athletic Park; Burlington, VT	W 5–0	
October 31	at Trinity (CT)	Trinity Field; Hartford, CT	W 28–0	
November 7	at Tufts	Tufts Oval; Somerville, MA	W 6–0	
November 14	at Amherst	Pratt Field; Amherst, MA	L 6–11	
