= 1903 Rhode Island football team =

American football team

1903 Rhode Island football
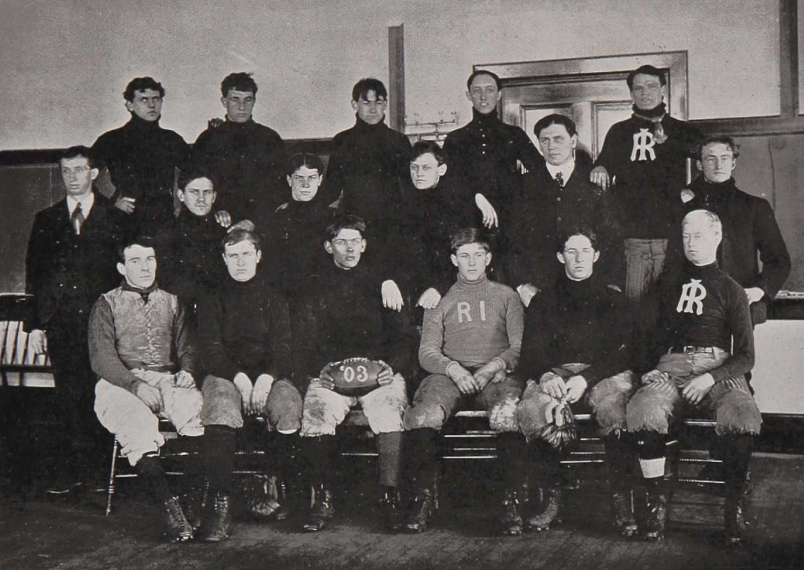
- Conference: Athletic League of New England State Colleges
- Record: 2–4–1 (1–1 New England)
- Head coach: Marshall Tyler (5th season)
- Captain: Fred C. Hoxsie
- Home stadium: College Field

The 1903 Rhode Island football team represented Rhode Island College of Agriculture and the Mechanic Arts, now known as the University of Rhode Island, as a member of the Athletic League of New England State Colleges (commonly referred to as New England League) during the 1903 college football season. In the team's fifth season under Marshall Tyler, the team compiled an overall record of 2–4–1, a 1–1 record in conference play, and were outscored by a total of 37 to 149. It was the team's eighth season of intercollegiate football.

Laurence I. Hewes served as an assistant coach.

== Schedule ==
Date	Opponent	Site	Result	Source
October 3	B.M.C. Durfee High School*	College Field; Kingston, RI	T 0–0	
October 14	at Massachusetts	Alumni Field; Amherst, MA	L 0–46	
October 17	Brown freshmen*		L 0–22	
October 24	Friends School*		W 5–0 (forfeit)	
October 31	Worcester Tech*		L 0–45	
November 7	Dean Academy*		L 0–30	
November 14	Connecticut	Kingston, RI (rivalry)	W 11–6	
*Non-conference game

== Roster ==
Rhode Island 1903 roster
Guards: J. P. Grinnell; J. W. Mills; Tackles: Fred C. Hoxsie (C); J. G. Boston; Knight	Center: L. L. Harding; Ends: J. C. Smith; F. B. Hodges; Kendrick	Backs: A. E. Wilkinson; Soule; Brett; W. N. Berry; J. R. Ferry; S. Quinn
