= 1898 Rhode Island football team =

American college football season

1898 Rhode Island football
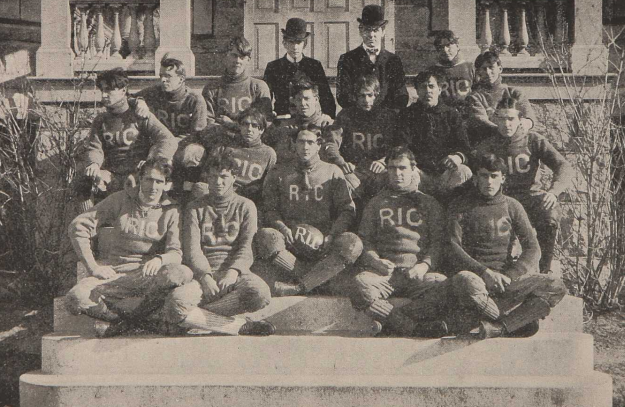
- Conference: Athletic League of New England State Colleges
- Record: 5–0 (0–0 New England)
- Head coach: Marshall Tyler (1st season)
- Captain: William F. Owen

The 1898 Rhode Island football team represented Rhode Island College of Agriculture and the Mechanic Arts, now known as the University of Rhode Island, as a member of the Athletic League of New England State Colleges (commonly referred to as New England League) during the 1898 college football season. In the team's first season under Marshall Tyler, the team compiled an undefeated overall record of 5–0 and outscored opponents by a total of 68 to 6. It was the team's fourth season of intercollegiate football.

== Schedule ==
Date	Opponent	Site	Result
October 7	Westerly High School*	Kingston, RI	W 12–6
October 15	Westerly Athletic Association*	Kingston, RI	W 33–0
October 29	Providence High School*	Kingston, RI	W 16–0
November 5	Brown freshmen*	Kingston, RI	W 5–0
November 12	East Greenwich Academy*	Kingston, RI	W 2–0
*Non-conference game

== Roster ==
Rhode Island 1898 roster
Guards: Arthur A. Sherman; Robert E. Grinnell; Tackles: James R. Emmett; W. M. Hoxie	Center: R. B. MacKnight; Ends: Charles C. Cross; Ralph O. Brooks	Backs: William F. Owen (C); John James Fry; Leroy W. Knowles; Ralph N. Soule

Reserves were F. Hoxie, Anthony E. Steere, Arthur A. Denico, Louis J. Reuter, Ralph N. Maxson, and Charles S. Burgess.
