= 1905 Massachusetts Aggies football team =

American college football season

1905 Massachusetts Aggies football
- Conference: Athletic League of New England State Colleges
- Record: 3–7 ( Athletic League of New England State Colleges)
- Head coach: Walter Craig (1st season)
- Home stadium: Alumni Field

The 1905 Massachusetts Aggies football team represented Massachusetts Agricultural College in the 1905 college football season. The team was coached by Walter Craig and played its home games at Alumni Field in Amherst, Massachusetts. The 1905 season was Craig's only as head coach of the Aggies. Massachusetts finished the season with a record of 3–7.

== Schedule ==
Date	Opponent	Site	Result	Source
September 23	at Holy Cross	Fitton Field; Worcester, MA	L 0–17	
September 30	at Dartmouth	Alumni Oval; Hanover, NH	L 0–18	
October 4	at Brown	Andrews Field; Providence, RI	L 0–24	
October 7	Rhode Island	Alumni Field; Amherst, MA	W 11–0	
October 11	at Williams	Weston Field; Williamstown, MA	L 0–12	
October 14	New Hampshire	Alumni Field; Amherst, MA (rivalry)	W 15–0	
October 21	at Bates	Garcelon Field; Lewiston, ME	L 0–16	
October 28	at Phillips Academy	Andover, MA	L 0–30	
November 18	at Springfield Training School	Springfield, MA	W 15–0	
November 24	at Tufts	Tufts Oval; Somerville, MA	L 6–8	
