= 1901 Rhode Island football team =

American college football season

1901 Rhode Island football
- Conference: Athletic League of New England State Colleges
- Record: 0–2 (0–1 New England)
- Head coach: Marshall Tyler (4th season)
- Captains: Kenyon; Steere

The 1901 Rhode Island football team represented Rhode Island College of Agriculture and the Mechanic Arts, now known as the University of Rhode Island, as a member of the Athletic League of New England State Colleges (commonly referred to as New England League) during the 1901 college football season. In the team's fourth season under Marshall Tyler, the team compiled an overall record of 0–2, a 0–1 record in conference play, and were outscored by a total of 37 to 0. It was the team's seventh season of intercollegiate football.

Laurence I. Hewes served as an assistant coach.

== Schedule ==
Date	Opponent	Site	Result
November 3	at Connecticut	Athletic Fields; Storrs, CT (rivalry)	L 0–27
November 17	Brown sophomores*	Kingston, RI	L 0–10
*Non-conference game

== Roster ==
Rhode Island 1901 roster
Guards: Ernest A. Tefft; F. Hoxsie; Tackles: Bristow; Flagg	Center: H. D. Smith; Ends: Watson; R. W. Kent; John Wilby	Backs: Arthur Denico; Charles Whitmore; Steere (C); Kenyon (C)

Reserves were Tiberio Aloma, V. W. Dow, F. Storey, J. M. McDonald, Dilatush, Willard Hoxsie, and Urratia.
