= 1905 Connecticut Aggies football team =

American college football season

1905 Connecticut Aggies football
- Conference: Athletic League of New England State Colleges
- Record: 2–2 (0–0 New England)
- Head coach: Edwin O. Smith (4th season)
- Home stadium: Athletic Fields

The 1905 Connecticut Aggies football team represented Connecticut Agricultural College, now the University of Connecticut, in the 1905 college football season. This was the tenth year that the school fielded a football team. The Aggies were led by fourth-year head coach Edwin O. Smith, and completed the season with a record of 2–2.

== Schedule ==
Date	Opponent	Site	Result
September 23	at Springfield Training School*	Springfield, MA	L 0–21
September 30	at Wesleyan*	Andrus Field; Middletown, CT	L 0–38
October 14	New Britain High School*	Athletic Fields; Storrs, CT	W 17–0
November 11	Springfield Central High School*	Athletic Fields; Storrs, CT	W 10–0
*Non-conference game
