= 1904 Springfield Training School football team =

American college football season

1904 Springfield Training School football
- Conference: Independent
- Record: 4–4–1
- Head coach: Charles E. Street (1st season)
- Captain: Dexter W. Draper

1904 Eastern college football independents records
	Conf.			Overall
Team	W	L	T	W		L		T
Penn		–		12	–	0	–	0
Western U. of Penn.		–		10	–	0	–	0
Dartmouth		–		7	–	0	–	1
Yale		–		10	–	1	–	0
Amherst		–		9	–	1	–	0
Colgate		–		8	–	1	–	1
Carlisle		–		10	–	2	–	0
Lafayette		–		8	–	2	–	0
Princeton		–		8	–	2	–	0
Army		–		7	–	2	–	0
Fordham		–		4	–	1	–	1
Harvard		–		7	–	2	–	1
Dickinson		–		8	–	3	–	1
Columbia		–		7	–	3	–	0
Cornell		–		7	–	3	–	0
Villanova		–		4	–	2	–	1
Syracuse		–		6	–	3	–	0
Swarthmore		–		6	–	3	–	0
Washington & Jefferson		–		5	–	3	–	1
Penn State		–		6	–	4	–	0
Temple		–		3	–	2	–	0
Brown		–		6	–	5	–	0
Bucknell		–		3	–	3	–	0
Springfield Training School		–		4	–	4	–	1
NYU		–		3	–	6	–	0
Holy Cross		–		2	–	5	–	2
Wesleyan		–		3	–	7	–	0
Geneva		–		1	–	4	–	2
Vermont		–		1	–	5	–	2
New Hampshire		–		2	–	5	–	0
Rutgers		–		1	–	6	–	2
Tufts		–		2	–	9	–	1
Lehigh		–		1	–	8	–	0
Franklin & Marshall		–		0	–	10	–	0

The 1904 Springfield Training School football team was an American football team that represented the International Young Men's Christian Association Training School—now known as Springfield College–as an independent during the 1904 college football season. Led by first-year head coach Charles E. Street, the team compiled a record of 4–4–1.

== Schedule ==
Date	Opponent	Site	Result	Attendance	Source
September 24	Connecticut	Springfield, MA	W 23–0		
October 1	Rhode Island	Springfield, MA	W 27–0		
October 5	at Williston Seminary	Easthampton, MA	W 28–0		
October 12	at Yale	Yale Field; New Haven, CT	L 0–6	100	
October 15	at Orange Athletic Club	Orange, NJ	W 38–0		
October 22	Massachusetts	Springfield, MA	L 0–11	2,000	
October 29	Worcester Tech	Springfield, MA	T 0–0		
November 5	at Tufts	Tufts Oval; Medford, MA	L 10–23		
November 24	at Holy Cross	Holy Cross Field; Worcester, MA	L 9–12		
