= Charles E. Street =

American football player, coach, and physician (1873–1950)

Biographical details
- Born: April 6, 1873; Lee, Massachusetts, U.S.
- Died: October 13, 1950 (aged 77); Pittsfield, Massachusetts, U.S.
- Education: Williams (1896)

Playing career
- 1895: Williams
- 1898–1899: Michigan
- Position: Quarterback

Coaching career (HC unless noted)
- 1902: Monmouth (IL)
- 1904–1906: Springfield Training School

Head coaching record
- Overall: 12–20–4

Charles E. Street (April 6, 1873 – October 13, 1950) was an American college football player and coach and physician. He served as the head football coach at Monmouth College in Monmouth, Illinois, in 1902 and at Springfield College (then known as the Springfield YMCA Training School) from 1904 to 1906. He played football at the University of Michigan, where he was the starting quarterback for three games in 1898 and for six games in 1899.

Street was born on April 6, 1873, in Lee, Massachusetts, and graduated there from Lee High School. He graduated from Williams College in 1896 and the University of Michigan Medical School. He practiced medicine for 47 years in Springfield, Massachusetts. Street died on October 13, 1950, at Pittsfield General Hospital in Pittsfield, Massachusetts.

== Head coaching record ==
Year	Team	Overall	Conference	Standing	Bowl/playoffs
Monmouth Fighting Scots (Independent) (1902)
1902	Monmouth	3–6			
Monmouth:		3–6			
Springfield Training School (Independent) (1904–1906)
1904	Springfield Training School	4–4–1			
1905	Springfield Training School	3–5			
1906	Springfield Training School	1–5–3			
Springfield Training School:		8–14–4			
Total:		12–20–4			
