= 1914 Connecticut Aggies football team =

American college football season

1914 Connecticut Aggies football
- Conference: Athletic League of New England State Colleges
- Record: 3–0 (0–0 New England)
- Head coach: Dave Warner (1st season)
- Home stadium: Athletic Fields

The 1914 Connecticut Aggies football team represented Connecticut Agricultural College, now the University of Connecticut, in the 1914 college football season. The Aggies were led by first-year head coach Dave Warner, and completed the season with a record of 3–0.

== Schedule ==
Date	Opponent	Site	Result
October 3	Norwich Free Academy*	Athletic Fields; Storrs, CT	W 12–0
October 10	Fort Wright*	Athletic Fields; Storrs, CT	W 19–0
October 17	at Williston*	Easthampton, MA	W 17–9
*Non-conference game
