= Marshall Tyler =

American football player and coach (1873–1942)

Biographical details
- Born: June 12, 1873; Staffordville, Connecticut, U.S.
- Died: December 16, 1942 (aged 69); Wakefield, Rhode Island, U.S.

Playing career
- 1894–1896: Amherst
- Position: Right tackle

Coaching career (HC unless noted)
- 1898–1908: Rhode Island

Head coaching record
- Overall: 25–22–10

Marshall Henry "Tip" Tyler (June 12, 1873 – December 16, 1942) was the head coach of the Rhode Island football team in the early 20th century. He compiled a 25–22–10 record. He was first hired in 1898 as headmaster of the two-year preparatory high school program of the college. This preparatory school was continued for ten years until 1908, when Tyler moved on to chair the college's Mathematics Department. He was mathematics professor at the college until his death on December 16, 1942. Tyler Hall on the University of Rhode Island campus in Kingston was named in his honor.

== Head coaching record ==
Year	Team	Overall	Conference	Standing	Bowl/playoffs
Rhode Island (Athletic League of New England State Colleges) (1898–1908)
1898	Rhode Island	5–0	0–0		
1899	Rhode Island	2–3–1	0–1		
1900	Rhode Island	2–2–3	0–1		
1901	Rhode Island	0–2	0–1		
1902	No team				
1903	Rhode Island	2–4–1	1–1		
1904	Rhode Island	3–3–1	0–0–1		
1905	Rhode Island	3–3–1	0–1		
1906	Rhode Island	1–2–1	0–0		
1907	Rhode Island State	3–1–2	1–1		
1908	Rhode Island State	4–2	1–1		
Rhode Island / Rhode Island State:		25–22–10	3–7–1		
Total:		25–22–10			
