= 1905 Rhode Island football team =

American college football season

1905 Rhode Island football
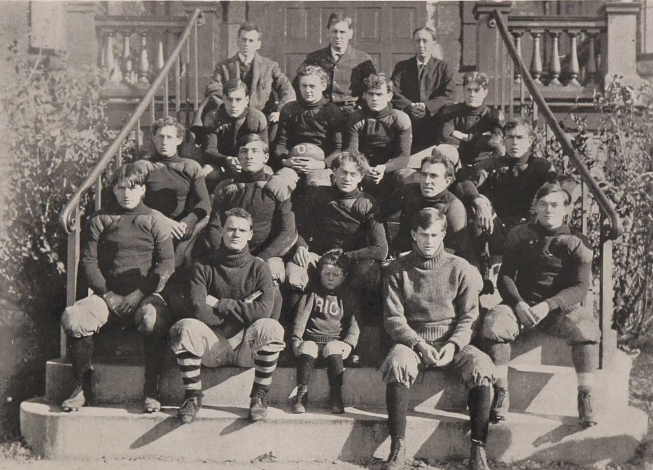
- Conference: Athletic League of New England State Colleges
- Record: 3–3–1 (0–1 New England)
- Head coach: Marshall Tyler (7th season)
- Captain: W. N. Berry

The 1905 Rhode Island football team represented Rhode Island College of Agriculture and the Mechanic Arts, now known as the University of Rhode Island, as a member of the Athletic League of New England State Colleges (commonly referred to as New England League) during the 1905 college football season. In the team's seventh season under Marshall Tyler, the team compiled an overall record of 3–3–1, a 0–1 record in conference play, and outscored opponents by a total of 101 to 51. It was the team's tenth season of intercollegiate football.

== Schedule ==
| Date | Opponent | Site | Result | Attendance | Source |
|---|---|---|---|---|---|
| September 23 | at New Hampshire | Central Park; Dover, NH | L 0–6 | | |
| October 4 | East Greenwich Academy | Kingston, RI | W 10–0 | | |
| October 7 | at Massachusetts | Alumni Field; Amherst, MA | L 0–11 | | |
| October 21 | Brown seconds | Kingston, RI | T 5–5 | | |
| October 28 | Brown freshmen | Kingston, RI | W 40–0 | | |
| November 4 | Brown sophomores | Kingston, RI | W 34–0 | | |
| November 11 | at Trinity (CT) | Hartford, CT | L 12–29 | 500 | |

== Roster ==
Rhode Island 1905 roster
| Guards: Fred Crandall; Jason Grinnell; Tackles: L. G. Schermerhorn; Lee Harding | Center: M. Ingalls; Ends: Lewis Slack; J. D. Drew; C. W. Mitchell; Smith | Backs: W. N. Berry (C); J. R. Ferry; Stephen Quinn; J. M. Craig |

The assistant coach was Maurice A. Blake.
