= Robert Bingham (American football) =

American football player and coach (1888–1929)

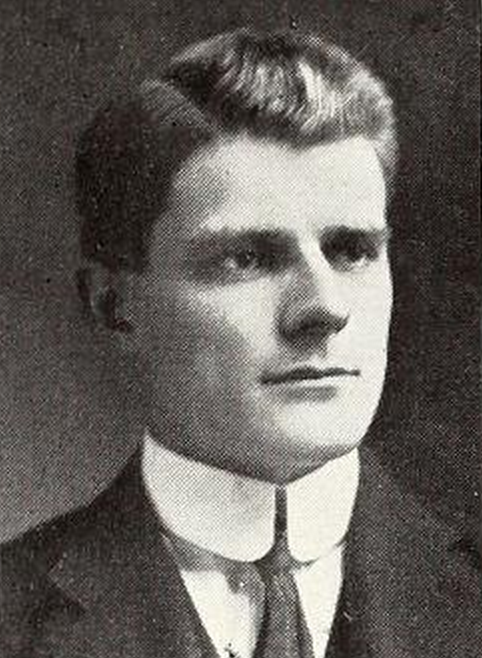
- Bingham pictured in Liber brunensis 1911, Brown yearbook

Biographical details
- Born: February 14, 1888; East Haddam, Connecticut, U.S.
- Died: March 8, 1929 (aged 41); East Haddam, Connecticut, U.S.
- Education: Brown University (1911)

Playing career
- 1910: Brown
- Position: Fullback

Coaching career (HC unless noted)
- 1912: Rhode Island State

Head coaching record
- Overall: 6–3

Robert Wellington Bingham Jr. (February 14, 1888 – March 8, 1929) was an American football coach. He served as the head football coach at the Rhode Island State College—now known as the University of Rhode Island— in 1912, compiling record of 6–3.

Born in East Haddam, Connecticut, to Robert Wellington Bingham Sr., a prominent resident of East Haddam, and Mary T. Varley, Bingham graduated from Brown University in the class of 1911. He died in 1929 and was buried at East Haddam.

== Head coaching record ==
Year	Team	Overall	Conference	Standing	Bowl/playoffs
Rhode Island State (Athletic League of New England State Colleges) (1912)
1912	Rhode Island State	6–3	1–0		
Rhode Island State:		6–3	1–0		
Total:		6–3			
