= 1898 Storrs Aggies football team =

American college football season

1898 Storrs Aggies football
- Conference: Athletic League of New England State Colleges
- Record: 0–3 (0–0 New England)
- Head coach: E. S. Mansfield (1st season)
- Home stadium: Athletic Fields

The 1898 Storrs Aggies football team represented Storrs Agricultural College, now the University of Connecticut, in the 1898 college football season. This was the third year that the school fielded a football team. The Aggies played their first season with a head coach, E. S. Mansfield, and completed the season with a record of 0–3.

E. C. Welden was the manager for the team's first game, but resigned and was replaced by H. W. Emmons for the remainder of the season.

== Schedule ==
Date	Opponent	Site	Result	Source
October 1	at Willimantic High School*	Willimantic, CT	L 0–17	
October 8	Putnam High School*		Canceled	
October 22	Morse School of Business*	Athletic Fields; Storrs, CT	?	
October 29	at Norwich Free Academy*	Norwich, CT	L 0–43	
November 5	Willimantic High School*	Athletic Fields; Storrs, CT	L 0–29	
*Non-conference game
