= T. D. Knowles =

American football and baseball coach (1868–1935)

Biographical details
- Born: May 17, 1868; Waterbury, Connecticut, U.S.
- Died: September 20, 1935 (aged 67); New Haven, Connecticut, U.S.

Coaching career (HC unless noted)

Football
- 1899–1901: Connecticut

Baseball
- 1899–1901: Connecticut

Head coaching record
- Overall: 18–7–1 (football); 12–8–1 (baseball)

Thomas Dodd Knowles (May 17, 1868 – September 20, 1935) was an American college football and college baseball coach. He served as the head football coach at the University of Connecticut from 1899 to 1901. He also served as UConn's head baseball coach from 1899 to 1901.

== Head coaching record ==
=== Football ===
Year	Team	Overall	Conference	Standing	Bowl/playoffs
Connecticut Aggies (Athletic League of New England State Colleges) (1899–1901)
1899	Connecticut	6–2	1–1		
1900	Connecticut	4–3–1	1–1		
1901	Connecticut	8–2	1–0		
Connecticut:		18–7–1	3–2		
Total:		18–7–1			
