= Edwin O. Smith =

American politician (1871–1960)

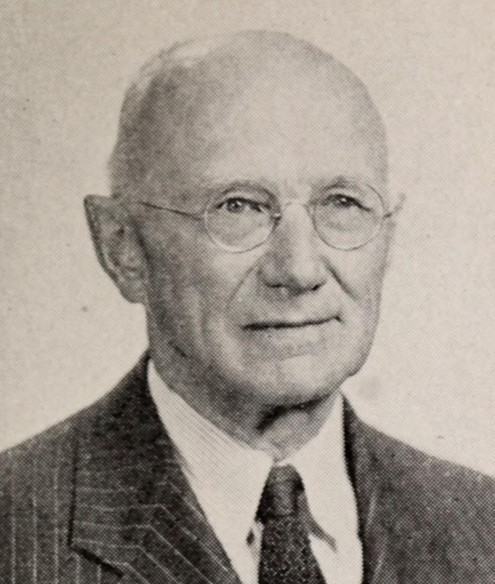
- Smith c. 1946

Member of the Connecticut House of Representatives from Mansfield
- In office 1933–1960
- Preceded by: Annie E. Vinton; Daniel C. Flaherty
- Succeeded by: Foster H. Richards; Willard J. Stearns

Acting President of the University of Connecticut
- In office 1908
- Preceded by: Rufus W. Stimson
- Succeeded by: Charles L. Beach

Personal details
- Born: 1871 Albany, New York, U.S.
- Died: October 28, 1960 (aged 89) Willimantic, Connecticut, U.S.
- Party: Republican
- Education: Wesleyan University
- Occupation: Politician, teacher, coach

Edwin O. Smith
Coaching career (HC unless noted)

Football
- 1894: DePauw
- 1902–1905: Connecticut

Baseball
- 1902–1905: Connecticut

Head coaching record
- Overall: 18–17–1 (football); 13–9–1 (baseball)

Edwin Oscar Smith (1871 – October 28, 1960) was a Connecticut politician who served 28 years in the Connecticut House of Representatives and, from April through September, 1908, was president of the Connecticut Agricultural College, which is now the University of Connecticut.

== Biography ==
Smith was born in 1871 in Albany, New York. He attended Wesleyan University, graduating in 1893. He played professional baseball on teams in Hartford, Connecticut, and the Adirondacks region of New York and he was a baseball and football coach at Depauw University.

Between 1901 and 1916 he was a member of the faculty of the Connecticut Agricultural College (now the University of Connecticut) in Storrs, teaching English and economics. He served as the school's football and baseball coach for four seasons, from 1902 to 1905, compiling a 14–13–1 record in football and a 13–9–1 record in baseball. From April through September 1908 he held the school's interim presidency.

A Republican, Smith was elected to the Connecticut House of Representatives in 1932 and served 14 consecutive two-year terms representing the town of Mansfield. He was seeking re-election to a fifteenth term when he died from a heart attack on October 28, 1960. He also was a member of the Connecticut State Board of Education between 1935 and 1939. As a state legislator, he played a significant role in the enactment of legislation related to education and served as chairman of the Legislative Committee on Education that in 1954 established a formula for state government financial support of public schools.

At the time of his death at the age of 89, Smith was the oldest and longest-serving member of the Connecticut General Assembly.

== E. O. Smith High School ==
E. O. Smith High School, established in 1958 as a regional school to serve the towns of Ashford and Mansfield, is named for him. Originally part of the University of Connecticut campus, owned by the state, and operated by the university, it has been operated as a regional public school since 1987. In 1993 the town of Willington was added to the region served by the school.

== Head coaching record ==
=== Football ===
| Year | Team | Overall | Conference | Standing | Bowl/playoffs |
|---|---|---|---|---|---|
DePauw (Indiana Intercollegiate Athletic Association) (1894)
| 1894 | DePauw | 4–4 | | | |
| DePauw: | | 4–4 | | | |
Connecticut Aggies (Athletic League of New England State Colleges) (1902–1905)
| 1902 | Connecticut | 4–3 | | | |
| 1903 | Connecticut | 3–5 | | | |
| 1904 | Connecticut | 5–3–1 | | | |
| 1905 | Connecticut | 2–2 | | | |
| Connecticut: | | 14–13–1 | | | |
| Total: | | 18–17–1 | | | |

=== Baseball ===
The following table depicts Smith's record as head baseball coach at Connecticut.

Record table
| Season | Team | Overall | Conference | Standing | Postseason |
|---|---|---|---|---|---|
Connecticut Aggies (1902–1905)
| 1902 | Connecticut | 3–1 | | | |
| 1903 | Connecticut | 3–4 | | | |
| 1904 | Connecticut | 3–1 | | | |
| 1905 | Connecticut | 3–3–1 | | | |
| Total: | | 12–9–1 | | | |
