= Westerly High School =

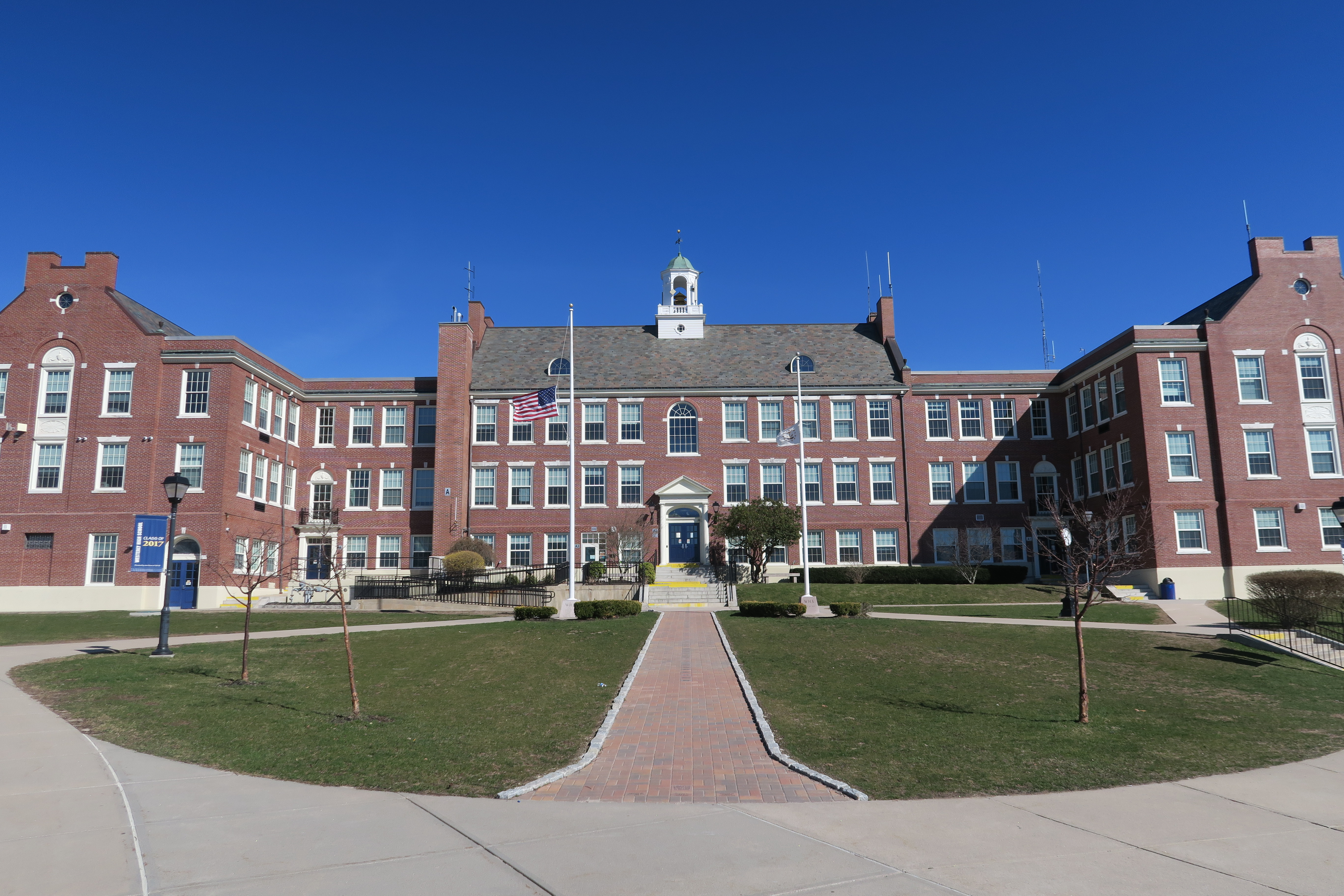

Location
- 23 Ward Avenue; Westerly, Rhode Island 02891; United States; 41°22′33.38″N 71°49′8.8″W

Information
- Type: Public
- Motto: "Home of the Bulldogs"
- Established: 1870
- Teaching staff: 73.00 (FTE)
- Grades: 9–12
- Enrollment: 692 (2023–2024)
- Student to teacher ratio: 9.48
- Campus: Suburban
- Colors: Blue and White
- Mascot: Bulldog
- Nickname: The Bulldogs
- Rival: Stonington High School
- National ranking: 0
- SAT average: 0
- Newspaper: The Barker
- Yearbook: The West'Lyan
- Website: https://whs.wpsri.org/

Westerly High School is a public high school located in Westerly, Rhode Island, United States. The school is part of Westerly Public Schools.

== History ==
Various incarnations of a high school have been serving students in Westerly since shortly after the American Civil War.

Three buildings in the first century (1870–1960).

The first Westerly High School was built at 32 Elm Street in 1870. It cost $10,000 to build.

After about 30 years, the building was too small to support the town's population. This led to the construction of a new building on Broad and Granite Street, which was completed in 1903.

The high school's population began to rise in the late 1920s. This led to the construction of Babcock Junior High School on Highland Avenue, which reduced the high school population to include only students in grades 10–12. Despite this, the school was still not big enough to provide a secondary education to the students of Westerly.

The Broad Street building was abandoned and replaced with a new building, completed in 1937, on Ward Avenue, one block east of Babcock Junior High School. This building became known as Ward Senior High School, named after Rhode Island colonial governor Samuel Ward.

=== Transformation and modernization (1960s–1990s) ===
Throughout the 1960s, the Westerly Public Schools underwent transformations. A fifth elementary school (Dunn's Corners) was added. In addition, Babcock Junior High and Westerly High were renovated. The high school got a new library, new science rooms, new music rooms, and new general classrooms.

In the mid–1970s, ninth grade returned to the high school. High enrollment and the extra grade led to the creation of a new gymnasium (Federico Gymnasium) and new classrooms. The new wing – built on a practice field near Park Avenue – comprised home economics classrooms, technology classrooms, art classrooms, and general classrooms.

The high school became overcrowded in the 1980s. In 1981, three elementary schools closed: Bradford, High Street, and State Street. This led to an extremely crowded high school that, at some times, housed students in grades 7–12. By 1987, State Street Elementary had reopened, which eliminated the seventh grade from the high school. By 1990, the district was more stable, with Bradford Elementary reopened. (High Street Elementary School never reopened.) The elementary schools housed students up to fourth grade, Babcock became a middle school housing grades 5–7, and the high school housed 8–12.

By 1989, the school made efforts to become more accessible to the handicapped. An elevator was added, the handicap ramp was redesigned, and a dumb waiter was installed in the auditorium. To accommodate the growing population, the library and the cafeteria were also enlarged.

These renovations did not impress officials from the New England Association of Schools and Colleges (NEASC), who criticized Westerly High School’s facilities. Discussion was made about building a new school in Dunn’s Corners, but this idea was widely panned. Instead, voters approved expansion to the middle and high schools.

The high school and other schools underwent renovation and modification in the mid-1990s. Work at the high school included four new classrooms, moving the office to a room on the first floor adjacent to the handicap ramp, replacing that office with a new expanded library, and remaking the old library into the Guidance Department and Social Services. Also, a fifth elementary school, Springbrook, was opened in the fall of 1996. By the fall of 1995, grades K–5 were at the elementary schools, grades 6–8 at the middle school, and grades 9–12 at the high school. However, these renovations were projected to accommodate the town’s growth only until 2005.

The high school also suffered from "turmoil" and administrative instability in the later part of this era. After being shepherded by only two principals from 1966 to 1989, eight different principals served from 1989 to 1997 with six principals in the latter five years.

=== Expansion in the new century (2000–present) ===
In 2001, members from the Gilbane Construction Company argued that Westerly should build or expand its schools.

The superintendent was against expanding the current buildings, so attention directed to the construction of new buildings.  The most profitable property was known as the Panciera Property, located on Route 1.  Ideas included making that a second middle school or an intermediate school.  Another idea included building a new high school on Park Avenue, making the high school the middle school, and making Babcock the administration building, or possibly selling it.  The idea that won over voters was to build a new middle school on the Panciera property, and combining Babcock Middle and the high school into a high school campus.  The property was bought in 2002, and the new Westerly Middle School broke ground in April 2004.[9]

After the completion of the middle school, the attention turned to the high school buildings. The high school’s corridors were renovated and select classrooms received new ceiling tiles. A bridge was installed at Babcock, allowing students to enter from the back, rather than the front. Throughout the 2005–06 school year, Park and Ward Avenues were closed off and made into a quadrangle to ease access between buildings for the high school students.

Three years later, the taxpayers of Westerly decided that further renovation at Westerly High School was necessary. The work began in 2010. In the summer of 2010, most windows were replaced and the 1977 wing was gutted to allow construction of a new science and technology wing. In order to allow for construction, the woodshop was moved to the Babcock Hall Cafeteria. Three classrooms were renovated into computer labs that allowed the remainder of technology teachers to conduct class there until construction was finished. Three Babcock Hall classrooms that were once science labs were converted into two large art classrooms, as the art teachers were displaced from their classrooms on the second floor of the 1977 wing. The child development classroom was also permanently moved to Babcock. Two additional Babcock Hall classrooms (215 and 216) were renovated, along with ten classrooms in the Ward Building. New classrooms had new floor tiles and ceiling tiles with fans, in addition to interactive white board technology.

In February 2011, the new science and technology wing opened. The first floor consists of two physics labs with a prep room separating them, two computer labs, and two woodshops, in addition to pictures of notable physicists and artists. The floor of the entire wing is designed to resemble a DNA molecule. The second floor has three biology labs, three chemistry labs, a teacher office along with several science prep rooms and a "flex" science room.

Meanwhile, the old science classrooms were converted into general classrooms. This work was completed by April 2011. Heavy duty work was done on most of the remainder of the buildings until December 2011. After all the classrooms were touched up, the library was renovated with a new carpet. The desktop computers were replaced with laptops. In the fall of 2012, a classroom within the library was constructed, allowing teachers to conduct classes while using the library’s resources. Starting in 2009, the high school had select programs at Tower Street School. Tower Street closed as an elementary school that year and is now a community center. Tower Street School was torn down in summer 2025.

The 2020s brought several other changes to the district. After a vote passed in 2022, the demolition and reconstruction of State Street Elementary has gone underway, with the construction that started in 2024 yet to be complete. The vote in 2022 also led to further renovations for Springbrook and Dunns Corners Elementary. Following the 2024-25 school year, the math and world language departments and classrooms were moved from Babcock to Ward with the rest of the common core subjects. In 2017, Bradford Elementary closed, and in 2022, was demolished. Less and less people have graduating out of Westerly High School in recent years, as many students have gone to other high schools like Chariho, a trade school. To keep up, Westerly has implemented Career and Tech Education classes that are optional to take. Medical pathways, construction, and criminal justice are located in Ward while cosmology, fine arts and culinary are located in Babcock.

== Principals ==
- Osceola Kile: 1870–1872
- George Hursey: Interim, Fall 1872
- James Patterson: Interim, Spring 1873
- N.W. Widdifield: 1873–1874
- J.M.E. Drake: 1874–1876
- Sidney B. Frost: 1876–1878
- T.D. Adams: 1878–1882
- Eliel S. Ball: 1882–1886
- Everett C. Willard: 1886–1891
- E.H. Rice: 1891–1892
- Walter R. Whittle: 1892–1902
- Ambrose Warren: 1902–1903
- No record: 1903–1908
- John Swain: 1908–1911
- Gibeon Bradbury: 1911–1912
- Willard Bacon: 1912–1914
- Alfred Maryott: 1914–1915
- I.R. Sheldon: 1915–1917
- No record: 1917–1923
- Laura McIntire: 1923–1925
- Charles Mason: 1925–1952
- Hollice Stevens: 1952–1966
- Gerald Dunn: 1966–1981
- Albert Ferraro: 1981–1989
- Warren LeValley: 1989–1990
- Paul Lombardi: Interim, 1990–1991
- Betty Phillips: Fall 1991–January 1992
- Andrew Carrano: Interim, January–March 1992
- J. Richard Silva: Interim, March–June 1992
- Walter Gibson: 1992–1996
- James Diprete: Interim, 1996–1997
- Salvatore Augeri: Interim, Spring 1997
- James Murano: 1997–2003
- Paula Fusco (Dinoto): 2003–2011
- Steven S. Ruscito: 2011–2015
- Todd Grimes: 2015–2018
- Michael Hobin: 2018–2023
- James Murano: May 2023-July 2023 (interim)
- Kellie Moulin: July 2023 – present

== Student activities ==
=== Organizations and activities ===
- Academic Decathlon
- The Barker (Student Newspaper)
- Big Buddies
- Bowling Club
- Bulldog Book Club
- Character Education Committee
- Chemistry Team
- Chess Club
- Future Business Leaders of America
- Film Club
- French Club
- Friends of Rachel Club
- Gay Straight Alliance
- Ink Bandits (Creative Writing Club)
- International Club
- Marching band
- Color Guard
- Dance Line
- Math Team
- National/Rhode Island Honor Society
- Outdoors Club
- Pep Club
- Robotics Club
- Students Against Destructive Decisions (SADD)
- Science Olympiad
- SkillsUSA
- Stage Dogs (Drama Club)
- Student Council
- Students as Mediators

=== Athletics ===
- Baseball (Boys)
- Basketball (Boys)
- Basketball (Freshmen)
- Basketball (Girls)
- Basketball (Unified)
- Cheerleading
- Dance Team (basketball)
- Football
- Golf
- Indoor Track & Field (Boys and Girls)
- Lacrosse 2015 Division III RI State Champions
- Soccer
- Softball
- Swim Team (Boys and Girls)
- Tennis
- Track and Field (Boys and Girls)
- Volleyball (Boys and Girls)
- Volleyball (Unified)
- Wrestling

=== Music ===
The music program consists of a variety of courses including both academic as well as performing ensembles. Performing ensembles include: Chorus, Concert Band, Marching Band, and Jazz Band.

== Notable alumni ==
- George Greer – Baseball coach
- George Greeley – Pianist, composer, conductor, arranger, and record producer
- Don Wise – Tenor saxophonist and music producer
