= UConn Huskies football =

College football team

2026 UConn Huskies football team
- First season: 1896; 130 years ago
- Athletic director: David Benedict
- Head coach: Jason Candle; 1st season, 2–1 (.667)
- Location: East Hartford, Connecticut
- Stadium: Pratt & Whitney Stadium at Rentschler Field (capacity: 40,000)
- NCAA division: Division I FBS
- Conference: Independent
- Colors: National flag blue and white
- All-time record: 539–616–38 (.468)
- Bowl record: 4–5 (.444)

Conference championships
- ALNESC: 1901 New England: 1924, 1926, 1928, 1936, 1937, 1942, 1945, 1946 Yankee: 1949, 1952, 1956, 1957, 1958, 1959, 1960, 1968, 1970, 1971, 1973, 1982, 1983, 1986, 1989 Big East: 2007, 2010

Division championships
- A-10 New England: 1998
- Consensus All-Americans: 1
- Rivalries: UMass (rivalry); Rhode Island (rivalry); UCF (rivalry); Syracuse (rivalry)
- Fight song: UConn Husky
- Mascot: Jonathan
- Marching band: The Pride of Connecticut
- Outfitter: Nike
- Website: UConnHuskies.com

The UConn Huskies football team is a college football team that represents the University of Connecticut in the sport of American football. The team competes in NCAA Division I FBS as an independent. Connecticut first fielded a team in 1896 and participated in Division I-AA until 1999. The Huskies began their two-year Division I-A transition period in 2000 and became a full-fledged Division I-A team in 2002. From 2000 to 2003, the team played as an independent. The school's football team then joined the conference of its other sport teams, the Big East (later named the American Athletic Conference in 2013, and now known as the American Conference), taking effect in 2004, through 2019. In 2019, the UConn football team left the American to again play as an independent, as the school's current primary conference, the current Big East, does not sponsor the sport. The Huskies were most recently coached by Jim Mora prior to his resignation after the 2025 regular season to fill the head coaching vacancy at Colorado State. Gordon Sammis served as interim head coach for the Huskies' 2025 bowl game, with Jason Candle taking over for 2026.

== History ==
=== Early years ===
The University of Connecticut began playing football in 1896 when the school was known as Storrs Agricultural College, and the team was known as the "Aggies". It teamed up with Massachusetts Agricultural College and the Rhode Island College of Agriculture and the Mechanic Arts to form the Athletic League of New England State Colleges for the purpose of scheduling football matchups between the schools. The first year was spent playing against local high schools and YMCA clubs. The following year provided their first competition against future rivals Rhode Island, an opponent that would be played over 100 times, and Massachusetts. Other early rivals included the Ivy League and the "Little Ivies", particularly Yale University starting in 1948, who have played the Huskies for 50 years.

Tragedy struck the team on September 27, 1919, when Gardner Dow died from injuries related to a flying tackle that he delivered in a game against New Hampshire. The college would honor Dow by naming the athletic fields after him. These fields would become the home for most of the school's athletic teams for the next three decades.

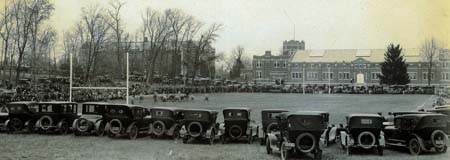
The football team plays on Gardner Dow Athletic Fields in 1920.

In 1924, the Aggies celebrated their first undefeated season when they finished with six wins, no losses and two ties. The defense was the strength of the team, as they allowed a meager thirteen points to be scored against them over the entire season, including a total of three points over the final seven games. The team was proclaimed by The New York Times to be among the best in the country, and was led by the school's first All-America candidate in captain, Martin "Red" O'Neill.

The UConn Club memorializes O'Neill with a yearly award given to a former student-athlete who has had a successful professional career.

Red O'Neill went on to become one of Connecticut's first players to play in the NFL. He played for the Hartford Blues in 1926, their only year in the NFL. Another player is Art "Pop" Williams, winning a championship with the Providence Steam Roller in 1928 and also has the record for the most rushing career touchdowns in Providence's franchise history. The Steam Roller are New England's first NFL champion.

The renamed Huskies went on to become long-time members of the Yankee Conference, winning 15 conference championships.

In 2012, Bill Belichick stated in an interview on WEEI that in 1983 he applied for the Huskies' head coaching position but was eventually turned down in favor of an internal hire, Tom Jackson.

=== Transition to Division I-A ===
Connecticut hired Lew Perkins as its athletic director in 1990. One of Perkins' first projects was to gather facts for a possible upgrade of the football program to Division I-A. Perkins feared that if the university did not upgrade the football program, that it ran the risk of falling behind other institutions that fielded both football and basketball teams at the highest level. However, UConn was in the middle of a budget deficit, and many faculty feared that an upgrade of the football program would result in a loosening of academic standards.

=== First Randy Edsall era (1999–2010) ===
Randy Edsall was named the 27th head football coach at the University of Connecticut on December 21, 1998, and led the Huskies from Division I-AA into Division I-A. UConn officially began the upgrade process in January 1999 by applying to join the Big East football conference. They would receive a special waiver from the NCAA in order to play in Memorial Stadium while Rentschler Field was under construction. UConn would become the first school to ever move from the FCS to the Football Bowl Subdivision as a member of the Big East after three years as an independent. The Huskies would spend the 2000 and 2001 as a transitional Division I-A program as they built their scholarship base to the maximum of 85. They recorded their first win over a Division I-A opponent on September 18, 1999, when they defeated Buffalo, 23–0. They would finish the 1999 season with a final record of 4–7 and the following 2000 season at 3–8.

The 2001 season brought their first win over a BCS rival with a victory over Rutgers on September 29, by a score of 20–19. The growing pains continued, as they finished the season at 2–9.

The breakthrough came during the Huskies' first year as a full-fledged member of Division I-A in 2002. Led by sophomore quarterback Dan Orlovsky, they showed vast improvement over the previous two seasons, despite starting the season losing six of the first eight games. They closed Memorial Stadium in fashion by routing the last two opponents, Florida Atlantic and Kent State, by a combined score of 124–35. The 63 points scored against Kent State in the Memorial Stadium finale were the most the Huskies ever scored in the 50 years of playing in the stadium. They concluded a successful season by defeating Navy, 38–0, and Iowa State, 37–20. The victory over Iowa State was the Huskies' first win over a bowl-bound team.

Connecticut was originally scheduled to join the Big East as a football member in 2005. However, following the departure of Miami, Virginia Tech, the Huskies' entrance into the Big East was expedited by one year. Boston College would leave the Big East at the conclusion of the 2004 season.

The success continued in 2003, when Connecticut began play in Rentschler Field. They would finish the season with an overall record of 9–3. They opened the season with their first victory vs. a Big Ten team (34–10 over Indiana) and the final game of the season provided their first victory over an ACC opponent, when they defeated Wake Forest, 51–17. It was only the third time that a non-conference team had scored over 50 points in an ACC stadium. Despite the stellar record, the Huskies were not invited to play in a bowl game, largely due to their lack of conference affiliation.

The Huskies played their first Big East conference game on September 17, 2004, when they dropped a 27–7 decision at Boston College. Their first Big East conference win came only 13 days later, when they defeated Pittsburgh 29–17. They completed their first season in the conference in 5th place with a record of 3–3. That year's overall record of 8–4 was enough to garner an invitation to the 2004 Motor City Bowl, the first bowl invitation in the school's history. The attendance of 52,552 was, at the time, a record crowd for the Bowl.

The Huskies were hit hard by graduation and injuries in the 2005 and 2006 seasons. The program opened one of the best and newest college football facilities in 2006 with the completion of the $57.9 million (165,000 sq. ft.) Burton Family Football Complex & Mark R. Shenkman Training Center.

The 2007 season saw a quick turnaround with the Huskies' first-ever Big East Conference football title, which they shared with West Virginia. For the first time, UConn beat a ranked opponent at home, defeating South Florida 22–15. UConn participated in the Meineke Car Care Bowl, losing to Wake Forest 24–10.

That was followed up with consecutive 8–5 seasons in 2008 and 2009 with wins in both of their bowl games (over Buffalo and the SEC's South Carolina).

The team was hit hard in 2009 by the on-campus murder of junior cornerback Jasper Howard, who was stabbed by a non-student outside a dance following their homecoming game win over Louisville. UConn struggled following his death, dropping their next three games and falling to 1–4 in-conference, but got a major win to break the streak at Notre Dame, a victory quoted by Coach Randy Edsall as being the program's "Best Win". The game ball from that victory was sent to Howard's mother in Miami, one of many tributes throughout the year for the fallen player. The team honored Howard prior to every game through the 2010 season, which would have been his senior year.

The 2010 season brought a second Big East Championship in four years and a trip to the 2011 Fiesta Bowl. After a loss in the Fiesta Bowl to Oklahoma, Edsall did not fly home with or tell his players that he was leaving the UConn football program. He instead took a separate flight to Maryland to become their new head coach. It had also been noted in the media that Edsall's relationship with then-athletic director Jeff Hathaway had been strained for several years.

=== Paul Pasqualoni era (2011–2013) ===
Two weeks after Edsall left for Maryland and after nearly seven years away from college football, Connecticut native Paul Pasqualoni was hired away as defensive coordinator from the Dallas Cowboys to lead the UConn football program, by the soon to be dismissed AD Hathaway.

The Big East's name changed in 2013 to the American Athletic Conference as a result of the non-FBS split that took place as part of the conference's three-way realignment between 2010 and 2013. Three members moved to the ACC as full members, Notre Dame went to the ACC as a partial, Rutgers to the Big Ten and West Virginia to the Big 12. With the seven non-FBS basketball schools buying the Big East conference name for their own newly formed conference. Two teams departing to the ACC, Syracuse and Pittsburgh left the Big East with losing records against the Huskies in football.

Following two seasons of mediocrity and a struggling offense, Pasqualoni was forced to replace his lifelong colleague George DeLeone as the offensive coordinator, just as he did prior to them both being fired at Syracuse. Pasqualoni named T. J. Weist as his OC for 2013. But Pasqualoni and Deleone (now his OL coach) were both fired after starting 0–4 with UConn's first loss as full D-I member to an FCS team, Towson 33–18 and following a humiliating defeat to Buffalo (41–12), which UConn had never lost to (8–0) as an FBS team. Weist was named the interim head coach and finished the season strong on a 3-game winning streak after starting out 0–5 and totally revamping the offense free of Pasqualoni's control.

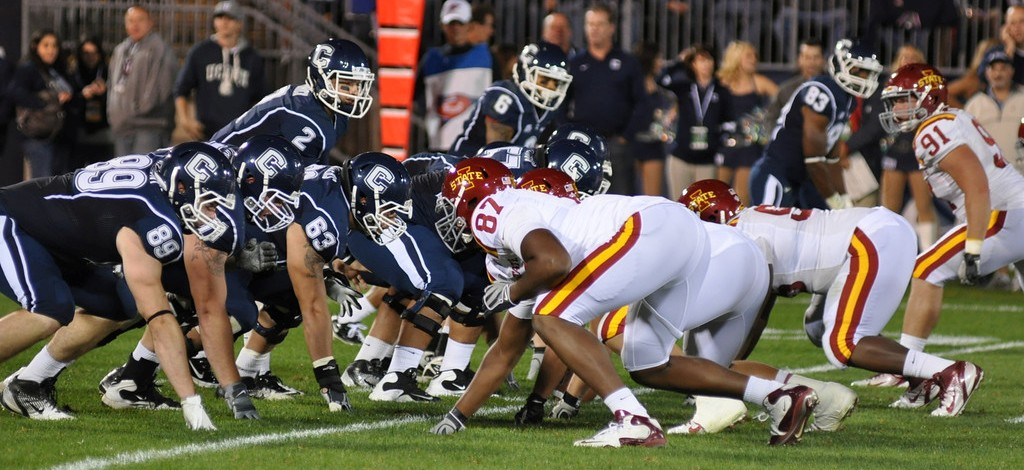
UConn lining up against Iowa State in 2011

=== Bob Diaco era (2014–2016) ===
Though Weist was considered for the head coaching job, UConn AD Warde Manuel announced Notre Dame defensive coordinator and Broyles Award winner Bob Diaco as the new UConn head coach for the 2014 season. After a complete tear down of the program in 2014, which would lead to Diaco finishing the year with only around 60 scholarship players available and needing to use a dozen true freshmen, the team finished 2–10.

The 2015 season resulted in a revitalization for the program as they finished 6–6 and became bowl-eligible for the first time since the 2010 season.

On December 26, 2016, UConn announced that Diaco, who posted his 3rd straight losing year with a 3–9 record, would be fired effective January 2, 2017. By not making the move immediately, the school saved $1.6 million in buyout expenses. He was replaced by former coach Edsall, making his return to the program after six years.

=== Second Randy Edsall era (2017–2021) ===
Following a 3–9 third season with the Huskies, Diaco was terminated at the end of the 2016 season. His replacement, Randy Edsall, returning to the program after six years, would not find similar success in his second go-around. In 2019, after several years of losing records with a $41 million sports created deficit, UConn made the choice to leave the AAC and rejoin the current edition of the Big East. This was seemingly a basketball move because the Big East does not have football. The path would be to play as an independent.

The UConn football team left the American and became independent in August 2020 as a result of UConn's other sports rejoining the Big East, which does not sponsor football. UConn cancelled their 2020 season due to the COVID-19 pandemic. Their first season competing independently was in 2021. After three straight losing campaigns and a season cancelled by the COVID-19 pandemic in 2020, Edsall elected to retire after a 0–2 start in 2021.

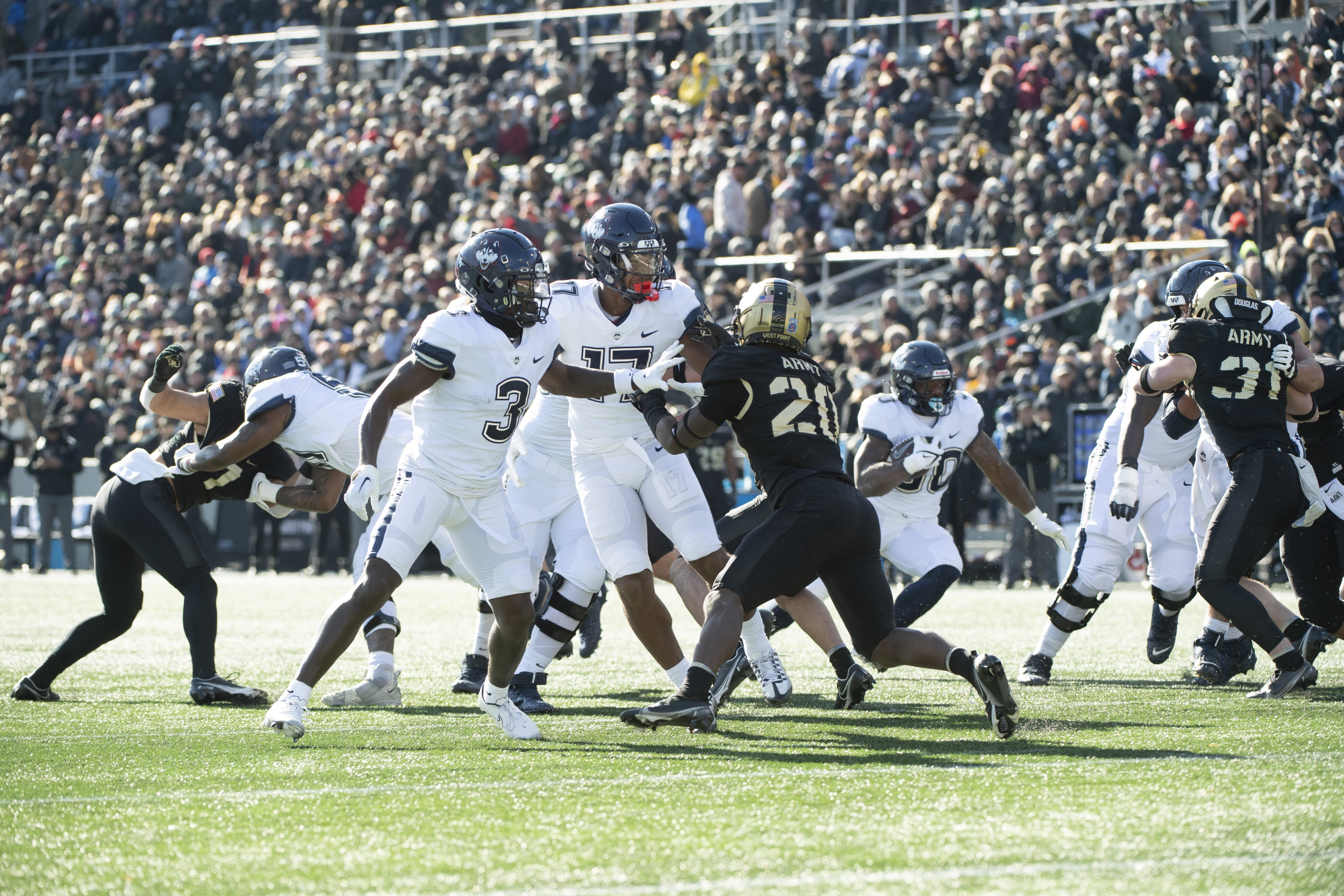
UConn vs Army in 2022

=== Jim Mora era (2022–2025) ===
To replace Edsall, UConn hired Jim L. Mora. In his first season with the team, Mora would lead the Huskies to a surprising 6–6 regular season record, highlighted by an upset victory over then-No. 19 Liberty. Bowl-eligible for the first time since 2015, UConn was selected to play in the 2022 Myrtle Beach Bowl against Marshall, in a rematch of their last bowl game. In the 2024 season, UConn had an 8–4 record, their first winning season since 2010. They were invited to compete in the Fenway Bowl against North Carolina. They would go on to defeat North Carolina in a 27–14 victory to win their first bowl game since 2009.

On November 26, 2025, it was announced Mora would depart from the program to head coach at Colorado State University.

=== Jason Candle era ===
On December 6, 2025 Jason Candle was hired to replace Jim Mora as head coach.

== Academics ==
In 2010, Connecticut had 16 players named to the Big East All-Academic Football Team, an honor which requires a cumulative Grade Point Average (GPA) of at least a 3.0 in a minimum of two semesters. And several times UConn was ranked as one of the top bowl teams in the country per the annual Graduation Gap Bowl report. In 2015, the team was honored by AF Coaches Assoc. for academic achievement, and the 990 single-year APR score in 2014–15 under head coach Diaco was also the highest in school history.

== Conference affiliations ==
- Independent (1896)
- Athletic League of New England State Colleges (1897–1922)
- New England Conference (1923–1946)
- Yankee Conference (1947–1996)
- Atlantic 10 Conference (1997–1999)
- NCAA Division I FBS independent (2000–2003, 2020–present)
- Big East Conference (2004–2012)
- American Athletic Conference (2013–2019)

== Postseason appearances ==
=== Division I-AA playoffs ===
Season	Coach	Playoff	Opponent	Result
1998	Skip Holtz	First round Quarterfinals	Hampton; Georgia Southern	W 42–34; L 52–30

=== Bowl games ===
Connecticut has participated in nine bowl games, with the Huskies garnering a record of 4–5.

Season	Coach	Bowl	Opponent	Result
2004	Randy Edsall	Motor City Bowl	Toledo	W 39–10
2007	Randy Edsall	Meineke Car Care Bowl	Wake Forest	L 10–24
2008	Randy Edsall	International Bowl	Buffalo	W 38–20
2009	Randy Edsall	PapaJohns.com Bowl	South Carolina	W 20–7
2010	Randy Edsall	Fiesta Bowl †	Oklahoma	L 20–48
2015	Bob Diaco	St. Petersburg Bowl	Marshall	L 10–16
2022	Jim L. Mora	Myrtle Beach Bowl	Marshall	L 14–28
2024	Jim L. Mora	Fenway Bowl	North Carolina	W 27–14
2025	Gordon Sammis (interim)	Fenway Bowl	Army	L 16–41

† BCS Bowl

== Championships ==
=== Conference championships ===
Connecticut has won 26 conference championships, 17 shared and 9 outright.

Season	Coach	Conference	Overall record	Conference record
1901	T. D. Knowles	Athletic League of New England State Colleges	8–2	1–0
1924	Sumner Dole	New England Conference	6–0–2	3–0
1926	Sumner Dole	New England Conference	7–1	2–1
1928†	Sumner Dole	New England Conference	4–1–3	1–0–2
1936	J. Orlean Christian	New England Conference	7–2	2–0
1937†	J. Orlean Christian	New England Conference	6–2–1	1–0
1942†	J. Orlean Christian	New England Conference	6–2	2–0
1945†	J. Orlean Christian	New England Conference	7–1	2–0
1946†	J. Orlean Christian	New England Conference	4–3–1	2–0–1
1949†	J. Orlean Christian	Yankee Conference	4–4–1	2–0–1
1952†	Robert Ingalls	Yankee Conference	5–3	2–1
1956	Robert Ingalls	Yankee Conference	6–2–1	3–0–1
1957†	Robert Ingalls	Yankee Conference	5–4–1	3–0–1
1958	Robert Ingalls	Yankee Conference	7–3	4–0
1959	Robert Ingalls	Yankee Conference	6–3	4–0
1960†	Robert Ingalls	Yankee Conference	5–4	3–1
1968†	John Toner	Yankee Conference	4–6	4–1
1970	John Toner	Yankee Conference	4–4–2	4–0–1
1971†	Robert Casciola	Yankee Conference	5–3–1	4–1–1
1973	Larry Naviaux	Yankee Conference	8–2–1	5–0–1
1982†	Walt Nadzak	Yankee Conference	5–6	3–2
1983†	Tom Jackson	Yankee Conference	5–6	4–1
1986†	Tom Jackson	Yankee Conference	8–3	5–2
1989†	Tom Jackson	Yankee Conference	8–3	6–2
2007†	Randy Edsall	Big East	9–4	5–2
2010†	Randy Edsall	Big East	8–5	5–2

† Co-champions

=== Division championships ===
The Huskies have won one division title, which they shared with UMass.

Season	Coach	Division	Overall record	Conference record
1998 †	Skip Holtz	Atlantic 10 New England	10–3	6–2

† Co-champions

== Rivalries ==
=== Massachusetts ===
The Yankee Conference rivalry dates back to 1897. The rivalry became dormant in 1999 as UConn moved up to the FBS and UMass remained at the FCS level. The rivalry would be revived in UMass's FBS debut, a 37–0 win for the Huskies. Since 2018, UConn has won four out of the six contests.

=== Syracuse ===
Better known for their men's basketball rivalry, the football rivalry between UConn and Syracuse dates back to 2004 and has been played 12 times. The teams were members of the old Big East until Syracuse left in 2012 to join the Atlantic Coast Conference (ACC) in all sports. Since becoming a non-conference matchup, the game has been played intermittently with the next meeting coming in 2026.

=== Rhode Island ===
The football rivalry dates back to 1897 and was centered around the Ramnapping Trophy after UConn students stole the URI mascot in 1934. The teams played nearly every year until the end of the Yankee Conference. Once UConn moved up to the FBS, the teams seldom play as Rhode Island remains an FCS program. Since 2000, there have been only three meetings: a UConn (52–7) win in 2006, a UConn (52–10) win in 2009, and a back-and-forth 56–49 UConn victory in 2018.

== Facilities ==
=== Pratt & Whitney Stadium at Rentschler Field ===
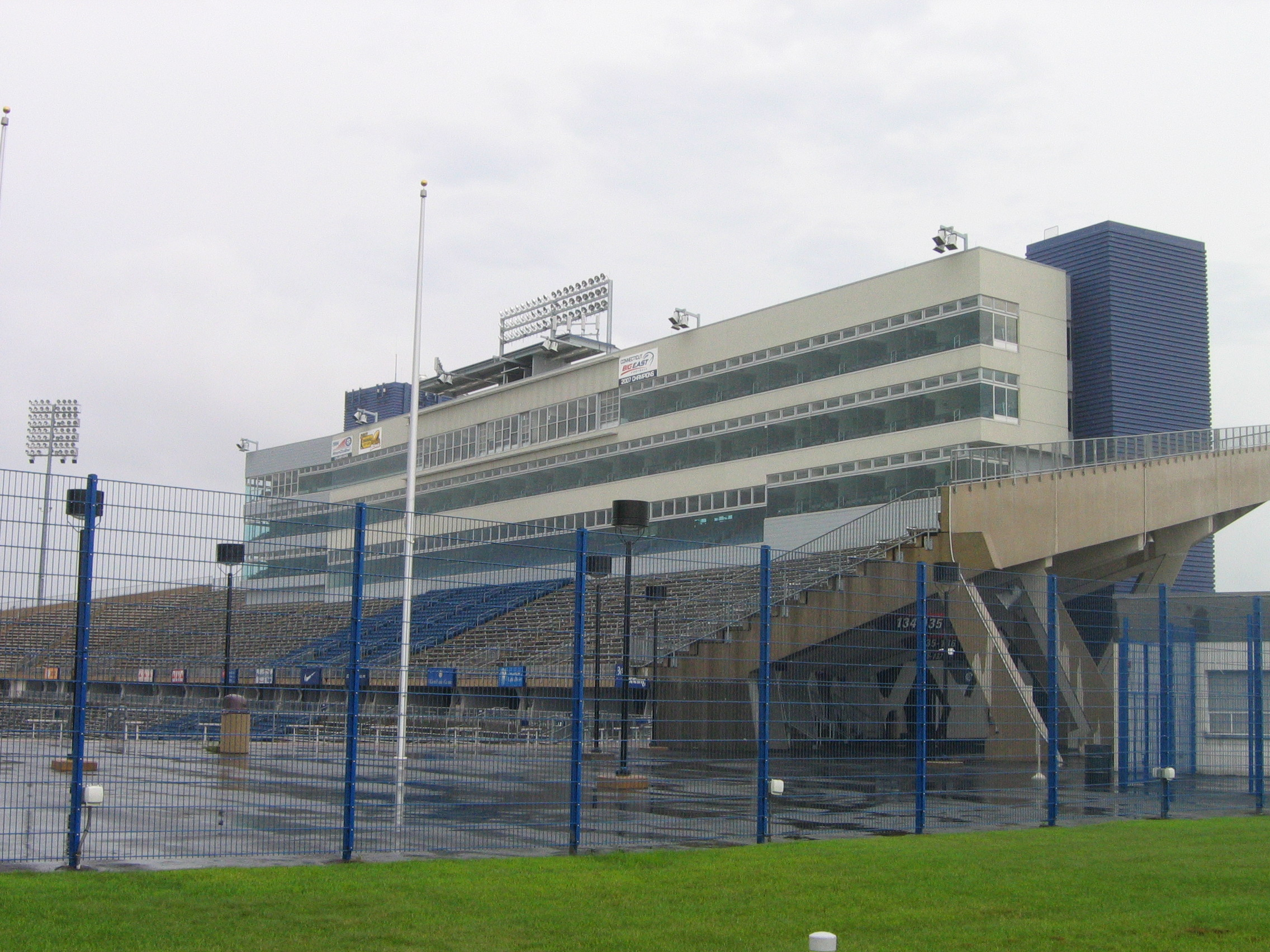
Press box at Rentschler Field in 2008

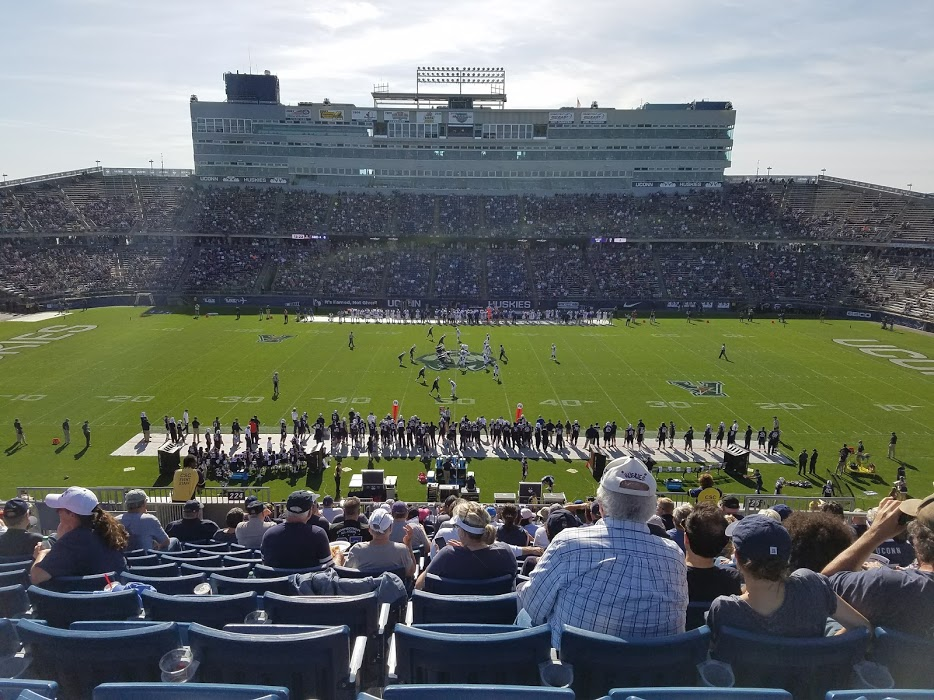
Rentschler Field in 2017

In 1997, the Big East Conference gave the University of Connecticut and Villanova University a December 31 deadline to decide if they were going to upgrade their respective football programs and join the Big East football conference. Villanova, a private institution, declined the invitation. However, in October 1997, the University of Connecticut Board of Trustees overwhelmingly endorsed, by a vote of sixteen to one, the football team's plan to upgrade the program to Division I-A status. Part of the plan would be to build a new stadium, as the current stadium, Memorial Stadium, fell well below the minimum occupancy level of 30,000, as set by the NCAA. Originally, the new stadium was to be built on campus.

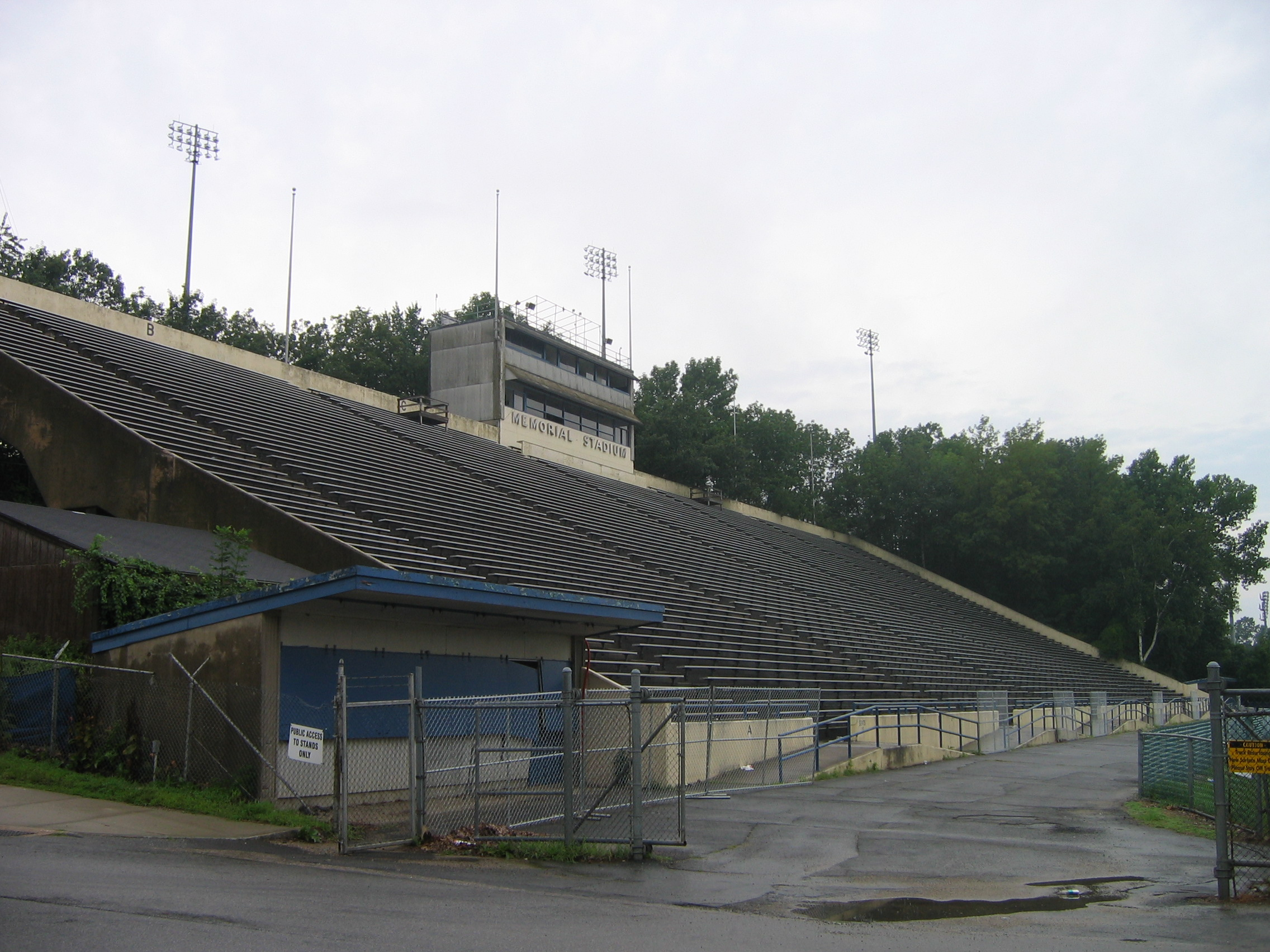
UConn would be granted an attendance waiver by the NCAA in order to play its home games at Memorial Stadium in Storrs during the 2000–2002 seasons.

However, the enthusiasm toward the new stadium quickly faded as the estimated expenses rose, the idea of an on-campus stadium was tabled, and the upgrade of the program was put on hold by the Connecticut state legislature. A year later, the stadium issue was rehashed during an attempt to bring the New England Patriots to Hartford, Connecticut. A proposed 70,000 seat, open-air stadium in downtown Hartford would also serve as the home of the Huskies football team. The plans for this stadium also fell through and the Patriots announced that they would remain in Foxboro, Massachusetts. Eventually, a new site emerged across the Connecticut River in East Hartford, when Pratt & Whitney donated land on the old Rentschler Airfield to the state for purposes of building an off-campus football stadium which is 20 miles away from the main campus.

The Huskies play their home football games at Pratt & Whitney Stadium at Rentschler Field in East Hartford, Connecticut, an off-campus facility located 20 miles (32 km) to the west of the main campus and only 3 miles east of the new Downtown Hartford-Uconn campus. The inaugural game took place on August 30, 2003, when Connecticut defeated the Indiana Hoosiers 34–10. Since the opening, Connecticut has enjoyed a decided home field advantage, posting a 74–60 record when playing at Rentschler. In 2007, the Huskies completed their home season winning each of their seven home games, becoming only the second Big East team to compile a 7–0 home record. The stadium played to an average of 97% near capacity crowds for eight years (2003–2010), prior to Paul Pasqualoni's arrival and during the Big East.

=== Burton Family Football Complex ===
The Huskies on-campus home is at the Burton Family Football Complex on Stadium Road in Storrs, Connecticut. It contains the coaches' offices, team meeting rooms, video facilities, dining hall and student-athlete lounge. Construction began in the fall of 2004 and it officially opened in July 2006. The building is named after Robert Burton, who in 2002 made a donation of $2.5 million to the University of Connecticut. The original location of the building was to be where Memorial Stadium stands. However, it was later decided to construct the building across the street.

=== Mark R. Shenkman Training Center ===
Alongside the Burton Family Football Complex is the 85,000-square-foot (7,900 m^{2}) Mark R. Shenkman Training Center. The indoor training center includes a full-length football field and an 18,000-square-foot (1,700 m^{2}) strength and conditioning center. The training center was made possible by a $2.5 million gift from Connecticut businessman and UConn alum Mark Shenkman. Construction of the Mark R. Shenkman Training Center and the Burton Family Football Complex were handled in tandem by HOK Sport (now Populous) and JCJ Architecture. Upon completion in the summer of 2006, both buildings were granted a LEED silver designation. They are the first buildings on the University of Connecticut campus, and the first football facilities in the nation to be certified as a "green building."

== Records ==
=== Record vs. Big East teams ===
Official record against all former Big East teams (2004–12):

Opponent	Won	Lost	Percentage	All Time	Streak	First	Last
Boston College	0	1	.000	2–13–2	Won 1	1908	2025
Cincinnati	2	6	.250	3–13	Lost 3	2001	2019
Louisville	4	4	.500	4–6	Lost 1	2000	2013
Pittsburgh	5	4	.556	5–4	Won 1	2004	2012
Rutgers	3	6	.333	11–22	Won 1	1940	2013
South Florida	5	3	.625	5–13	Lost 9	2000	2023
Syracuse	6	3	.667	6–9	Lost 7	2004	2026
Temple	1	1	.500	8–14	Won 2	1963	2026
West Virginia	1	7	.125	1–7	Lost 1	2004	2011
Totals	27	35	.435				

=== Record vs. American Conference teams ===
Official record against all American Conference opponents (2013–2019): Teams no longer in the American are in italics.

Opponent	Won	Lost	Percentage	All Time	Streak	First	Last
Cincinnati	1	6	.143	3–13	Lost 3	2001	2019
East Carolina	1	5	.167	1–5	Lost 4	2014	2019
Houston	1	2	.333	1–3	Lost 3	2015	2021
Louisville	0	1	.000	4–6	Lost 1	2000	2013
Memphis	1	3	.250	1–3	Lost 3	2013	2018
Navy	0	3	.000	1–9	Lost 4	1975	2019
Rutgers	1	0	1.000	11–22	Won 1	1940	2013
SMU	0	4	.000	0–5	Lost 5	1989	2018
South Florida	0	7	.000	5–13	Lost 9	2000	2023
Temple	2	5	.286	8–14	Won 2	1963	2026
Tulane	1	3	.250	1–3	Lost 2	2014	2019
Tulsa	1	1	.500	1–1	Lost 1	2017	2018
UCF	2	5	.286	2–6	Lost 5	2013	2021
Totals	11	45	.196				

=== Record vs. Independent teams ===
Opponent	Won	Lost	Percentage	All Time	Streak	First	Last
Notre Dame	1	0	1.000	1–0	Won 1	2009	2009

== Notable alumni and personnel ==
=== Current NFL players ===
Player	Position	Team	First year	Draft round
Skyler Bell	WR	Buffalo Bills	2026	4
Nate Carter	QB	Kansas City Chiefs	2025	Undrafted
Joe Fagnano	QB	Baltimore Ravens	2026	Undrafted
Folorunso Fatukasi	DT	Las Vegas Raiders	2018	6
Christian Haynes	OG	Seattle Seahawks	2024	3
Travis Jones	DT	Baltimore Ravens	2022	3
Chase Lundt	OT	Buffalo Bills	2025	6
Matt Peart	OT	Denver Broncos	2020	3
Valentin Senn	OT	Arizona Cardinals	2025	Undrafted
Ryan Van Demark	OT	Minnesota Vikings	2022	Undrafted
Eric Watts	DE	Miami Dolphins	2024	Undrafted

=== Current UFL players ===
Player	Position	Team
Jamar Summers	CB	Arlington Renegades

=== Former NFL players ===
Player	Position	1st year	Draft round	Teams
Andrew Adams	S	2016		New York Giants, Tampa Bay Buccaneers, Tennessee Titans, and Baltimore Ravens
Deon Anderson	FB	2007		Dallas Cowboys and Miami Dolphins
Glen Antrum	WR	1989		New England Patriots
William Beatty	OT	2009	2	New York Giants and Philadelphia Eagles
Tim Boyle	QB	2018		Green Bay Packers, Detroit Lions, Chicago Bears, New York Jets, Houston Texans, Miami Dolphins, New York Giants, Tennessee Titans
Tyvon Branch	S	2008	4	Oakland Raiders, Kansas City Chiefs, and Arizona Cardinals
Donald Brown	RB	2009	1	Indianapolis Colts, San Diego Chargers, and New England Patriots
Cody Brown	LB	2009		Arizona Cardinals and New York Jets
Darius Butler	CB	2009	2	
Vince Clements	RB	1972	4	New York Giants
John Contoulis	DT	1963	4	New York Giants
Bill Cooke	DE	1975		Green Bay Packers, San Francisco 49ers, Detroit Lions, and Seattle Seahawks
Tyler Davis	TE	2020		Jacksonville Jaguars and Green Bay Packers
Mark Didio	WR	1992		Pittsburgh Steelers
Marcus Easley	WR	2010	4	Buffalo Bills
Alfred Fincher	LB	2005	3	New Orleans Saints and Washington Redskins
Nick Giaquinto	RB	1980		Miami Dolphins and Washington Redskins
Dwayne Gratz	CB	2013	3	Philadelphia Eagles
Ryan Griffin	TE	2013		Houston Texans, New York Jets, and Chicago Bears
James "Ching" Hammill	QB	1925		Providence Steam Roller
Brian Herosian	DB	1973		Baltimore Colts
Andreas Knappe	OT	2017		Atlanta Falcons, Washington Redskins, Indianapolis Colts, and Denver Broncos
Brian Kozlowski	TE	1993		New York Giants, Atlanta Falcons and Washington Redskins
Matt Lawrence	RB	2008		Baltimore Ravens
Bob Leahy	QB	1971		Pittsburgh Steelers
Greg Lloyd, Jr.	LB	2011		Philadelphia Eagles, Indianapolis Colts and Buffalo Bills
Tyler Lorenzen	TE	2009		New Orleans Saints
Booth Lusteg	K	1966		Buffalo Bills, Miami Dolphins, Pittsburgh Steelers and Green Bay Packers
Scott Lutrus	LB	2011		Indianapolis Colts
Eric Naposki	LB	1988		New England Patriots and Indianapolis Colts
Red O'Neil	C	1926		Hartford Blues
Dan Orlovsky	QB	2005	5	Detroit Lions, Houston Texans, Indianapolis Colts, Tampa Bay Buccaneers, Detroit Lions, Los Angeles Rams
Vic Radzievitch	back	1926		Hartford Blues
Kendall Reyes	DE	2012	2	San Diego Chargers, Washington Redskins, Kansas City Chiefs, and New York Jets
Pete Rostosky	T	1984		Pittsburgh Steelers
Anthony Sherman	FB	2011	5	Arizona Cardinals, and Kansas City Chiefs
Michael Smith	WR	2013		Houston Texans
Donald Thomas	G	2008	6	Miami Dolphins, Detroit Lions, New England Patriots, Indianapolis Colts
Jordan Todman	RB	2011	6	San Diego Chargers, Minnesota Vikings, Jacksonville Jaguars, Carolina Panthers, Pittsburgh Steelers, Indianapolis Colts, New York Jets, Houston Texans
Eric Torkelson	RB	1974	11	Green Bay Packers
Art "Pop" Williams	RB	1928		Providence Steam Roller
Darrell Wilson	DB	1981		New England Patriots
Lawrence Wilson	LB	2011	6	Carolina Panthers, Tennessee Titans, New Orleans Saints, and Chicago Bears

=== Former personnel ===
- Robert Casciola – head coach; vice president and chief operating officer of the New Jersey Nets between 1987 and 1991
- Rick Forzano – head coach; head coach for the Detroit Lions between 1974 and 1976
- Leo Hafford – head coach; pitched for the 1906 Cincinnati Reds
- Lou Holtz – Hall of Fame coach; assistant coach; national champion as head coach at Notre Dame in 1988
- Skip Holtz – head coach and also former head coach at the University of South Florida; current head coach, Birmingham Stallions
- D. Robert Ingalls – head coach; center for the 1942 Green Bay Packers
- Paul Pasqualoni – head coach and also former head coach at Syracuse University; winningest coach in Big East history
- Sam Rutigliano – assistant coach; head coach for the Cleveland Browns between 1978 and 1984
- Edwin O. Smith – head coach; member of the Connecticut House of Representatives between 1933 and 1960
- John Toner – head coach; president of the NCAA between 1983 and 1985
- Arthur Valpey – head coach; assistant coach for the 1947 national champions, the Michigan Wolverines

== Individual accomplishments ==
=== Brian Kozlowski Award ===
The Brian Kozlowski Award was first awarded in 1998. It honors the former UConn Husky and former New York Giants, Atlanta Falcons, and Washington Redskins tight end, Brian Kozlowski, who through hard work, effort and dedication has been able to have a lengthy NFL career.

Year	Recipients
2001	Jamie Lenkaitis
2002	Wes Timko
2003	Sean Mulcahy
2004	Ryan Krug
2005	Taurien Sowell
2006	Matt Applebaum, Matt Nuzie
2007	Larry Taylor
2008	Julius Williams
2009	Robert McClain
2010	Anthony Sherman
2011	Twyon Martin
2012	Dwayne Gratz
2013	Jesse Joseph
2014	Graham Stewart
2015	Luke Carrezola
2016	Luke Carrezola
2018	Aaron McLean

=== Individual awards ===
==== Players ====
- Gridiron Club of Greater Boston Bulger Lowe Award

Joe Fagnano (2025)

- Consensus All Americans

Skyler Bell (2025)

==== Coaches ====
- Gridiron Club of Greater Boston Head Coach of the Year

Randy Edsall (2010)
Jim L. Mora (2024)

- Gridiron Club of Greater Boston Assistant Coach of the Year

Hank Hughes (2009)

=== Individual conference awards ===
==== Players ====
- Big East Offensive Player of the Year

Donald Brown (2008)
Jordan Todman (2010)

==== Coaches ====
- Big East Coach of the Year

Randy Edsall (2010)

- FBS Independent/PAC12 Coach of the Year

Jim L. Mora (2024)

== Future opponents ==
Announced schedules as of September 23, 2026.

- UConn competes as an FBS Independent.

Week	2027	2028	2029	2030	2031	2032	2033
Week 0							
Week 1	Temple	at South Florida	UMass	at Duke	Boston College		
Week 2	at Duke	Rutgers	at Purdue				
Week 3	at North Carolina	at Wake Forest	at Rutgers	at Boston College		Indiana	
Week 4		Buffalo	Wyoming	Miami (Ohio)			
Week 5	at FIU	at Temple	at Buffalo				
Week 6		Rice	Duke				
Week 7	at UMass						
Week 8		Duke	Boston College				
Week 9	at Pittsburgh	at Old Dominion					
Week 10	Syracuse	Pittsburgh	Southern Miss				
Week 11	at Liberty	at Syracuse					
Week 12	Army						
Week 13	Delaware						Army
Week 14							
