= Rhode Island–UConn football rivalry =

American college football rivalry

- UConn Huskies Rhode Island Rams
- First meeting: October 23, 1897; Storrs 22, Rhode Island 8
- Latest meeting: September 15, 2018; UConn 56, Rhode Island 49
- Next meeting: TBD
- Trophy: Ramnapping Trophy (1936–1999)

Statistics
- Total meetings: 94
- All-time series: UConn leads, 52–34–8
- Trophy series: UConn leads, 40–19–3
- Largest victory: Rhode Island, 51–0 (1909)
- Longest win streak: Rhode Island, 6 (1907–1916); UConn, 6 (1967–1972)
- Longest unbeaten streak: UConn, 10 (1964–1973)
- Current win streak: UConn, 3 (2006–present)

Locations of UConn and URI

The college football rivalry between the University of Connecticut and the University of Rhode Island dates back to the 1890s and was born largely out of proximity, with the schools being less than 60 miles apart. The schools competed in all sports for decades as members of the Yankee Conference. Even though UConn became a charter member of the Big East in 1979, the schools continued to compete in football at the I-AA level as members of the Atlantic 10. The yearly games ended after UConn left the A-10 to move to I-A football in 2000.

In 94 meetings since 1897, UConn leads the series 52–34–8. The schools met at Rentschler Field on September 26, 2009, with UConn winning 52–10. The two teams last met in East Hartford in 2018, where UConn won 56–49.

== Ramnapping Trophy ==
The Ramnapping Trophy was formerly awarded to the winner of the annual football game between the two schools. The name of the trophy originates from a 1930s-era tradition where a few UConn students would go to the URI campus and kidnap (or in this case, "Ramnap") the Rhode Island Ram mascot.

The trophy is topped with a football player standing on a football that is etched with a ram and a husky etched facing one another on a football field. The plaque on the base reads: "Connecticut State v. Rhode Island State Football Series Trophy in Memory of the famous ramnapping of 1934".

The Ramnapping Trophy is on display to the public as part of the J. Robert Donnelly Husky Heritage Sports Museum on the UConn Main Campus in Storrs, Connecticut. The trophy was last brought out during the 1999 game.

== Game results ==
Connecticut victories	Rhode Island victories	Tie games

No.	Date	Location	Winner	Score
1	October 23, 1897	New London, CT	Storrs	22–8
2	November 18, 1899	Storrs, CT	Connecticut	17–0
3	October 21, 1900	Kingston, RI	Connecticut	43–0
4	October 26, 1901	Storrs, CT	Connecticut	27–0
5	November 14, 1903	Kingston, RI	Rhode Island	11–6
6	November 19, 1904	Storrs, CT	Tie	10–10
7	November 23, 1907	Kingston, RI	Rhode Island	42–0
8	November 21, 1908	Storrs, CT	Rhode Island	12–10
9	November 20, 1909	Kingston, RI	Rhode Island	51–0
10	October 29, 1910	Storrs, CT	Rhode Island	33–0
11	October 23, 1915	Storrs, CT	Rhode Island	9–7
12	October 28, 1916	Kingston, RI	Rhode Island	13–6
13	November 22, 1919	Kingston, RI	Connecticut	7–3
14	November 20, 1920	Storrs, CT	Tie	0–0
15	November 19, 1921	Kingston, RI	Rhode Island	27–21
16	November 18, 1922	Storrs, CT	Rhode Island	12–7
17	November 17, 1923	Kingston, RI	Connecticut	7–0
18	November 15, 1924	Storrs, CT	Connecticut	22–0
19	November 14, 1925	Kingston, RI	Tie	0–0
20	November 13, 1926	Storrs, CT	Connecticut	33–0
21	November 12, 1927	Kingston, RI	Rhode Island	12–0
22	November 17, 1928	Storrs, CT	Connecticut	24–0
23	November 16, 1929	Kingston, RI	Rhode Island	19–6
24	November 15, 1930	Storrs, CT	Tie	0–0
25	November 14, 1931	Kingston, RI	Rhode Island	14–0
26	November 12, 1932	Storrs, CT	Tie	19–19
27	November 11, 1933	Kingston, RI	Rhode Island	20–7
28	November 10, 1934	Storrs, CT	Rhode Island	19–0
29	November 9, 1935	Kingston, RI	Rhode Island	7–0
30	November 7, 1936	Storrs, CT	Connecticut	33–0
31	November 6, 1937	Kingston, RI	Connecticut	13–7
32	November 5, 1938	Storrs, CT	Rhode Island	21–20
33	November 11, 1939	Kingston, RI	Connecticut	20–14
34	November 9, 1940	Storrs, CT	Rhode Island	13–12
35	November 8, 1941	Kingston, RI	Rhode Island	6–0
36	November 7, 1942	Storrs, CT	Connecticut	13–6
37	November 9, 1946	Kingston, RI	Connecticut	33–0
38	November 8, 1947	Storrs, CT	Connecticut	23–0
39	November 6, 1948	Kingston, RI	Connecticut	28–6
40	November 5, 1949	Storrs, CT	Connecticut	23–0
41	November 18, 1950	Kingston, RI	Rhode Island	14–7
42	November 17, 1951	Storrs, CT	Connecticut	21–6
43	November 15, 1952	Kingston, RI	Rhode Island	28–25
44	November 14, 1953	Storrs, CT	Rhode Island	19–13
45	November 13, 1954	Kingston, RI	Rhode Island	20–0
46	November 12, 1955	Storrs, CT	Rhode Island	25–0
47	November 17, 1956	Kingston, RI	Connecticut	51–6
48	November 16, 1957	Storrs, CT	Tie	0–0

No.	Date	Location	Winner	Score
49	November 15, 1958	Kingston, RI	Connecticut	36–8
50	November 14, 1959	Storrs, CT	Connecticut	34–0
51	November 12, 1960	Storrs, CT	Connecticut	42–6
52	November 18, 1961	Kingston, RI	Connecticut	37–0
53	November 17, 1962	Storrs, CT	Connecticut	27–0
54	November 16, 1963	Kingston, RI	Rhode Island	13–12
55	November 14, 1964	Storrs, CT	Connecticut	28–7
56	November 13, 1965	Kingston, RI	Connecticut	14–0
57	November 12, 1966	Storrs, CT	Tie	0–0
58	November 18, 1967	Kingston, RI	Connecticut	26–18
59	November 16, 1968	Storrs, CT	Connecticut	35–6
60	November 15, 1969	Kingston, RI	Connecticut	25–15
61	November 14, 1970	Storrs, CT	Connecticut	33–12
62	November 13, 1971	Kingston, RI	Connecticut	10–6
63	November 18, 1972	Storrs, CT	Connecticut	42–21
64	November 17, 1973	Kingston, RI	Tie	7–7
65	November 16, 1974	Storrs, CT	Rhode Island	14–13
66	November 15, 1975	Kingston, RI	Connecticut	21–10
67	November 13, 1976	Storrs, CT	Rhode Island	17–14
68	November 12, 1977	Kingston, RI	Rhode Island	14–7
69	November 18, 1978	Storrs, CT	Connecticut	31–6
70	November 17, 1979	Kingston, RI	Connecticut	10–9
71	November 15, 1980	Storrs, CT	Connecticut	56–30
72	November 14, 1981	Kingston, RI	Rhode Island	34–29
73	November 13, 1982	Storrs, CT	Connecticut	26–21
74	November 12, 1983	Kingston, RI	Connecticut	18–17
75	November 17, 1984	Storrs, CT	Rhode Island	29–19
76	November 16, 1985	Kingston, RI	Rhode Island	56–42
77	November 15, 1986	Storrs, CT	Connecticut	21–14
78	November 14, 1987	Kingston, RI	Connecticut	52–7
79	November 19, 1988	Storrs, CT	Rhode Island	21–19
80	November 18, 1989	Kingston, RI	Connecticut	35–28
81	November 17, 1990	Storrs, CT	Connecticut	51–21
82	November 23, 1991	Kingston, RI	Rhode Island	20–10
83	November 21, 1992	Storrs, CT	Connecticut	38–0
84	November 6, 1993	Kingston, RI	Connecticut	41–9
85	October 22, 1994	Storrs, CT	Connecticut	33–16
86	October 21, 1995	Kingston, RI	Rhode Island	24–19
87	October 19, 1996	Storrs, CT	Connecticut	1–0^{†}
88	October 25, 1997	Storrs, CT	Connecticut	37–21
89	October 24, 1998	Storrs, CT	Connecticut	31–17
90	October 2, 1999	Storrs, CT	Connecticut	20–9
91	November 11, 2000	Storrs, CT	Rhode Island	26–21
92	August 31, 2006	East Hartford, CT	Connecticut	52–7
93	September 26, 2009	East Hartford, CT	Connecticut	52–10
94	September 15, 2018	East Hartford, CT	Connecticut	56–49
Series: Connecticut leads 52–34–8

† By forfeit

== See also ==
- List of NCAA college football rivalry games
