= Athletic League of New England State Colleges =

College sports conference, 1896–1922

- Founded: c. 1896
- Folded: 1922
- Sports fielded: College football, college basketball

The Athletic League of New England State Colleges (ALNESC) was one of the earliest college athletics conferences in the United States. It existed from 1896 to 1922, with its membership centered in the New England region.

== Membership ==
- Massachusetts Agricultural College (now University of Massachusetts Amherst)
- Storrs Agricultural College (now University of Connecticut)
- Rhode Island College of Agriculture and the Mechanic Arts (now University of Rhode Island)

== See also ==
- List of defunct college football conferences
