= List of New England Conference football standings =

This is a list of yearly New England Conference football standings.

== New England standings ==
1923 New England Conference football standings
	Conf.					Overall
Team	W		L		T	W		L		T
Maine $	3	–	0	–	0	5	–	3	–	0
New Hampshire	1	–	1	–	1	4	–	4	–	1
Connecticut	1	–	1	–	1	3	–	4	–	1
Rhode Island State	0	–	3	–	0	1	–	5	–	1
Massachusetts	0	–	0	–	0	2	–	5	–	0
$ – Conference champion

1924 New England Conference football standings
	Conf.					Overall
Team	W		L		T	W		L		T
Connecticut $	4	–	0	–	0	6	–	0	–	2
New Hampshire	2	–	1	–	0	7	–	2	–	0
Maine	1	–	2	–	0	4	–	3	–	1
Massachusetts	0	–	1	–	0	6	–	1	–	1
Rhode Island State	0	–	3	–	0	0	–	7	–	0
$ – Conference champion

1925 New England Conference football standings
	Conf.					Overall
Team	W		L		T	W		L		T
New Hampshire $	2	–	0	–	1	4	–	1	–	2
Maine	1	–	0	–	1	5	–	2	–	1
Massachusetts	1	–	0	–	0	6	–	2	–	0
Rhode Island State	0	–	1	–	1	2	–	5	–	1
Connecticut	0	–	3	–	1	3	–	5	–	1
$ – Conference champion

1926 New England Conference football standings
	Conf.					Overall
Team	W		L		T	W		L		T
Connecticut $	3	–	1	–	0	7	–	1	–	0
Maine	2	–	1	–	0	7	–	1	–	0
New Hampshire	2	–	1	–	0	4	–	4	–	0
Massachusetts	0	–	1	–	0	1	–	6	–	0
Rhode Island State	0	–	3	–	0	1	–	6	–	0
$ – Conference champion

1927 New England Conference football standings
	Conf.					Overall
Team	W		L		T	W		L		T
Maine $	3	–	0	–	0	6	–	1	–	0
Rhode Island State	2	–	1	–	0	5	–	3	–	0
Connecticut	1	–	2	–	0	5	–	4	–	0
New Hampshire	0	–	3	–	0	0	–	7	–	1
Massachusetts	0	–	0	–	0	0	–	7	–	1
$ – Conference champion

1928 New England Conference football standings
	Conf.					Overall
Team	W		L		T	W		L		T
Maine +	2	–	0	–	1	4	–	1	–	2
Connecticut +	1	–	0	–	2	4	–	1	–	3
New Hampshire	1	–	1	–	1	3	–	2	–	3
Rhode Island State	0	–	3	–	0	2	–	7	–	0
Massachusetts	0	–	0	–	0	2	–	5	–	1
+ – Conference co-champions

1929 New England Conference football standings
	Conf.					Overall
Team	W		L		T	W		L		T
New Hampshire $	2	–	0	–	0	7	–	2	–	0
Rhode Island State	1	–	1	–	0	5	–	2	–	1
Connecticut	1	–	2	–	0	4	–	4	–	0
Maine	1	–	2	–	0	2	–	5	–	0
Massachusetts	0	–	0	–	0	3	–	4	–	1
$ – Conference champion

1930 New England Conference football standings
	Conf.					Overall
Team	W		L		T	W		L		T
New Hampshire $	2	–	0	–	0	5	–	2	–	1
Maine	2	–	1	–	0	3	–	4	–	0
Rhode Island State	0	–	1	–	1	5	–	2	–	1
Connecticut	0	–	2	–	1	1	–	5	–	1
$ – Conference champion; Dubious – Discuss

1931 New England Conference football standings
	Conf.					Overall
Team	W		L		T	W		L		T
New Hampshire +	2	–	0	–	0	7	–	2	–	0
Rhode Island State +	2	–	0	–	0	4	–	4	–	0
Maine	1	–	2	–	0	4	–	3	–	0
Connecticut	0	–	3	–	0	2	–	3	–	3
+ – Conference co-champions

1932 New England Conference football standings
	Conf.					Overall
Team	W		L		T	W		L		T
Maine $	2	–	0	–	1	5	–	1	–	1
New Hampshire	1	–	0	–	1	3	–	4	–	1
Rhode Island State	0	–	1	–	1	2	–	5	–	1
Connecticut	0	–	2	–	1	0	–	6	–	2
$ – Conference champion

1933 New England Conference football standings
	Conf.					Overall
Team	W		L		T	W		L		T
Rhode Island State $	2	–	0	–	0	6	–	2	–	0
New Hampshire	1	–	0	–	0	3	–	3	–	1
Connecticut State	0	–	1	–	0	1	–	6	–	1
Maine	0	–	2	–	0	4	–	3	–	0
$ – Conference champion

1934 New England Conference football standings
	Conf.					Overall
Team	W		L		T	W		L		T
New Hampshire $	1	–	0	–	0	3	–	4	–	2
Rhode Island State	2	–	1	–	0	6	–	3	–	0
Connecticut State	0	–	1	–	0	1	–	7	–	0
Maine	0	–	2	–	0	4	–	3	–	0
$ – Conference champion

1935 New England Conference football standings
	Conf.					Overall
Team	W		L		T	W		L		T
Maine $	2	–	0	–	0	3	–	3	–	1
Rhode Island State	1	–	1	–	0	4	–	4	–	1
Connecticut State	0	–	1	–	0	2	–	4	–	1
New Hampshire	0	–	1	–	0	2	–	5	–	1
$ – Conference champion

1936 New England Conference football standings
	Conf.					Overall
Team	W		L		T	W		L		T
Connecticut State $	2	–	0	–	0	7	–	2	–	0
Maine	1	–	1	–	0	4	–	3	–	0
Rhode Island State	1	–	2	–	0	5	–	4	–	0
New Hampshire	0	–	1	–	0	3	–	3	–	2
$ – Conference champion

1937 New England Conference football standings
	Conf.					Overall
Team	W		L		T	W		L		T
New Hampshire +	1	–	0	–	0	7	–	1	–	0
Connecticut State +	1	–	0	–	0	6	–	2	–	1
Maine	0	–	1	–	1	2	–	3	–	2
Rhode Island State	0	–	2	–	1	3	–	4	–	1
+ – Conference co-champions

1938 New England Conference football standings
	Conf.					Overall
Team	W		L		T	W		L		T
Rhode Island State $	2	–	0	–	0	4	–	4	–	0
Maine	2	–	1	–	0	3	–	4	–	0
New Hampshire	1	–	1	–	0	3	–	6	–	0
Northeastern	0	–	0	–	0	3	–	3	–	1
Connecticut State	0	–	3	–	0	4	–	3	–	0
$ – Conference champion

1939 New England Conference football standings
	Conf.					Overall
Team	W		L		T	W		L		T
Maine $	3	–	0	–	0	5	–	2	–	0
Connecticut	1	–	1	–	0	5	–	3	–	0
New Hampshire	1	–	1	–	0	3	–	5	–	0
Rhode Island State	1	–	2	–	0	3	–	4	–	1
Northeastern	0	–	2	–	0	0	–	6	–	1
$ – Conference champion

1940 New England Conference football standings
	Conf.					Overall
Team	W		L		T	W		L		T
New Hampshire $	2	–	0	–	0	5	–	3	–	0
Rhode Island State	2	–	1	–	0	5	–	3	–	0
Connecticut	1	–	2	–	0	4	–	4	–	0
Maine	1	–	2	–	0	1	–	6	–	0
Northeastern	0	–	1	–	0	2	–	6	–	0
$ – Conference champion

1941 New England Conference football standings
	Conf.					Overall
Team	W		L		T	W		L		T
Rhode Island State $	2	–	0	–	0	5	–	2	–	1
Maine	2	–	1	–	1	3	–	2	–	2
New Hampshire	0	–	0	–	1	4	–	3	–	1
Northeastern	0	–	1	–	0	4	–	3	–	0
Connecticut	0	–	2	–	0	2	–	6	–	0
$ – Conference champion

1942 New England Conference football standings
	Conf.					Overall
Team	W		L		T	W		L		T
New Hampshire +	3	–	0	–	0	6	–	0	–	0
Connecticut +	2	–	0	–	0	6	–	2	–	0
Northeastern	0	–	1	–	0	0	–	5	–	1
Rhode Island State	0	–	2	–	0	3	–	3	–	0
Maine	0	–	2	–	0	2	–	4	–	0
+ – Conference co-champions

1944 New England Conference football standings
	Conf.					Overall
Team	W		L		T	W		L		T
New Hampshire +	1	–	1	–	0	1	–	3	–	0
Maine +	1	–	1	–	0	2	–	2	–	0
Connecticut	0	–	0	–	0	7	–	1	–	0
+ – Conference co-champions

1945 New England Conference football standings
	Conf.					Overall
Team	W		L		T	W		L		T
Connecticut +	2	–	0	–	0	7	–	1	–	0
Rhode Island State +	1	–	0	–	0	2	–	1	–	0
Maine	0	–	3	–	0	0	–	5	–	0
+ – Conference co-champions

1946 New England Conference football standings
	Conf.					Overall
Team	W		L		T	W		L		T
New Hampshire +	2	–	0	–	1	6	–	1	–	1
Connecticut +	2	–	0	–	1	4	–	3	–	1
Rhode Island State	1	–	2	–	0	2	–	4	–	0
Maine	0	–	3	–	0	2	–	5	–	0
+ – Conference co-champions
