= 1930 New Hampshire Wildcats football team =

American college football season

1930 New Hampshire Wildcats football
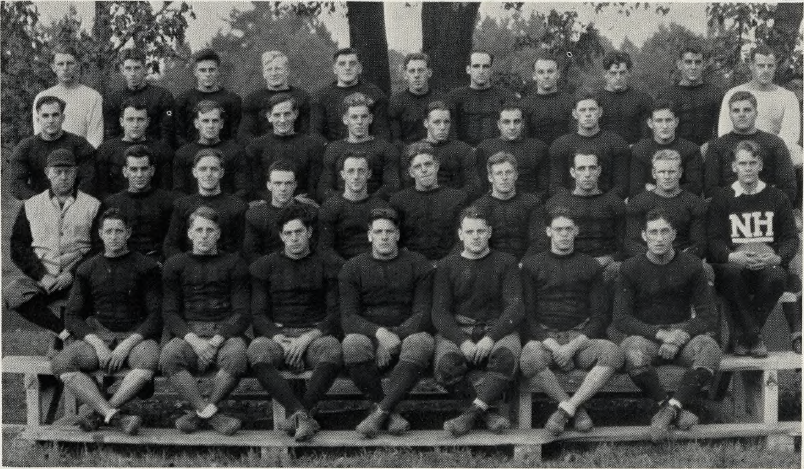
- Conference: New England Conference
- Record: 5–2–1 (2–0 New England)
- Head coach: Butch Cowell (15th season)
- Captain: Kenneth Clapp & Herbert Hagstrom
- Home stadium: Memorial Field

1930 New England Conference football standings
	Conf.					Overall
Team	W		L		T	W		L		T
New Hampshire $	2	–	0	–	0	5	–	2	–	1
Maine	2	–	1	–	0	3	–	4	–	0
Rhode Island State	0	–	1	–	1	5	–	2	–	1
Connecticut	0	–	2	–	1	1	–	5	–	1
$ – Conference champion; Dubious – Discuss

The 1930 New Hampshire Wildcats football team was an American football team that represented the University of New Hampshire as a member of the New England Conference during the 1930 college football season. In its 15th season under head coach William "Butch" Cowell, (Note: This was Cowell's 16th year and 15th season as head coach, as the school did not field a team in 1918 due to World War I.) the team compiled a 5–2–1 record, and outscored their opponents, 160–54. The team played its home games in Durham, New Hampshire, at Memorial Field. (Note: Memorial Field remains in use by the New Hampshire women's field hockey team.)

== Schedule ==
Date	Opponent	Site	Result	Attendance	Source
October 4	at Boston University*	Nickerson Field (Note: This was a different venue than the like-named Nickerson Field in Boston, used by BU in later years.); Weston, MA	T 12–12		
October 11	at Lowell Textile* (Note: Lowell Textile is now University of Massachusetts Lowell.)	Lowell, MA	W 20–0		
October 18	Maine	Memorial Field; Durham, NH (rivalry)	W 14–6		
October 25	Vermont*^{†}	Memorial Field; Durham, NH	W 59–0		
November 1	at Tufts*	Tufts Oval; Medford, MA	L 8–10		
November 8	Connecticut	Memorial Field; Durham, NH	W 33–0		
November 15	at Springfield*	Pratt Field; Springfield, MA	L 7–26		
November 22	at Brown*	Brown Stadium; Providence, RI	W 7–0		
*Non-conference game; ^{†}Homecoming; Source:

In 15 contests between New Hampshire and Brown, played during 1905–1931, the 1930 game was the only Wildcat victory.

Wildcat co-captain Herbert Hagstrom would go on to serve as principal and later superintendent of nearby Portsmouth High School; he died in March 1971 at age 62. Co-captain Kenneth Clapp died in September 1959 at age 51; he had served in World War II and worked for Kraft Foods in the Chicago area.
