= 1924 New Hampshire football team =

American college football season

1924 New Hampshire football
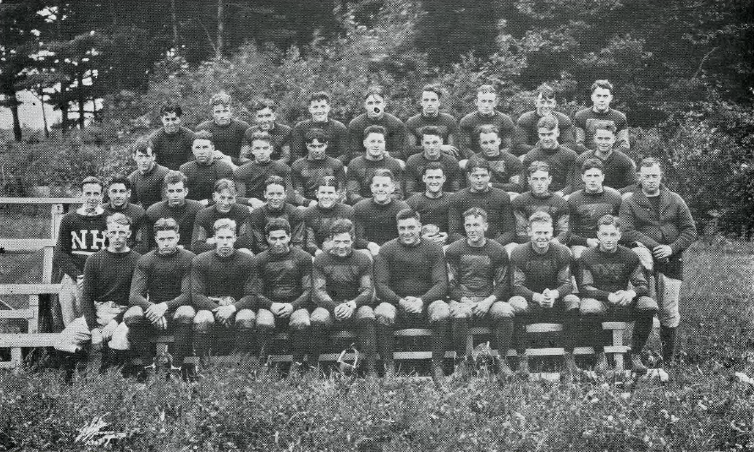
- Conference: New England Conference
- Record: 7–2 (2–1 New England)
- Head coach: Butch Cowell (9th season)
- Captain: Cy Wentworth
- Home stadium: Memorial Field

1924 New England Conference football standings
	Conf.					Overall
Team	W		L		T	W		L		T
Connecticut $	4	–	0	–	0	6	–	0	–	2
New Hampshire	2	–	1	–	0	7	–	2	–	0
Maine	1	–	2	–	0	4	–	3	–	1
Massachusetts	0	–	1	–	0	6	–	1	–	1
Rhode Island State	0	–	3	–	0	0	–	7	–	0
$ – Conference champion

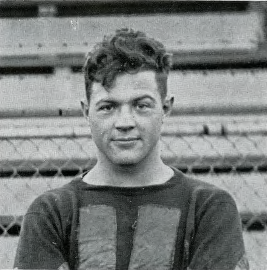
Team captain Cy Wentworth c. 1923, in the annual college yearbook

The 1924 New Hampshire football team (Note: The school did not adopt the Wildcats nickname until February 1926; before then, they were generally referred to as "the blue and white".) was an American football team that represented the University of New Hampshire as a member of the New England Conference during the 1924 college football season. In its ninth season under head coach William "Butch" Cowell, (Note: This was Cowell's 10th year and 9th season as head coach, as the school did not field a varsity team in 1918 due to World War I.) the team compiled a 7–2 record, and outscored opponents by a total of 213 to 49. The team played its home games in Durham, New Hampshire, at Memorial Field. (Note: Memorial Field remains in use by the New Hampshire women's field hockey team.)

== Schedule ==
Date	Opponent	Site	Result	Attendance	Source
September 27	Colby*	Memorial Field; Durham, NH	W 27–0		
October 4	Norwich*	Memorial Field; Durham, NH	W 46–10		
October 11	at Rhode Island State	Kingston, RI	W 17–6		
October 18	at Connecticut	Gardner Dow Field; Storrs, CT	L 3–6		
October 25	vs. Tufts*	Textile Field; Manchester, NH	W 20–0	10,000	
November 1	at Lowell Textile* (Note: Lowell Textile is now University of Massachusetts Lowell.)	Lowell, MA	W 37–6		
November 8	Maine^{†}	Memorial Field; Durham, NH (rivalry)	W 33–0	4,000+	
November 15	Bates*	Memorial Field; Durham, NH	W 30–0		
November 22	at Brown*	Andrews Field; Providence, RI	L 0–21		
*Non-conference game; ^{†}Homecoming; Source:

Cy Wentworth, team captain for a second consecutive season, was an inaugural member of the UNH Wildcats Hall of Fame in 1982.
