= James W. Dunn =

American football and basketball coach (1911–1983)

- Dunn pictured in The Cauldron 1938, Northeastern yearbook

Biographical details
- Born: October 16, 1911; Grove City, Pennsylvania, U.S.
- Died: April 9, 1983 (aged 71); Kennebunk, Maine, U.S.

Playing career

Football
- 1931–1933: Western Maryland
- Position: Halfback

Coaching career (HC unless noted)

Football
- 1934: Western Maryland (assistant)
- 1935–1936: Harvard (JV)
- 1937–1941: Northeastern
- 1946: Lafayette (backfield)
- 1947–1948: Brown (backfield)
- 1949–1951: Yale (defensive backfield)
- 1952–1960: Montreal Alouettes (backfield)
- 1961–1962: Saskatchewan Roughriders (backfield)
- 1963: Syracuse Stormers (assistant)
- 1964: Toronto Argonauts (backfield)
- 1965: Montreal Alouettes (backfield)
- 1966–1969: Sanford HS (ME) (assistant)

Basketball
- 1934–1935: Western Maryland (freshmen)
- 1937–1942: Northeastern

Head coaching record
- Overall: 13–21–2 (football); 26–58 (basketball)

James William Dunn (October 16, 1911 – April 9, 1983) was an American football and basketball coach. He served as the head football coach at Northeastern University from 1937 to 1941, compiling a record of 13–21–2 record. Dunn was also head basketball coach at Northeastern from 1937 to 1942, tallying a mark of 26–58.

== Career ==
Dunn was born in Grove City, Pennsylvania. He graduated from Grove City High School and enrolled at Western Maryland College in 1930. He played halfback for the school's football team and served as an assistant under Dick Harlow in 1934. Dunn also played basketball at Western Maryland and was the freshman basketball coach during the 1934–35 season. In 1935, Harlow became the head coach at Harvard and Dunn joined him as junior varsity football coach.

In February 1937, Dunn was named head football and basketball coach at Northeastern. He remained with the school until March 1942, when he entered the United States Army. In February 1946, he elected to remain in the Army and resigned his position at Northeastern. However, five months later, he returned to coaching as an assistant at Lafayette.

In 1947, Dunn became the varsity backfield coach at Brown. From 1949 to 1951, he was the defensive backfield coach at Yale.

In 1952, Dunn moved to the Interprovincial Rugby Football Union as an assistant to Peahead Walker with the Montreal Alouettes. Walker and Dunn had previously coached together at Yale. In 1961, he became an assistant under Steve Owen with the Saskatchewan Roughriders. In 1963, he and Owen joined the Syracuse Stormers of the United Football League. In 1964, he returned to Canada as the backfield coach of the Toronto Argonauts. He returned to Montreal the following year as an assistant under Jim Trimble. Dunn then served as a football coach and teacher at Sanford High School in Sanford, Maine. He was relieved of his coaching duties prior to the 1970–71 school year.

== Personal life ==
In 1937, Dunn married Hilda Foley, a Somerville, Massachusetts schoolteacher and the daughter of state senator Louis Foley. They had two daughters.

Dunn retired from teaching in 1978 and resided in Kennebunk, Maine until his death on April 9, 1983.

== Head coaching record ==
=== Football ===
Year	Team	Overall	Conference	Standing	Bowl/playoffs
Northeastern Huskies (Independent) (1937)
1937	Northeastern	4–3			
Northeastern Huskies (New England Conference) (1938–1941)
1938	Northeastern	3–3–1	0–0	4th	
1939	Northeastern	0–6–1	0–2	5th	
1940	Northeastern	2–6	0–1	5th	
1941	Northeastern	4–3	0–1	4th	
Northeastern:		13–21–2	0–4		
Total:		13–21–2			
