= Cy Wentworth (American football) =

American football player (1904–1986)

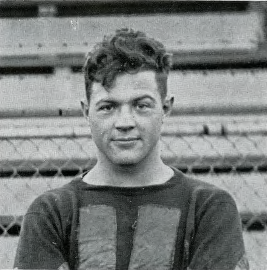
- Wentworth c. 1923, from the annual college yearbook of the University of New Hampshire

Profile
- Positions: Halfback, end, fullback

Personal information
- Born: January 2, 1904; Salem, Massachusetts, U.S.
- Died: January 19, 1986 (aged 82); Beverly, Massachusetts, U.S.
- Listed height: 5 ft 8 in (1.73 m)
- Listed weight: 160 lb (73 kg)

Career information
- High school: Salem (MA)
- College: New Hampshire (1921–1924)

Career history
- Providence Steam Roller (1925–1926); Boston Bulldogs (1929)

Awards and highlights
- 1x GB Press-Gazette 2nd team all-NFL (1925)
- Stats at Pro Football Reference

Shirley P. "Cy" Wentworth (January 2, 1904 – January 19, 1986) was an American professional football player who spent three seasons in the National Football League (NFL), having played for the Providence Steam Roller in 1925 and 1926, and with the Boston Bulldogs in 1929.

Prior to joining the NFL, Wentworth played college football at the University of New Hampshire. With the New Hampshire Wildcats, Wentworth scored 166 career points via field goals, extra points and touchdowns. He had a career-high 11 touchdowns and 85 points in 1924, and led the team in scoring from 1922 to 1924. He was New Hampshire's team captain for the 1923 and 1924 seasons. Wentworth holds the New Hampshire record for the most points scored in a single game, 37, achieved on November 3, 1923, against Lowell Tech (now University of Massachusetts Lowell), made via six touchdowns and one extra point kick.

Wentworth was an inaugural member of the UNH Wildcats Hall of Fame in 1982. He died in January 1986 at age 82 in Beverly, Massachusetts, and was interred at Greenlawn Cemetery in Salem, Massachusetts.
