= 1936 New Hampshire Wildcats football team =

American college football season

1936 New Hampshire Wildcats football
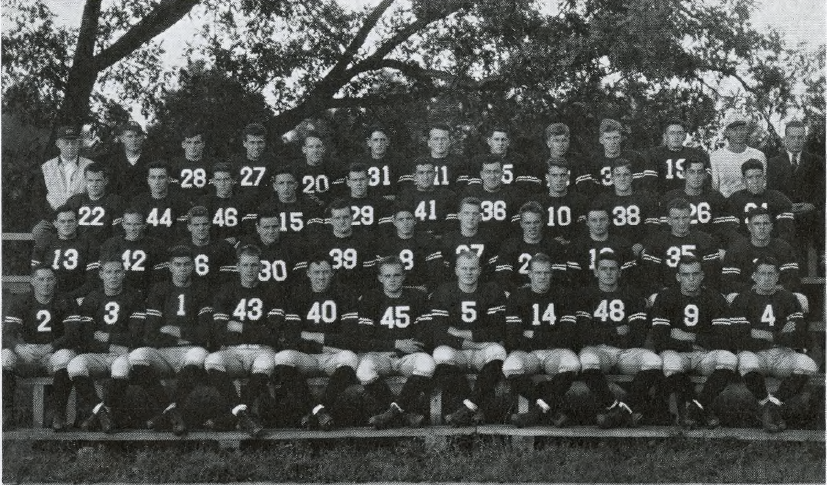
- Conference: New England Conference
- Record: 3–3–2 (0–1 New England)
- Head coach: Butch Cowell (21st season)
- Captain: Benjamin Lang
- Home stadium: Lewis Field

1936 New England Conference football standings
	Conf.					Overall
Team	W		L		T	W		L		T
Connecticut State $	2	–	0	–	0	7	–	2	–	0
Maine	1	–	1	–	0	4	–	3	–	0
Rhode Island State	1	–	2	–	0	5	–	4	–	0
New Hampshire	0	–	1	–	0	3	–	3	–	2
$ – Conference champion

The 1936 New Hampshire Wildcats football team was an American football team that represented the University of New Hampshire as a member of the New England Conference during the 1936 college football season. In its 21st season under head coach William "Butch" Cowell, (Note: This was Cowell's 22nd year and 21st season as head coach, as the school did not field a team in 1918 due to World War I.) the team compiled a 3–3–2 record, outscoring their opponents 137–76. The team scored 120 of their points in two shutout wins, and only 17 total points in their other six games. The team played its home games at Lewis Field (also known as Lewis Stadium) in Durham, New Hampshire.

The September 26 game against Lowell Textile Institute (now University of Massachusetts Lowell) was the first football game played at New Hampshire's new athletic facilities, originally named Lewis Fields after former university president Edward M. Lewis, with the football stadium referred to as Lewis Stadium or simply Lewis Field. The stadium was dedicated on October 10 with the rivalry game against the Maine. In 1952, it was named Cowell Stadium in honor of coach Cowell. It retained that name until renovations following the 2015 season, when it was renamed Wildcat Stadium.

A contemporary news report noted that Cowell had been "handicapped by illness during the past couple of years", with active coaching duties handled by his assistants. This was Cowell's final season as head coach; he died in August 1940 at the age of 53.

== Schedule ==
Date	Opponent	Site	Result	Attendance	Source
September 26	Lowell Textile* (Note: Lowell Textile is now University of Massachusetts Lowell.)	Lewis Field; Durham, NH	W 66–0		
October 3	at Bates*	Garcelon Field; Lewiston, ME	W 9–6		
October 10	Maine^{†}	Lewis Field; Durham, NH (rivalry)	L 6–27		
October 17	Boston College*	Lewis Field; Durham, NH	L 0–12	1,200	
October 24	at Vermont*	Centennial Field; Burlington, VT	W 54–0	2,000	
October 31	Saint Anselm*	Lewis Field; Durham, NH	L 2–31		
November 7	at Tufts*	Tufts Oval; Medford, MA	T 0–0		
November 14	Springfiel*	Lewis Field; Durham, NH	T 0–0		
*Non-conference game; ^{†}Homecoming; Source:

The 1936 game remains the last time that the Boston College and New Hampshire football programs have met. The 66–0 win over Lowell Textile still stands as the Wildcats' largest margin of victory.

Wildcat captain Benjamin Lang, who also played lacrosse, served in the United States Navy in World War II and later became a Certified Public Accountant; he died in September 1951 at age 35.
