= 1928 New Hampshire Wildcats football team =

American college football season

1928 New Hampshire Wildcats football
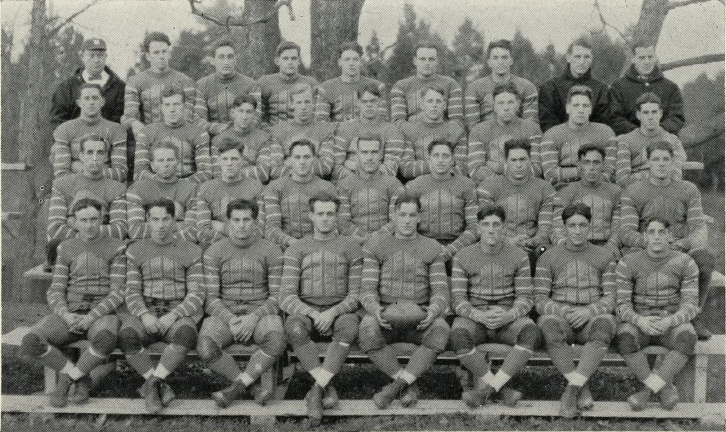
- Conference: New England Conference
- Record: 3–2–3 (1–1–1 New England)
- Head coach: Butch Cowell (13th season)
- Captain: Lyle Farrell
- Home stadium: Memorial Field

1928 New England Conference football standings
	Conf.					Overall
Team	W		L		T	W		L		T
Maine +	2	–	0	–	1	4	–	1	–	2
Connecticut +	1	–	0	–	2	4	–	1	–	3
New Hampshire	1	–	1	–	1	3	–	2	–	3
Rhode Island State	0	–	3	–	0	2	–	7	–	0
Massachusetts	0	–	0	–	0	2	–	5	–	1
+ – Conference co-champions

The 1928 New Hampshire Wildcats football team was an American football team that represented the University of New Hampshire as a member of the New England Conference during the 1928 college football season. In its 13th season under head coach William "Butch" Cowell, (Note: This was Cowell's 14th year and 13th season as head coach, as the school did not field a team in 1918 due to World War I.) the team compiled a 3–2–3 record, and were outscored by their opponents, 34–30. The team was shut out five times, although three of those games ended as scoreless ties. The team played its home games in Durham, New Hampshire, at Memorial Field. (Note: Memorial Field remains in use by the New Hampshire women's field hockey team.)

== Schedule ==
Date	Time	Opponent	Site	Result	Attendance	Source
September 29		Colby*	Memorial Field; Durham, NH	W 12–7		
October 6	3:00 p.m.	at Boston University*	Nickerson Field (Note: This was BU's inaugural game at their first Nickerson Field, a different venue than the like-named Nickerson Field in Boston, used by BU in later years.); Weston, MA	T 0–0		
October 13		at Rhode Island State	Meade Field; Kingston, RI	W 12–0	5,000	
October 20		Maine	Memorial Field; Durham, NH (rivalry)	L 0–7	7,000	
October 27		at Springfield*	Pratt Field; Springfield, MA	W 6–0		
November 3		at Tufts*	Tufts Oval; Medford, MA	T 0–0		
November 10		Connecticut^{†}	Memorial Field; Durham, NH	T 0–0		
November 17		at Brown*	Brown Stadium; Providence, RI	L 0–20		
*Non-conference game; ^{†}Homecoming; All times are in Eastern time; Source:

The 1928 game was the last meeting between New Hampshire and Rhode Island until 1942.

The Maine game was attended by Governor of New Hampshire Huntley N. Spaulding.

Wildcat captain Lyle Harlan Farrell later served as headmaster at Proctor Academy in Andover, New Hampshire, where the fieldhouse carries his name.
