= 1923 New Hampshire football team =

American college football season

1923 New Hampshire football
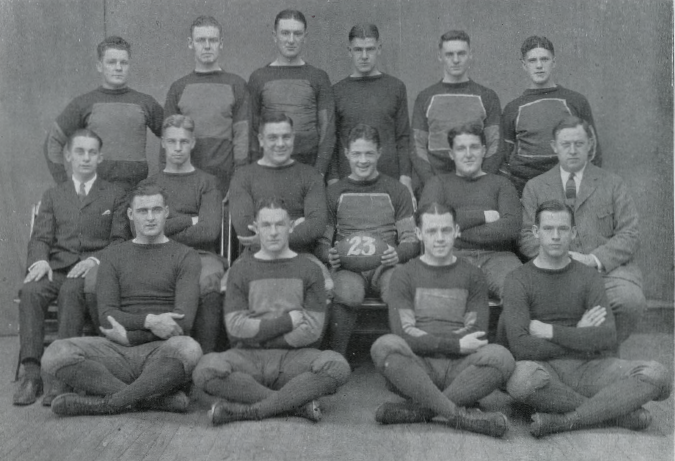
- Conference: New England Conference
- Record: 4–4–1 (1–1–1 New England)
- Head coach: Butch Cowell (8th season)
- Captain: Cy Wentworth
- Home stadium: Memorial Field

1923 New England Conference football standings
	Conf.					Overall
Team	W		L		T	W		L		T
Maine $	3	–	0	–	0	5	–	3	–	0
New Hampshire	1	–	1	–	1	4	–	4	–	1
Connecticut	1	–	1	–	1	3	–	4	–	1
Rhode Island State	0	–	3	–	0	1	–	5	–	1
Massachusetts	0	–	0	–	0	2	–	5	–	0
$ – Conference champion

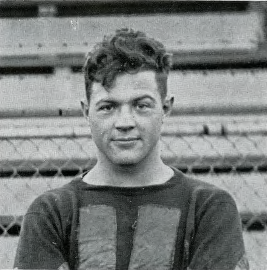
Team captain Cy Wentworth c. 1923, in the annual college yearbook

The 1923 New Hampshire football team (Note: The school did not adopt the Wildcats nickname until February 1926; before then, they were generally referred to as "the blue and white".) was an American football team that represented the University of New Hampshire as a member of the New England Conference during the 1923 college football season. In its eighth season under head coach William "Butch" Cowell, (Note: This was Cowell's 9th year and 8th season as head coach, as the school did not field a varsity team in 1918 due to World War I.) the team compiled a 4–4–1 record, and outscored opponents by a total of 106 to 75. The team played its home games in Durham, New Hampshire, at Memorial Field. (Note: Memorial Field remains in use by the New Hampshire women's field hockey team.)

This was the first season that the team represented the University of New Hampshire, which had been incorporated on July 1, 1923. In prior seasons, the school had operated as New Hampshire College of Agriculture and the Mechanic Arts. (Note: The school was often referred to as New Hampshire College or New Hampshire State College in newspapers of the era.) This was also the first season of play for the New England Conference.

== Schedule ==
Date	Time	Opponent	Site	Result	Attendance	Source
September 29		Middlebury*	Memorial Field; Durham, NH	L 0–21		
October 6		at Norwich*	Sabine Field; Northfield, VT	W 19–7		
October 13		Rhode Island State	Memorial Field; Durham, NH	W 12–0		
October 20		Connecticut^{†}	Memorial Field; Durham, NH	T 0–0		
October 27		vs. Vermont*	Textile Field; Manchester, NH	L 7–28	6,000	
November 3		Lowell Textile* (Note: Lowell Textile is now University of Massachusetts Lowell.)	Memorial Field; Durham, NH	W 47–0		
November 10	2:00 p.m.	vs. Maine	Bayside Park; Portland, ME (rivalry)	L 0–13		
November 17		at Bates*	Lewiston, ME	W 21–0		
November 24		at Brown*	Andrews Field; Providence, RI	L 0–6		
*Non-conference game; ^{†}Homecoming; All times are in Eastern time; Source:

The Vermont game was attended by Governor of New Hampshire Fred H. Brown.

During the November 3 game against Lowell Textile, New Hampshire tackle Leonard P. Stearnes experienced abdominal pain. Later admitted to a hospital in his hometown of Belmont, Massachusetts, he died on November 8. The 1925 edition of The Granite, New Hampshire's annual college yearbook, was dedicated to Stearnes.

Team captain Cy Wentworth set, and still holds, the New Hampshire record for most points scored in a single game, with 37 points against Lowell Textile, made via six touchdowns and one extra point kick.
