= Butch Cowell =

American football player and sports coach (1887–1940)

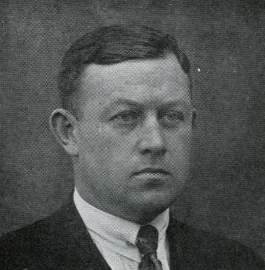
- Cowell in The Granite yearbook, 1925 edition

Biographical details
- Born: July 21, 1887; Lynn, Massachusetts, U.S.
- Died: August 28, 1940 (aged 53); Dover, New Hampshire, U.S.

Playing career
- 1909–1910: Kansas
- 1911: Illinois
- 1913: Pittsburgh
- Positions: Tackle, end

Coaching career (HC unless noted)

Football
- 1914: Haskell (assistant)
- 1915–1936 (Note: Cowell was New Hampshire's football head coach for 21 seasons in 22 years, as the school did not field a varsity team in 1918 due to World War I.): New Hampshire

Basketball
- 1916–1928: New Hampshire

Baseball
- 1916: New Hampshire
- 1919–1921: New Hampshire

Head coaching record
- Overall: 87–68–23 (football); 119–54 (basketball); 17–25–2 (baseball)

Accomplishments and honors

Awards
- Amos Alonzo Stagg Award (1941)

William Harold "Butch" Cowell (July 21, 1887 – August 28, 1940) was an American football player and coach of football, basketball, and baseball. He is best known for his tenure as head coach of the New Hampshire Wildcats football team from 1915 to 1936.

== Biography ==
Cowell was born on July 21, 1887, in Lynn, Massachusetts. His family moved to Clyde, Kansas, where he played high school football. He later played college football at Kansas, Illinois, and Pittsburgh.

Cowell served as the head coach of the University of New Hampshire's football team from 1915 to 1936, (Note: Before 1923, the school was named New Hampshire College of Agriculture and the Mechanic Arts.) except in 1918 when no varsity team was fielded. As a football coach, Cowell led his varsity teams to an overall record of 87 wins, 68 losses, and 23 ties, for a .553 winning percentage. In addition to coaching football, Cowell was also the head basketball coach, head baseball coach, and athletic director at New Hampshire. He was a founder of the American Football Coaches Association and served a term as the organization's president.

New Hampshire's Wildcat Stadium was named Cowell Stadium in his honor from 1952 until 2016. He was a member of the inaugural class of the Wildcat athletic Hall of Fame in 1982. He is also the "Cowell" in the name of the rivalry game with the Maine Black Bears, the Battle for the Brice-Cowell Musket.

During World War I, he served as a second lieutenant in the Yankee Division (26th Infantry Division). Cowell, who never married, died on August 28, 1940, in Dover, New Hampshire, at the age of 53 after a two-year illness. He was interred at Maple Grove Cemetery in Randolph, Maine. His brother, Roland Cowell, was also a coach and administrator in college athletics.

== Head coaching record ==
Note that New Hampshire did not adopt the Wildcats nickname until February 1926; before then, they were generally referred to as "the blue and white".

=== Football ===
Year	Team	Overall	Conference	Standing	Bowl/playoffs
New Hampshire (Independent) (1915–1922)
1915	New Hampshire	3–6–1			
1916	New Hampshire	3–5–2			
1917	New Hampshire	3–2–2			
1918	No varsity team†	—			
1919	New Hampshire	7–2			
1920	New Hampshire	5–2–1			
1921	New Hampshire	8–1–1			
1922	New Hampshire	3–5–1			
New Hampshire Wildcats (New England Conference) (1923–1936)
1923	New Hampshire	4–4–1	1–1–1	T–2nd	
1924	New Hampshire	7–2	2–1	2nd	
1925	New Hampshire	4–1–2	2–0–1	1st	
1926	New Hampshire	4–4	2–1	T–2nd	
1927	New Hampshire	0–7–1	0–3	4th	
1928	New Hampshire	3–2–3	1–1–1	3rd	
1929	New Hampshire	7–2	2–0	1st	
1930	New Hampshire	5–2–1	2–0	1st	
1931	New Hampshire	7–2 (Note: New Hampshire's varsity record in 1931 was 7–2. College Football Data Warehouse also lists a tied game, against Saint Anselm; however, contemporary news reports are clear that it was New Hampshire's freshman team that played Saint Anselm.)	2–0	1st	
1932	New Hampshire	3–4–1 (Note: New Hampshire's varsity record in 1932 was 3–4–1. College Football Data Warehouse lists an additional loss, to Saint Anselm; however, contemporary news reports are clear that it was New Hampshire's freshman team that played Saint Anselm.)	1–0–1	2nd	
1933	New Hampshire	3–3–1	1–0	2nd	
1934	New Hampshire	3–4–2	1–0	1st	
1935	New Hampshire	2–5–1	0–1	4th	
1936	New Hampshire	3–3–2	0–1	4th	
New Hampshire:		87–68–23	17–9–4		
Total:		87–68–23			
National championship Conference title Conference division title or championship game berth

† New Hampshire had an eight-game schedule planned for the 1918 season, which was abandoned due to World War I.
