= 1933 New Hampshire Wildcats football team =

American college football season

1933 New Hampshire Wildcats football
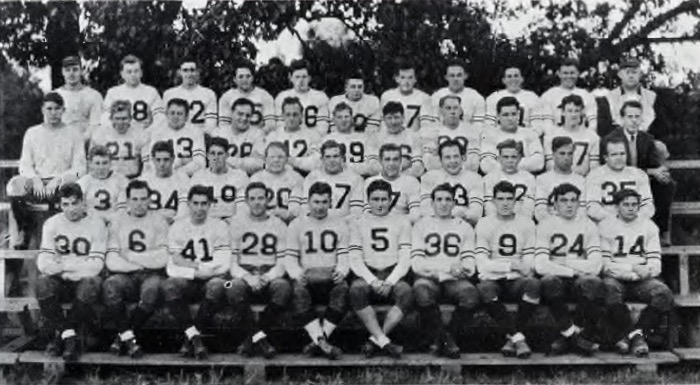
- Conference: New England Conference
- Record: 3–3–1 (1–0 New England)
- Head coach: Butch Cowell (18th season)
- Captain: Robert D. Haphey
- Home stadium: Memorial Field

1933 New England Conference football standings
	Conf.					Overall
Team	W		L		T	W		L		T
Rhode Island State $	2	–	0	–	0	6	–	2	–	0
New Hampshire	1	–	0	–	0	3	–	3	–	1
Connecticut State	0	–	1	–	0	1	–	6	–	1
Maine	0	–	2	–	0	4	–	3	–	0
$ – Conference champion

The 1933 New Hampshire Wildcats football team was an American football team that represented the University of New Hampshire as a member of the New England Conference during the 1933 college football season. In its 18th season under head coach William "Butch" Cowell, (Note: This was Cowell's 19th year and 18th season as head coach, as the school did not field a team in 1918 due to World War I.) the team played its home games in Durham, New Hampshire, at Memorial Field. (Note: Memorial Field remains in use by the New Hampshire women's field hockey team.) The team compiled a 3–3–1 record, and were outscored by their opponents, 65–51.

== Schedule ==
Date	Opponent	Site	Result	Attendance	Source
September 30	Lowell Textile* (Note: Lowell Textile is now University of Massachusetts Lowell.)	Memorial Field; Durham, NH	W 7–6		
October 7	Boston University*	Memorial Field; Durham, NH	W 35–6		
October 14	at Harvard*	Harvard Stadium; Boston, MA	L 0–34		
October 21	at Maine	Alumni Field; Orono, ME (rivalry)	W 6–0		
October 28	at Vermont*	Centennial Field; Burlington, VT	L 0–13	3,000	
November 4	Tufts*^{†}	Memorial Field; Durham, NH	L 3–6	7,000	
November 11	Springfield*	Memorial Field; Durham, NH	T 0–0		
*Non-conference game; ^{†}Homecoming; Source:

The university's website notes that 1933 team captain Robert Haphey had the team's mascot named in his honor during the prior season. The team had procured an actual wildcat, and decided to name it after "the first player to score for NH." Haphey earned that honor, and the wildcat was given his nickname, Skippy. Haphey served in the United States Army from 1934 to 1960, retiring as a lieutenant colonel with service in World War II and the Korean War—he died in November 1989 at age 81.
