= Sean Goldrich =

American football coach (born 1993)

Current position
- Title: Head coach
- Team: New Hampshire
- Conference: CAA
- Record: 2–7

Biographical details
- Born: July 6, 1993 (age 33); New York, New York, U.S.
- Education: University of New Hampshire (2015)

Playing career
- 2011–2015: New Hampshire
- 2017: Colorado Crush
- 2018: Arizona Rattlers
- Position: Quarterback

Coaching career (HC unless noted)
- 2016–2017: Notre Dame HS (CT) (co-OC/QB)
- 2018: New England (ME) (WR)
- 2019: Yale (OQC)
- 2020–2021: Yale (WR)
- 2022–2023: Delaware (QB)
- 2024: Delaware (QB/PGC)
- 2025: Delaware (QB/PGC/RC)
- 2026–present: New Hampshire

Head coaching record
- Overall: 2–7

Sean Goldrich (born July 6, 1993) is an American college football coach. He is the head football coach for the University of New Hampshire, a position he has held since 2026.

== Playing career ==
Goldrich was a five-year member of the New Hampshire football team as a quarterback, where he helped lead the team to two conference championships and four NCAA Division I playoff appearances. During his tenure, he amassed over 7,500 passing yards, 1,100 rushing yards, and a total of 67 touchdowns.

After graduating in 2015, Goldrich spent training camps with the Atlanta Falcons and Chicago Bears of the National Football League (NFL). He eventually signed with the Colorado Crush of the Indoor Football League (IFL) in 2017. He threw for 25 touchdowns and ran for four more.

In 2018, Goldrich served as a backup to Jeff Ziemba for the Arizona Rattlers of the IFL.

== Coaching career ==
In 2016, Goldrich began his coaching career at his alma mater, Notre Dame High School in West Haven, Connecticut, where he served as the team's co-offensive coordinator and quarterbacks coach. In 2018, he was hired as the wide receivers coach for the University of New England (Maine), a first-year NCAA Division III football program led by Mike Lichten.

After one season, Goldrich was hired as an offensive quality control coach for Yale. Following the season, he was promoted to wide receivers coach.

In 2022, Goldrich was hired as the quarterbacks coach for Delaware. He added the roles of passing game coordinator and recruiting coordinator in 2024 and 2025, respectively.

On December 29, 2025, Goldrich was announced as the 21st head football coach for his alma mater, New Hampshire.

== Head coaching record ==
Year	Team	Overall	Conference	Standing	Bowl/playoffs
New Hampshire Wildcats (Coastal Athletic Association Football Conference) (2026–present)
2026	New Hampshire	2–7	1–4		
New Hampshire:		2–7	1–4		
Total:		2–7			
