= 1929 New Hampshire Wildcats football team =

American college football season

1929 New Hampshire Wildcats football
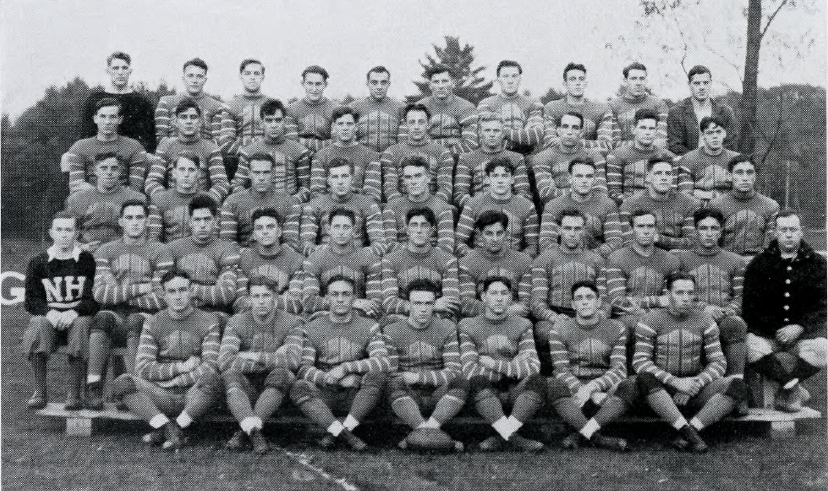
- Conference: New England Conference
- Record: 7–2 (2–0 New England)
- Head coach: Butch Cowell (14th season)
- Captain: John Shea
- Home stadium: Memorial Field

1929 New England Conference football standings
	Conf.					Overall
Team	W		L		T	W		L		T
New Hampshire $	2	–	0	–	0	7	–	2	–	0
Rhode Island State	1	–	1	–	0	5	–	2	–	1
Connecticut	1	–	2	–	0	4	–	4	–	0
Maine	1	–	2	–	0	2	–	5	–	0
Massachusetts	0	–	0	–	0	3	–	4	–	1
$ – Conference champion

The 1929 New Hampshire Wildcats football team was an American football team that represented the University of New Hampshire as a member of the New England Conference during the 1929 college football season. In its 14th season under head coach William "Butch" Cowell, (Note: This was Cowell's 15th year and 14th season as head coach, as the school did not field a team in 1918 due to World War I.) the team compiled a 7–2 record, and outscored their opponents, 162–78. The team played its home games in Durham, New Hampshire, at Memorial Field. (Note: Memorial Field remains in use by the New Hampshire women's field hockey team.)

== Schedule ==
Date	Opponent	Site	Result	Attendance	Source
September 28	at Colby*	Waterville, ME	W 20–7		
October 5	Boston University*	Memorial Field; Durham, NH	W 24–6		
October 12	at Harvard*	Harvard Stadium; Boston, MA	L 0–35		
October 19	at Maine	Alumni Field; Orono, ME (rivalry)	W 21–7		
October 26	Tufts*^{†}	Memorial Field; Durham, NH	W 18–2		
November 2	Lowell Textile* (Note: Lowell Textile is now University of Massachusetts Lowell.)	Memorial Field; Durham, NH	W 52–7		
November 9	at Connecticut	Gardner Dow Field; Storrs, CT	W 7–0	5,000	
November 16	Springfield*	Memorial Field; Durham, NH	W 13–0		
November 23	at Brown*	Brown Stadium; Providence, RI	L 7–14		
*Non-conference game; ^{†}Homecoming; Source:
