= 1934 New Hampshire Wildcats football team =

American college football season

1934 New Hampshire Wildcats football
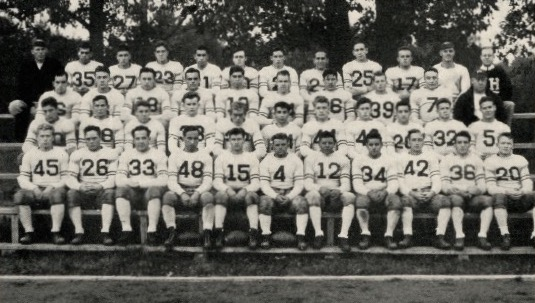
- Conference: New England Conference
- Record: 3–4–2 (1–0 New England)
- Head coach: Butch Cowell (19th season)
- Captain: Thomas M. Clarke
- Home stadium: Memorial Field

1934 New England Conference football standings
	Conf.					Overall
Team	W		L		T	W		L		T
New Hampshire $	1	–	0	–	0	3	–	4	–	2
Rhode Island State	2	–	1	–	0	6	–	3	–	0
Connecticut State	0	–	1	–	0	1	–	7	–	0
Maine	0	–	2	–	0	4	–	3	–	0
$ – Conference champion

The 1934 New Hampshire Wildcats football team was an American football team that represented the University of New Hampshire as a member of the New England Conference during the 1934 college football season. In its 19th season under head coach William "Butch" Cowell, (Note: This was Cowell's 20th year and 19th season as head coach, as the school did not field a team in 1918 due to World War I.) the team played its home games in Durham, New Hampshire, at Memorial Field. (Note: Memorial Field remains in use by the New Hampshire women's field hockey team.) The team compiled a 3–4–2 record, being outscored by their opponents 89–148, while going undefeated at home, registering two wins and two ties in Durham.

== Schedule ==
Date	Opponent	Site	Result	Attendance	Source
September 29	Lowell Textile* (Note: Lowell Textile is now University of Massachusetts Lowell.)	Memorial Field; Durham, NH	W 8–6		
October 6	at Boston University*	Nickerson Field (Note: This was a different venue than the like-named Nickerson Field in Boston, used by BU in later years.); Weston, MA	L 12–13		
October 13	Bates*	Memorial Field; Durham, NH	T 7–7		
October 20	Maine	Memorial Field; Durham, NH (rivalry)	W 24–7		
October 27	Springfield*^{†}	Memorial Field; Durham, NH	T 7–7	3,000	
November 3	at Tufts*	Tufts Oval; Medford, MA	L 0–26	3,500	
November 10	at Dartmouth*	Memorial Field; Hanover, NH (rivalry)	L 7–21	5,000	
November 17	at Harvard*	Harvard Stadium; Boston, MA	L 3–47	15,000	
November 24	at Saint Anselm*	Manchester, NH	W 21–14	8,000	
*Non-conference game; ^{†}Homecoming; Source:

The game against Saint Anselm was the third-ever meeting between the two programs; their prior games had been in 1894 (won by Saint Anselm) and in 1898 (won by New Hampshire). New Hampshire's field goal in the Harvard game was the only time the Wildcats scored against the Crimson in seven games played from 1929 to 1939, as Harvard outscored New Hampshire by a total of 282–3 in those contests. New Hampshire and Dartmouth would not meet again until 1956.
