= Sumner Dole =

American football player and sports coach (1892–1997)

Biographical details
- Born: 1892
- Died: January 22, 1997 (aged 104); Keene, New Hampshire, U.S.

Playing career

Football
- 1914: Massachusetts

Coaching career (HC unless noted)

Football
- 1923–1933: Connecticut

Basketball
- 1917–1918: Massachusetts
- 1923–1927: Connecticut

Baseball
- 1924–1935: Connecticut

Head coaching record
- Overall: 36–39–14 (football); 45–35 (basketball); 64–90–2 (baseball)

Accomplishments and honors

Championships
- Football; 3 New England (1924, 1926, 1928)

Sumner Alvord Dole (1892 – January 22, 1997) was an American football, basketball and baseball and coach. He served as the head football coach at the University of Connecticut from 1923 to 1933, compiling a record of 36–39–14. Dole was also the head basketball coach at the University of Massachusetts from 1917 to 1918 and Connecticut from 1923 to 1927, amassing a career college basketball coaching record of 45–35.

== Head coaching record ==
=== Football ===
Year	Team	Overall	Conference	Standing	Bowl/playoffs
Connecticut / Connecticut State Aggies (New England Conference) (1923–1933)
1923	Connecticut	3–4–1	1–1–1	T–2nd	
1924	Connecticut	6–0–2	3–0	1st	
1925	Connecticut	3–5–1	0–2–1	4th	
1926	Connecticut	7–1	3–1	1st	
1927	Connecticut	5–4	1–2	3rd	
1928	Connecticut	4–1–3	1–0–2	T–1st	
1929	Connecticut	4–4	1–2	T–3rd	
1930	Connecticut	1–5–1	0–2–1	4th	
1931	Connecticut	2–3–3	0–3	4th	
1932	Connecticut	0–6–2	0–2–1	4th	
1933	Connecticut State	1–6–1	0–1	4th	
Connecticut:		36–39–14	9–16–6		
Total:		36–39–14			
National championship Conference title Conference division title or championship game berth
