= 1938 New Hampshire Wildcats football team =

American college football season

1938 New Hampshire Wildcats football
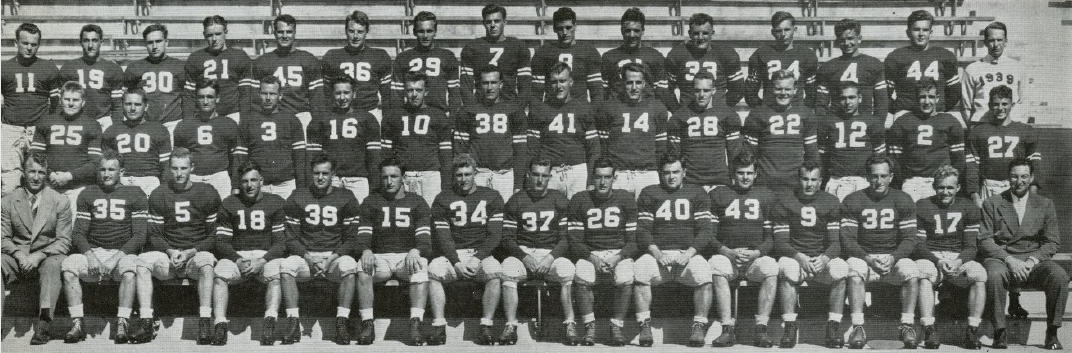
- Conference: New England Conference
- Record: 3–6 (1–1 New England)
- Head coach: George Sauer (2nd season)
- Captain: Paul Horne
- Home stadium: Lewis Field

1938 New England Conference football standings
	Conf.					Overall
Team	W		L		T	W		L		T
Rhode Island State $	2	–	0	–	0	4	–	4	–	0
Maine	2	–	1	–	0	3	–	4	–	0
New Hampshire	1	–	1	–	0	3	–	6	–	0
Northeastern	0	–	0	–	0	3	–	3	–	1
Connecticut State	0	–	3	–	0	4	–	3	–	0
$ – Conference champion

The 1938 New Hampshire Wildcats football team was an American football team that represented the University of New Hampshire as a member of the New England Conference during the 1938 college football season. In its second year under head coach George Sauer, the team compiled a 3–6 record, being outscored by their opponents 112–42. Each of the team's six losses was by shutout, including all four home games. The team played its home games at Lewis Field (also known as Lewis Stadium) in Durham, New Hampshire.

== Schedule ==
Date	Opponent	Site	Result	Attendance	Source
September 24	Lowell Textile* (Note: Lowell Textile is now University of Massachusetts Lowell.)	Lewis Field; Durham, NH	L 0–20		
October 1	at Bates*	Garcelon Field; Lewiston, ME	W 22–6		
October 8	Maine	Lewis Field; Durham, NH (rivalry)	L 0–21	600	
October 15	at Colby*	Seaverns Field; Waterville, ME	L 0–6		
October 22	at Vermont*	Centennial Field; Burlington, VT	L 0–20	2,500	
October 29	Saint Anselm*	Lewis Field; Durham, NH	L 0–26		
November 5	at Tufts*	Tufts Oval; Medford, MA	W 10–6		
November 12	Springfield}*^{†}	Lewis Field; Durham, NH	L 0–7	6,000	
November 19	at Connecticut State	Gardner Dow Field; Storrs, CT	W 10–0		
*Non-conference game; ^{†}Homecoming; Source:

Lowell Textile's win over New Hampshire snapped a 22-game losing streak the Millmen were on, dating back to October 1935. In 16 contests between New Hampshire and Lowell Textile, played during 1912–1941, the 1938 game was the only Wildcat loss.

Team captain Paul Horne set two Wildcat records in the Saint Anselm game, which still stand; most punts in a game (17) and most punting yardage in a game (527).
