= Charles McGeoch =

American football player and coach (1899–1985)

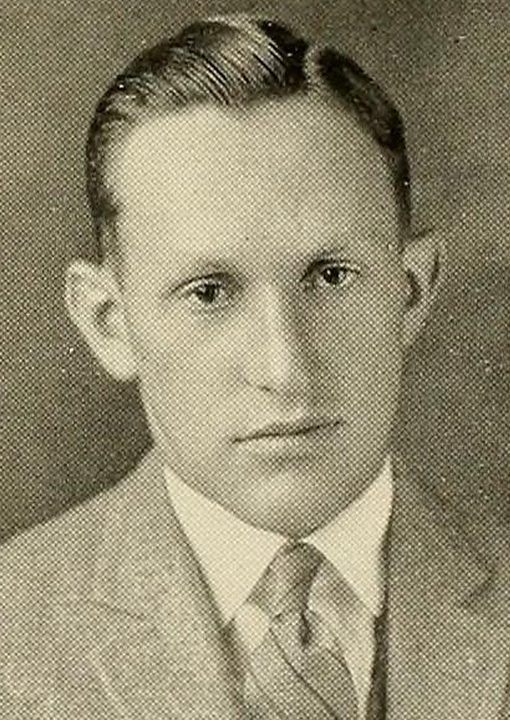
- McGeoch pictured in Index 1925, UMass yearbook

Biographical details
- Born: September 12, 1899; Bridgewater, Massachusetts, U.S.
- Died: May 25, 1985 (aged 85); Lawrence, Massachusetts, U.S.

Playing career
- 1922–1924: Massachusetts

Coaching career (HC unless noted)
- c. 1925: Salisbury School (CT)
- 1928–1930: Massachusetts
- 1931: Malden HS (MA)

Head coaching record
- Overall: 6–17–2 (college)

Charles Ryerson McGeoch (September 12, 1899 – May 25, 1985) was an American football player and coach. He served as the head football coach at Massachusetts Agricultural College—now the University of Massachusetts Amherst from 1928 to 1930, compiling record of 6–17–2.

McGeoch attended the Northfield Mount Hermon School in Gill, Massachusetts and then Massachusetts Agricultural College, where he played college football from 1922 to 1924. After graduating, he coached at the Salisbury School in Salisbury, Connecticut. In 1931, McGeoch was hired as an assistant coach at Malden High School in Malden, Massachusetts to work under head coach Warren McGuirk.

== Head coaching record ==
=== College ===
Year	Team	Overall	Conference	Standing	Bowl/playoffs
Massachusetts Aggies (Independent) (1928–1930)
1928	Massachusetts	2–5–1			
1929	Massachusetts	3–4–1			
1930	Massachusetts	1–8			
Massachusetts:		6–17–2			
Total:		6–17–2			
