= 1923 Rhode Island State Rams football team =

American college football season

1923 Rhode Island State Rams football
- Conference: New England Conference
- Record: 1–5–1 (0–3 New England)
- Head coach: Frank Keaney (4th season)

1923 New England Conference football standings
	Conf.					Overall
Team	W		L		T	W		L		T
Maine $	3	–	0	–	0	5	–	3	–	0
New Hampshire	1	–	1	–	1	4	–	4	–	1
Connecticut	1	–	1	–	1	3	–	4	–	1
Rhode Island State	0	–	3	–	0	1	–	5	–	1
Massachusetts	0	–	0	–	0	2	–	5	–	0
$ – Conference champion

The 1923 Rhode Island Rams football team was an American football team that represented Rhode Island State College (later renamed the University of Rhode Island) as a member of the New England Conference during the 1923 college football season. In its fourth season under head coach Frank Keaney, the team compiled a 4–4 record (0–3 against conference opponents) and finished in last place in the conference. The team failed to score in seven of its eight games.

== Schedule ==
Date	Opponent	Site	Result	Source
September 22	at Maine	Orono, ME	L 0–14	
October 6	at Harvard*	Harvard Stadium; Boston, MA	L 0–35	
October 13	at New Hampshire	Memorial Field; Durham, NH	L 0–13	
October 27	at NYU*	Ohio Field; Bronx, NY	L 0–21	
November 3	at Worcester Tech*	Worcester, MA	T 0–0	
November 10	Coast Guard*	Kingston, RI	W 13–0	
November 17	Connecticut	Kingston, RI (rivalry)	L 0–7	
*Non-conference game
