= 1938 Maine Black Bears football team =

American college football season

1938 Maine Black Bears football
- Conference: New England Conference, Maine Intercollegiate Athletic Association
- Record: 3–4 (2–1 New England, 1–2 MIAA)
- Head coach: Fred Brice (18th season)
- Captain: Dana Drew
- Home stadium: Alumni Field

1938 New England Conference football standings
	Conf.					Overall
Team	W		L		T	W		L		T
Rhode Island State $	2	–	0	–	0	4	–	4	–	0
Maine	2	–	1	–	0	3	–	4	–	0
New Hampshire	1	–	1	–	0	3	–	6	–	0
Northeastern	0	–	0	–	0	3	–	3	–	1
Connecticut State	0	–	3	–	0	4	–	3	–	0
$ – Conference champion

The 1938 Maine Black Bears football team was an American football team that represented the University of Maine as a member of the New England Conference and Maine Intercollegiate Athletic Association during the 1938 college football season. In its 18th season under head coach Fred Brice, the team compiled a 3–4 record (2–1 against New England conference and 1–2 against MIAA opponents). The team played its home games at Alumni Field in Orono, Maine. Dana Drew was the team captain.

== Schedule ==
Date	Opponent	Site	Result	Attendance	Source
September 24	Rhode Island State	Alumni Field; Orono, ME	L 6–14		
October 1	at NYU*	Ohio Field; Bronx, NY	L 0–19	10,000	
October 8	at New Hampshire	Lewis Field; Durham, NH (rivalry)	W 21–0	600	
October 15	Connecticut State	Alumni Field; Orono, ME	W 13–0		
October 22	Bates	Alumni Field; Orono, ME	W 23–6		
October 29	Colby	Alumni Field; Orono, ME	L 14–19		
November 5	at Bowdoin	Whittier Field; Brunswick, ME	L 6–13		
*Non-conference game
