= 1923 Massachusetts Aggies football team =

American college football season

1923 Massachusetts Aggies football
- Conference: New England Conference
- Record: 2–5 (0–0 New England)
- Head coach: Harold Gore (5th season)
- Home stadium: Alumni Field

1923 New England Conference football standings
	Conf.					Overall
Team	W		L		T	W		L		T
Maine $	3	–	0	–	0	5	–	3	–	0
New Hampshire	1	–	1	–	1	4	–	4	–	1
Connecticut	1	–	1	–	1	3	–	4	–	1
Rhode Island State	0	–	3	–	0	1	–	5	–	1
Massachusetts	0	–	0	–	0	2	–	5	–	0
$ – Conference champion

The 1923 Massachusetts Aggies football team represented Massachusetts Agricultural College in the 1923 college football season. The team was coached by Harold Gore and played its home games at Alumni Field in Amherst, Massachusetts. Massachusetts finished the season with a record of 2–5. The Aggies were charter members of the newly established New England Conference, although they did not face any in-conference opponents this season.

== Schedule ==
Date	Opponent	Site	Result
September 29	RPI*	Alumni Field; Amherst, MA	L 7–9
October 6	at Bates*	Garcelon Field; Lewiston, ME	L 6–7
October 20	at Amherst*	Pratt Field; Amherst, MA	L 3–7
October 27	at Wesleyan*	Andrus Field; Middletown, CT	W 13–0
November 3	at Williams*	Weston Field; Williamstown, MA	L 0–25
November 10	Stevens*	Alumni Field; Amherst, MA	W 25–7
November 17	Tufts*	Alumni Field; Amherst, MA	L 7–10
*Non-conference game
