= 1926 Rhode Island State Rams football team =

American college football season

1926 Rhode Island State Rams football
- Conference: New England Conference
- Record: 1–6 (0–3 New England)
- Head coach: Frank Keaney (7th season)

1926 New England Conference football standings
	Conf.					Overall
Team	W		L		T	W		L		T
Connecticut $	3	–	1	–	0	7	–	1	–	0
Maine	2	–	1	–	0	7	–	1	–	0
New Hampshire	2	–	1	–	0	4	–	4	–	0
Massachusetts	0	–	1	–	0	1	–	6	–	0
Rhode Island State	0	–	3	–	0	1	–	6	–	0
$ – Conference champion

The 1926 Rhode Island Rams football team was an American football team that represented Rhode Island State College (later renamed the University of Rhode Island) as a member of the New England Conference during the 1926 college football season. In its seventh season under head coach Frank Keaney, the team compiled a 1–6 record (0–3 against conference opponents) and finished in last place in the conference.

== Schedule ==
Date	Opponent	Site	Result	Source
September 26	at Brown*	Brown Stadium; Providence, RI (rivalry)	L 0–14	
October 2	Maine	Kingston, RI	L 0–7	
October 8	at Lowell Textile*	Lowell MA	L 0–7	
October 16	New Hampshire^{†}	Kingston, RI	L 6–7	
October 23	at CCNY*	Lewisohn Stadium; New York, NY	L 0–29	
November 6	Worcester Tech*	Kingston, RI	W 26–7	
November 13	at Connecticut	Gardner Dow Athletic Fields; Storrs, CT (rivalry)	L 0–33	
*Non-conference game; ^{†}Homecoming
