= 1924 Rhode Island State Rams football team =

American college football season

1924 Rhode Island State Rams football
- Conference: New England Conference
- Record: 0–7 (0–3 New England)
- Head coach: Frank Keaney (5th season)

1924 New England Conference football standings
	Conf.					Overall
Team	W		L		T	W		L		T
Connecticut $	4	–	0	–	0	6	–	0	–	2
New Hampshire	2	–	1	–	0	7	–	2	–	0
Maine	1	–	2	–	0	4	–	3	–	1
Massachusetts	0	–	1	–	0	6	–	1	–	1
Rhode Island State	0	–	3	–	0	0	–	7	–	0
$ – Conference champion

The 1924 Rhode Island Rams football team was an American football team that represented Rhode Island State College (later renamed the University of Rhode Island) as a member of the New England Conference during the 1924 college football season. In its fifth season under head coach Frank Keaney, the team compiled a 0–7 record (0–3 against conference opponents) and finished in last place in the conference.

== Schedule ==
Date	Opponent	Site	Result	Attendance
September 27	Maine	Kingston, RI	L 0–37	
October 11	New Hampshire	Kingston, RI	L 6–17	
October 18	at Lowell Textile*	Lowell, MA	L 0–6	
October 25	at CCNY*	Lewisohn Stadium; New York, NY	L 0–13	
November 1	Worcester Tech^{†}*	Kingston, RI	L 9–14	
November 8	at Bates*	Lewiston, ME	L 7–13	
November 15	at Connecticut	Storrs, CT (rivalry)	L 0–22	
*Non-conference game; ^{†}Homecoming
