= 1929 Connecticut Aggies football team =

American college football season

1929 Connecticut Aggies football
- Conference: New England Conference
- Record: 4–4 (1–2 New England)
- Head coach: Sumner Dole (7th season)
- Home stadium: Gardner Dow Athletic Fields

1929 New England Conference football standings
	Conf.					Overall
Team	W		L		T	W		L		T
New Hampshire $	2	–	0	–	0	7	–	2	–	0
Rhode Island State	1	–	1	–	0	5	–	2	–	1
Connecticut	1	–	2	–	0	4	–	4	–	0
Maine	1	–	2	–	0	2	–	5	–	0
Massachusetts	0	–	0	–	0	3	–	4	–	1
$ – Conference champion

The 1929 Connecticut Aggies football team was an American football team that represented Connecticut Agricultural College, now the University of Connecticut, in the New England Conference during the 1929 college football season. The Aggies were led by seventh-year head coach Sumner Dole, and completed the season with a record of 4–4. The team played its home games at Gardner Dow Athletic Fields in Storrs, Connecticut.

== Schedule ==
Date	Opponent	Site	Result	Attendance	Source
September 28	at Amherst*	Pratt Field; Amherst, MA	L 0–7		
October 5	at Wesleyan*	Andrus Field; Middletown, CT	W 13–0		
October 12	Maine	Gardner Dow Athletic Fields; Storrs, CT	W 20–7		
October 19	at Tufts*	Medford, MA	L 0–7		
October 26	Coast Guard*	Gardner Dow Field; Storrs, CT	W 19–0		
November 2	Vermont*	Gardner Dow Athletic Fields; Storrs, CT	W 34–0		
November 9	New Hampshire^{†}	Gardner Dow Athletic Fields; Storrs, CT	L 0–7	5,000	
November 16	at Rhode Island State	Meade Stadium; Kingston, RI (rivalry)	L 6–19	3,500	
*Non-conference game; ^{†}Homecoming
