= 1929 Maine Black Bears football team =

American college football team

1929 Maine Black Bears football
- Conference: New England Conference, Maine Intercollegiate Athletic Association
- Record: 2–5 (1–2 New England, 1–2 MIAA)
- Head coach: Fred Brice (9th season)
- Home stadium: Alumni Field

1929 New England Conference football standings
| | Conf. | | | | | Overall |
| Team | W | | L | | T | W | | L | | T |
|---|---|---|---|---|---|---|---|---|---|---|
| New Hampshire $ | 2 | – | 0 | – | 0 | 7 | – | 2 | – | 0 |
| Rhode Island State | 1 | – | 1 | – | 0 | 5 | – | 2 | – | 1 |
| Connecticut | 1 | – | 2 | – | 0 | 4 | – | 4 | – | 0 |
| Maine | 1 | – | 2 | – | 0 | 2 | – | 5 | – | 0 |
| Massachusetts | 0 | – | 0 | – | 0 | 3 | – | 4 | – | 1 |
$ – Conference champion

The 1929 Maine Black Bears football team was an American football team that represented the University of Maine as a member of the New England Conference and Maine Intercollegiate Athletic Association during the 1929 college football season. In its ninth season under head coach Fred Brice, the team compiled a 2–5 record (1–2 against New England and 1–2 against MIAA conference opponents). The team played its home games at Alumni Field in Orono, Maine. Lavon Zakarian was the team captain.

== Schedule ==
| Date | Time | Opponent | Site | Result | Source |
|---|---|---|---|---|---|
| September 28 | | Rhode Island State | Alumni Field; Orono, ME | W 6–0 | |
| October 5 | 2:00 p.m. | at Boston College* | Fenway Park; Boston, MA | L 0–42 | |
| October 12 | | at Connecticut | Gardner Dow Athletic Fields; Storrs, CT | L 7–20 | |
| October 19 | | New Hampshire | Alumni Field; Orono, ME (rivalry) | L 7–21 | |
| October 26 | | at Bates | Garcelon Field; Lewiston, ME | L 0–6 | |
| November 2 | | at Colby* | Seaverns Field; Waterville, ME | L 7–13 | |
| November 9 | | Bowdoin | Alumni Field; Orono, ME | W 25–6 | |
*Non-conference game; All times are in Eastern time
