= 1930 Maine Black Bears football team =

American college football season

1930 Maine Black Bears football
- Conference: New England Conference, Maine Intercollegiate Athletic Association
- Record: 3–4 (2–1 New England, 1–2 MIAA)
- Head coach: Fred Brice (10th season)
- Home stadium: Alumni Field

1930 New England Conference football standings
	Conf.					Overall
Team	W		L		T	W		L		T
New Hampshire $	2	–	0	–	0	5	–	2	–	1
Maine	2	–	1	–	0	3	–	4	–	0
Rhode Island State	0	–	1	–	1	5	–	2	–	1
Connecticut	0	–	2	–	1	1	–	5	–	1
$ – Conference champion; Dubious – Discuss

The 1930 Maine Black Bears football team was an American football team that represented the University of Maine as a member of the New England Conference and Maine Intercollegiate Athletic Association during the 1930 college football season. In its tenth season under head coach Fred Brice, the team compiled a 3–4 record (2–1 against New England and 1–2 against MIAA conference opponents). The team played its home games at Alumni Field in Orono, Maine. Cecil Horne was the team captain.

== Schedule ==
Date	Opponent	Site	Result	Attendance	Source
September 27	at Yale*	Yale Bowl; New Haven, CT	L 0–38	21,000	
October 4	Rhode Island State	Alumni Field; Orono, ME	W 13–12		
October 11	Connecticut	Alumni Field; Orono, ME	W 13–0		
October 18	at New Hampshire	Durham, NH (rivalry)	L 6–14		
October 25	Bates	Alumni Field; Orono, ME	L 0–2		
November 1	Colby	Alumni Field; Orono, ME	W 14–6		
November 8	at Bowdoin	Whittier Field; Brunswick, ME	L 7–13		
*Non-conference game
