= 1924 Massachusetts Aggies football team =

American college football season

1924 Massachusetts Aggies football
- Conference: New England Conference
- Record: 6–1–1 (0–1 New England)
- Head coach: Harold Gore (6th season)
- Home stadium: Alumni Field

1924 New England Conference football standings
	Conf.					Overall
Team	W		L		T	W		L		T
Connecticut $	4	–	0	–	0	6	–	0	–	2
New Hampshire	2	–	1	–	0	7	–	2	–	0
Maine	1	–	2	–	0	4	–	3	–	1
Massachusetts	0	–	1	–	0	6	–	1	–	1
Rhode Island State	0	–	3	–	0	0	–	7	–	0
$ – Conference champion

The 1924 Massachusetts Aggies football team represented Massachusetts Agricultural College in the 1924 college football season. The team was coached by Harold Gore and played its home games at Alumni Field in Amherst, Massachusetts. Massachusetts finished the season with an overall record of 6–1–1, and a New England Conference record of 0–1, losing to rival Connecticut.

== Schedule ==
Date	Opponent	Site	Result	Attendance	Source
September 27	Connecticut	Alumni Field; Amherst, MA (rivalry)	L 10–12		
October 4	Bates*	Alumni Field; Amherst, MA	W 19–6		
October 11	at Norwich*	Sabine Field; Northfield, VT	W 41–0		
October 18	at Worcester Tech*	Alumni Field; Worcester, MA	W 54–13		
October 25	Wesleyan*	Alumni Field; Amherst, MA	W 14–13		
November 1	Amherst*	Alumni Field; Amherst, MA	W 17–7		
November 8	at Stevens*	Hoboken, NJ	W 23–3		
November 22	at Tufts	Tufts Oval; Medford, MA	T 7–7	3,000	
*Non-conference game
