= 1926 Massachusetts Aggies football team =

American college football season

1926 Massachusetts Aggies football
- Conference: New England Conference
- Record: 1–6 (0–1 New England)
- Head coach: Harold Gore (8th season)
- Home stadium: Alumni Field

1926 New England Conference football standings
| | Conf. | | | | | Overall |
| Team | W | | L | | T | W | | L | | T |
|---|---|---|---|---|---|---|---|---|---|---|
| Connecticut $ | 3 | – | 1 | – | 0 | 7 | – | 1 | – | 0 |
| Maine | 2 | – | 1 | – | 0 | 7 | – | 1 | – | 0 |
| New Hampshire | 2 | – | 1 | – | 0 | 4 | – | 4 | – | 0 |
| Massachusetts | 0 | – | 1 | – | 0 | 1 | – | 6 | – | 0 |
| Rhode Island State | 0 | – | 3 | – | 0 | 1 | – | 6 | – | 0 |
$ – Conference champion

The 1926 Massachusetts Aggies football team represented Massachusetts Agricultural College as a member of the New England Conference during the 1926 college football season. The team was coached by Harold Gore and played its home games at Alumni Field in Amherst, Massachusetts. Massachusetts finished the season with a record of 1–6.

== Schedule ==
| Date | Opponent | Site | Result | Source |
|---|---|---|---|---|
| October 2 | Bates* | Alumni Field; Amherst, MA | L 0–2 | |
| October 9 | Connecticut | Alumni Field; Amherst, MA (rivalry) | L 6–13 | |
| October 16 | at Williams* | Weston Field; Williamstown, MA | L 0–20 | |
| October 23 | Worcester Tech* | Alumni Field; Amherst, MA | W 7–0 | |
| October 30 | Amherst* | Alumni Field; Amherst, MA | L 7–21 | |
| November 6 | at Springfield* | Pratt Field; Springfield, MA | L 0–9 | |
| November 20 | at Tufts* | Tufts Oval; Somerville, MA | L 13–45 | |
*Non-conference game
