= 1926 Maine Black Bears football team =

American college football season

1926 Maine Black Bears football

MIAA champion
- Conference: New England Conference, Maine Intercollegiate Athletic Association
- Record: 7–1 (2–1 New England, 3–0 MIAA)
- Head coach: Fred Brice (6th season)
- Home stadium: Alumni Field

1926 New England Conference football standings
	Conf.					Overall
Team	W		L		T	W		L		T
Connecticut $	3	–	1	–	0	7	–	1	–	0
Maine	2	–	1	–	0	7	–	1	–	0
New Hampshire	2	–	1	–	0	4	–	4	–	0
Massachusetts	0	–	1	–	0	1	–	6	–	0
Rhode Island State	0	–	3	–	0	1	–	6	–	0
$ – Conference champion

The 1926 Maine Black Bears football team was an American football team that represented the University of Maine as a member of the New England Conference and Maine Intercollegiate Athletic Association during the 1926 college football season. In its sixth season under head coach Fred Brice, the team compiled a 7–1 record and played its home games at Alumni Field in Orono, Maine. Paul Lamoreau was the team captain.

== Schedule ==
Date	Opponent	Site	Result	Source
September 25	Fort Williams*	Alumni Field; Orono, ME	W 7–6	
October 2	at Rhode Island State	Kingston, RI	W 7–0	
October 9	at Middlebury*	Middlebury, VT	W 34–0	
October 16	Connecticut	Alumni Field; Orono, ME	W 21–0	
October 23	Bates	Alumni Field; Orono, ME	W 33–0	
October 30	Colby	Alumni Field; Orono, ME	W 7–6	
November 6	at Bowdoin	Whittier Field; Brunswick, ME	W 21–6	
November 13	at New Hampshire	Memorial Field; Durham, NH (rivalry)	L 7–14	
*Non-conference game
