= 1923 Maine Black Bears football team =

American college football season

1923 Maine Black Bears football

New England champion
- Conference: New England Conference, Maine Intercollegiate Athletic Association
- Record: 5–3 (3–0 New England, 2–1 MIAA)
- Head coach: Fred Brice (3rd season)
- Captain: Henry Small
- Home stadium: Alumni Stadium

1923 New England Conference football standings
	Conf.					Overall
Team	W		L		T	W		L		T
Maine $	3	–	0	–	0	5	–	3	–	0
New Hampshire	1	–	1	–	1	4	–	4	–	1
Connecticut	1	–	1	–	1	3	–	4	–	1
Rhode Island State	0	–	3	–	0	1	–	5	–	1
Massachusetts	0	–	0	–	0	2	–	5	–	0
$ – Conference champion

The 1923 Maine Black Bears football team was an American football team that represented the University of Maine as a member of the New England Conference and the Maine Intercollegiate Athletic Association during the 1923 college football season. In its third season under head coach Fred Brice, the team compiled a 5–3 record (3–0 against New England and 2–1 against MIAA conference opponents) and won the New England Conference championship. Henry Small was the team captain.

== Schedule ==
Date	Time	Opponent	Site	Result	Source
September 22		Rhode Island State	Alumni Stadium; Orono, ME	W 14–0	
September 29		at Vermont*	Centennial Field; Burlington, VT	L 6–7	
October 6		at Dartmouth*	Memorial Field; Hanover, NH	L 0–6	
October 13		at Connecticut	Gardner Dow Athletic Fields; Storrs, CT	W 7–0	
October 20		Bates	Alumni Stadium; Orono, ME	W 12–7	
October 27		at Colby	Seaverns Field; Waterville, ME	L 0–7	
November 3		Bowdoin	Alumni Stadium; Orono, ME	W 28–6	
November 10	2:00 p.m.	vs. New Hampshire	Bayside Park; Portland, ME (rivalry)	W 13–0	
*Non-conference game; All times are in Eastern time
