= 1933 Maine Black Bears football team =

American college football season

1933 Maine Black Bears football

MIAA champion
- Conference: New England Conference, Maine Intercollegiate Athletic Association
- Record: 4–3 (0–2 New England, 3–0 MIAA)
- Head coach: Fred Brice (13th season)
- Home stadium: Alumni Field

1933 New England Conference football standings
	Conf.					Overall
Team	W		L		T	W		L		T
Rhode Island State $	2	–	0	–	0	6	–	2	–	0
New Hampshire	1	–	0	–	0	3	–	3	–	1
Connecticut State	0	–	1	–	0	1	–	6	–	1
Maine	0	–	2	–	0	4	–	3	–	0
$ – Conference champion

The 1933 Maine Black Bears football team was an American football team that represented the University of Maine as a member of the New England Conference and Maine Intercollegiate Athletic Association during the 1933 college football season. In its 13th season under head coach Fred Brice, the team compiled a 4–3 record (0–2 against New England and 3–0 against MIAA conference opponents). The team played its home games at Alumni Field in Orono, Maine. Phillip Parsons was the team captain.

== Schedule ==
Date	Opponent	Site	Result	Source
September 30	Rhode Island State	Alumni Field; Orono, ME	L 0–6	
October 7	at Yale*	Yale Bowl; New Haven, CT	L 7–14	
October 14	Lowell Textile*	Alumni Field; Orono, ME	W 14–0	
October 21	New Hampshire	Alumni Field; Orono, ME (rivalry)	L 0–6	
October 28	at Bates	Garcelon Field; Lewiston, ME	W 12–7	
November 4	at Colby	Seaverns Field; Waterville, ME	W 18–7	
November 11	Bowdoin	Alumni Field; Orono, ME	W 12–0	
*Non-conference game
