= 1929 Rhode Island State Rams football team =

American college football season

1929 Rhode Island State Rams football
- Conference: New England Conference
- Record: 5–2–1 (1–1 New England)
- Head coach: Frank Keaney (10th season)

1929 New England Conference football standings
	Conf.					Overall
Team	W		L		T	W		L		T
New Hampshire $	2	–	0	–	0	7	–	2	–	0
Rhode Island State	1	–	1	–	0	5	–	2	–	1
Connecticut	1	–	2	–	0	4	–	4	–	0
Maine	1	–	2	–	0	2	–	5	–	0
Massachusetts	0	–	0	–	0	3	–	4	–	1
$ – Conference champion

The 1929 Rhode Island Rams football team was an American football team that represented Rhode Island State College (later renamed the University of Rhode Island) as a member of the New England Conference during the 1929 college football season. In its tenth season under head coach Frank Keaney, the team compiled a 5–2–1 record (1–1 against conference opponents) and tied for third place in the conference.

== Schedule ==
Date	Opponent	Site	Result	Attendance
September 21	Arnold*	Kingston, RI	W 19–0	
September 28	at Maine	Alumni Field; Orono, ME	L 0–6	
October 5	at Brown*	Providence, RI (rivalry)	L 6–14	
October 19	at Bates*		T 6–6	
October 26	Lowell Textile*	Kingston, RI	W 26–7	
November 2	at Coast Guard*	New London, CT	W 26–0	
November 9	at Worcester Tech*		W 39–0	
November 16	Connecticut^{†}	Kingston, RI (rivalry)	W 19–6	
*Non-conference game; ^{†}Homecoming
