= 1929 Massachusetts Aggies football team =

American college football season

1929 Massachusetts Aggies football
- Conference: New England Conference
- Record: 3–4–1 (0–0 New England)
- Head coach: Charles McGeoch (2nd season)
- Home stadium: Alumni Field

1929 New England Conference football standings
	Conf.					Overall
Team	W		L		T	W		L		T
New Hampshire $	2	–	0	–	0	7	–	2	–	0
Rhode Island State	1	–	1	–	0	5	–	2	–	1
Connecticut	1	–	2	–	0	4	–	4	–	0
Maine	1	–	2	–	0	2	–	5	–	0
Massachusetts	0	–	0	–	0	3	–	4	–	1
$ – Conference champion

The 1929 Massachusetts Aggies football team represented Massachusetts Agricultural College in the 1929 college football season. The Aggies were members of the New England Conference, but did not face any conference opponents this season. The team was coached by Charles McGeoch and played its home games at Alumni Field in Amherst, Massachusetts. Massachusetts finished the season with a record of 3–4–1.

== Schedule ==
Date	Opponent	Site	Result
September 28	at Bates*	Garcelon Field; Lewiston, ME	W 7–6
October 5	Bowdoin*	Alumni Field; Amherst, MA	L 6–18
October 12	Middlebury*	Alumni Field; Amherst, MA	L 12–14
October 19	Norwich*	Alumni Stadium; Amherst, MA	W 12–6
October 26	at Worcester Tech*	Alumni Field; Worcester, MA	W 19–12
November 2	at Amherst*	Pratt Field; Amherst, MA	L 0–13
November 9	at Springfield*	Pratt Field; Springfield, MA	L 0–13
November 23	Tufts*	Alumni Field; Amherst, MA	T 0–0
*Non-conference game
