= 1936 Rhode Island State Rams football team =

American college football season

1936 Rhode Island State Rams football
- Conference: New England Conference
- Record: 5–4 (1–2 New England)
- Head coach: Frank Keaney (17th season)

1936 New England Conference football standings
	Conf.					Overall
Team	W		L		T	W		L		T
Connecticut State $	2	–	0	–	0	7	–	2	–	0
Maine	1	–	1	–	0	4	–	3	–	0
Rhode Island State	1	–	2	–	0	5	–	4	–	0
New Hampshire	0	–	1	–	0	3	–	3	–	2
$ – Conference champion

The 1936 Rhode Island Rams football team was an American football team that represented Rhode Island State College (later renamed the University of Rhode Island) as a member of the New England Conference during the 1936 college football season. In its 17th season under head coach Frank Keaney, the team compiled a 5–4 record (1–2 against conference opponents) and finished in third place in the conference. The team played its home games at Meade Stadium with the exception of two night games played at Cranston Stadium.

== Schedule ==
Date	Opponent	Site	Result
September 19	American International*		W 38–0
September 26	at Maine		W 7–0
October 3	at Brown*	Providence, RI (rivalry)	L 6–7
October 10	Tufts*		W 7–0
October 17	vs. Massachusetts*	Cranston Stadium; Cranston, RI	L 8–13
October 24	at Northeastern*		L 12–15
October 31	Worcester Tech^{†}*		W 19–0
November 7	at Connecticut	Storrs, CT (rivalry)	L 0–33
November 13	at Providence*	Cranston Stadium; Cranston, RI	W 19–0
*Non-conference game; ^{†}Homecoming
