= 1924 Maine Black Bears football team =

American college football season

1924 Maine Black Bears football

MIAA champion
- Conference: New England Conference, Maine Intercollegiate Athletic Association
- Record: 4–3–1 (1–2 New England, 2–0–1 MIAA)
- Head coach: Fred Brice (4th season)
- Home stadium: Alumni Field

1924 New England Conference football standings
	Conf.					Overall
Team	W		L		T	W		L		T
Connecticut $	4	–	0	–	0	6	–	0	–	2
New Hampshire	2	–	1	–	0	7	–	2	–	0
Maine	1	–	2	–	0	4	–	3	–	1
Massachusetts	0	–	1	–	0	6	–	1	–	1
Rhode Island State	0	–	3	–	0	0	–	7	–	0
$ – Conference champion

The 1924 Maine Black Bears football team was an American football team that represented the University of Maine as a member of the New England Conference and the Maine Intercollegiate Athletic Association during the 1924 college football season. In its fourth season under head coach Fred Brice, the team compiled a 4–3–1 record (1–2 against New England and 2–0–1 against MIAA conference opponents) and played its home games at Alumni Field in Orono, Maine. George Gruhn was the team captain.

== Schedule ==
Date	Opponent	Site	Result	Attendance	Source
September 27	at Rhode Island State	Kingston, RI	W 37–0		
October 4	Boston University*	Alumni Field; Orono, ME	L 0–6		
October 11	Connecticut	Alumni Field; Orono, ME	L 0–3		
October 18	Bates	Alumni Field; Orono, ME	W 20–0		
October 25	Colby	Alumni Field; Orono, ME	W 12–0		
November 1	at Bowdoin	Whittier Field; Brunswick, ME	T 0–0		
November 8	at New Hampshire	Memorial Field; Durham, NH (rivalry)	L 0–32	4,000+	
November 15	Tufts*	Alumni Field; Orono, ME	W 14–13		
*Non-conference game
