= 1936 Maine Black Bears football team =

American college football season

1936 Maine Black Bears football
- Conference: New England Conference, Maine Intercollegiate Athletic Association
- Record: 4–3 (1–1 New England, 2–1 MIAA)
- Head coach: Fred Brice (16th season)
- Captain: Morris Procter
- Home stadium: Alumni Field

1936 New England Conference football standings
	Conf.					Overall
Team	W		L		T	W		L		T
Connecticut State $	2	–	0	–	0	7	–	2	–	0
Maine	1	–	1	–	0	4	–	3	–	0
Rhode Island State	1	–	2	–	0	5	–	4	–	0
New Hampshire	0	–	1	–	0	3	–	3	–	2
$ – Conference champion

The 1936 Maine Black Bears football team was an American football team that represented the University of Maine as a member of the New England Conference and Maine Intercollegiate Athletic Association during the 1936 college football season. In its 16th season under head coach Fred Brice, the team compiled a 4–3 record (1–1 against New England conference and 2–1 against MIAA opponents). The team played its home games at Alumni Field in Orono, Maine. Morris Procter was the team captain.

== Schedule ==
Date	Opponent	Site	Result	Attendance	Source
September 26	Rhode Island State	Alumni Field; Orono, ME	L 0–7		
October 3	at Columbia*	Baker Field; New York, NY	L 0–34	7,000	
October 10	at New Hampshire	Lewis Field; Durham, NH (rivalry)	W 27–6		
October 17	Lowell Textile*	Alumni Field; Orono, ME	W 21–0		
October 24	Bates	Alumni Field; Orono, ME	W 21–19		
October 31	Colby	Alumni Field; Orono, ME	W 14–7		
November 7	at Bowdoin	Whittier Field; Brunswick, ME	L 7–14	10,000	
*Non-conference game
