= 1938 Connecticut State Huskies football team =

American college football season

1938 Connecticut State Huskies football
- Conference: New England Conference
- Record: 4–3 (0–3 New England)
- Head coach: J. Orlean Christian (5th season)
- Home stadium: Gardner Dow Athletic Fields

1938 New England Conference football standings
	Conf.					Overall
Team	W		L		T	W		L		T
Rhode Island State $	2	–	0	–	0	4	–	4	–	0
Maine	2	–	1	–	0	3	–	4	–	0
New Hampshire	1	–	1	–	0	3	–	6	–	0
Northeastern	0	–	0	–	0	3	–	3	–	1
Connecticut State	0	–	3	–	0	4	–	3	–	0
$ – Conference champion

The 1938 Connecticut State Huskies football team represented Connecticut State College, now the University of Connecticut, in the 1938 college football season. The Huskies were led by fifth-year head coach J. Orlean Christian and completed the season with a record of 4–3.

== Schedule ==
Date	Opponent	Site	Result	Source
October 1	Wesleyan*	Gardner Dow Athletic Fields; Storrs, CT	W 13–6	
October 8	Massachusetts State*	Gardner Dow Athletic Fields; Storrs, CT (rivalry)	W 19–0	
October 15	at Maine	Alumni Field; Orono, ME	L 0–13	
October 29	at Middlebury*	Porter Field; Middlebury, VT	W 13–0	
November 5	Rhode Island State	Gardner Dow Athletic Fields; Storrs, CT (rivalry)	L 20–21	
November 12	at Coast Guard*	Cadet Memorial Field; New London, CT	W 25–6	
November 19	New Hampshire	Gardner Dow Athletic Fields; Storrs, CT	L 0–10	
*Non-conference game
