= 1933 Rhode Island State Rams football team =

American college football season

1933 Rhode Island State Rams football

New England champion
- Conference: New England Conference
- Record: 6–2 (2–0 New England)
- Head coach: Frank Keaney (14th season)

1933 New England Conference football standings
	Conf.					Overall
Team	W		L		T	W		L		T
Rhode Island State $	2	–	0	–	0	6	–	2	–	0
New Hampshire	1	–	0	–	0	3	–	3	–	1
Connecticut State	0	–	1	–	0	1	–	6	–	1
Maine	0	–	2	–	0	4	–	3	–	0
$ – Conference champion

The 1933 Rhode Island Rams football team was an American football team that represented Rhode Island State College (later renamed the University of Rhode Island) as a member of the New England Conference during the 1933 college football season. In its 14th season under head coach Frank Keaney, the team compiled a 6–2 record (2–0 against conference opponents) and won the conference championship.

== Schedule ==
Date	Opponent	Site	Result	Source
September 23	Brooklyn*	Kingston, RI	W 12–0	
September 30	at Maine	Orono, ME	W 6–0	
October 7	at Brown*	Brown Stadium; Providence, RI (rivalry)	L 0–26	
October 14	Arnold*	Kingston, RI	W 13–6	
October 21	Massachusetts State		L 12–14	
October 28	Coast Guard*	Kingston, RI	W 20–12	
November 4	at Worcester Tech*		W 20–7	
November 11	Connecticut State^{†}	Kingston, RI (rivalry)	W 20–7	
*Non-conference game; ^{†}Homecoming
