= 1928 Rhode Island State Rams football team =

American college football season

1928 Rhode Island State Rams football
- Conference: New England Conference
- Record: 2–7 (0–3 New England)
- Head coach: Frank Keaney (9th season)

1928 New England Conference football standings
	Conf.					Overall
Team	W		L		T	W		L		T
Maine +	2	–	0	–	1	4	–	1	–	2
Connecticut +	1	–	0	–	2	4	–	1	–	3
New Hampshire	1	–	1	–	1	3	–	2	–	3
Rhode Island State	0	–	3	–	0	2	–	7	–	0
Massachusetts	0	–	0	–	0	2	–	5	–	1
+ – Conference co-champions

The 1928 Rhode Island Rams football team was an American football team that represented Rhode Island State College (later renamed the University of Rhode Island) as a member of the New England Conference during the 1928 college football season. In its ninth season under head coach Frank Keaney, the team compiled a 2–7 record (0–3 against conference opponents) and finished in last place in the conference.

== Schedule ==
Date	Opponent	Site	Result	Attendance	Source
September 22	Coast Guard Destroyer*	Meade Field; Kingston, RI	L 0–7		
September 29	at Maine	Alumni Field; Orono, ME	L 6–20		
October 6	Coast Guard*	Meade Field; Kingston, RI	W 6–0		
October 13	New Hampshire^{†}	Meade Field; Kingston, RI	L 0–12	5,000	
October 20	Newport Naval Training Station*	Meade Field; Kingston, RI	W 7–0		
October 27	at Lowell Textile*	Lowell, MA	L 0–21		
November 10	Worcester Tech*	Meade Field; Kingston, RI	L 0–13		
November 17	at Connecticut	Gardner Dow Athletic Fields; Storrs, CT (rivalry)	L 0–24		
November 24	at Brown*	Brown Stadium; Providence, RI (rivalry)	L 7–33		
*Non-conference game; ^{†}Homecoming
