= 1930 Rhode Island State Rams football team =

American college football season

1930 Rhode Island State Rams football
- Conference: New England Conference
- Record: 5–2–1 (0–1–1 New England)
- Head coach: Frank Keaney (11th season)

1930 New England Conference football standings
	Conf.					Overall
Team	W		L		T	W		L		T
New Hampshire $	2	–	0	–	0	5	–	2	–	1
Maine	2	–	1	–	0	3	–	4	–	0
Rhode Island State	0	–	1	–	1	5	–	2	–	1
Connecticut	0	–	2	–	1	1	–	5	–	1
$ – Conference champion; Dubious – Discuss

The 1930 Rhode Island Rams football team was an American football team that represented Rhode Island State College (later renamed the University of Rhode Island) as a member of the New England Conference during the 1930 college football season. In its 11th season under head coach Frank Keaney, the team compiled a 5–2–1 record (0–1–1 against conference opponents) and finished in third place in the conference.

== Schedule ==
Date	Opponent	Site	Result	Source
September 20	Arnold*	Kingston, RI	W 38–0	
September 27	at Brown*	Providence, RI (rivalry)	L 0–7	
October 4	at Maine	Orono, ME	L 12–13	
October 18	Bates*	Kingston, RI	W 14–0	
October 25	Coast Guard*	Kingston, RI	W 27–0	
November 1	Boston University*	Kingston, RI	W 14–0	
November 8	Worcester Tech*^{†}	Kingston, RI	W 45–0	
November 15	at Connecticut	Gardner Dow Athletic Fields; Storrs, CT (rivalry)	T 0–0	
*Non-conference game; ^{†}Homecoming
