= 1934 Maine Black Bears football team =

American college football season

1934 Maine Black Bears football

MIAA champion
- Conference: New England Conference, Maine Intercollegiate Athletic Association
- Record: 4–3 (0–2 New England, 3–0 MIAA)
- Head coach: Fred Brice (14th season)
- Home stadium: Alumni Field

1934 New England Conference football standings
	Conf.					Overall
Team	W		L		T	W		L		T
New Hampshire $	1	–	0	–	0	3	–	4	–	2
Rhode Island State	2	–	1	–	0	6	–	3	–	0
Connecticut State	0	–	1	–	0	1	–	7	–	0
Maine	0	–	2	–	0	4	–	3	–	0
$ – Conference champion

The 1934 Maine Black Bears football team was an American football team that represented the University of Maine as a member of the New England Conference and Maine Intercollegiate Athletic Association during the 1934 college football season. In its 14th season under head coach Fred Brice, the team compiled a 4–3 record (0–2 against New England and 3–0 against MIAA conference opponents). The team played its home games at Alumni Field in Orono, Maine. George Cobb was the team captain.

== Schedule ==
Date	Opponent	Site	Result	Source
September 29	Rhode Island State	Alumni Field; Orono, ME	L 0–6	
October 6	Lowell Textile*	Alumni Field; Orono, ME	W 46–0	
October 13	at Dartmouth*	Memorial Field; Hanover, NH	L 0–27	
October 20	at New Hampshire	Memorial Field; Durham, NH (rivalry)	L 7–24	
October 27	Bates	Alumni Field; Orono, ME	W 12–0	
November 3	Colby	Alumni Field; Orono, ME	W 20–6	
November 10	at Bowdoin	Whittier Field; Brunswick, ME	W 13–0	
*Non-conference game
