= 1938 Northeastern Huskies football team =

American college football season

1938 Northeastern Huskies football
- Conference: New England Conference
- Record: 3–3–1 (0–0 New England)
- Head coach: James W. Dunn (2nd season)
- Home stadium: Kent Street Field

1938 New England Conference football standings
| | Conf. | | | | | Overall |
| Team | W | | L | | T | W | | L | | T |
|---|---|---|---|---|---|---|---|---|---|---|
| Rhode Island State $ | 2 | – | 0 | – | 0 | 4 | – | 4 | – | 0 |
| Maine | 2 | – | 1 | – | 0 | 3 | – | 4 | – | 0 |
| New Hampshire | 1 | – | 1 | – | 0 | 3 | – | 6 | – | 0 |
| Northeastern | 0 | – | 0 | – | 0 | 3 | – | 3 | – | 1 |
| Connecticut State | 0 | – | 3 | – | 0 | 4 | – | 3 | – | 0 |
$ – Conference champion

The 1938 Northeastern Huskies football team represented Northeastern University as a member of the New England Conference (NEC) during the 1938 college football season. Led by second-year head coach James W. Dunn, the Lions compiled an overall record of 3–3–1, with a conference record of 0–0, and finished fourth in the NEC.

== Schedule ==
| Date | Opponent | Site | Result | Attendance | Source |
|---|---|---|---|---|---|
| September 30 | at Boston College* | Alumni Field; Chestnut Hill, MA | L 0–13 | 7,500 | |
| October 8 | Bates* | Kent Street Field; Brookline, MA | W 6–0 | 3,000 | |
| October 15 | Lowell Textile* | Kent Street Field; Brookline, MA | T 13–13 | 5,000 | |
| October 22 | at Saint Anselm* | Manchester, NH | L 6–40 | | |
| October 29 | at Springfield* | Pratt Field; Springfield, MA | L 7–14 | 2,000 | |
| November 4 | at American International* | Pynchon Field; Springfield, MA | W 28–12 | 3,800 | |
| November 11 | at Upsala* | Ashland Stadium; East Orange, NJ | W 13–7 | 3,500 | |
*Non-conference game
