= 1938 Rhode Island State Rams football team =

American college football season

1938 Rhode Island State Rams football

New England champion
- Conference: New England Conference
- Record: 4–4 (2–0 New England)
- Head coach: Frank Keaney (19th season)
- Home stadium: Meade Stadium

1938 New England Conference football standings
	Conf.					Overall
Team	W		L		T	W		L		T
Rhode Island State $	2	–	0	–	0	4	–	4	–	0
Maine	2	–	1	–	0	3	–	4	–	0
New Hampshire	1	–	1	–	0	3	–	6	–	0
Northeastern	0	–	0	–	0	3	–	3	–	1
Connecticut State	0	–	3	–	0	4	–	3	–	0
$ – Conference champion

The 1938 Rhode Island State Rams football team was an American football team that represented Rhode Island State College (later renamed the University of Rhode Island) as a member of the New England Conference during the 1938 college football season. In its 19th season under head coach Frank Keaney, the team compiled a 4–4 record (2–0 against conference opponents) and won the conference championship. The team played its home games at Meade Stadium.

== Schedule ==
Date	Opponent	Site	Result
September 24	at Maine	Alumni Field; Orono, ME	W 14–6
October 1	at Holy Cross*	Fitton Field; Worcester, MA	L 13–48
October 8	American International*	Meade Stadium; Kingston, RI	W 31–0
October 15	at Massachusetts State	Alumni Field; Amherst, MA	W 20–0
October 22	at Brown*	Brown Stadium; Providence, RI (rivalry)	L 21–40
October 29	Worcester Tech^{†}*	Meade Stadium; Kingston, RI	L 14–19
November 5	at Connecticut State	Gardner Dow Athletic Fields; Storrs, CT (rivalry)	W 21–20
November 11	vs. Providence*	Cranston Stadium; Cranston, RI	L 7–19
*Non-conference game; ^{†}Homecoming
