= 1928 Maine Black Bears football team =

American college football season

1928 Maine Black Bears football

New England champion MIAA champion
- Conference: New England Conference, Maine Intercollegiate Athletic Association
- Record: 4–1–2 (2–0–1 New England, 2–0–1 MIAA)
- Head coach: Fred Brice (8th season)
- Home stadium: Alumni Field

1928 New England Conference football standings
	Conf.					Overall
Team	W		L		T	W		L		T
Maine +	2	–	0	–	1	4	–	1	–	2
Connecticut +	1	–	0	–	2	4	–	1	–	3
New Hampshire	1	–	1	–	1	3	–	2	–	3
Rhode Island State	0	–	3	–	0	2	–	7	–	0
Massachusetts	0	–	0	–	0	2	–	5	–	1
+ – Conference co-champions

The 1928 Maine Black Bears football team was an American football team that represented the University of Maine as a member of the New England Conference and Maine Intercollegiate Athletic Association during the 1928 college football season. In its eighth season under head coach Fred Brice, the team compiled a 4–1–2 record (2–0–1 against New England and 2–0–1 against MIAA conference opponents) and won both conference championships. The team played its home games at Alumni Field in Orono, Maine. James Buzzell was the team captain.

== Schedule ==
Date	Opponent	Site	Result	Attendance	Source
September 29	at Rhode Island State	Alumni Field; Orono, ME	W 7–0		
October 6	at Yale*	Yale Bowl; New Haven, CT	L 0–27		
October 13	Connecticut	Alumni Field; Orono, ME	T 0–0		
October 20	at New Hampshire	Memorial Field; Durham, NH (rivalry)	W 7–0	7,000	
October 27	Bates	Alumni Field; Orono, ME	W 46–0		
November 3	Colby	Alumni Field; Orono, ME	T 0–0		
November 10	at Bowdoin	Whittier Field; Brunswick, ME	W 26–0		
*Non-conference game
