= 1924 Connecticut Aggies football team =

American college football season

1924 Connecticut Aggies football

New England Conference champion
- Conference: New England Conference
- Record: 6–0–2 (4–0 New England)
- Head coach: Sumner Dole (2nd season)
- Home stadium: Gardner Dow Athletic Fields

1924 New England Conference football standings
	Conf.					Overall
Team	W		L		T	W		L		T
Connecticut $	4	–	0	–	0	6	–	0	–	2
New Hampshire	2	–	1	–	0	7	–	2	–	0
Maine	1	–	2	–	0	4	–	3	–	1
Massachusetts	0	–	1	–	0	6	–	1	–	1
Rhode Island State	0	–	3	–	0	0	–	7	–	0
$ – Conference champion

The 1924 Connecticut Aggies football team represented Connecticut Agricultural College, now the University of Connecticut, in the 1924 college football season. The Aggies were led by second-year head coach Sumner Dole, and completed the season with a record of 6–0–2. The Aggies were members of the New England Conference and went 4–0 in conference games, claiming their first conference championship. The New York Times said the team was one of the best in the nation, and the defense was the top in the nation, giving up only 13 points all season. The Aggies defeated rival Massachusetts for the first time.

== Schedule ==
Date	Opponent	Site	Result	Attendance	Source
September 27	at Massachusetts	Alumni Field; Amherst, MA (rivalry)	W 12–10		
October 4	at Tufts*	Medford, MA	T 0–0		
October 11	at Maine	Orono, ME	W 3–0		
October 18	New Hampshire	Gardner Dow Athletic Fields; Storrs, CT	W 6–3		
October 25	Norwich*	Gardner Dow Athletic Fields; Storrs, CT	W 21–0		
November 1	at Springfield*	Pratt Field; Springfield, MA	T 0–0	4,000	
November 8	at Trinity (CT)*	Trinity Field; Hartford, CT	W 26–0		
November 15	Rhode Island State	Gardner Dow Athletic Fields; Storrs, CT (rivalry)	W 22–0		
*Non-conference game
