= 1930 Connecticut Aggies football team =

American college football season

1930 Connecticut Aggies football
- Conference: New England Conference
- Record: 1–5–1 (0–2–1 New England)
- Head coach: Sumner Dole (8th season)
- Home stadium: Gardner Dow Athletic Fields

1930 New England Conference football standings
	Conf.					Overall
Team	W		L		T	W		L		T
New Hampshire $	2	–	0	–	0	5	–	2	–	1
Maine	2	–	1	–	0	3	–	4	–	0
Rhode Island State	0	–	1	–	1	5	–	2	–	1
Connecticut	0	–	2	–	1	1	–	5	–	1
$ – Conference champion; Dubious – Discuss

The 1930 Connecticut Aggies football team represented Connecticut Agricultural College, now the University of Connecticut, in the 1930 college football season. The Aggies were led by eighth-year head coach Sumner Dole, and completed the season with a record of 1–5–1.

== Schedule ==
Date	Opponent	Site	Result	Source
September 27	Albright*	Reading, PA	L 0–19	
October 11	at Maine	Alumni Field; Orono, ME	L 0–13	
October 18	Trinity (CT)*	Gardner Dow Athletic Fields; Storrs, CT	L 6–12	
October 25	Tufts*	Gardner Dow Athletic Fields; Storrs, CT	L 0–25	
November 1	at Coast Guard*	New London, CT	W 13–0	
November 8	at New Hampshire	Memorial Field; Durham, NH	L 0–33	
November 15	Rhode Island State	Gardner Dow Athletic Fields; Storrs, CT (rivalry)	T 0–0	
*Non-conference game
