= 1934 Connecticut State Huskies football team =

American college football season

1934 Connecticut State Huskies football
- Conference: New England Conference
- Record: 1–7 (0–1 New England)
- Head coach: J. Orlean Christian (1st season)
- Home stadium: Gardner Dow Athletic Fields

1934 New England Conference football standings
	Conf.					Overall
Team	W		L		T	W		L		T
New Hampshire $	1	–	0	–	0	3	–	4	–	2
Rhode Island State	2	–	1	–	0	6	–	3	–	0
Connecticut State	0	–	1	–	0	1	–	7	–	0
Maine	0	–	2	–	0	4	–	3	–	0
$ – Conference champion

The 1934 Connecticut State Huskies football team represented Connecticut State College, now the University of Connecticut, in the 1934 college football season. The Huskies were led by first-year head coach J. Orlean Christian and completed the season with a record of 1–6–1.

== Schedule ==
Date	Opponent	Site	Result	Source
September 22	American International*	Gardner Dow Athletic Fields; Storrs, CT	L 0–7	
September 29	at Amherst*	Pratt Field; Amherst, MA	L 0–22	
October 6	Wesleyan*	Gardner Dow Athletic Fields; Storrs, CT	L 0–14	
October 13	Massachusetts State*	Gardner Dow Athletic Fields; Storrs, CT (rivalry)	L 6–7	
October 20	at Tufts*	Medford, MA	L 0–14	
October 27	at Trinity (CT)*	Trinity Field; Hartford, CT	L 0–25	
November 3	at Coast Guard*	Jones Field; New London, CT	W 13–0	
November 10	Rhode Island State	Gardner Dow Athletic Fields; Storrs, CT (rivalry)	L 0–19	
*Non-conference game
