= 1936 Connecticut State Huskies football team =

American college football season

1936 Connecticut State Huskies football

New England Conference champion
- Conference: New England Conference
- Record: 7–2 (2–0 New England)
- Head coach: J. Orlean Christian (3rd season)
- Home stadium: Gardner Dow Athletic Fields

1936 New England Conference football standings
	Conf.					Overall
Team	W		L		T	W		L		T
Connecticut State $	2	–	0	–	0	7	–	2	–	0
Maine	1	–	1	–	0	4	–	3	–	0
Rhode Island State	1	–	2	–	0	5	–	4	–	0
New Hampshire	0	–	1	–	0	3	–	3	–	2
$ – Conference champion

The 1936 Connecticut State Huskies football team represented Connecticut State College, now the University of Connecticut, in the 1936 college football season. The Huskies were led by third-year head coach J. Orlean Christian and completed the season with a record of 7–2.

== Schedule ==
Date	Opponent	Site	Result
October 26	at Brown*	Brown Stadium; Providence, RI	W 27–0
October 3	Wesleyan*	Gardner Dow Athletic Fields; Storrs, CT	L 0–3
October 10	Massachusetts State*	Gardner Dow Athletic Fields; Storrs, CT (rivalry)	W 13–0
October 17	Worcester Tech*	Gardner Dow Athletic Fields; Storrs, CT	W 19–6
October 24	at Trinity (CT)*	Trinity Field; Hartford, CT	L 0–8
October 30	at Coast Guard*	Cadet Memorial Field; New London, CT	W 45–12
November 7	Rhode Island State	Gardner Dow Athletic Fields; Storrs, CT (rivalry)	W 33–0
November 14	at Northeastern	Kent Street Field; Brookline, MA	W 14–13
November 21	Norwich*	Gardner Dow Athletic Fields; Storrs, CT	W 52–6
*Non-conference game
