= 1928 Connecticut Aggies football team =

American college football season

1928 Connecticut Aggies football

New England Conference co-champion
- Conference: New England Conference
- Record: 4–1–3 (1–0–2 New England)
- Head coach: Sumner Dole (6th season)
- Home stadium: Gardner Dow Athletic Fields

1928 New England Conference football standings
	Conf.					Overall
Team	W		L		T	W		L		T
Maine +	2	–	0	–	1	4	–	1	–	2
Connecticut +	1	–	0	–	2	4	–	1	–	3
New Hampshire	1	–	1	–	1	3	–	2	–	3
Rhode Island State	0	–	3	–	0	2	–	7	–	0
Massachusetts	0	–	0	–	0	2	–	5	–	1
+ – Conference co-champions

The 1928 Connecticut Aggies football team represented Connecticut Agricultural College—now known as the University of Connecticut—in the 1928 college football season. The Aggies were led by sixth-year head coach Sumner Dole and completed the season with a record of 4–1–3.

== Schedule ==
Date	Opponent	Site	Result	Attendance	Source
October 6	Wesleyan*	Gardner Dow Athletic Fields; Storrs, CT	W 33–0		
October 13	at Maine	Alumni Field; Orono, ME	T 0–0		
October 20	at Lowell Textile*	Lowell, MA	T 0–0		
October 27	at Vermont*	Centennial Field; Burlington, VT	W 6–0		
November 3	Coast Guard*	Gardner Dow Athletic Fields; Storrs, CT	W 20–0		
November 10	at New Hampshire	Memorial Field; Durham, NH	T 0–0		
November 17	Rhode Island State	Gardner Dow Athletic Fields; Storrs, CT (rivalry)	W 24–0		
November 19	at Boston College*	Fenway Park; Boston, MA	L 13–51	12,000	
*Non-conference game
