= 1926 New Hampshire Wildcats football team =

American college football season

1926 New Hampshire Wildcats football
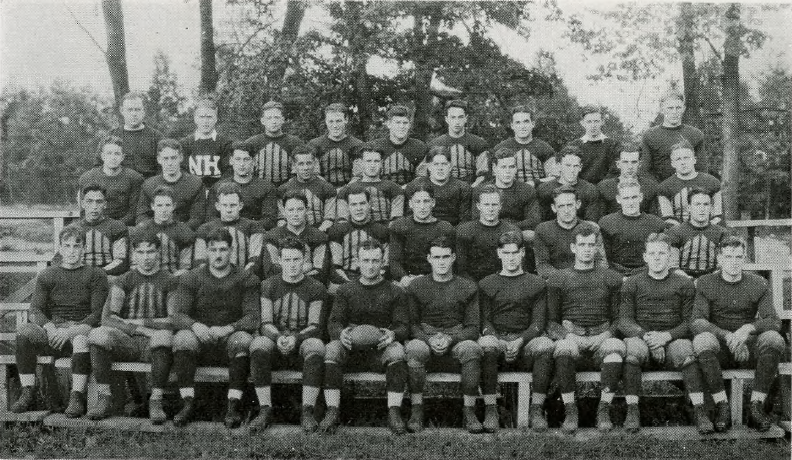
- Conference: New England Conference
- Record: 4–4 (2–1 New England)
- Head coach: Butch Cowell (11th season)
- Captain: John Callahan
- Home stadium: Memorial Field

1926 New England Conference football standings
	Conf.					Overall
Team	W		L		T	W		L		T
Connecticut $	3	–	1	–	0	7	–	1	–	0
Maine	2	–	1	–	0	7	–	1	–	0
New Hampshire	2	–	1	–	0	4	–	4	–	0
Massachusetts	0	–	1	–	0	1	–	6	–	0
Rhode Island State	0	–	3	–	0	1	–	6	–	0
$ – Conference champion

The 1926 New Hampshire Wildcats football team was an American football team that represented the University of New Hampshire as a member of the New England Conference during the 1926 college football season. In its 11th season under head coach William "Butch" Cowell, (Note: This was Cowell's 12th year and 11th season as head coach, as the school did not field a team in 1918 due to World War I.) the team compiled a 4–4 record, and were outscored by their opponents, 90–81. The team played its home games in Durham, New Hampshire, at Memorial Field. (Note: Memorial Field remains in use by the New Hampshire women's field hockey team.) This was the first season with Wildcats as the official nickname of the school's sports teams, having been adopted in February 1926.

== Schedule ==
Date	Opponent	Site	Result	Attendance	Source
September 25	Quantico Marines*	Memorial Field; Durham, NH	‡		
October 2	at Bowdoin*	Whittier Field; Brunswick, ME	L 0–7		
October 9	Colby*	Memorial Field; Durham, NH	W 6–0		
October 16	at Rhode Island State	Kingston, RI	W 7–6		
October 23	at Springfield*	Pratt Field; Springfield, MA	L 14–24		
October 30	vs. Connecticut	Textile Field; Manchester, NH	L 0–3		
November 6	at Tufts*	Tufts Oval; Medford, MA	W 28–3		
November 13	Maine^{†}	Memorial Field; Durham, NH (rivalry)	W 14–7		
November 20	at Brown*	Brown Stadium; Providence, RI	L 12–40		
*Non-conference game; ^{†}Homecoming; Source:

‡ New Hampshire and the Quantico Marines practiced together in Durham for two weeks in September, including a scrimmage on September 18. The game played on September 25 was won by the Marines, 24–0. The game is not listed by the Wildcats' media guide or College Football Data Warehouse, possibly because players for the Marines were members of the active military rather than college students.
