= 1926 Connecticut Aggies football team =

American college football season

1926 Connecticut Aggies football

New England Conference champion
- Conference: New England Conference
- Record: 7–1 (3–1 New England)
- Head coach: Sumner Dole (4th season)
- Home stadium: Gardner Dow Athletic Fields

1926 New England Conference football standings
	Conf.					Overall
Team	W		L		T	W		L		T
Connecticut $	3	–	1	–	0	7	–	1	–	0
Maine	2	–	1	–	0	7	–	1	–	0
New Hampshire	2	–	1	–	0	4	–	4	–	0
Massachusetts	0	–	1	–	0	1	–	6	–	0
Rhode Island State	0	–	3	–	0	1	–	6	–	0
$ – Conference champion

The 1926 Connecticut Aggies football team represented Connecticut Agricultural College, now the University of Connecticut, in the 1926 college football season as a member of the New England Conference. The Aggies were led by fourth-year head coach Sumner Dole, and completed the season with a record of 7–1, going 3–1 against conference opponents.

== Schedule ==
Date	Opponent	Site	Result	Source
October 2	at Wesleyan*	Andrus Field; Middletown, CT	W 13–0	
October 9	at Massachusetts	Alumni Field; Amherst, MA (rivalry)	W 13–6	
October 16	at Maine	Orono, ME	L 0–21	
October 23	Trinity (CT)*	Gardner Dow Athletic Fields; Storrs, CT	W 23–0	
October 30	vs. New Hampshire	Textile Field; Manchester, NH	W 3–0	
November 6	Cooper Union*	Gardner Dow Athletic Fields; Storrs, CT	W 68–0	
November 13	Rhode Island State	Gardner Dow Athletic Fields; Storrs, CT (rivalry)	W 33–0	
November 20	Rensselaer*	Gardner Dow Athletic Fields; Storrs, CT	W 26–6	
*Non-conference game
