= 1923 Connecticut Aggies football team =

American college football season

1923 Connecticut Aggies football
- Conference: New England Conference
- Record: 3–4–1 (1–1–1 New England)
- Head coach: Sumner Dole (1st season)
- Home stadium: Gardner Dow Athletic Fields

1923 New England Conference football standings
| | Conf. | | | | | Overall |
| Team | W | | L | | T | W | | L | | T |
|---|---|---|---|---|---|---|---|---|---|---|
| Maine $ | 3 | – | 0 | – | 0 | 5 | – | 3 | – | 0 |
| New Hampshire | 1 | – | 1 | – | 1 | 4 | – | 4 | – | 1 |
| Connecticut | 1 | – | 1 | – | 1 | 3 | – | 4 | – | 1 |
| Rhode Island State | 0 | – | 3 | – | 0 | 1 | – | 5 | – | 1 |
| Massachusetts | 0 | – | 0 | – | 0 | 2 | – | 5 | – | 0 |
$ – Conference champion

The 1923 Connecticut Aggies football team represented Connecticut Agricultural College, now the University of Connecticut, in the 1923 college football season. The Aggies were led by first-year head coach Sumner Dole, and completed the season with a record of 3–4–1. The Aggies completed their first year in the newly established New England Conference.

== Schedule ==
| Date | Opponent | Site | Result | Source |
|---|---|---|---|---|
| September 29 | at Trinity (CT)* | Trinity Field; Hartford, CT | W 13–0 | |
| October 6 | at Tufts* | Medford, MA | L 0–14 | |
| October 13 | Maine | Gardner Dow Athletic Fields; Storrs, CT | L 0–7 | |
| October 20 | at New Hampshire | Memorial Field; Durham, NH | T 0–0 | |
| October 27 | at Norwich* | Norwich, VT | L 0–13 | |
| November 3 | CCNY* | Gardner Dow Athletic Fields; Storrs, CT | W 19–0 | |
| November 10 | St. Stephen's (NY)* | Gardner Dow Athletic Fields; Storrs, CT | L 6–12 | |
| November 17 | at Rhode Island State | Kingston, RI (rivalry) | W 7–0 | |
*Non-conference game
