= 1933 Connecticut State Aggies football team =

American college football season

1933 Connecticut State Aggies football
- Conference: New England Conference
- Record: 1–6–1 (0–1 New England)
- Head coach: Sumner Dole (11th season)
- Home stadium: Gardner Dow Athletic Fields

1933 New England Conference football standings
	Conf.					Overall
Team	W		L		T	W		L		T
Rhode Island State $	2	–	0	–	0	6	–	2	–	0
New Hampshire	1	–	0	–	0	3	–	3	–	1
Connecticut State	0	–	1	–	0	1	–	6	–	1
Maine	0	–	2	–	0	4	–	3	–	0
$ – Conference champion

The 1933 Connecticut State Aggies football team represented Connecticut State College, now the University of Connecticut, in the 1933 college football season. The Aggies were led by 11th-year head coach Sumner Dole, and completed the season with a record of 1–6–1.

== Schedule ==
Date	Opponent	Site	Result	Source
September 23	Cooper Union*	Gardner Dow Athletic Fields; Storrs, CT	W 19–6	
September 30	at Vermont*	Centennial Field; Burlington, VT	L 6–36	
October 7	at Wesleyan*	Andrus Field; Middletown, CT	L 0–19	
October 14	at Massachusetts State*	Alumni Field; Amherst, MA (rivalry)	L 7–40	
October 21	at Tufts*	Medford, MA	L 0–42	
October 28	Trinity (CT)*	Gardner Dow Athletic Fields; Storrs, CT	L 0–13	
November 4	Coast Guard*	Gardner Dow Athletic Fields; Storrs, CT	T 0–0	
November 11	at Rhode Island State	Meade Field; Kingston, RI (rivalry)	L 20–7	
*Non-conference game
