= 1934 Rhode Island State Rams football team =

American college football season

1934 Rhode Island State Rams football
- Conference: New England Conference
- Record: 6–3 (2–1 New England)
- Head coach: Frank Keaney (15th season)

1934 New England Conference football standings
	Conf.					Overall
Team	W		L		T	W		L		T
New Hampshire $	1	–	0	–	0	3	–	4	–	2
Rhode Island State	2	–	1	–	0	6	–	3	–	0
Connecticut State	0	–	1	–	0	1	–	7	–	0
Maine	0	–	2	–	0	4	–	3	–	0
$ – Conference champion

The 1934 Rhode Island Rams football team was an American football team that represented Rhode Island State College (later renamed the University of Rhode Island) as a member of the New England Conference during the 1934 college football season. In its 15th season under head coach Frank Keaney, the team compiled a 6–3 record (2–1 against conference opponents) and finished in second place in the conference.

== Schedule ==
Date	Opponent	Site	Result	Attendance
September 22	Brooklyn*	Kingston, RI	W 31–0	
September 29	at Maine	Alumni Field; Orono, ME	W 6–0	
October 6	at Brown*	Providence, RI (rivalry)	L 0–13	
October 13	Northeastern*	Kingston, RI	L 0–6	
October 20	at Massachusetts State*	Alumni Field; Amherst, MA	W 7–0	
October 27	at Coast Guard*	New London, CT	W 19–0	
November 3	Worcester Tech^{†}*	Kingston, RI	W 44–0	
November 10	at Connecticut State	Gardner Dow Athletic Fields; Storrs, CT (rivalry)	W 19–0	
November 24	at Providence*	Brown Field; Providence, RI	L 7–21	
*Non-conference game; ^{†}Homecoming
