= 1928 Massachusetts Aggies football team =

American college football season

1928 Massachusetts Aggies football
- Conference: New England Conference
- Record: 2–5–1 (0–0 New England)
- Head coach: Charles McGeoch (1st season)
- Home stadium: Alumni Field

1928 New England Conference football standings
	Conf.					Overall
Team	W		L		T	W		L		T
Maine +	2	–	0	–	1	4	–	1	–	2
Connecticut +	1	–	0	–	2	4	–	1	–	3
New Hampshire	1	–	1	–	1	3	–	2	–	3
Rhode Island State	0	–	3	–	0	2	–	7	–	0
Massachusetts	0	–	0	–	0	2	–	5	–	1
+ – Conference co-champions

The 1928 Massachusetts Aggies football team represented Massachusetts Agricultural College in the 1928 college football season. The Aggies were members of the New England Conference, but did not face any conference opponents this season. The team was coached by Charles McGeoch and played its home games at Alumni Field in Amherst, Massachusetts. The 1928 season was McGeoch's first with the Aggies. Massachusetts finished the season with a record of 2–5–1.

== Schedule ==
Date	Opponent	Site	Result
September 29	at Bowdoin*	Whittier Field; Brunswick, ME	L 0–13
October 6	Bates*	Alumni Field; Amherst, MA	W 6–0
October 13	Middlebury*	Alumni Field; Amherst, MA	W 7–0
October 20	at Norwich*	Sabine Field; Northfield, VT	L 6–18
October 27	Worcester Tech*	Alumni Field; Amherst, MA	T 0–0
November 3	Amherst*	Alumni Field; Amherst, MA	L 0–13
November 10	at Springfield*	Pratt Field; Springfield, MA	L 0–14
November 27	at Tufts*	Tufts Oval; Somerville, MA	L 6–32
*Non-conference game
