= New Hampshire Wildcats football =

Intercollegiate American football team

2026 New Hampshire Wildcats football team
- First season: 1893; 133 years ago
- Athletic director: Allison Rich
- General manager: Justin Trevisani
- Head coach: Sean Goldrich; 1st season, 0–0 (–)
- Location: Durham, New Hampshire
- Stadium: Wildcat Stadium (capacity: 11,015)
- NCAA division: Division I FCS
- Conference: CAA Football
- Colors: Blue, gray, and white
- All-time record: 618–507–54 (.547)

Conference championships
- 15
- Consensus All-Americans: 36
- Rivalries: Maine (rivalry); UMass (rivalry); Dartmouth (rivalry)
- Mascot: Wild E. Cat
- Website: unhwildcats.com/football

The New Hampshire Wildcats football program is the intercollegiate American football team for the University of New Hampshire. The Wildcats compete in the NCAA Division I Football Championship Subdivision (FCS) and are members of the Coastal Athletic Association (CAA). The team plays its home games at the 11,000 seat Wildcat Stadium in Durham, New Hampshire, and are led by incoming head coach Sean Goldrich.

The school has fielded a varsity football team annually since 1893, with the exception of one year during World War I and two years during World War II. Bill Bowes, who served as head coach from 1972 to 1998, is an inductee of the College Football Hall of Fame.

== Conference affiliations ==
- 1893–1922: Independent
- 1923–1946: New England Conference
- 1947–1996: Yankee Conference
- 1997–2006: Atlantic 10 Conference
- 2007–present: Coastal Athletic Association

== Home venues ==
The Wildcats have played their home football games at several venues in Durham. Prior to the current stadium, which has been in use since 1936, the team played its home games on Memorial Field from 1921 through 1935. Memorial Field remains in use by the women's field hockey team. Memorial Field was constructed to "honor the memory of those New Hampshire men who gave their lives for their country during the great World War." Funded by donations from alumni, it was built on the site of the prior athletic field, which had been referred to as the College Oval.

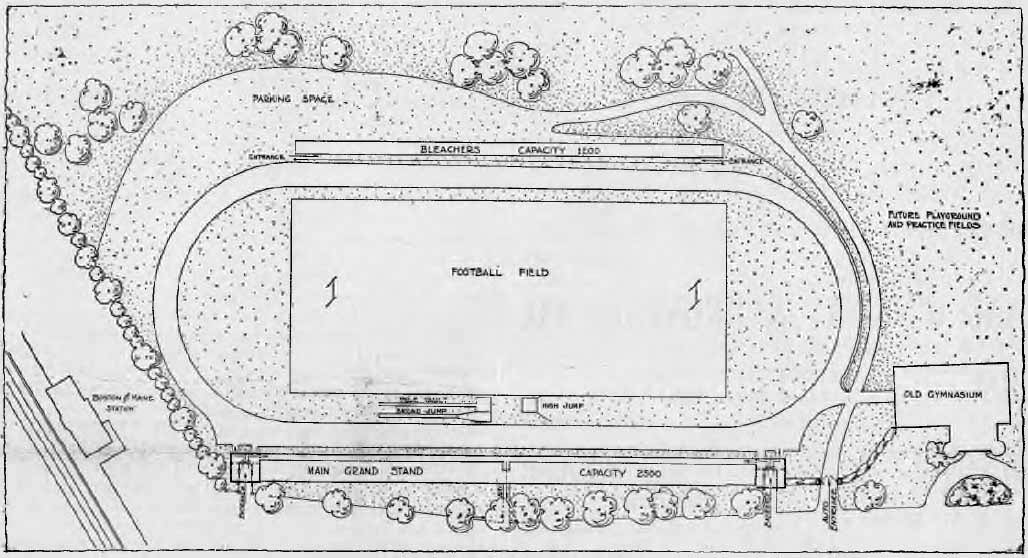
Plan for Memorial Field as published in the May 12, 1920, edition of The New Hampshire. 43.139041°N 70.934808°W

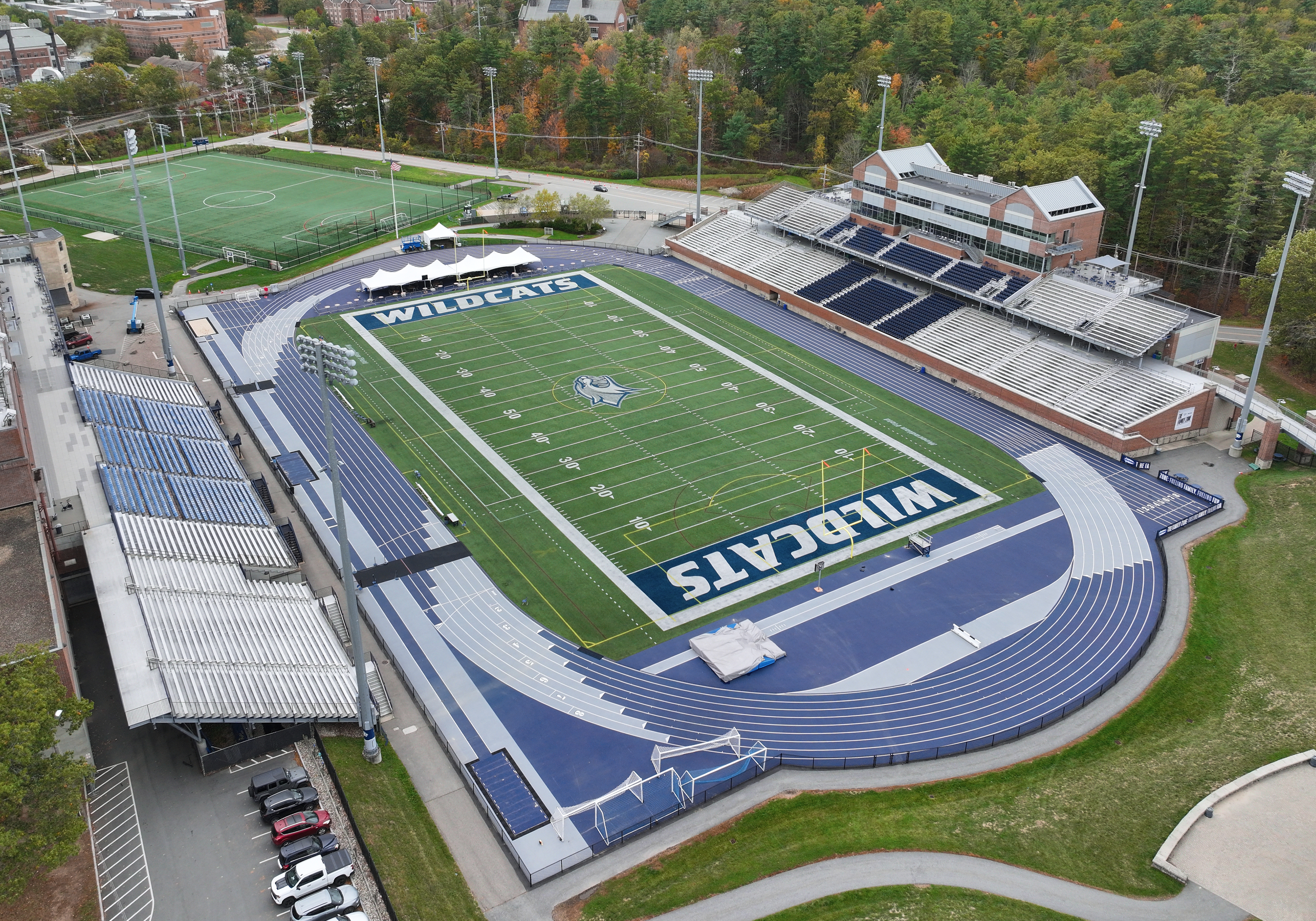
Wildcat Stadium, opened in 1936, is the current venue

- unknown–1920: College Oval
  - Last game: November 6, 1920, vs. Colby
- 1921–1935: Memorial Field
  - First game: November 12, 1921, vs. Massachusetts Agricultural College
  - Last game: November 9, 1935, vs. Tufts
- 1936–present: Wildcat Stadium
  - Originally known as Lewis Stadium / Lewis Field
    - First game: September 26, 1936, vs. Lowell Textile Institute
    - Dedicated: October 10, 1936, vs. Maine
  - Named Cowell Stadium from 1952 through 2015
  - Renamed Wildcat Stadium in 2016

== Notable former players ==
Notable team captains during the program's early years include:

- E. Dewey Graham (captain 1919), went on to become head coach at Norwich University.
- Red Howard (freshman captain 1919), played varsity at Princeton and two seasons in the NFL in the mid-1920s.
- Dutch Connor (captain 1921), played two seasons in the NFL in the mid-1920s, and succeeded Graham as head coach at Norwich.
- Cy Wentworth (captain 1923 & 1924), played three seasons in the NFL in the late 1920s.

Notable alumni who played in the NFL, AFL or CFL include:

- WR Kamau Peterson (1997–2000)
- TB Jerry Azumah (1995–1998)
- WR David Ball (2003–2006)
- OL Jason Ball (1997–2001)
- DB Etienne Boulay (2002–2005)
- DL Joe Fleming (1991–1994)
- WR David Gamble (1990–1993)
- LB Dwayne Gordon (1989–1992)
- DB Corey Graham (2003–2007)
- WR R.J. Harris (2011–2014)
- LB Bruce Huther (1973–1976)
- RB Chad Kackert (2005–2009)
- OL Greg Krause (1994–1998)
- FB Dan Kreider (1995–1999)
- LB Dave Rozumek (1972–1975)
- LB Dwayne Sabb (1988–1991)
- QB Ricky Santos (2003–2007)
- TE Scott Sicko (2006–2009)
- DT Jared Smith (2009–2012)
- WR Randal Williams (1996–2000)
- RB Dylan Laube (2024–Present)

Alumni who are notable for other achievements, outside of playing professional football, include:

- QB John J. Ryan (1906), college sports head coach, including Wisconsin football and Marquette basketball
- RB Lou D'Allesandro (1958–1960), New Hampshire State Senator
- QB Ryan Day (1998–2001), Ohio State head coach
- DB Chip Kelly (1981–1984), NCAA and NFL coach
- LB Rod Langway (1975–1976), NHL player who played both football and ice hockey for UNH
- DB Sean McDonnell (1975–1978), Wildcats football head coach 1999–2018 and 2020–2021

== Head coaches ==
Head Coaches

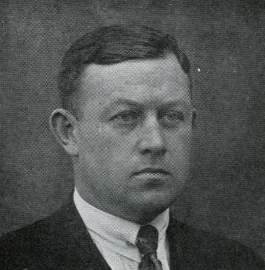
Butch Cowell

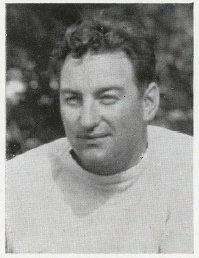
Charles M. Justice

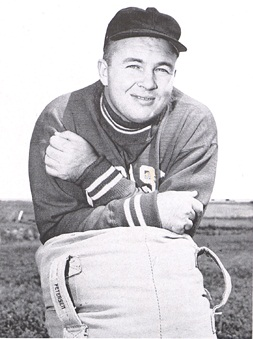
Bill Glassford

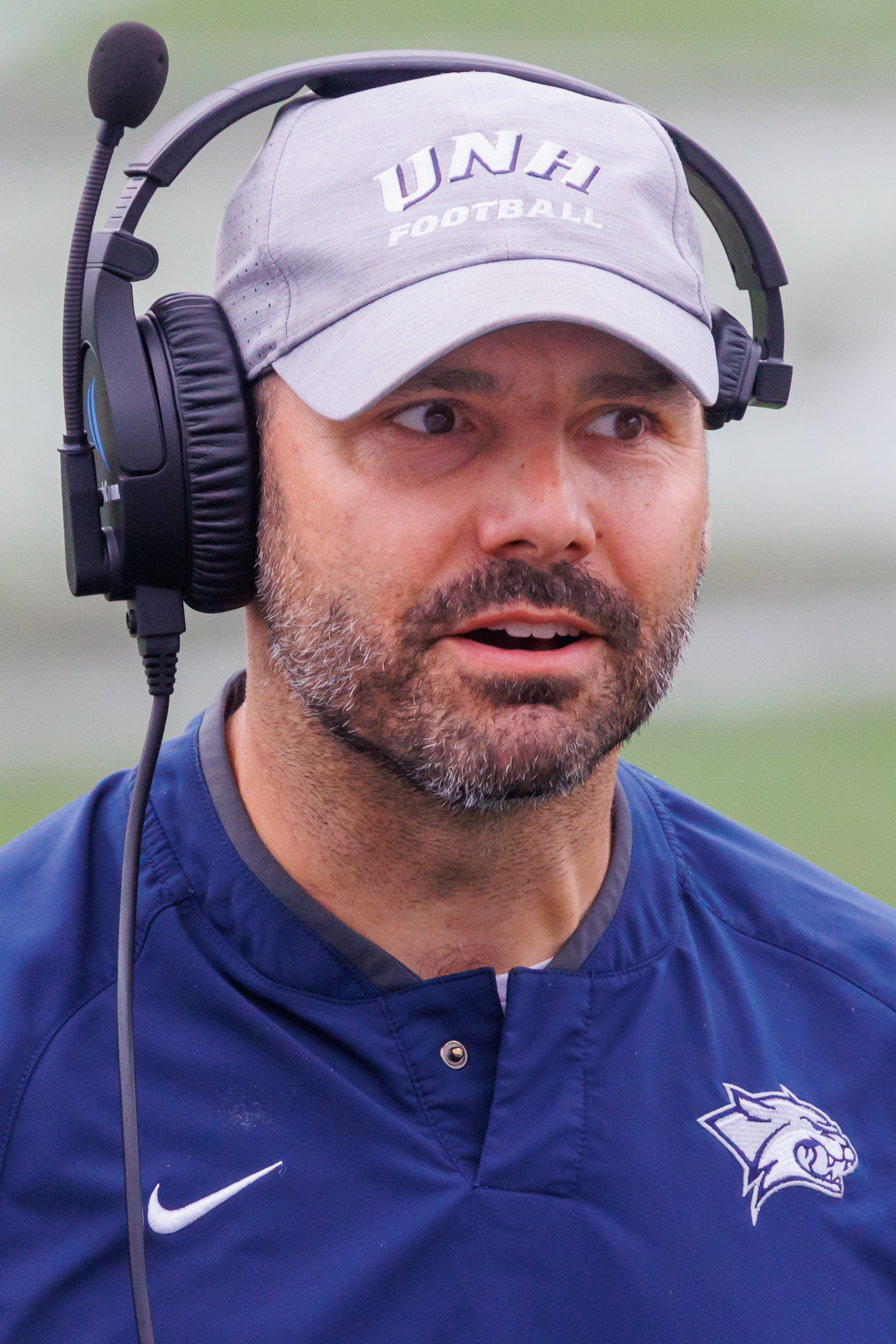
Ricky Santos

The below table lists the win–loss record for head coaches throughout program history. The team had its first formal head coach, John Scannell, during the 1902 season. Some opponents in early years were high school teams; for example, the 1895 team did not face any college teams in its six-game schedule. Other opponents into the 1920s were military teams (different from service academy programs, such as Army); an example being the 1926 team facing the Quantico Marines.

The school was not a member of any conference prior to the 1923 season. Since 1973, the team has played in NCAA classifications with postseason tournaments (playoffs).

Updated through the 2025 season.

Name	Term	Gm	Overall				Conference				Playoff		CCs	NCs
Name	Term	Gm	W	L	T	%	W	L	T	%	W	L	CCs	NCs
No coaches	1893–1901	50	16	32	2	.340								0
John Scannell	1902–1903	15	4	9	2	.333								0
G. B. Ward	1904	7	2	5	0	.286								0
unknown (Note: New Hampshire's media guide lists Edward Herr as head coach for the 1905 season, in addition to the 1906 and 1907 seasons. However, this is not corroborated by contemporary sources, as Herr was a student at Dartmouth through the 1905–06 academic year, and upon his hiring at Vermont for the 1908 season it was noted that he had been coach at New Hampshire for the prior two years.)	1905	8	2	4	2	.375								0
Edward Herr	1906–1907	16	3	10	3	.281								0
Charles Gill	1908	8	1	7	0	.125								0
Willard Gildersleeve	1909	7	3	4	0	.429								0
Ray B. Thomas	1910, 1911^{2 games} (Note: New Hampshire's media guide lists Ray B. Thomas as the only coach for the 1911 season, but The New Hampshire reported he was the third of three different coaches that season, hired to coach the team for their final two games.)	8	2	5	1	.313								0
George McCaa	1911^{3 games}	3	0	2	1	.167								0
unknown (Note: Newspaper reports mention Joseph Courtney being coach between McCaa and Thomas during the 1911 season, but this is in conflict with Courtney coaching the 1911 Boston College football team for the entire season.)	1911^{2 games}	2	1	1	0	.500								0
Tod Eberle	1912–1913	14	5	8	1	.393								0
Thomas D. Shepherd	1914	9	1	6	2	.222								0
Butch Cowell	1915–1917, 1919–1936	178	87	68	23	.553	17	9	4	.633			2	0
George Sauer	1937–1941	41	22	18	1	.549	5	2	1	.688			0	0
Charles M. Justice	1942	6	6	0	0	1.000	3	0	0	1.000			0	0
Herbert Snow	1944†	4	1	3	0	.250	1	1	0	.500			0	0
Bill Glassford	1946–1948	25	19	5	1	.780	10	1	1	.875			2	0
Chief Boston	1949–1964	127	60	57	10	.512	25	34	8	.433			4	0
Andy Mooradian	1965	8	0	8	0	.000	0	5	0	.000			0	0
Joe Yukica	1966–1967	16	7	9	0	.438	3	7	0	.300			0	0
Jim Root	1968–1971	33	18	14	1	.561	11	9	0	.550			1	0
Bill Bowes	1972–1998	286	175	106	5	.621	97	74	2	.566	1	4	4	0
Sean McDonnell	1999–2018, 2020–2021	261	157	104	0	.602	100	72	0	.581	14	14	2	0
Ricky Santos	2019‡, 2022–2025	61	37	24	0	.607	28	12	0	.700	1	3	1	0
Sean Goldrich	2026–present	0	0	0	0	–	0	0	0	–	0	0	0	0

† The 1944 schedule was limited to four games, with players restricted to 17-year-olds and returning veterans.
‡ McDonnell began a medical leave at the start of the 2019 season, with Santos named interim head coach; McDonnell returned the following season.

== Postseason appearances ==
=== Bowl games ===
The team has appeared in one bowl game during its history:

Year	Bowl	Opponent	Result	PF	PA
December 6, 1947	Glass Bowl	Toledo	L	14	20

Notes:

- While listed in NCAA records, the Glass Bowl is not considered an NCAA-sanctioned bowl game.
- The Wildcats also played in one Division II playoff game that was known, for historical reasons, by a bowl name. As that game was part of a tournament bracket, it is not listed in this section (see below).

=== Division II playoffs ===
The team made the postseason twice during the time it competed in Division II (1973–1977), compiling an overall record of 1–2:

- In the 1975 NCAA Division II postseason, the Wildcats defeated Lehigh in the first round, 35–21. The Wildcats then played Western Kentucky in the 1975 Grantland Rice Bowl semifinal game, losing 14–3.
- In the 1976 NCAA Division II postseason, the Wildcats lost to Montana State in the first round, 17–16; Montana State went on to win the Division II championship.

=== Division I-AA/FCS playoffs ===
The Wildcats have appeared in the Division I-AA/FCS Playoffs 19 times, playing 34 postseason games. Their overall record is 15–19.

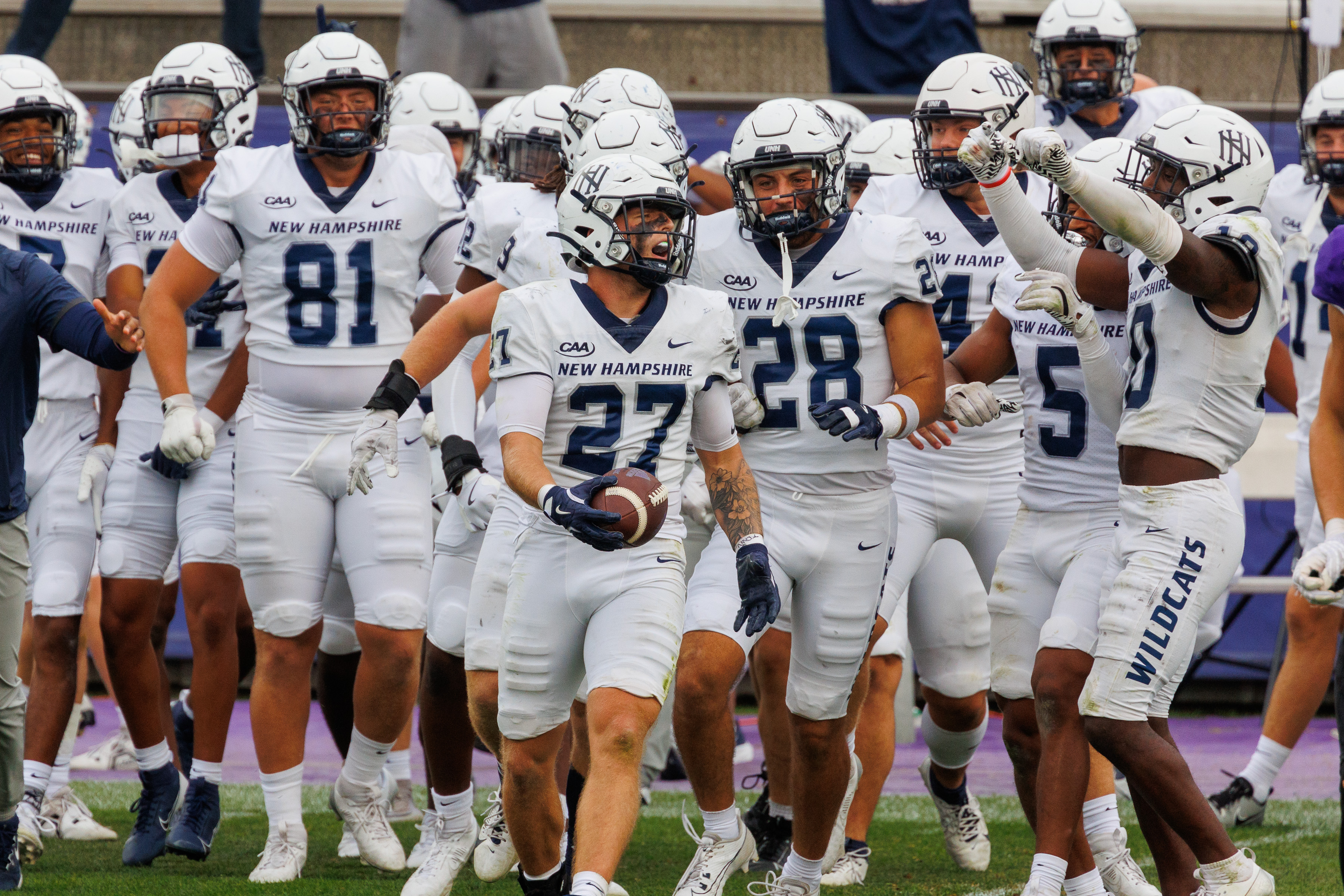
The 2024 Wildcats

Year	Round	Opponent	Result
1991	First Round	Samford	L 13–29
1994	First Round	Appalachian State	L 10–17
2004	First Round; Quarterfinals	Georgia Southern; Montana	W 27–23; L 17–47
2005	First Round; Quarterfinals	Colgate; Northern Iowa	W 55–21; L 21–24
2006	First Round; Quarterfinals	Hampton; Massachusetts	W 41–38; L 17–24
2007	First Round	Northern Iowa	L 35–38
2008	First Round; Quarterfinals	Southern Illinois; Northern Iowa	W 29–20; L 34–36
2009	First Round; Quarterfinals	McNeese State; Villanova	W 49–13; L 7–46
2010	Second Round; Quarterfinals	Bethune-Cookman; Delaware	W 45–20; L 3–16
2011	Second Round	Montana State	L 25–26
2012	Second Round	Wofford	L 7–23
2013	First Round; Second Round; Quarterfinals; Semifinals	Lafayette; Maine; Southeastern Louisiana; North Dakota State	W 45–7; W 41–27; W 20–17; L 14–52
2014	Second Round; Quarterfinals; Semifinals	Fordham; Chattanooga; Illinois State	W 44–19; W 35–30; L 18–21
2015	First Round	Colgate	L 20–27
2016	First Round; Second Round	Lehigh; James Madison	W 64–21; L 22–55
2017	First Round; Second Round; Quarterfinals	Central Connecticut; Central Arkansas; South Dakota State	W 14–0; W 21–15; L 14–56
2022	First Round; Second Round	Fordham; Holy Cross	W 52–42; L 19–35
2024	First Round	UT Martin	L 10–41
2025	First Round	South Dakota State	L 3-41

== Rivalries ==
=== Maine ===
The football programs of New Hampshire and the Maine Black Bears first met in 1903, and have met annually since 1922, except for two season during World War II and during the 2020 season due to impact from the COVID-19 pandemic. Since 1948, the winning team gets possession of an antique musket until the next season's game. The teams met for the 100th time in 2010.

=== UMass ===
The football programs of New Hampshire and the UMass Minutemen first met in 1897, and most recently in 2011, which was their 74th meeting. Since 1986, the most outstanding player of the matchup has been awarded the Bill Knight Trophy. However, the future of the rivalry is in question, as the two programs are now in different NCAA football classifications.

=== Dartmouth ===
The football programs of New Hampshire and the Dartmouth Big Green first met in 1901, and most recently met in 2025, their 43rd meeting.

== Donation controversy ==
A longtime UNH librarian, Robert Morin, died in 2015 and left $4 million to the University; $1 million of that money was spent on a new video scoreboard for the football stadium, and the decision to spend so much of the donation on a scoreboard became a controversial topic. University officials explained that there was no instruction on how to spend the money, other than $100,000 for the library. It was also noted that Morin started watching and became particularly interested in football towards the end of his life.

== Future non-conference opponents ==
Announced schedules as of December 16, 2025.

2026	2027	2028	2029	2030
at Syracuse (FBS)	at Ohio State (FBS)	at Boston College (FBS)	at LIU	LIU
Stonehill	Dartmouth	at Dartmouth		
Harvard				
at Merrimack				

Note: FBS denotes a team that plays in the Football Bowl Subdivision.
