= List of UMass Minutemen football seasons =

The UMass Minutemen are a college football team that competes in the National Collegiate Athletic Association (NCAA) Division I Football Bowl Subdivision (FBS). The team fielded its first football team during the 1879 season.

The following is a list of UMass Minutemen football seasons.

== Seasons ==
| Year | Team | Overall | Conference | Standing | Bowl/playoffs | Coaches^{#} | AP^{°} |
|---|---|---|---|---|---|---|---|
No Coach (Independent) (1879–1896)
| 1879 | Massachusetts | 1–0 | | | | | |
| 1880 | Massachusetts | 0–1–1 | | | | | |
| 1881 | Massachusetts | 2–1–1 | | | | | |
| 1882 | Massachusetts | 0–2 | | | | | |
| 1883 | Massachusetts | 1–1 | | | | | |
| 1884 | Massachusetts | 1–2 | | | | | |
| 1885 | Massachusetts | 3–2–1 | | | | | |
| 1886 | Massachusetts | 2–1 | | | | | |
| 1887 | Massachusetts | 2–3 | | | | | |
| 1888 | Massachusetts | 2–4 | | | | | |
| 1889 | Massachusetts | 2–0 | | | | | |
| 1890 | Massachusetts | 1–4 | | | | | |
| 1891 | Massachusetts | 2–5 | | | | | |
| 1892 | Massachusetts | 4–6–2 | | | | | |
| 1893 | Massachusetts | 1–9 | | | | | |
| 1894 | Massachusetts | 3–3 | | | | | |
| 1895 | Massachusetts | 1–5 | | | | | |
| 1896 | Massachusetts | 0–4 | | | | | |
No Coach (ALNESC) (1897)
| 1897 | Massachusetts | 2–5–1 | 1–0 | 1st | | | |
David F. Weeks (ALNESC) (1898)
| 1898 | Massachusetts | 1–4–1 | 0–0 | | | | |
Fred W. Murphy (ALNESC) (1899–1900)
| 1899 | Massachusetts | 7–3 | 1–0 | 1st | | | |
| 1900 | Massachusetts | 5–5 | 1–0 | 1st | | | |
James Halligan (ALNESC) (1901–1903)
| 1901 | Massachusetts | 9–1 | 0–0 | 3rd | | | |
| 1902 | Massachusetts | 2–3–2 | 0–0 | | | | |
| 1903 | Massachusetts | 5–4 | 1-0 | 1st | | | |
Matthew W. Bullock (ALNESC) (1904)
| 1904 | Massachusetts | 5–2–1 | 0-0 | 3rd | | | |
Walter Craig (ALNESC) (1905)
| 1905 | Massachusetts | 3–7 | 1-0 | 1st | | | |
George E. O'Hearn (ALNESC) (1906)
| 1906 | Massachusetts | 1–7–1 | 0-0 | | | | |
Matthew W. Bullock (ALNESC) (1907–1908)
| 1907 | Massachusetts | 5–3–1 | 1–0 | 1st | | | |
| 1908 | Massachusetts | 3–3–3 | 1–0 | 1st | | | |
J. W. Gage (ALNESC) (1909)
| 1909 | Massachusetts | 1–6–2 | 0–0 | 3rd | | | |
Willard Gildersleeve (ALNESC) (1910)
| 1910 | Massachusetts | 1–6–2 | 0–0–1 | 2nd | | | |
Jack Hubbard (ALNESC) (1911)
| 1911 | Massachusetts | 2–7 | 0–1 | 2nd | | | |
Arthur Brides (ALNESC) (1912–1915)
| 1912 | Massachusetts | 2–5–2 | 0–1 | 2nd | | | |
| 1913 | Massachusetts | 4–3 | 0–0 | | | | |
| 1914 | Massachusetts | 2–5 | 0–0 | | | | |
| 1915 | Massachusetts | 4–2–2 | 0–0 | 3rd | | | |
George Melican (ALNESC) (1916)
| 1916 | Massachusetts | 2–4–2 | 1–0 | T–1st | | | |
Harold Gore (ALNESC) (1919–1922)
| 1919 | Massachusetts | 5–2–1 | 2–0 | 1st | | | |
| 1920 | Massachusetts | 5–2–1 | 1–0–1 | 1st | | | |
| 1921 | Massachusetts | 3–4–1 | 1–1 | 2nd | | | |
| 1922 | Massachusetts | 5–3 | 1–0 | 1st | | | |
Harold Gore (New England Conference) (1923–1927)
| 1923 | Massachusetts | 2–5 | 0–0 | 5th | | | |
| 1924 | Massachusetts | 6–1–1 | 0–1 | 4th | | | |
| 1925 | Massachusetts | 6–2 | 1–0 | 3rd | | | |
| 1926 | Massachusetts | 1–6 | 0–1 | 4th | | | |
| 1927 | Massachusetts | 0–7–1 | 0–0 | 5th | | | |
Charles McGeoch (New England Conference) (1928–1929)
| 1928 | Massachusetts | 2–5–1 | 0–0 | 5th | | | |
| 1929 | Massachusetts | 3–4–1 | 0–0 | 5th | | | |
Charles McGeoch (Independent) (1930)
| 1930 | Massachusetts | 1–8 | | | | | |
Mel Taube (Independent) (1931–1935)
| 1931 | Massachusetts State | 7–1–1 | | | | | |
| 1932 | Massachusetts State | 7–2 | | | | | |
| 1933 | Massachusetts State | 5–3 | | | | | |
| 1934 | Massachusetts State | 5–3–1 | | | | | |
| 1935 | Massachusetts State | 5–4 | | | | | |
Elbert Caraway (Independent) (1936–1940)
| 1936 | Massachusetts State | 2–6 | | | | | |
| 1937 | Massachusetts State | 1–7–1 | | | | | |
| 1938 | Massachusetts State | 3–6 | | | | | |
| 1939 | Massachusetts State | 2–5–2 | | | | | |
| 1940 | Massachusetts State | 1–8 | | | | | |
Walter Hargesheimer (Independent) (1941–1942)
| 1941 | Massachusetts State | 3–4–1 | | | | | |
| 1942 | Massachusetts State | 2–5 | | | | | |
Thomas Eck (Independent) (1945)
| 1945 | Massachusetts State | 2–1–1 | | | | | |
Walter Hargesheimer (Independent) (1946)
| 1946 | Massachusetts State | 6–2 | | | | | |
Thomas Eck (Yankee Conference) (1947–1951)
| 1947 | Massachusetts State | 3–4–1 | 0–1–1 | T–5th | | | |
| 1948 | UMass | 3–4–1 | 1–1 | 4th | | | |
| 1949 | UMass | 3–5 | 1–1 | 3rd | | | |
| 1950 | UMass | 3–5 | 1–1 | 4th | | | |
| 1951 | UMass | 3–4–1 | 2–0 | 2nd | | | |
Charlie O'Rourke (Yankee Conference) (1952–1959)
| 1952 | UMass | 4–3–1 | 1–2 | 4th | | | |
| 1953 | UMass | 1–7 | 0–3 | 6th | | | |
| 1954 | UMass | 4–4 | 1–3 | 5th | | | |
| 1955 | UMass | 4–4 | 1–3 | 5th | | | |
| 1956 | UMass | 2–5–1 | 1–4 | 5th | | | |
| 1957 | UMass | 1–5–1 | 1–2–1 | 4th | | | |
| 1958 | UMass | 2–6 | 1–3 | 4th | | | |
| 1959 | UMass | 3–5–1 | 2–2 | 2nd | | | |
Chuck Studley (Yankee Conference) (1960)
| 1960 | UMass | 7–2 | 3–1 | T–1st | | | |
Vic Fusia (Yankee Conference) (1961–1970)
| 1961 | UMass | 5–4 | 3–1 | 2nd | | | |
| 1962 | UMass | 6–3 | 4–1 | 2nd | | | |
| 1963 | UMass | 8–0–1 | 5–0 | 1st | | 3 | 4 |
| 1964 | UMass | 8–2 | 5–0 | 1st | L Tangerine | 3 | 7 |
| 1965 | UMass | 7–2 | 4–1 | 2nd | | | |
| 1966 | UMass | 6–3 | 5–0 | 1st | | 10 | |
| 1967 | UMass | 7–2 | 5–0 | 1st | | | |
| 1968 | UMass | 2–8 | 2–3 | T–3rd | | | |
| 1969 | UMass | 6–3 | 5–0 | 1st | | | |
| 1970 | UMass | 4–5–1 | 3–1–1 | 2nd | | | |
Dick MacPherson (Yankee Conference) (1971–1977)
| 1971 | UMass | 4–4–1 | 3–1–1 | T–1st | | | |
| 1972 | UMass | 9–2 | 5–0 | 1st | W Boardwalk | | |
| 1973 | UMass | 6–5 | 4–2 | 3rd | | | |
| 1974 | UMass | 5–6 | 4–2 | T–1st | | | |
| 1975 | UMass | 8–2 | 4–1 | 2nd | | | |
| 1976 | UMass | 5–5 | 3–2 | 2nd | | | |
| 1977 | UMass | 8–3 | 5–0 | 1st | L Division II Quarterfinal | | 2 |
Bob Pickett (Yankee Conference) (1978–1983)
| 1978 | UMass | 9–4 | 5–0 | 1st | L Division I-AA Championship | | 4 |
| 1979 | UMass | 6–4 | 4–1 | T–1st | | | |
| 1980 | UMass | 7–3 | 4–1 | 2nd | | | 10 |
| 1981 | UMass | 6–3 | 4–1 | T–1st | | | |
| 1982 | UMass | 5–6 | 3–2 | T–1st | | | |
| 1983 | UMass | 3–8 | 2–3 | T–4th | | | |
Bob Stull (Yankee Conference) (1984–1985)
| 1984 | UMass | 3–8 | 1–4 | 5th | | | |
| 1985 | UMass | 7–4 | 4–1 | 2nd | | | |
Jim Reid (Yankee Conference) (1986–1991)
| 1986 | UMass | 8–3 | 5–2 | T–1st | | | |
| 1987 | UMass | 3–8 | 2–5 | T–5th | | | |
| 1988 | UMass | 8–4 | 6–2 | T–1st | L Division I-AA First Round | 10 | |
| 1989 | UMass | 5–5–1 | 3–5 | 7th | | | |
| 1990 | UMass | 8–2–1 | 7–1 | 1st | L Division I-AA First Round | 9 | |
| 1991 | UMass | 7–3 | 3–5 | T–4th | | | |
Mike Hodges (Yankee Conference) (1992–1996)
| 1992 | UMass | 7–3 | 5–3 | 3rd | | | |
| 1993 | UMass | 9–2 | 6–2 | 2nd (New England) | | 25 (Note: Rankings from The Sports Network poll) | |
| 1994 | UMass | 5–6 | 4–4 | 3rd (New England) | | | |
| 1995 | UMass | 6–5 | 3–5 | 4th (New England) | | | |
| 1996 | UMass | 6–5 | 4–4 | 3rd (New England) | | | |
Mike Hodges (Atlantic 10 Conference) (1997)
| 1997 | UMass | 2–9 | 1–7 | 5th (New England) | | | |
Mark Whipple (Atlantic 10 Conference) (1998–2003)
| 1998 | UMass | 12–3 | 6–2 | T–1st (New England) | W Division I-AA Championship | 1 | |
| 1999 | UMass | 9–4 | 7–1 | T–1st | L Division I-AA Quarterfinal | 7 | |
| 2000 | UMass | 7–4 | 5–3 | 3rd | | | |
| 2001 | UMass | 3–8 | 3–6 | T–8th | | | |
| 2002 | UMass | 8–4 | 6–3 | T–3rd | | | |
| 2003 | UMass | 10–3 | 8–1 | T–1st | L Division I-AA First Round | 11 | |
Don Brown (Atlantic 10 Conference / Colonial Athletic Association) (2004–2008)
| 2004 | UMass | 6–5 | 4–4 | T–2nd (North) | | | |
| 2005 | UMass | 7–4 | 6–2 | 2nd (North) | | 19 | |
| 2006 | UMass | 13–2 | 8–0 | 1st (North) | L Division I Championship | 2 | |
| 2007 | UMass | 10–3 | 7–1 | 1st (North) | L Division I Quarterfinal | 7 | |
| 2008 | UMass | 7–5 | 4–4 | 3rd (North) | | | |
Kevin Morris (Colonial Athletic Association) (2009–2011)
| 2009 | UMass | 5–6 | 3–5 | T–8th | | | |
| 2010 | UMass | 6–5 | 4–4 | 5th | | | |
| 2011 | UMass | 5–6 | 0–0* | N/A | | | |
Charley Molnar (Mid-American Conference) (2012–2013)
| 2012 | UMass | 1–11 | 1–7 | 6th (East) | | | |
| 2013 | UMass | 1–11 | 1–7 | 6th (East) | | | |
Mark Whipple (Mid-American Conference) (2014–2015)
| 2014 | UMass | 3–9 | 3–5 | T–4th (East) | | | |
| 2015 | UMass | 3–9 | 2–6 | T–5th (East) | | | |
Mark Whipple (FBS independent) (2016–2018)
| 2016 | UMass | 2–10 | | | | | |
| 2017 | UMass | 4–8 | | | | | |
| 2018 | UMass | 4–8 | | | | | |
Walt Bell (FBS independent) (2019–2021)
| 2019 | UMass | 1–11 | | | | | |
| 2020 | UMass | 0–4 | | | | | |
| 2021 | UMass | 1–11 | | | | | |
Don Brown (FBS independent) (2022–2024)
| 2022 | UMass | 1–11 | | | | | |
| 2023 | UMass | 3–9 | | | | | |
| 2024 | UMass | 2–10 (Note: Don Brown was fired ten games into the 2024 season. Offensive coordinator Shane Montgomery served as interim head coach for the remainder of the season.) | | | | | |
Joe Harasymiak (Mid-American Conference) (2025–present)
| 2025 | UMass | 0–12 | 0–8 | 13th | | | |
| Total: | | 584–657–51 (.472) | | | | | |
National championship Conference title Conference division title or championship game berth
