= 1922 Massachusetts Aggies football team =

American college football season

1922 Massachusetts Aggies football
- Conference: Athletic League of New England State Colleges
- Record: 5–3 ( ALNESC)
- Head coach: Harold Gore (4th season)
- Home stadium: Alumni Field

The 1922 Massachusetts Aggies football team represented Massachusetts Agricultural College in the 1922 college football season. The team was coached by Harold Gore and played its home games at Alumni Field in Amherst, Massachusetts. Massachusetts finished the season with a record of 5–3.

== Schedule ==
Date	Opponent	Site	Result
October 7	Connecticut	Alumni Field; Amherst, MA (rivalry)	W 13–6
October 14	Worcester Tech	Alumni Field; Amherst, MA	W 23–0
October 21	at Amherst	Pratt Field; Amherst, MA	W 10–6
October 28	New Hampshire	Alumni Field; Amherst, MA (rivalry)	W 12–10
November 4	Bates	Alumni Field; Amherst, MA	L 0–6
November 11	at Stevens	Hoboken, NJ	W 13–0
November 18	at Tufts	Tufts Oval; Somerville, MA	L 6–9
November 25	at Michigan Agricultural	Old College Field; East Lansing, MI	L 0–45
