= 1914 Maine Black Bears football team =

American college football season

1914 Maine Black Bears football
- Conference: Maine Intercollegiate Athletic Association
- Record: 6–3 (2–1 MIAA)
- Head coach: Eddie Cochems (1st season)
- Captain: David Baker
- Home stadium: Alumni Field

The 1914 Maine Black Bears football team was an American football team that represented the University of Maine during the 1914 college football season. The team compiled a 6–3 record. David Baker was the team captain.

Passing game innovator Eddie Cochems was hired as Maine's head football coach in April 1914. He served only one season as Maine's head coach.

== Schedule ==
Date	Opponent	Site	Result	Attendance	Source
September 21	Fort McKinley*	Alumni Field; Orono, ME	W 46–2		
September 28	at Yale*	Yale Field; New Haven, CT	L 0–20		
October 3	Boston College*	Alumni Field; Orono, ME	W 26–7		
October 10	vs. Vermont*	Manchester, NH	W 21–0		
October 17	Norwich*	Alumni Field; Orono, ME	W 64–0		
October 24	Bates	Alumni Field; Orono, ME	W 37–0		
October 31	at Colby	Seaverns Field; Waterville, ME	L 0–14		
November 7	Bowdoin	Alumni Field; Orono, ME	W 27–0		
November 14	at Army*	The Plain; West Point, NY	L 0–28		
*Non-conference game
