= Myron Fuller =

American football player and coach (1889–1949)

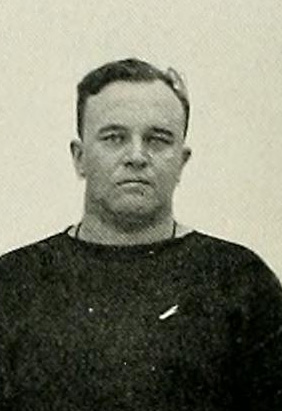
- Fuller pictured in 1922

Biographical details
- Born: June 4, 1889; Boston, Massachusetts, U.S.
- Died: August 31, 1949 (aged 60); Mountain Lakes, New Jersey, U.S.

Playing career
- 1910: Yale
- Positions: Guard, tackle

Coaching career (HC unless noted)
- 1912–1913: Stevens
- 1914–1915: Colby
- 1916: Haverford School
- 1917: Swarthmore (assistant)
- 1918: Hog Island Shipyard
- 1919: West Virginia (line)
- 1920: North Carolina
- 1921: Tulane
- 1922–1927: Yale (line)

Head coaching record
- Bowls: 17–33 (college)

Accomplishments and honors

Championships
- 1 Maine Intercollegiate Athletic Association (1914)

Myron Elmer Fuller (June 4, 1889 – August 31, 1949) was an American football player and coach.

== Playing career ==
Fuller played football at Yale University in 1910 and graduated from the school in 1911.

== Coaching career ==
He served as the head coach at Stevens Institute of Technology (1912–1913) Colby College (1914–1915), Haverford School (1916), the University of North Carolina at Chapel Hill (1920), and Tulane University (1921). He later served as a line coach for the Yale Bulldogs. His 1914 Colby team is considered to be one of the strongest college teams ever in the state of Maine. Colby defeated their opponents by a combined score of 277 to 49, swept in-state rivals Maine, Bowdoin, and Bates, beat Holy Cross 17 to 0, and nearly upset Navy in a 31 to 21 game.

== Later life and death ==
Fuller left coaching after 1927 to pursue a career in industrial engineering. He died of a heart attack at his home in Mountain Lakes, New Jersey, on August 31, 1949, at the age of 60.

== Head coaching record ==
=== College ===
Year	Team	Overall	Conference	Standing	Bowl/playoffs
Stevens (Independent) (1912–1913)
1912	Stevens	1–9			
1913	Stevens	2–6			
Stevens:		3–15			
Colby Mules (Maine Intercollegiate Athletic Association) (1914–1915)
1914	Colby	6–2	3–0	1st	
1915	Colby	4–4	2–1		
Stevens:		10–6	5–1		
North Carolina Tar Heels (South Atlantic Intercollegiate Athletic Association) (1920)
1920	North Carolina	2–6	0–5	15th	
North Carolina:		2–6	0–5		
Tulane Green Wave (Southern Intercollegiate Athletic Association) (1921)
1921	Tulane	4–6	3–3	13th	
Tulane:		4–6	3–3		
Total:		17–33			
