= 1908 Massachusetts Aggies football team =

American college football season

1908 Massachusetts Aggies football
- Conference: Athletic League of New England State Colleges
- Record: 3–3–3 ( Athletic League of New England State Colleges)
- Head coach: Matthew W. Bullock (3rd season)
- Home stadium: Alumni Field

The 1908 Massachusetts Aggies football team represented Massachusetts Agricultural College in the 1908 college football season. The team was coached by Matthew W. Bullock and played its home games at Alumni Field in Amherst, Massachusetts. The 1908 season was Bullock's last as head coach of the Aggies. Massachusetts finished the season with a record of 3–3–3.

== Schedule ==
Date	Opponent	Site	Result	Attendance	Source
September 26	Rhode Island State	Alumni Field; Amherst, MA	W 2–0		
October 3	at Dartmouth	Alumni Oval; Hanover, NH	L 0–23		
October 14	at Vermont	Centennial Field; Burlington, VT	T 6–6		
October 17	Worcester Tech	Alumni Field; Amherst, MA	W 11–5		
October 24	at Williams	Weston Field; Williamstown, MA	L 0–40		
October 31	at Yale	Yale Field; New Haven, CT	L 0–49		
November 7	at New Hampshire	Manchester, NH (rivalry)	W 13–9	1,500+	
November 14	at Springfield Training School	Springfield, MA	T 5–5		
November 21	at Tufts	Tufts Oval; Somerville, MA	T 6–6		
