= 1914 Massachusetts Aggies football team =

American college football season

1914 Massachusetts Aggies football
- Conference: Athletic League of New England State Colleges
- Record: 2–5 ( Athletic League of New England State Colleges)
- Head coach: Arthur Brides (3rd season)
- Home stadium: Alumni Field

The 1914 Massachusetts Aggies football team represented Massachusetts Agricultural College in the 1914 college football season. The team was coached by Arthur Brides and played its home games at Alumni Field in Amherst, Massachusetts. Massachusetts finished the season with a record of 2–5.

== Schedule ==
Date	Opponent	Site	Result	Source
September 26	at Dartmouth	Alumni Oval; Hanover, NH	L 6–29	
October 3	at Holy Cross	Fitton Field; Worcester, MA	W 14–0	
October 10	at Colgate	Hamilton, NY	L 0–25	
October 17	at Colby	Waterville, ME	L 0–6	
October 31	at Tufts	Tufts Oval; Somerville, MA	L 6–7	
November 7	Middlebury	Alumni Field; Amherst, MA	W 7–0	
November 14	at Springfield YMCA	Pratt Field; Springfield, MA	L 3–17	
