= 1898 Massachusetts Aggies football team =

American college football season

1898 Massachusetts Aggies football
- Conference: Athletic League of New England State Colleges
- Record: 1–4–1 ( Athletic League of New England State Colleges)
- Head coach: David F. Weeks (1st season)
- Home stadium: Alumni Field

The 1898 Massachusetts Aggies football team represented Massachusetts Agricultural College in the 1898 college football season. The team was coached by David F. Weeks and played its home games at Alumni Field in Amherst, Massachusetts. Weeks became the first official head coach of the Aggies this campaign. Massachusetts finished the season with a record of 1–4–1.

== Schedule ==
Note: All scores/opponents sourced from Carlson 1988.

Date	Opponent	Site	Result	Source
September 24	Holy Cross	Alumni Field; Amherst, MA	L 0–23	
October 1	at Worcester Tech	Worcester, MA	0–6	
October 8	at Amherst	Pratt Field; Amherst, MA	T 0–0	
October 15	Vermont Academy	Alumni Field; Amherst, MA	W 40–0	
October 22	at Williston Seminary	Easthampton, MA	L 0–6	
November 12	Worcester Tech	Alumni Field; Amherst, MA	L 0–11	
