= 1921 Connecticut Aggies football team =

American college football season

1921 Connecticut Aggies football
- Conference: Athletic League of New England State Colleges
- Record: 3–2–3 (0–2 New England)
- Head coach: J. Wilder Tasker (1st season)
- Home stadium: Gardner Dow Athletic Fields

The 1921 Connecticut Aggies football team represented Connecticut Agricultural College, now the University of Connecticut, in the 1921 college football season. The Aggies were led by first-year head coach J. Wilder Tasker, and completed the season with a record of 3–2–3.

== Schedule ==
Date	Opponent	Site	Result
October 1	Massachusetts	Gardner Dow Athletic Fields; Storrs, CT (rivalry)	L 0–13
October 8	Trinity (CT)*	Gardner Dow Athletic Fields; Storrs, CT	T 0–0
October 15	St. Stephen's (NY)*	Gardner Dow Athletic Fields; Storrs, CT	W 21–0
October 22	at Lowell Textile*	Lowell, MA	T 7–7
October 29	Worcester Tech*	Gardner Dow Athletic Fields; Storrs, CT	W 27–14
November 5	St. Lawrence*	Gardner Dow Athletic Fields; Storrs, CT	W 39–14
November 12	at Pennsylvania Military*	Chester, PA	T 0–0
November 19	at Rhode Island State	Kingston, RI (rivalry)	L 21–27
*Non-conference game
