= 1921 Massachusetts Aggies football team =

American college football season

1921 Massachusetts Aggies football
- Conference: Athletic League of New England State Colleges
- Record: 3–4–1 ( ALNESC)
- Head coach: Harold Gore (3rd season)
- Home stadium: Alumni Field

The 1921 Massachusetts Aggies football team represented Massachusetts Agricultural College in the 1921 college football season. The team was coached by Harold Gore and played its home games at Alumni Field in Amherst, Massachusetts. Massachusetts finished the season with a record of 3–4–1.

== Schedule ==
Date	Opponent	Site	Result	Source
October 1	at Connecticut	Gardner Dow Athletic Fields; Storrs, CT (rivalry)	W 13–0	
October 8	at Bates	Garcelon Field; Lewiston, ME	T 0–0	
October 15	at Worcester Tech	Alumni Field; Worcester, MA	W 35–0	
October 22	at Amherst	Pratt Field; Amherst, MA	L 0–13	
October 29	Vermont	Alumni Field; Amherst, MA	L 7–14	
November 5	at Rhode Island State	Kingston, RI	L 2–7	
November 12	New Hampshire	Alumni Field; Amherst, MA (rivalry)	L 7–56	
November 19	Tufts	Alumni Field; Amherst, MA	W 14–0	
