= 1912 Massachusetts Aggies football team =

American college football season

1912 Massachusetts Aggies football
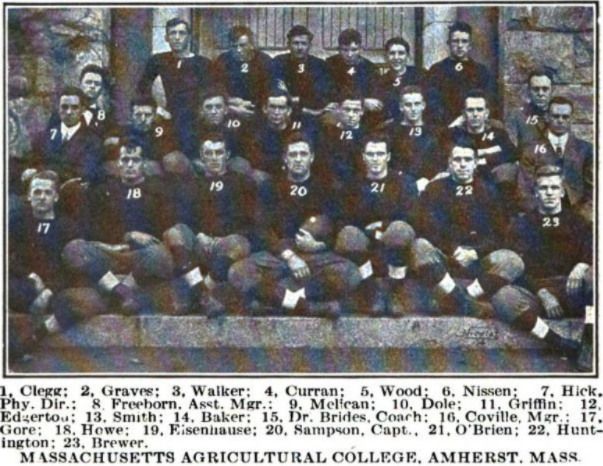
- Conference: Athletic League of New England State Colleges
- Record: 2–5–2 ( Athletic League of New England State Colleges)
- Head coach: Arthur Brides (1st season)
- Home stadium: Alumni Field

The 1912 Massachusetts Aggies football team represented Massachusetts Agricultural College in the 1912 college football season. The team was coached by Arthur Brides and played its home games at Alumni Field in Amherst, Massachusetts. The 1912 season was Brides' first as head coach of the Aggies. Massachusetts finished the season with a record of 2–5–2.

== Schedule ==
Date	Opponent	Site	Result	Source
September 21	Rhode Island State	Alumni Field; Amherst, MA	L 0–7	
September 28	at Union (NY)	Schenectady, NY	T 0–0	
October 5	at Dartmouth	Alumni Oval; Hanover, NH	L 0–47	
October 12	Boston College	Alumni Field; Amherst, MA (rivalry)	W 42–0	
October 19	at Vermont	Centennial Field; Burlington, VT	L 7–9	
October 26	at Holy Cross	Fitton Field; Worcester, MA	T 6–6	
November 2	at Tufts	Tufts Oval; Somerville, MA	L 0–13	
November 9	at New Hampshire	Manchester, NH (rivalry)	W 21–3	
November 16	at Springfield Training School	Pratt Field; Springfield, MA	L 0–41	
