= 1907 Massachusetts Aggies football team =

American college football season

1907 Massachusetts Aggies football
- Conference: Athletic League of New England State Colleges
- Record: 5–3–1 ( Athletic League of New England State Colleges)
- Head coach: Matthew W. Bullock (2nd season)
- Captain: George Cobb
- Home stadium: Alumni Field

The 1907 Massachusetts Aggies football team represented Massachusetts Agricultural College in the 1907 college football season. The team was coached by Matthew W. Bullock and played its home games at Alumni Field in Amherst, Massachusetts. The 1907 season marked Bullock's return to the Aggies, as he had previously coached the team during the 1904 season. Massachusetts finished the season with a record of 5–3–1.

== Schedule ==
Date	Opponent	Site	Result	Source
September 28	at Williams	Weston Field; Williamstown, MA	L 4–5	
October 2	at Brown	Andrews Field; Providence, RI	L 0–5	
October 5	Rhode Island State	Alumni Field; Amherst, MA	W 11–0	
October 12	at Dartmouth	Alumni Oval; Hanover, NH	L 0–6	
October 19	at Holy Cross	Worcester Oval; Worcester, MA	W 10–5	
October 26	Worcester Tech	Alumni Field; Amherst, MA	W 29–0	
November 2	at Amherst	Pratt Field; Amherst, MA	T 0–0	
November 9	at Tufts	Tufts Oval; Somerville, MA	W 19–10	
November 16	at Springfield Training School	Springfield, MA	W 5–0	
