= 1914 Colby Mules football team =

American college football season

1914 Colby Mules football
- Team photo in The Colby Oracle yearbook

MIAA champion
- Conference: Maine Intercollegiate Athletic Association
- Record: 6–2 (3–0 MIAA)
- Head coach: Myron Fuller (1st season)
- Captain: Ginger Fraser
- Home stadium: Seaverns Field

The 1914 Colby Mules football team represented Colby College during the 1914 college football season. The team has been described as the greatest in Colby history as well as one of the strongest college teams ever in the state of Maine. Colby defeated its three in-state rivals—Bowdoin, Maine, and Bates—by a combined score 123 to 0 to win the series title and gained national recognition for its game against the star–studded Navy Midshipmen. The team was led by first year head coach Myron E. Fuller and captained by senior Paul "Ginger" Fraser.

== Schedule ==
Colby's 1914 schedule was announced on March 31, 1914, by manager Raymond P. Luce.

Date	Opponent	Site	Result	Source
September 26	at Holy Cross*	Fitton Field; Worcester, MA	W 17–0	
October 3	at New Hampshire*	Seaverns Field; Waterville, ME	W 66–0	
October 10	at Tufts*	Ellis Oval; Medford, MA	L 14–40	
October 17	vs. Massachusetts*	Portland, ME	W 6–0	
October 24	at Bowdoin	Whittier Field; Brunswick, ME (rivalry)	W 48–0	
October 31	at Maine	Seaverns Field; Waterville, ME	W 14–0	
November 7	at Bates	Seaverns Field; Waterville, ME	W 61–0	
November 14	at Navy*	Worden Field; Annapolis, MD	L 21–31	
*Non-conference game

== Season summary ==
=== Non-conference schedule ===
Colby started out the season on September 26 with a 17 to 0 victory against Holy Cross. Captain Ginger Fraser scored both touchdowns, kicked both point after conversions, and suffered a broken shoulder in the game. The following week, Colby defeated New Hampshire, 66 to 0, without Fraser. Colby lost its first game of the season to Tufts in October 10. Tufts won the game 40 to 14 in part by confusing Colby with its passing offense, which was uncommon at that time. However, Colby rebounded the following week with a 6 to 0 victory in a muddy game against Massachusetts in Portland, Maine.

=== State series ===
Colby started out its Maine Intercollegiate Athletic Association schedule by defeating a weak Bowdoin team, 48 to 0. The following week Colby faced the Maine, which had won the conference title the past three seasons. As Maine had defeated both Bowdoin and Bates already, the winner of this game would win the state championship. Colby scored its first touchdown on a twenty-five yard pass from Ginger Fraser to Edward Cawley. Defensively, Colby's strong line, led by Walter Dacey, was able to stop the Maine offense throughout the game. Dalcey helped set up Colby's second touchdown by recovering a fumble on Colby's 17 yard line. Colby also benefited from poor play by Maine's quarterback, George H. Bernheisel, who was benched in the second half, as well as in injury to the team's fullback. On November 2, the Lewiston Evening Journal ran the headline "Colby's Football Team Was Plainly Superior: Waterville Eleven Showed Itself Saturday to Be No One-Man Aggregation" (referring to claims that the team only had one star player, Ginger Fraser). The article described Colby's play as "brilliantly fierce" and "the most brilliant exposition of football...ever seen in this city". It also lauded Colby as coming "near possessing one of the best football teams in the history of Maine intercollegiate sport, balanced and strong, versed in every department of the game, cunning in every move." Colby finished out its in-state series against Bates. Fraser scored Colby's first two touchdowns before exiting, which allowed Jack "Smacker" Lowney to have one of the best games of his career, as he scored four touchdowns to lead the team to a 61 to 0 victory.

=== Navy game ===
Colby's final game of the season was against the Navy. Only 13 of Colby's players made the trip to Annapolis. Lowney scored three minutes into the game to take a 7 to 0 lead. Navy responded with a field goal. In the second quarter, Fraser and Downey scored rushing touchdowns (Downey's was a 75-yard run) and Navy put up a touchdown of their own to give Colby a 21 to 10 lead going into the half. However, Navy was able to put up three unanswered touchdowns to defeat Colby, 31 to 21. Navy was able to make substitutions while Colby was forced to play its team manager and assistant manager due to injuries. After the game, a sportswriter for The New York Times proclaimed it to be "one of the finest exhibitions of football ever seen in Annapolis."
