= Ginger Fraser =

American football player, coach, and military officer (1892–1938)

Biographical details
- Born: November 15, 1892; Dorchester, Massachusetts
- Died: April 11, 1938 (aged 45); Westbrook, Maine

Playing career
- 1911–1914: Colby

Coaching career (HC unless noted)
- 1915: Waterville HS (ME)
- 1916: Everett HS (MA)
- 1919–1921: Coburn Classical (ME)
- 1922–1927: Westbrook HS (ME)
- 1928–1929: Bowdoin (assistant)
- 1930–1931: Westbrook HS (ME)

Accomplishments and honors

Championships
- 1926 Maine state championship

Paul F. "Ginger" Fraser (November 15, 1892 – April 11, 1938) was an American football player, coach, and military officer. He was considered to be one of Maine's all-time greatest college football players.

== Early life ==
Fraser was born in Boston's Roxbury neighborhood. He attended Boston Latin School in 1907 and 1908, where he played end, center, and halfback on the football team and outfield on the baseball team. He then attended Dorchester High School in 1909 and 1910, where he played in the backfield on the football team and second base on the baseball team. He was a named to the greater Boston all-scholastic football team two years.

== College ==
Fraser attended Colby College, where he played four years for the Colby Mules football team. He was the team captain in 1914. That year, Colby outscored its three in-state rivals Bowdoin College, the University of Maine, and Bates College 123 to 0 to win the series title. Colby also gained national recognition for its game against the star–studded Navy Midshipmen. Colby led Navy 21–10 at the half, but due to Navy's superior manpower, it was able to use a great number of substitutes in the second half, which helped the team score 21 unanswered points and win the game 31–21. After the game, a New York Times sportswriter wrote "It was one of the finest exhibitions of football ever seen at Annapolis. In the first half the brilliant running of [Edward] Cawley, [John] Lowney, and Fraser swept the Midshipmen off their feet."

== Coaching ==
After graduating in 1915, Fraser served as sub-master and athletic director at Waterville High School in Waterville, Maine. On April 27, 1916, the Everett, Massachusetts School Committee unanimously voted to hire Fraser to coach football and baseball and teach science. He succeeded Cleo O'Donnell, who became head coach of the Purdue Boilermakers football team.

During World War I, Fraser tried to enter government service, but was initially rejected due to poor eyesight. He instead joined the YMCA, which maintained camps at the rear of the fighting lines. On April 30, 1917 he was ordered to report to his YMCA in Portland, Maine. Everett High granted him an indefinite leave of absence. That December, Fraser was selected for the Officers' Training Corps and assigned to Fort Oglethorpe in Georgia. He was later transferred to Camp Wadsworth in Spartanburg, South Carolina, where he excelled in wrestling. He was eventually assigned to the 1st Maine Heavy Artillery Regiment as a First Lieutenant.

After the War, Fraser became athletic director at the Coburn Classical Institute. In 1922 he became community athletic director for Westbrook, Maine and head football coach of the town's high school. He also served as a teacher and secretary of the Westbrook Community Association. In 1926 his team won the Maine state championship. That same year he was the referee for a football game between Bowdoin and Boston University. The game was the first in Maine and one of the first in the United States to be played with a limited number of plays (each team had thirty plays per quarter). Bowdoin won the game 6–0. In 1928 and 1929, Fraser was granted a leave of absence to serve as an assistant football coach at Bowdoin. He retired as Westbrook football coach and athletic director in June 1932, but stayed on as a teacher and community association secretary.

== Death ==
On April 11, 1938, Fraser died of a heart attack following a game of badminton. He was survived by his wife, four daughters, and two sons. In 1939, Colby College's annual "Colby Night" was renamed "Ginger Fraser Night" to honor Fraser. All of the living members of the 1914 team returned to Colby for the school's homecoming celebration.
