= Harold Gore =

American sports coach (1891–1969)

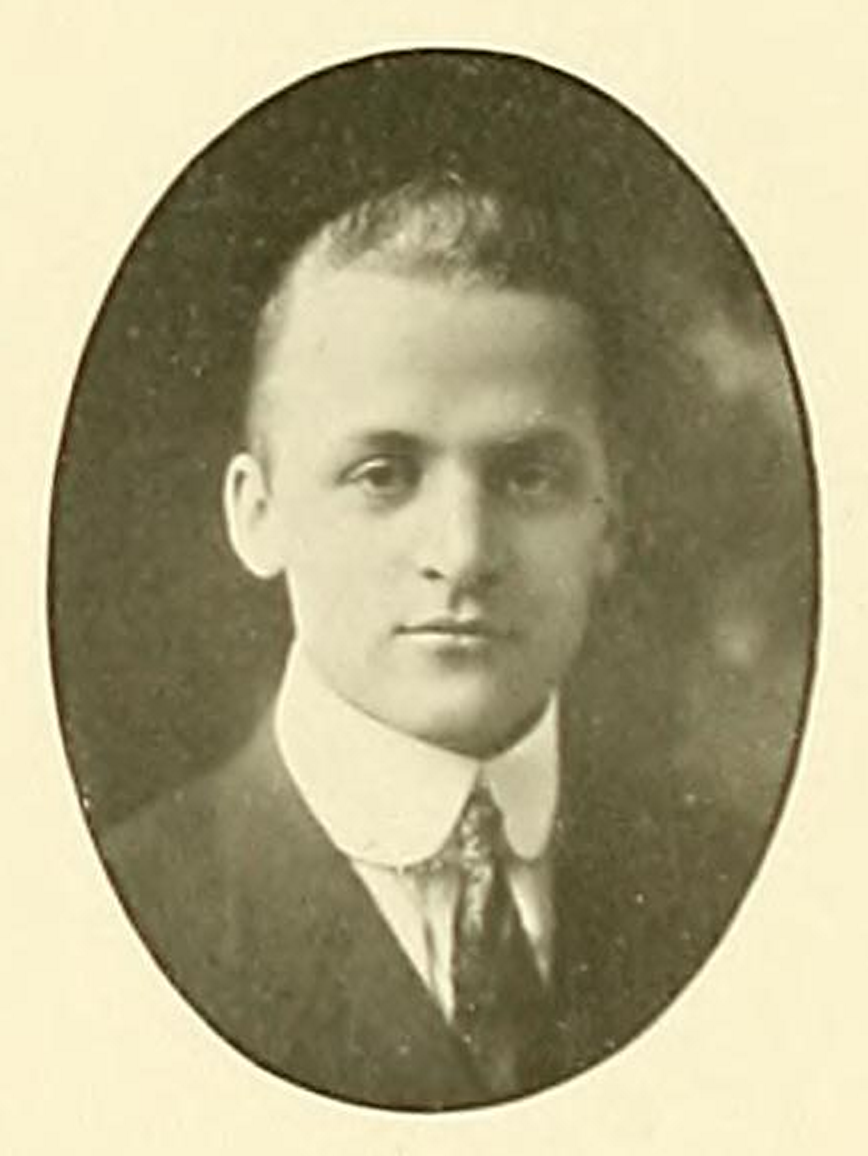
- Gore pictured in Index 1915, UMass yearbook

Biographical details
- Born: January 1, 1891; Cambridge, Massachusetts, U.S.
- Died: June 4, 1969 (aged 78); Hampshire County, Massachusetts, U.S.

Playing career

Football
- 1911–1912: Massachusetts
- Position: Quarterback

Coaching career (HC unless noted)

Football
- 1919–1927: Massachusetts

Basketball
- 1916–1917: Massachusetts
- 1918–1919: Massachusetts (interim HC)
- 1920–1929: Massachusetts

Baseball
- 1920–1922: Massachusetts

Head coaching record
- Overall: 33–32–5 (football); 85–53 (basketball); 28–20 (baseball)

Harold Martin "Kid" Gore (January 1, 1891 – June 4, 1969) was the head coach of the University of Massachusetts Amherst, football team from 1919 to 1927 (then the Massachusetts Agricultural College). He compiled a 33–32–5 overall record. Gore also served as head coach for the men's basketball team, and baseball team. Gore is the grandfather of Mark Oliver Everett, a.k.a. "E", of the independent rock band Eels.

== Head coaching record ==
=== Football ===
Year	Team	Overall	Conference	Standing	Bowl/playoffs
Massachusetts Aggies (Independent) (1919–1927)
1919	Massachusetts	5–2–1			
1920	Massachusetts	5–2–1			
1921	Massachusetts	3–4–1			
1922	Massachusetts	5–3			
1923	Massachusetts	2–5			
1924	Massachusetts	6–1–1			
1925	Massachusetts	6–2			
1926	Massachusetts	1–6			
1927	Massachusetts	0–7–1			
Massachusetts:		33–32–5			
Total:		33–32–5			

=== Basketball ===
Record table
Season	Team	Overall	Conference	Standing	Postseason
Massachusetts Aggies (Independent) (1916–1917)
1916–17	Massachusetts	4–2			
Massachusetts Aggies (Independent) (1918–1919)
1918–19	Massachusetts	3–4			
Massachusetts Aggies (Independent) (1920–1929)
1920–21	Massachusetts	7–9			
1921–22	Massachusetts	11–4			
1922–23	Massachusetts	7–5			
1923–24	Massachusetts	10–3			
1924–25	Massachusetts	11–3			
1925–26	Massachusetts	12–2			
1926–27	Massachusetts	8–5			
1927–28	Massachusetts	7–7			
1928–29	Massachusetts	5–9			
Massachusetts:		85–53			
Total:		85–53			

=== Baseball ===
Record table
Season	Team	Overall	Conference	Standing	Postseason
Massachusetts Aggies (Independent) (1920–1922)
1920	Massachusetts	6–8			
1921	Massachusetts	13–4			
1922	Massachusetts	9–8			
Massachusetts:		28–20			
Total:		28–20			
