= Arthur Brides =

American football player and coach (1885–1937)

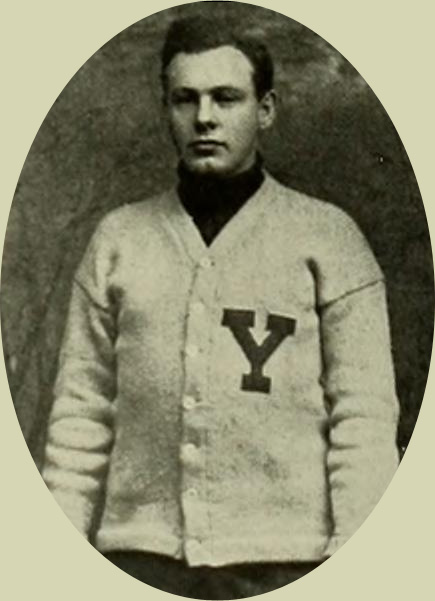
- Brides pictured in Yackety Yack 1910, North Carolina yearbook

Biographical details
- Born: October 31, 1885; Brockton, Massachusetts, U.S.
- Died: September 26, 1937 (aged 51); Stoughton, Massachusetts, U.S.

Playing career
- 1906–1908: Yale
- Position: Tackle

Coaching career (HC unless noted)
- 1909–1910: North Carolina
- 1911: Yale (line)
- 1912–1915: Massachusetts
- 1916: Yale (line)
- 1917: Yale (acting HC)
- 1919–1920: Yale (line)
- 1924–1925: Columbia (line)

Head coaching record
- Overall: 20–23–4

Accomplishments and honors

Awards
- 2× All-American (1906, 1908)

Arthur Edwards Brides (October 31, 1885 – September 26, 1937) was an American college football player and coach. He served as the head coach at the University of North Carolina at Chapel Hill from 1909 to 1910 and at Massachusetts Agricultural College—now the University of Massachusetts Amherst—from 1912 to 1915, compiling a career head coaching record of 20–23–4. He served in the United States Army during World War I and afterwards worked as a physician for the United States Veterans' Bureau.

== Playing ==
Brides was born on October 31, 1885, in Brockton, Massachusetts. He attended Brockton High School, where he played fullback and guard for three seasons and was team captain for two seasons. He then attended the Williston Seminary, where played fullback for two seasons. Brides paid for his tuition to Williston by spending his summers working for the Old Colony Street Railway and continued to work there during his summers off from Yale.

Brides entered the Yale School of Medicine in 1905 and played guard and fullback for Yale's freshman football team that fall. He was a member of the varsity squad from 1906 to 1908 and played every position except for quarterback. Charles Chadwick named Brides to his 1906 College Football All-America Team and the New Haven Register put him on their 1908 College Football All-America Team. Prior to the 1908 season, the vote for team captain ended in a tie between Brides and Robert Burch. The tie was broken by the team manager and assistant manager, who voted for Burch. According to The Boston Globe, Burch was chosen because he was an undergraduate student and the Yale captaincy had never gone to a medical school student.

== Coaching ==
Brides completed his education at University of North Carolina Medical Department at Raleigh, graduating in 1910. He coached the North Carolina Tar Heels football team during the 1909 and 1910 seasons. He then spent a year as an assistant at Yale. In 1912, Brides signed a three-year contract to coach football at the Massachusetts Agricultural College.

Brides returned to Yale in 1916 as line coach under his former teammate, Tad Jones. He was the head freshman and varsity football coach during informal 1917 season. He returned as line coach for the 1919 and 1920 seasons.

Brides returned to coaching late in the 1924 season as an assistant at Columbia. He took over line coaching duties from Paul Withington, who ascended to the head coaching position after the death of Percy Haughton. He returned for the 1925 season, but resigned on November 6 in order to devote more time to medicine.

== Medicine ==
In December 1919, Brides joined the United States Public Health Service. He was put on inactive service in September 1920. In 1921, Brides was appointed district supervisor of the Public Health Service for all of New England except for Connecticut. When the United States Veterans' Bureau was created, Brides became the manager of its Boston office. In 1922, United States Representative Sherman Everett Burroughs accused the Boston office of causing hardship to veterans through unnecessary delays and failing to respond to correspondence. Brides was exonerated by Director of the Veterans Bureau Charles R. Forbes.

On January 3, 1923, Brides and two of his subordinates were suspended by Forbes pending an investigation into charges against them. Brides faced three complaints of drunkenness, two of which were not sustained and the third, which had resulted in an arrest, but no charges, was found to have reasonable doubt due to conflicting testimony of the arresting officers. The fourth complaint, which accused Brides of obtaining liquor for hospital use and not using it for its intended purpose, was not sustained after the liquor was found intact on bureau property. The final complaint, impugning the motives of President Warren G. Harding, could not be sustained due to inconclusive evidence. After being cleared of all charges, Brides immediately offered his resignation. He was succeeded by Edgar G. Crossman. That October, Brides was appointed chief of the Bureau's medical division in New York City.

In 1933, Brides was the founding superintendent of the Norfolk Medical Center in Stoughton, Massachusetts. On December 10, 1936, his medical license was suspended for "gross misconduct in the practice of his profession". His license was restored on April 20, 1937.

== Personal life ==
In July 1907, Brides married Stella Evelyn Ryan of South Boston. The couple had met at the 1906 Harvard–Yale football game. Their marriage was not made public until over a year later. During the summer of 1909, Brides performed in vaudeville. During World War I, he served in the Battery A of the 101st Field Artillery Regiment.

On July 10, 1929, Brides was arrested in Rutland, Massachusetts and charged with reckless driving, leaving the scene of an accident, and using profanity. He was arrested again on July 17, 1936 and charged with public intoxication, driving under the influence, and operating with an expired licence after getting his vehicle stuck on a sand bank on Fieldston Beach in Marshfield, Massachusetts.

== Death ==
On September 24, 1937, Brides reported to be in considerable pain and went to bed. When he did not report for duty the following day, his associates went to his living quarters at the Norfolk Medical Center and found him dead. His death was found to be a heart attack superinduced by gail bladder ailments. He was unmarried at the time of his death and survived by his parents and three sisters. He was buried with military honors in Brockton.

== Head coaching record ==
Year	Team	Overall	Conference	Standing	Bowl/playoffs
North Carolina Tar Heels (Independent) (1909–1910)
1909	North Carolina	5–2			
1910	North Carolina	3–6			
North Carolina:		8–8			
Massachusetts Aggies (Independent) (1912–1915)
1912	Massachusetts	2–5–2			
1913	Massachusetts	4–3			
1914	Massachusetts	2–5			
1915	Massachusetts	4–2–2			
Massachusetts:		12–15–4			
Total:		20–23–4			
