= George Melican =

American football player and coach

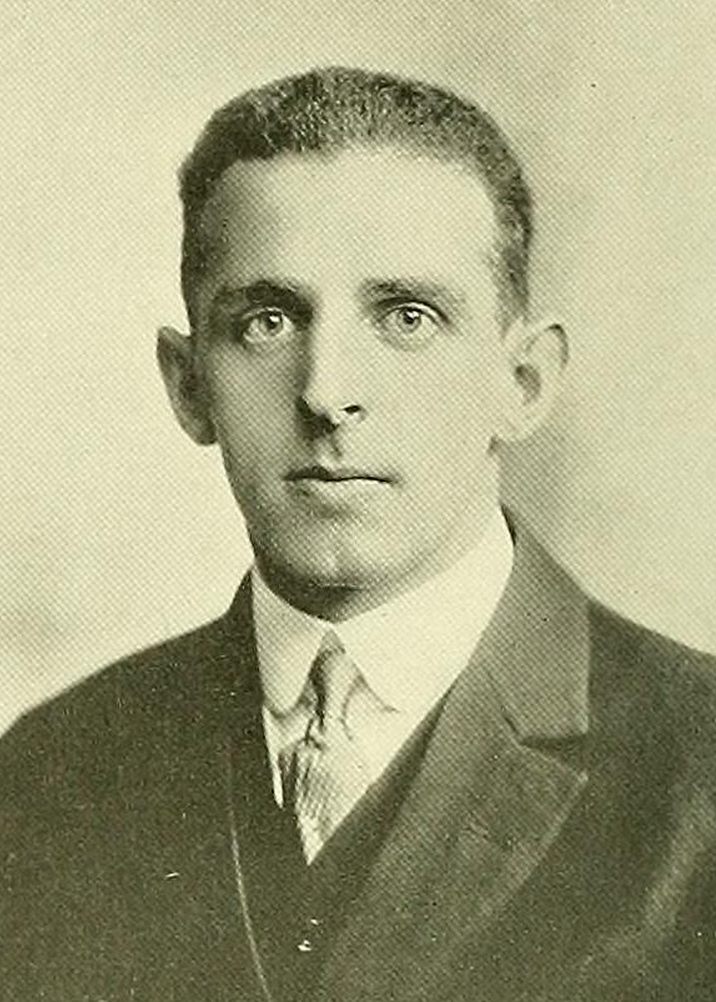
- Melican pictured in Index 1915, UMass yearbook

Biographical details
- Born: July 27, 1889; Worcester, Massachusetts, U.S.
- Education: Massachusetts (1915)

Playing career
- 1912–1914: Massachusetts
- Position: Quarterback

Coaching career (HC unless noted)
- 1916: Massachusetts

Head coaching record
- Overall: 2–4–2

George Deady Melican (born July 27, 1889) was an American football player and coach. He served as the head football coach at Massachusetts Agricultural College—now the University of Massachusetts Amherst in 1916. He compiled a 2–4–2 record that season.

== Biography ==
In 1914, Melican was captain of the Massachusetts Agricultural College's American football team. He served as head coach of the team in 1916.

== Head coaching record ==
Year	Team	Overall	Conference	Standing	Bowl/playoffs
Massachusetts Aggies (Independent) (1916)
1916	Massachusetts	2–4–2			
Massachusetts:		2–4–2			
Total:		2–4–2			
