= Matthew W. Bullock =

American civil servant, college football coach (1881–1972)

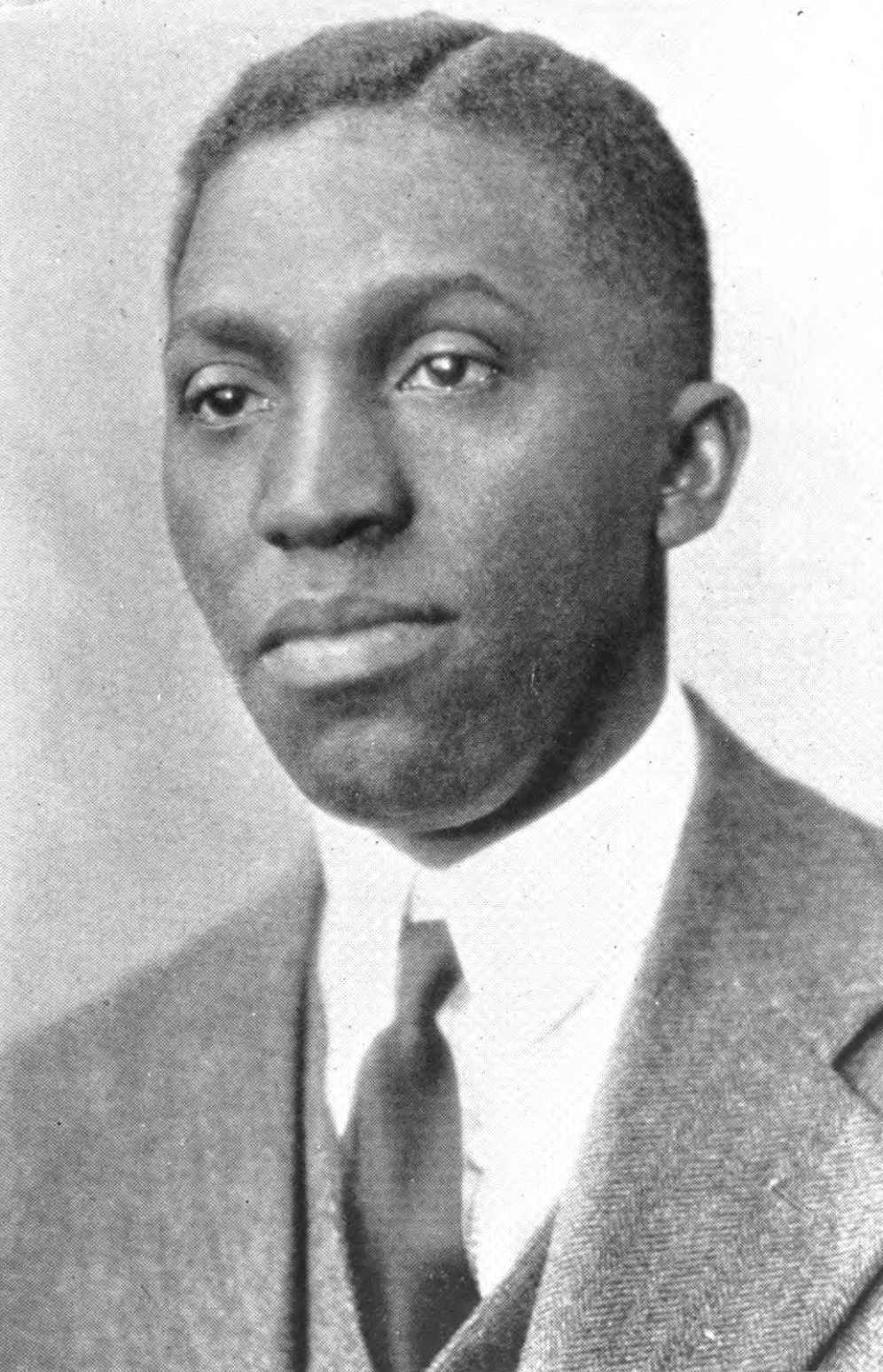
- Bullock c. 1927
- Born: September 11, 1881; Dabney, North Carolina, U.S
- Died: December 17, 1972 (aged 91); Detroit, Michigan, U.S
- Occupations: American football coach (1904–1908), lawyer (from 1912), college professor/dean (1908–1917), Boston Urban League (from 1919), assistant to the Massachusetts Attorney General (1924–1927), State Parole Board (1927–1937), State Department of Corrections (1937–1943) and regional board of the Massachusetts Bar Association (from 1937), State Parole Board (1943–1949) (chair from 1944), national board of the Urban League, (from 1945) National Spiritual Assembly of the Bahá'ís of the United States: 1952–1953; 1953–1954 (resigned 1953 to pioneer to Curaçao), and Zoning Commission Board (1965–1966)
- Spouse: Katherine Wright Bullock
- Children: 2

Matthew Washington Bullock (September 11, 1881 – December 17, 1972) was an American lawyer, politician and human rights activist.

== Biography ==
=== Childhood ===
Matthew Washington Bullock was born September 11, 1881, in Dabney, North Carolina. His parents, Jesse and Amanda (Sneed) Bullock were born enslaved. In 1889, the family moved to Boston "with seven children and a ten dollar bill.” Bullock attended public schools and in 1896, he graduated from Everett Center Grammar School. He then attended Everett High School, where he was the first African-American captain of the high school team as well as captaining the hockey("ice polo") and baseball teams. Bullock was recognized as among the best athletes of the school. His brother Henry was also a star athlete at Everett. Bullock was listed as a member of the Center School Alumni association of Fall 1899.

In June 1900, the US Census Records recorded that six children between the ages of 29 and 15 lived with Jesse and Joseph. Jesse and Joseph, the eldest, were day laborers although they have also been unemployed some months of the previous year. Jesse and Amanda were listed as illiterate while all children were listed as literate.

=== Dartmouth College ===
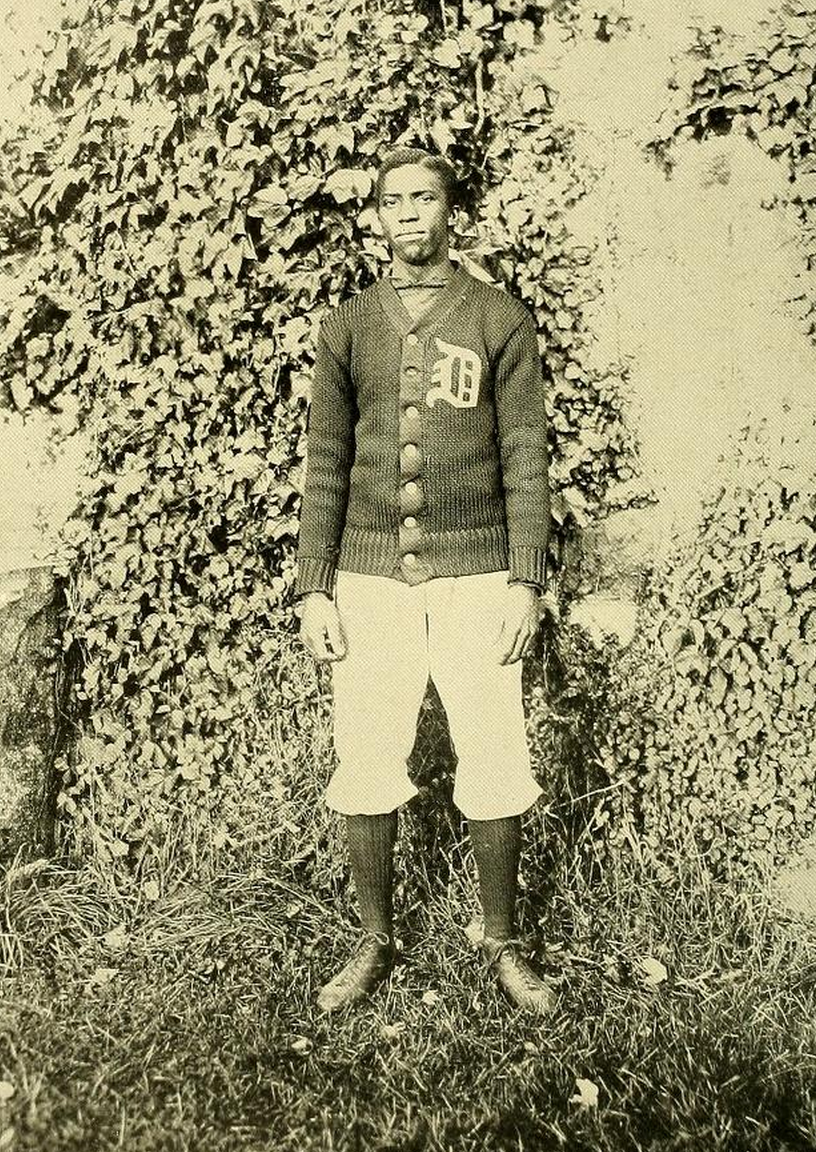
Bullock while coach at Massachusetts Agricultural and Mechanical School

Bullock was to start his time at Dartmouth College in 1901. His father sent him $50 for his tuition (equivalent to about $1,300 in 2021) and enrolled him at Dartmouth College. He had to start working to pay his tuitions. He enrolled at Dartmouth in the autumn and was elected to the Glee Club for his singing abilities, as well as serving on the track team for all four years. Bullock was the first African American to play football at Dartmouth, but he played a game his freshman year. He finished second in the high jump at an event that year.

The following year he started as a defensive end on the football team, and played well. In his Sophomore year he won first place in the broad jump and was successful in football. Bullock sang as a baritone soloist at a Vermont Church in April, 1903. He had greater success in his junior year, despite playing only the first six games.

In his senior year Bullock was on the varsity football team and achieved national recognition. He was part of the Dartmouth football team that defeated Harvard at the dedication event of the Dartmouth stadium in later 1903. A picture of Bullock was printed in a November issue of the Boston Post at the age of 22. A week later Bullock was refused accommodations during a game at Princeton University and also called out during the game; events that were covered in newspapers in various states across the nation. He broke a collarbone in the first play of this third game of the year in this Princeton game and it was widely believed he had been targeted. Dartmouth cut athletic ties with Princeton for several years. This was all during Woodrow Wilson's presidency at Princeton there and his investment in segregationally practices in the school. However Bullock was not named an All-American despite qualifying. His senior year he was also a member Palaeopity Senior Society as a distinguished individual, other by-invitation boards and committees, and was the associate editor of The Aegis.

Bullock graduated in 1904, with a Bachelor of Arts degree and scholastic and athletic distinctions, but only honorable mention in Walter Camp's All-American football listing for 1904. Sports commentator and NAACP leader Edwin Henderson in 1939 observed of Bullock's performance in 1901-3 "Why Bullock did not receive All-American selection has never been understood. Bullock was one of the brainiest men of football ability the game has ever had.” Indeed Bullock released his own list of All-American footballers in 1911.

Bullock then attended Harvard Law School 1904-1907 ultimately earning an LLB degree while James Barr Ames was Dean of the school. Along the way he paid is tuition by coaching football. He soon coached for the Massachusetts Agricultural and Mechanical College (now University of Massachusetts at Amherst) starting in the fall of 1904 and was credited with the comment "the outlook is the most encouraging in years" in the school newspaper. By that winter it said it "has been without doubt the most successful (season) in the history of the college” credited to Bullock after defeating 5 larger institutions and play in the championship bout and the team presented Bullock with an inscribed watch fob and charm. He was the first black football coach of an integrated college team and had a winning record, and was one of a handful of African-American football figures in the eastern white colleges. He then coached at Malden High School in 1905, as its first black football coach and was presented with a bonus for his improvement of the team in the year. They were undefeated early in 1906-7 school year.

Bullock finished at Harvard in the summer of 1907, with a Bachelor of Law degree studied at Cornell University, and returned to Agriculture & Mechanics College where he was set to coach more seasons. There was also a report he was heading out to Oklahoma to practice law. However by early 1909 he was in the South. That May his father died while the family was living on Winter Street.

=== Atlanta service ===
In 1908, Bullock accepted a position at Morehouse College (then Atlanta Baptist College) as athletic director and teacher.

In 1910, he was thanked in the preface of a book The Negro in Literature and Art by Benjamin Griffith Brawley. In September 1910, he married Katherine Wright in Boston. Katherine was born in Middlesboro, Kentucky, to Peter Wright and Julie Heatherlee. The Bullocks continued to live in Atlanta and by 1911 he had worked for three years in the Interscholastic Athletic Association's field games, and was faculty at the Atlanta Baptist College. His work in athletics was called an example of an HBCU "farm school" through which athletes could earn a place in white schools. Ultimately he taught Latin, History and Social Sciences serving for 4 years with distinction. He then worked as a lawyer in Atlanta from 1912 to 1915, including submitting an amendment to the school charter of 1913 to change the name of the college from the Atlanta Baptist College to Morehouse College. He was again thanked by Brawley for being one of the reviewers of his book A short history of the American Negro published in 1913.

Bullock then served two years, from 1915 to 1917, as dean of The State Agricultural and Mechanical College for Negroes—now known as Alabama A&M University—in Normal, Alabama. In 1916, he coached the football team at Lincoln University in Pennsylvania.

=== World War I and YMCA service ===
Bullock was registered with the Massachusetts State Bar in August 1917, and in February 1918 he was resident in Roxbury, a neighborhood in Boston, working as a lawyer.

He tried to volunteer to serve in a combat unit for World War I but was called "too old" to serve about age 36, and had a heart murmur, but worked via the YMCA's war effort, seeking to work in France and England. He was marked 6’1” tall on his passport application and his first witness was a clerk of the 1st Circuit Court of Boston. His mother was living with his family.

He was booked to leave from New York on the French SS Rochambeau on February 20 and appointed a secretary of the National War Council of the YMCA of the US to serve with American troops, however he served as a YMCA Educational Secretary at Fort George G. Meade, Maryland, first, initially as a breakfast guest of former law practice associate Charles Ford. He worked at Camp Meade to coach athletics, led singing, and taught French language. After 3 months he went to France with the 369th US Infantry (aka 15th NY Regiment) and served as a Physical Director for 15 months. He was one of eight such YMCA Secretaries. Bullock had a staff of four assistants one of which was a colored woman who was protested of in the military based on issues of southern-extraction army officials in Bordeaux. The situation caused an initial limit of participation of women to just three to act as nurses for 150,000 soldiers. He was an organizing personality in the Leave area in part because of his fame in sports but also his service with the women working in the circumstances.

Bullock and another of the YMCA designée followed the 369th all the way to the banks of the Rhine leading other units and accorded distinction because of the quality of its trenches. Bullock was singled out for noting his steadfast support of the soldiers during the worst of the battle. Bullock was called of "especially valiant service” noting he "could be seen at all times making his way under tremendous shell fire that he might reach his men with necessary supplies; … (and) in giving first aid to the wounded.” Bullock was recommended for the Croix de Guerre medal for leadership and bravery but it wasn't approved by the white colonel as described in the autobiography of John Hope. Hope had been stationed in Paris. Rev. Benjamin Robeson wrote about the issue in a letter to the New York Age. Robeson begins "It is not long ago that all New York anxiously, confidently bade adieu to this history-making regiment. Believing them capable, knowing them to be fearless, depending upon them to brighten the memory of their fathers, you watched, waited, and listened.…"

I wish to speak of one who still plods the path of duty with an infectious smile, happy and patient because he knows time will dip her pen in the ink of justice and rightly reward him.

I refer to Secretary Bullock (we call him Matt) who wears the badge of the faithful and walks with the step of the worthy.… Just before that memorial drive of September 25 … Bullock went to Chalons, faced the authorities, and said: 'I have nothing to give my men and they storm the heights tomorrow. I must have something or I cannot go back.' (eventually received his requests and) the campaign was on.

Every morning as the cannon were belching, men falling and bullets whizzing, over the hill came a human form. On his back were strapped (supplies…) On he came, now and then dropping for shelter.… Men wondered why he came into that region of death. When twilight wrapped the hills in its shadows, back came the same form empty handed; weary, but game. His coming and going stopped when there was no regiment to serve.

He wears no Croix de Guerre upon his breast, but within his breast throbs the spirit of devotion - devotion to God, country and race. The multitudes will see no D. S. C. to testify to his courage in that hour, but listen to the reflective melody sung by the boys of the old Fifteenth and you will hear of a faithfulness and service approaching that of the lowly Nazarene. No Legion of Honor will proclaim his rank with the worthy, but as long as one member of this grand old regiment breathes the breath of life the name of Matthew W. Bullock will be heard and its worth will be sung.

Let us all honor the uncrowned here.

He had served in the Champagne and Alsace fronts of later 1917 through May 1918, and was recommended for the Croix de Guerre for the September–October battle.

Bullock arrived at Ellis Island two months later from Brest, France, on the USS Mobile noting his home residence at Sarsfield Street, Roxbury. He retired from war service June 4, 1919, and by then German was added to his language skills. He was then a member of Baptist Church, and had been paid over $1200, ($18k in 2021 dollars,) for his service.

Years later he recalled the bitter disappointment of the relatively integrated service in the military and returning home to a more deeply segregated society.

He spoke at the convention of the Northeastern Federation of Colored Women's Clubs of Maine held in Washington, D.C., speaking of the military service of soldiers in France.

=== Boston service in the African American Community ===
Bullock cofounded the Boston chapter of the National Urban League in 1919 and was appointed its first executive officer in January 1920. which he served as into 1921, and gained a reputation of "an unusually high humanitarian idealism”. Later, in the words of Helen Elsie Austin, it was noted as the start of a career of public services of "more than twenty years, constantly pioneering for social justice and human dignity."

The January 1920 US Census had the couple married renting a home on Sarsfield Street and he was employed as a lawyer. Bullock was also credited with founding a branch of the YMCA to serve the South End-Roxbury black community which ran 1920-1922, and then was closed to preserve a non-segregated program with the main branch. In March Bullock was recognized in the Harvard Alumni Bulletin as the Secretary of the Boston Urban League, noted his service in France during WWI but thought that he had indeed received the Croix de Guerre from the French government, Son Matthew Jr. was born April 4, 1920, and a couple weeks later Bullock gave a talk on the history of the Urban League to a Boston Club, and spoke at St. Bartholomew's Church in late May. He filed to run for office in state government in July, was on the ballot with Andrew Lattimore, and had spent alittle over $17 on the registering for the election. He was also on the list of those available for the position of assistant director for the Department of Corporations and Taxation with the state. In October he addressed the Ellot Club as a member of the Boston Urban League on “What does the Negro Want? The Answer" while running for office. Bullock and Lattimore campaigned across Ward 13. Meanwhile his wife was visible at a fundraiser for Atlanta University. In November Bullock got more votes than Lattimer for the Republicans but both lost against the Democratic ticket. The two claimed they had been voted against for being black and the case had thought to be in contest because of increased Republican women registering to vote. Then governor John Jackson Walsh spoke out against the race issue prejudice in voting. Bullock and Lattimer advanced a recall petition against the Democrats in January 1921. In February Bullock returned to Everett to talk for the Board of Trade about “The Negro, a great asset” and the article covering his talk recalled his 1896-1900 service at the Everett High School, then on to athletic success and now lawyer. A few days later Bullock and Lattimer testified about their challenge to the election and offered biographical summaries of their lives. Bullock detailed that he graduated from Everett High School, Dartmouth College, Harvard Law School and had a post-graduate class at Cornell. He tried to serve during WWI but was rejected "because of an 'athlete's heart'" as he put it but worked at a YMCA secretary overseas. Their petition had a hearing for the House Committee on Elections claiming illegal means had been used to complete the election. Depositions were taken of witnesses after a significant delay. The majority of the committee did not support the petition though at least one member did. Bullock and Lattimer escalated with the state Speaker of the House seeking a chance to address the whole House. The progress of the petition had cost $225 in legal fees, (near three thousand dollars in 2021 dollars.)

Generally from 1921 to 1924 Bullock worked as an attorney. This may be when he worked with the Cardozo and Tucker firm. In June Bullock spoke at the Everett High School graduation ceremony as a graduate of the 1900 class. In July at the request of a committee of the Urban League Bullock was asked to be a district chair for the city of Boston and it was said of him that "The feature of the work in his district was the fine co-operation he received from the ministers and all social welfare organizations." He also served with the [Knights of Pythias of North America, South America, Europe, Asia, Africa and Australia, a fraternal service society and source of a life insurance company in another decade, on their Committee Credentials for those seeking election in the organization. The Bullock's daughter Julia Amanda was born September 3, 1921. Bullock voiced his support for a candidate for Mayor in December. Around this time there was another Matthew Bullock involved in North Carolina and Canada including threats from the KKK and a lynching c. 1921–1922. The two Bullocks were occasionally confused as in a funeral biography of Bullock in 1972. Meanwhile Bullock again challenged the Democrat for the state representative position. In August he was on the primary for the Republican position, and spoke for a bank formation in Roxbury, for Suffolk County. Before the voting in November, in October Bullock submitted a bill to the state House of Representatives as a public citizen to prohibit the Ku Klux Klan from forming an organization in the state because it was a "menace to the public peace”; the presentation drew widespread national attention. Meanwhile the governor appointed special supervisors for the Ward 13 election. The election was held and Jessie Emery won.

In February 1923 hearings on the anti-Klan bill began. At Bullock's own testimony for the bill he said that a grandfather of his had been murdered by Klansmen and he urged passage of the bill as a private citizen. He mentioned this incident again in 1966 saying that his mother's mother had found the body of his grandfather in an abandoned well. Bullock addressed a conference of the Knights of Pythias at their May 1923 meeting. He then joined in the mass organization across Massachusetts called for by then Governor Channing H. Cox on the relief effort for the Great Kanto Earthquake of September 1 in Japan through the Red Cross.

=== Assistant State Attorney General ===
The Massachusetts Attorney General Jay R. Benton appointed Bullock as one of two special assistants in July 1924, first focusing on the legal issues of the new construction of the northern traffic highway from Boston to Wellington Bridge in Somerville. Today this is a segment of Interstate 93. The biographical article about him in the new position noted much of his familiar career in public service ending that he was the executive secretary of the Boston Urban League association and practiced law with Charles Williams, clerk of the Boston Juvenile Court. This appointment made some news in other places too.

Bullock was added to the committee of the Republican party of Massachusetts and addressed them about the Klan issue on its platform. It was the last plank considered in an otherwise quiet session. Bullock spoke at another Republican party meeting in later October. In November Bullock presided at a meeting of political speakers held at People's Baptist Church.

In February 1925 Bullock attended the Everett High school reception for colored athletes. In September Bullock represented a community effort opposing a cleaning and dyeing business trying to set up shop because of its environmental effects. In November Bullock was a charter member co-founding the Boston chapter of Omega Psi Phi fraternity. He then spoke at an Omega Psi Phi meeting at Tuskegee highlighting the progress the African Americans had made.

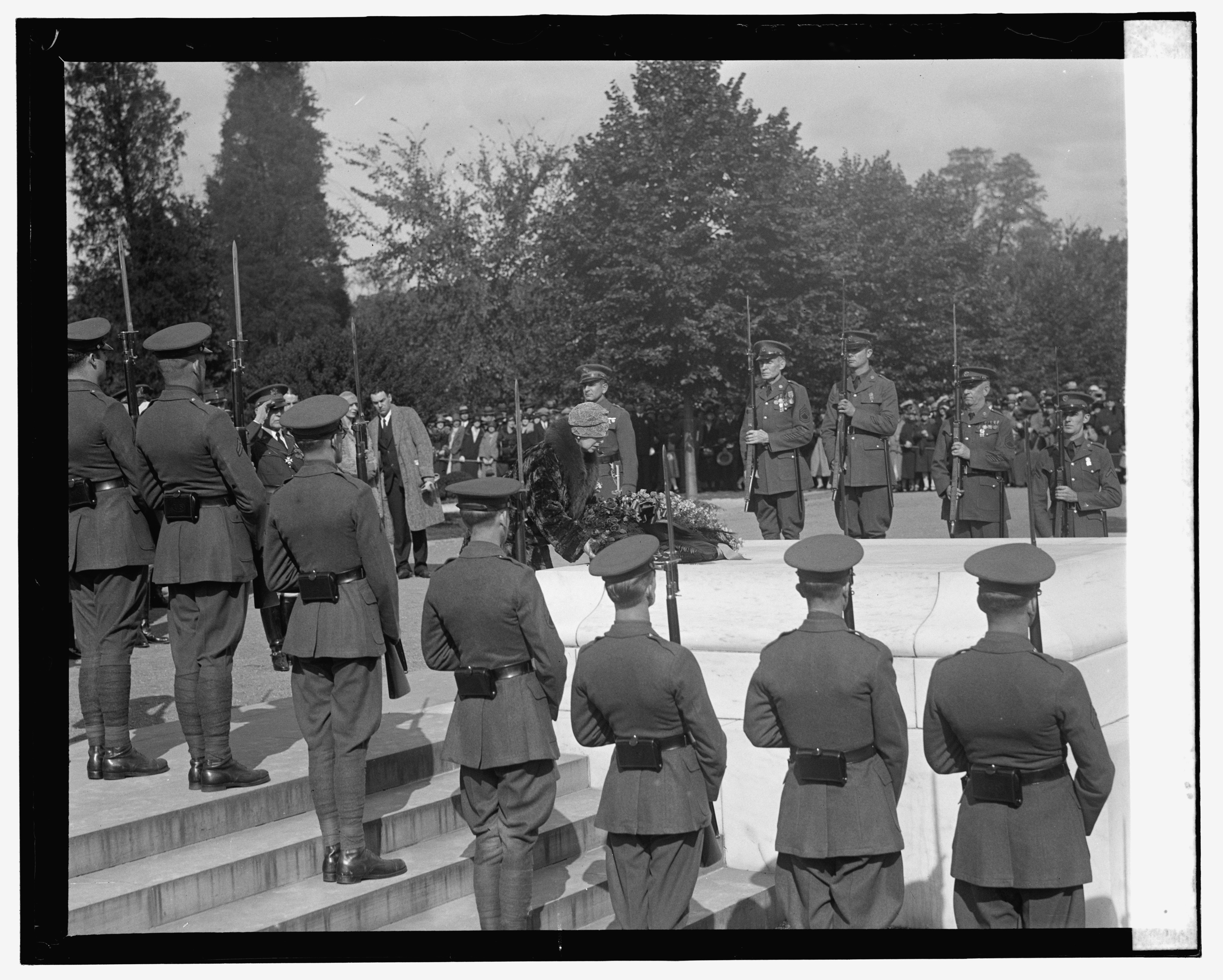
Queen Marie at Tomb of the Unknown Soldier, October 19, 1926

In January 1926 Bullock spoke for a program arranged by the NAACP at Union Congregational Church in New York city. Bullock again protested the impact of a company on a neighborhood at a city council meeting in March. He also attended the dedication of the Tomb of the Unknown Soldier in Arlington National Cemetery. This may have been at the 1926 dedication. In October Bullock addressed the National Equal Rights League on the situation of segregation.

In February 1927 Bullock spoke to a Knights of Pythias regional conference.

=== State Parole Board ===
Bullock was called "among the best trained and most successful lawyers of the Negro race at the present time…” in 1927. He then started serving on the Massachusetts State Parole Board which extended for nine years, then was re-appointed in 1943, and then named chair in 1944, at which point he was the first African-American head of a department of state government.

It began in March when Bullock was named to the State Parole Board by then Governor Avlan T. Fuller. This too made news. It was thought in coverage at the time he was born in Morganton, North Carolina (Dabney is north of Raleigh vs Morgontown in the far west) and recalled his Dartmouth football career and graduating in 1904. While that coverage continued to echo over a month, Bullock gave a talk at the Unitarian Universalist Church on “A challenge to Christianity”. In July Bullock addressed a regional conference of the Knights of Pythias on the economic plight of the blacks and the issue of mob violence.

Bullock was re-appointed to the State Parole Board in January 1928. That month Bullock also was named as a court advocate on the staff of the Greater Boston Police Post VFW. In February Bullock wrote a letter that was read into the Federal Congressional Record to support the establishment of a Memorial to African Americans for the country. A couple weeks later Bullock returned for a talk for the Knights of Pythias. In September the Bullocks hosted the Omega Psi College fraternity at their home on Windsor Street. In the fall Bullock was on the schedule of the Second Congregational Church's speakers list, described as the former secretary of the Urban League.

In January 1929 Bullock was recognized as chair of the Republican party for Ward 9. In June he addressed the United Negro Welfare Council on the conditions of the northeast, listed as one of those assistants to the Attorney General, though it is more correct to say he was now a member of the Parole Board. With the Parole Board membership came questions and reports in the media about plea cases. In July one of Bullock's first comments was agreeing in a case that someone had committed murder in a unanimous rejection of innocence by the Board. Another newspaper report in July mentioned the Board heard testimony about a case who's perpetrator had gained some support from prison personnel. Bullock was among the speakers at the dedication of a new community center in Cambridge made out of the old school in August, and that month Bullock's salary as an associate Board member was raised from $2000 to $2250/yr and could have increased higher, (about $34000 in 2021 dollars.) In September Bullock attended a Better Homes Association prize meeting about a neighborhood success story saving vacant lots. In October Bullock was among many appointed to a commission to advance raising a national memorial as a tribute to the contributions of African Americans in the history of the country. In November Bullock was one of many that endorsed Frederick Mansfield.

Bullock was called the party leader of Ward 9 and State Parole Board Commissioner when he was going to attend the Omega Psi Phi Fraternity meeting in Baltimore in January 1930, with the beginning of the Great Depression in the United States. Bullock was one of the speakers at a Women's Republican Club meeting in March. That month Bullock publicly criticized President Hoover for segregating travels to Europe and observed that the women had been more true to Lincoln and Sumner's influence on the Republican party. The next day Bullock attended a Portsmouth, New Hampshire, Baptist Church where he gave a talk/eulogy for the local lodge of the Knights of Pythias. The April 1930 US Census has attorney Matthew with wife Katherine and children both born in Massachusetts, Matthew Bullock Jr (9 years old), and Julie(8 years old,) owning a home worth an estimated $5500 ($86k in 2021 dollars.) The Knights of Pythias met again in July at another Baptist Church in Providence, Rhode Island, and there Bullock was among the association's "Pythian Temple Commission”. A couple weeks later the Parole Board had newspaper coverage when it heard the plea about a convict that had escaped jail and voluntarily returned. In August the Parole Board heard a plea from a man convicted of arson and insurance fraud who claimed he was innocent. In September a tableaux drama was held with Bullock as the voice announcer reviewing the role of African Americans in the Civil War. The same month Bullock was appointed to a resolutions committee for the Republican party perhaps for his "dry" political views on alcohol drinks supporting prohibition against that of others who had “wet” views which again made some news. In October Bullock was part of a Republican party set of rallies meeting at Springfield's Central High School, for William Butler. In November Bullock was nominated on re-appointment on the Parole Board. In December the Parole Board heard the pardon appeal for a murderer of a policeman - there was support for and against the shooter saying he was innocent.

In March 1931, the Great Depression deeply affecting America, Bullock spoke at an Omega Psi Phi Fraternity at a memorial of Col. Charles Young at a Congregational Church in New York. In April the Parole Board submitted its suggestions for paroles amounting to 200 out of 433 hearings of the 4343 cases presented to the Board while noting that some cases were not suited to the Board as the right tool for interventions. In September the Parole Board heard a pardon petition for the assaulter of two girls when the girls testified their earlier testimony was untrue. In October Bullock lead the evening session celebrating of the Robert Gould Shaw House, a community center in the black community. In December the Parole Board heard a petition plea which was a fraud case of a man some thought was likable.

Bullock was scheduled to talk to the Cambridge Civic Club February 3, 1932. In March the Parole Board heard the parole plea for a case of abuse of a 16 year old girl, who, now 20 years old, plead for the case on a promise to her father on his death bed, and that month Bullock complained of women having gotten the right to vote without a sense of political party loyalty, though this complaint was in the context of a disenfranchisement of the black community in Boston following 1895's redistricting. In May Bullock was elected president of the Pan-Hellenic Council which is the national association of several fraternities. Charles Ponzi, the originator of the Ponzi scheme, plead a case for parole before the Board on technicalities. This year the Board's annual summary referred to their job being "increasingly difficult owing to the steady stream of pressure brought to bear upon it by relatives and influential friends” and having to defend itself against those who argue they are too lenient or too severe and “unfavorable newspaper coverage” with issues of re-employment, and alcoholic recidivism. They noted a 1.1% revocations of paroles were of felons and was about the same as previous years. They had 4351 cases considered and 3192 granted and 1086 revoked with drunkenness accounting for most of the revocations. Bullock's place on the Parole Board was again up for re-appointment in late 1932.

In February 1933 Bullock supported a bill prohibiting car insurance discrimination for clients based on race, color, religion, or place of living in light of the requirement of insurance. He specifically addressed the State House Committee on Insurance about it. The same month the Parole Board held meetings at Norfolk State Prison noting cases of larceny and others.

=== Community Church ===
Continuing his service on the State Parole Board, Bullock began a relationship of service with the Boston Community Church. He first appears speaking there on "Is the negro being driven into Communism?" in February. The talk was summarized. He noted that though there was a culture of the community, younger people had left the Republican Party and joined the Democratic Party seeking aide and even became socialists or communists and was concerned that if the situation of the blacks in the country was not advanced to equality the youth would become communists. In May he spoke at a Lexington church at the Young People's Fellowship meeting. Bullock missed a meeting of the Board in early June though it is unknown why. The Bullocks were among the patrons of the Cambridge Community Center in September. Bullock's birthday was also noted in Pasadena, California, that year. A case of a murderer of a husband was brought to the Board in September. The Dartmouth football team of 1903 including Bullock, pictured in the newspaper, was remembered for its victory over Harvard at the new stadium in October. Bullock addressed the Mount Vernon Congregational Church Young People's Society in December, during a toy donation gathering meant for children in a particular church in North Carolina and Christmas Supper of the community on topic of "Giving him a second chance". Bullock then addressed the Community Church at its Christmas Service on "Can races, creeds and classes live together in Peace" noting he was the Director of the Community Church and having invited a Rabbi and a leader of the Massachusetts Federation of Labor as additional speakers, with music by the Greater Boston Negro Chorus. Bullock's comments spoke of the race problem tracing back to the roots of civilization and unfolding in various ways around the world, and that in America we could do better than segregation, limited access to courts, voting suppression and picking up on the problems in Germany being imported ideologically into America, and the stirring of the Ku Klux Klan.

February 1934 opens mention of Bullock giving another talk at the Community Church held with a meeting of the church leadership. The Parole Board heard the case of a murderer who was mentally compromised. In March Bullock contributed to a fundraiser for the Coast Guard, and April he was one of the speakers at the Robert Gould Shaw House for a mass meeting on community issues, followed a week later when the Parole Board heard of Portuguese citizen who had killed a policeman. In May Bullock spoke at a Rhode Island Republican gathering, and then in June Bullock resigned from the State Republican Party committee. In July Bullock was up for reappointment to the Parole Board. was repointed, and in October and November it heard two cases of murderers. In November Bullock spoke of male culture at the morning Men's Day service at the African American Shiloh Baptist Church. In December Bullock was invited to a hotel to visit a representative at a National Crime Conference, denied access at first because he was black, and this made the news widely. A week later the Parole Board hear a case of an escaped prisoner.

In January 1935 Bullock proposed a change to the parole law for automatic paroles to be reviewed, and the case of the Bullock part of the election contest of 1921 was recalled via second-hand comments. In February Bullock spoke at the Community Church anniversary. He was among many that contributed to a general emergency fundraiser as well, before speaking at a Race Relations Institute in the evening service at Park Avenue Congregational Church. In April Bullock attended the graduation ceremonies of the Bigelow Evening School in South Boston, and in May was again elected as president of the Community Church then located at 6 Byron Street.

Though the year isn't known, it is known Bullock attended a dinner reception for Ludmila Bechtold by the Bahá'ís, as she was known then, and they struck up friendship - this happened while Bullock was president of the Community Church which could be here in the mid-1930s. After an initial exchange of questions Bechtold encouraged him to read the book of the religion, Some Answered Questions, and he and Mrs. Bullock visited Green Acre Bahá'í School, (Green Acre), possibly for one of the annual Race Amity Convention meetings. It is known that about 1929 Bahá'í Doris McKay had met him briefly with a letter of introduction from James Hubert, Secretary of the Harlem chapter of the National Urban League, but that his reception was cool to her meeting him.

In September Bullock, as president of the Community Church, presided over the second annual conference of church workers supporting social action. The Parole Board also heard another murderer's case for parole. In October Bullock oversaw meetings at the Community Church as president and at other churches. One meeting became controversial as Communists stormed a meeting and took it over by strength of numbers. In November the Parole Board heard another case of a murderer. In December Bullock joined in the Board statement of not hearing the appeals of "persistent and habitual criminals” after a prison riot among many who were not eligible for parole. On the other hand an arsonist was paroled on wide recommendation save by clerics. Bullock was photographed during testimony of the Parole Board to the Governor's Council on the need of the existence of the Parole Board which it was considering ending it, though the Council did pass a recommended change in the law of sentencing. The concern was over strictness of the parole board being a reason for the recent prison riot. The situation was largely dismissed by late January 1936 among factioning of Democrats.

Mrs. Bullock attended a fundraiser concert given by Marian Anderson for the Cambridge Community Center in February. The Community Church meetings continued with Bullock as president. In early 1936 Bullock declined to serve on Board of the Boston NAACP chapter. In March Bullock was among area church leaders addressing a youth conference of the Youth Council of the Greater Boston Federation of Churches on "Christianity and Racial barriers”. About a week later Bullock spoke on the problem of race to the Wesley Foundation of Cambridge. It is known that well known African American Bahá'í Louis Gregory gave talks in Boston in October and November. Meanwhile Bullock's annual term on the Parole Board was ending in December and the new governorship of the Democrat James Michael Curley and was part of widely advertised listings in the state. There were debates about whom to fill the position of by Democrats. His replacement was named at the end of December, which situation was still making news in April and May.

Bullock had held the position since 1927 and most of the way through the Great Depression, until the change in political parties controlling the offices.

While all that was changing, Bullock was named a member of the board of the Boston Center for Adult Education in January, 1937. The Bullocks were then also among those attending the reception for Maude Royden of London. In February Bullock spoke in support of Clarence Skinner, and was named to a committee to investigate ways to advance reemployment of the blacks of the state (after the Great Depression). In March Bullock was named to the replacement on the State Department of Corrections while still living in Roxbury with his family. That evening Bullock was announced to attend recognition ceremony set for mid-April in Cambridge. A week later he spoke at the Wesley Foundation evening meeting at the Epworth Methodist Episcopal Church. In May Bullock was again at the Boston Youth Conference, and in June he was again named a member of the Board for the Adult Education Center. In October Mrs. Bullock attended a Community Church Tea for the Women's International League. Then Bullock was named vice president of the Community Church and scheduled to give a talk at the North Cambridge Community Church. Meanwhile Bullock spoke publicly of his boss’ new plans on a budget for the Department of Corrections and was named leading the division on segregating hardened criminals away from others. In November Bullock was named first vice president of the Boston Urban League, and attended an Omega Psi Phi reception listed as a leader of the Community Church. That winter Bullock was named regional director of the National Bar Association.

In January 1938 Bullock was among speakers at an Athletic Night event in Cambridge. In February Bullock spoke on the issue of race in America at the evening meeting of the Cambridge Baptist Church Sunday Evening Club. In April Bullock spoke at Baptist rally in Malden, and attended the funeral of Parole Board co-worker. In May he was listed as vice president of Community Church as one of speakers at an exhibit on un-American propaganda. The rest of the year went by after that without mention of Bullock noted in the newspapers yet found.

In February 1939 Bullock chaired an inter-church goodwill dinner. His son also won a scholarship attending college in Maine that month. In March a list of members of the Urban League, NAACP, and others, included Bullock for passage of house bill to end discrimination in public utilities. Bullock was named a member of a 100-count committee for an Edvard Beneš lecture in town after his fleeing Nazi Germany occupation the previous year. In May the Bullocks attended a prominent social affair at an exclusive club. Sometime during the year Bullock served on the Board of the Boston NAACP, and also helped register a forming association of black women beauticians with the state. In June the Bullocks' son was noted at Bowdoin College in Maine. In August Bullock was named a counselor of the board of the Samuel Coleridge Taylor Music Association for its 20th anniversary.

January 1940 Bullock was invited to the Cambridge Community Center celebration of sports with leading political figures. A few days later the Community Church held a presentation on the history of the church noting the congregation had elected a black president for his qualities and diversity but didn't name him or list him as a member. A few days later Bullock spoke at the Groton federation of clubs for members of area clubs. In February Bullock was among leaders present for a Conference of Civil Liberties. In March news came of Bullock's son on graduating from Bowdoin college and speaker at commencement; he was summa cum laude.

=== Joined the Bahá'í Faith ===
The April 1940 US Census has the Bullock family living and owning a home on Monroe Street worth about $3000 (about $56000 in 2021 dollars.) He had finished a 4 year college degree while their son was in his 3rd year of college and their daughter was in her 2nd year. They were living in the same place as in April 1935. He was then an Assistant Commissioner of the Department of Correction earning $4375 the previous year, (about $82k in 2021 dollars.)

Bullock later called Bechtold his "spiritual mother" when he accepted the Bahá'í Faith in 1940. The only written record of Bullock's choice, mentioned in 1966, says that the distinction that the religion did not have clergy was important to him. Bullock's membership in political and other religious organizations had undergone changes already, he had already resigned active political party status in 1934, a standard that was in the process of being promulgated among Bahá'ís as well. In 1939-1940 there were 3 assemblies, the local administrative organization of communities of Bahá'ís, in the state - Boston, Springfield and Worcester - plus three communities with registered groups of Bahá'ís between 2 and 9 adults, and five isolated Bahá'ís (amounting to about 47 Baha'is in the state.) By 1943-4 Boston was one of 37 assemblies in the US to incorporate and the only one in Massachusetts. There were five assemblies in Massachusetts 1943-4: Beverly, Brookline, Boston, Springfield, and Worcester, 22 registered groups, and 18 locations with a single alone Bahá'ís including Everett amounting to roughly an estimated 150 Bahá'ís in the state and there were about 2500-4000 Bahá'ís in the entire country.

The Bullocks next appear in October 1940 among patrons of reception for Roland Hall Sharp speech, a staff correspondent of the Christian Science Monitor who had been reporting on Fascism in South America. In November Katherine was visible aiding the Women's International League Thanksgiving fundraiser. In December Bullock was a nominee for vice-president of the Massachusetts Law Society.

In February 1941 Bullock gave a talk at the Everett First Congregational Church, and offered another talk as part of the reception for North Carolina Palmer Memorial Institute chair Charlotte Brown. In May Bullocks was master of ceremonies at a memorial for Edward Dugger. It was known Bullock was in New York mid-June, though not what he was doing. In August he was among remembered black sports stars, while he himself was among the August principle speakers at the Green Acre Bahá'í School for the annual Race Amity Convention, along with Louis Gregory, NAACP leader and The Crisis editor Roy Wilkins, and Dorothy Beecher Baker. In December he gave a talk to youth at the Copley Church in Boston during Advent season, and at a Methodist Church, on the heels of the news of the Attack on Pearl Harbor.

In mid-January, 1942, Bullock joined in a fundraiser for the Adult Education Center. In May he was next visible giving a talk “Negro and the current Crisis” at the Greater Boston Adult Education Center's luncheon. In August Bullock, listed as a vice-president of the Boston Urban League, was the leading co-signer of a letter published in the Boston Globe supporting the program for the Boston Soldiers and Sailors Committee recreational program for the city. Bullock was also a member of the National Committee of the Urban League in 1942-3. Meanwhile Bullock chaired the Sunday program of the Race Amity Conference at Green Acre in early August reading selections from 'Abdu'l-Bahá's talks, from 1912, and on some points on African American history, and of how he was honored to be at the gathering sharing that he had read on the Bahá'í teachings for some years. Other presenters included African-American and Bostonian Bahá'í Mabry Oglesby, Ludmila Bechtold, Horace Holley, and Dorothy Beecher Baker. In October Bullock was among the Massachusetts Law Society in procession for the Red Mass. Later in the month it was announced that Bullock would serve on a state commission reviewing barriers to employment of blacks that reported to Governor Leverett Saltonstall, listed as member of State Department of Corrections. That December Bullock was also listed as an officer of the Massachusetts Law Society.

In January 1943, Bullock gave a talk on race relations at a Methodist church. In April Bullock was again nominated to the State Parole Board. The biographical article recalled he was vice-president of the Boston Urban League, a member of the USO Soldiers' and Sailors' Committee, vice-president of the Law Society of Massachusetts, past president of the Community Church, member of the Board of the Boston Center for Adult Education, a graduate of Everett Schools, Dartmouth, Harvard Law School, had taught in the South, tried to serve in WWI but barred for "athlete's heart" and instead worked with YMCA War program, his service as assistant to the Attorney General Jay Benton, Parole Board member nominated by Gov. Fuller, appointed to the Department of Correction in 1937 and that his son was a Bowdoin honors graduate and now serving as a private at Fort Devens while his daughter was a librarian at the Virginia Hampton Institute, as it was called then. His nomination was confirmed, and his salary was $4500 a year, (about $68000 in 2021 dollars.) In May Bullock spoke to a youth group at the Unitarian church in Exeter New Hampshire on "The Race Problem and Democracy". In June he was remembered on a black Harvard graduates list that also noted Leslie Pinckney Hill but missed mention of Alain Locke. In August Bullock co-taught a class with Bechtold on the Advent of Divine Justice at the summer Green Acre session that year. In September Bullock was the object of another biographical article as a State Parole Commissioner, varsity football coach, and his success at Dartmouth. In October he was again listed as a vice-president of the Law Society of Massachusetts. Their son married in New York in November, and Bullock was a co-speaker at an A.M.E. church service in Roxbury. Bullock's position on the Parole Board was up for renewal in June 1944. The year closed out with mention of Bullock on the executive committee for resolving USO integration policy issues when a USO club refused to integrate, and was among speakers for a Baptist hosted reception for William H. Hastie.

In February 1944 Bullock attended the USO Rec. Center reception at the Buddies Club, and was among the many Bar Association members who spoke at a luncheon for Judge F. Ellis Rivers. Bullock was indeed re-nominated to Parole Board in June. In August Bullock gave a talk "Forward March of Humanity" with Bahá'í Terah Cowart Smith then of Atlanta amidst the next Race Amity Convention held at Green Acre. He spoke of his experience in WWI seeking justice and fairness and being sore disappointed and social problems had only increased but how he had great joy having encountered the Bahá'í Faith. When he returned home Bullock presided over a Race Unity meeting in Boston in November hosted by the Bahá'ís at which one speaker was Harlan Ober. In November Bullock was nominated for Chair of the Parole Board. It was pointed out in a local newspaper it was the highest office in state government by an appointed person of color when he was named Chair of the Parole Board. That December Bullock was a member of the Bahá'í State Convention Committee for Massachusetts to elect its delegate to the next National Bahá'í Convention. He also gave a talk in Springfield with the mention of the importance of accepting "the immutable fact that humanity is one" and racism as America's "most challenging issue", a phrase Shoghi Effendi as then head of the religion had introduced in 1938 in The Advent of Divine Justice. Bullock also served as chair of the Spiritual Assembly of the Bahá'ís of Boston during some unknown years since 1940.

In January 1945 Bullock gave a talk in Ipswich entitled "The Negro and his place in Democracy Today”. He was also visible among a group supporting a sentencing tribunal study. In February Bullock gave a talk at a Community Church fundraiser, and was also elected to the National Board of the Urban League. It was also announced that Bullock was named to a Massachusetts committee for application of the Fair Employment Practice Act. In March Bullock signed recommendations to curb/regulate alcohol sales "with reservations", (the law regulated but opened further drinking.) In June Bullock was among sponsors of the New England Institute of International Relations at the Fletcher School of Law and Diplomacy at Tufts College. Bullock's wife Katherine died August 10. His children long since moved on with lives of their own, and now alone, a month later he off on Pacific survey for then Secretary of the Navy James Forrestal, as one among several touring about progress in race conditions in the military, with Harry McAlpin. Bullock was back in Boston for a reception in honor of Julius E. Warren mid-late November. Perhaps in December, the Boston Bahá'í meeting on World peace was chaired by Bullock. Bullock, speaking as Chair of Parole Board, defended decisions of the Board from Rev. Robinson comments by detailing the background of the convict who had complained to Robinson. In February Bullock spoke for the Parole Board on women camp followers of military areas, and on further decisions in March, and then in July. Amidst these Bullock was also with the Albany Interracial Council meeting in April, and on radio WBZ on May 23 as part of a program of many on the show. Bullock served under the chairship of Louis Gregory on the 1946-7 Bahá'í National Assembly's Race Unity Committee while they planned three projects for the year - a large seminar on the theme of race amity, participate in other large conferences addressing problems of prejudice and create a pamphlet on the issue and the religion. In August Bullock was a speaker at a New England Conference on probation. In early November Bullock was a speaker at a meeting for the Bahá'ís and this year was scheduled for a talk for the Bahá'í community observance of the Birth of Bahá'u'lláh in Binghamton. Newspapers as well as radio WNBF coverage occurred there with 175 people attending, only 40 of which were Bahá'ís. About a week later Bullock was public standing by a decision of the Parole Board on a case, and then spoke on Parole Board policy opposed to the demands of a sit down prison strike. In December news coverage occurred that Bullock had been attacked during a parolee's interview which was echoed regionally.

In January 1947 Bullock endorsed a scholarship program of some prisons for screened inmates to take school classes. Then Bullock was quoted on Parole Board statements about prisons and sentences and the need for psychiatric reviews of prisoners. In February Bullock attended a reception, and was also named as part of a national committee for the Association for the Study of African American Life and History for a membership drive during what was then Negro History Week. The month closed with news of the birth of a granddaughter born to Bullock. In March Bullock commented in the news on Parole Board business about pressures to release prisoners. That month the Bullock's son was admitted to Bar Association of Massachusetts. The April–May 1947 Bahá'í national convention noted an anecdote of youth walking together as an interracial group in Los Angeles being stopped and harassed by police and Bullock was a delegate from Massachusetts that year. He spoke up that “walking together is not indiscrete” in the face of the comments at the convention that proposed caution and not opposing society's standards and earning the attention of police. In June there was a Bahá'í advertisement for a talk by Bullock at the community's Center. A couple weeks later Bullock spoke on "Consciousness of World Citizenship” at the 35th "Souvenir" Bahá'í meeting in Teaneck, New Jersey, commemorating 'Abdu’l-Bahá’s talk in 1912. In July it was mentioned that Bullock was a member of the Spiritual Assembly of the Bahá'ís of Boston and had just been promoted to National Probation Association Board. In October Bullock spoke on crime before the prison conference held by the Republican Women's Club of Lexington. Bullock called for reform in the prison system especially about mixing minors and hardened criminals. In November coverage began of the Noxon pardon petition which carried on for 2 plus years - a lawyer who had killed a son born with medical complications compromising mental development.

In January 1948 Bullock appeared on WNAC-TV speaking on Parole Board policies. A few days later there was news that Bullock was on a committee for fundraising for a New York based study centered on medical needs of African-Americans in Harlem. In February Bullock spoke as chair of the Parole Board and said a law on indenture of women in some situations to the state should be taken down. In March he acted as moderator of a Bahá'í meeting at Brown University in Providence, Rhode Island. Approaching mid-April Bullock gave a talk at the Boston Bahá'í Center on "The Baha'i Revelation”. In early May he gave a talk at a public forum in Akron, Ohio, on "Is there a solution to the nation's racial problems?”. A few weeks later Bullock testified on Parole Board needs to the state government. In June Bullock's daughter and granddaughter were pictured in Detroit news and briefly profiled; she was a Simmons and Fisk college graduate and her husband was a teacher in Detroit. Meanwhile Bullock was among many who publicly supported Thomas E. Dewey for president in African American community coverage. In August he spoke of the Parole Board advise against a parole case, and was part of a panel at a conference organizing committee on crime prevention. The month closed with coverage of him speaking at the conference about how simple punishment of a prison system has not reduced the crime rate, and on supporting programs for prisoners to return to society as most prisoners were paroled one way or another. In September Bullock was the second runner up in the by-election to replace the deceased George Latimer on the National Spiritual Assembly of the Bahá'ís of the United States behind Leroy Ioas and Katherine True. In local and national Bahá'í elections, as opposed to the norm in general in America, there is no nomination process, no electioneering, in Bahá'í elections. In October Bullock spoke of a case of a revoked parole. The month closed with mention of Bullock as a member of fundraising support for Red Feather Campaign for societal relief and aide. In November was notice that Bullock's appointed position was to expire in April. Later that month he gave a talk at the Boston Bahá'í Center on "God's love for mankind”. In December came news of a Parole Board hearing on case.

January 1949 came news of another parole case commented on by Bullock. In March he gave a talk at the Bahá'í Center on "Progressive Religion”, and commented on another parole case. Mid-month Bullock spoke to the issue of women on the Parole Board as cases were mostly of men and some cases were harsh but if the law requiring women participation was passed he would not object to ensuring women were on board. Closing March there was newspaper coverage of Bullock's opposition to the Parole Board reviewing life sentences. March and early April Bullock joined an internationally diverse representation of the Bahá'í Faith to the UN meeting at Lake Success for the Third International Conference of NGOs which led to the Bahá'í participation on a committee on holding further events. Along with Bullock came Mildred Mottahedeh and Hilda Yen and others. In May Bullock received the next highest votes after the nine of the National Spiritual Assembly at the national convention - again it should be minded that Bahá'í elections have no electioneering. A few days later it was announced Bullock would be among faculty of Green Acre in May through June. Amidst these Bullock gave a talk at the Boston Bahá'í Center on "Why I am a Baha'i”. Bullock was mentioned at Green Acre in early June, and other talks in the vicinity too. A bit later there was a comment of Bullock's on a parole case, and June closed with notice that his appointment on the Parole Board had in fact expired June 2. Despite this expiration he had not been replaced yet and was quoted in the news on another case which also made national news. Some time over the previous year Bullock had been in Springfield giving a talk for the Bahá'ís as well. News on Bullock's position on the Parole Board remained uncertain, and he was still serving as chair of Parole Board in August. In September Bullock, with a biographical summary noting his life - as lawyer and vice-president of the Greater Boston Urban League, executive board member of Massachusetts Law Society, member of National Probation and Parole Association, WWI service, former USO trustee of Greater Boston, and on the Board of Adult Education Center - spoke at the Foreman home in Everett for the Bahá'ís. One hundred attended the meeting came from as far away as New York city and West Chester, Pennsylvania. In October Bullock was part of series of meetings at Boston Bahá'í Center for the fall, and continued to comment on parole cases as chair. Finally near the close of October his replacement on the Parole Board was named. Meanwhile Bullock gave a talk for UN Day entitled "The Earth is one Country”, and still he spoke out against a bill on prison sentencing reform as chair. With his imminent retirement there was mention of some interviews that were published in the Sunday Post and the Atlantic Monthly.

=== Retired and Bahá'í pioneer ===
Finally Bullock's replacement on the Parole Board was confirmed in November, 1949. Soon he chose to pioneer to Haiti and be a traveling promoter of the religion in the Caribbean area at request of the US National Spiritual Assembly with news in the Boston newspapers, followed by mention in the Bahá'í News. By May 1950 he was listed as a pioneer to Haiti, and by July Bullock participated in a Panama Bahá'í conference collecting presenters from across the region that mentioned he was coming from Port-au-Prince. He was back in Boston that summer and gave a talk "Security through religion” in the Bahá'í Center, and returned to Haiti where he was listed with another couple Bahá'í pioneers.

=== Back in the United States ===
Bullock was back in America in August first visible as an honorary pallbearer, and wrote a letter to editor about a Nazi and Communist refugee. In September he was finishing the work he had begun in December in Haiti. In October Bullock chaired a meeting for the Bahá'ís in Boston with a majority non-Bahá'í audience of 120. In later October Bullock served on an Easter Seal fundraising committee in Boston. In November Bullock gave a talk for the Boston community observance of the Birth of Bahá’u’lláh entitled "Baha'u'llah, the Christ of the 19th Century”. Bullock recalled the early April 1951 regional convention of the Bahá'ís of Central America, Mexico and the Antilles highlighting two points - first the overall orderliness of the convention and second the apparentness of spiritual virtues among the delegates. Then Bullock attended the US national convention as one of the Massachusetts delegates with others including Harlan Ober. The article covering this mentioned other news of and upcoming activities for Bullock: he had been chair of the Boston Bahá'í Assembly and of the Bahá'í Regional Teaching Committee for Massachusetts; and he went on a speaking tour in June of Salem, Beverly, Hamilton, Ipswich and Green Acre. He also was just appointed to a national Bahá'í committee focused on East and West Africa, and would be attending the dedication of the Panama City conference and election of their Regional National Assembly in Lima, Peru. Bullock's next appearance in the news was as a talk at the Boston Bahá'í Center entitled "A New Message for a New Day” and noted aiding Bahá'ís going to Africa while still associated with religion's development in Haiti and Caribbean. In July Bullock did a class at the Bahá'í summer school in Colorado focused on Bahá'í pioneering and then another at Louhelen Bahá'í School. In November Bullock joined others in giving a talk "World Conditions in light of the Bahá'í World Faith" and noting his career of service. In December he was a moderator of the panel of Omega Psi Phi Fraternity on "Securing World Peace by Strengthening Democracy".

In January and into April 1952 Bullock was in Cuba for both the Havana and Cienfuegos communities of Bahá'ís until the regional convention to elect the Central American National Assembly. He was the first delegate to arrive to the Costa Rica site of the convention for the regional National Spiritual Assembly and the hotel refused to admit him because of his skin color. The Bahá'ís quickly made other arrangements that would allow all races to attend. This might have been the 1952 convention.

=== Elected the National Spiritual Assembly of the Bahá'ís of the United States ===
In the US national convention Bullock was elected to National Spiritual Assembly of the Bahá'ís of the United States, and spoke at the convention on the African Committee's work and commenting on the need for Bahá'í pioneering of means as well as the importance of keeping up a correspondence with such pioneers to help bolster their spirits. It was also announced it was to be a Holy Year for Bahá'ís from October 1952 to October 1953 recalling the originating religious experience of Bahá'u'lláh as Bullock was listed as member of the National Spiritual Assembly and a member of several national committees - the United Nations Committee to aid representing the religion at the UN, the National Interracial Teaching Committee to manage reaching out to people of color and the understanding of the Bahá'í principle of the oneness of humanity under Sarah Pereira and serving alongside Helen Elsie Austin and Robert B. Powers, on the Legal Aid Committee to aid and advise on matters referred to the National Assembly along with Helen Elsie Austin and Horace Holley, and the Africa Teaching Committee under Austin on the African context of the Ten Year Crusade. In July Bullock read the talk given by 'Abdu'l-Bahá in Boston at their new Bahá'í Center commemorating the visit. In August speakers at a Green Acre summer session focused on Africa were with Bullock and others. By now it was known he had helped the religion in Haiti, Cuba and Costa Rica. A September newspaper article of Bullock because he was giving a talk on the religion recalled how he was asked by Secretary of the Navy Forrestal to review Pacific situation after WWII, and some former associations and currently active in Urban League. He spoke again at the end of September at the Boston Bahá'í Center on "The Distinguishing features of the Baha'i Faith”. In October he was again on tour around several Bahá'í communities but started with an AME Church giving a talk for Rt. Rev. Edgar Amos Love, and went on to the DC Bahá'í community where there was mention of future plans to speak at the Bahá'í House of Worship in Wilmette, and going to the intercontinental Uganda Conference in 1953. In December Bullock spoke in Lansing Michigan for the Omega Psi Phi meeting about "Democracy - now or never”. He also spoke at the Bahá'í Michigan state convention. He was one of the Massachusetts delegates to the national convention.

=== Pilgrimage, Knight of Bahá'u'lláh, Jubilee Year service ===
In 1953 he went on Baháʼí pilgrimage before attending the Intercontinental Bahá'í Conference in Uganda. He said of it: "The Guardian has cleared up many things for me. My visit to him and to the Holy Shrines are experiences beyond words. I don't think I will ever be able to express what it meant to me; nor do I think that any Bahá'í is the same after being with the Guardian. I wish every Bahá'í could have the bounty which has been mine.” Then he was at the Ugandan Conference with mention in the Pittsburgh Courier. Helen Elsie Austin and he were representatives of the American National Spiritual Assembly to the conference; African Committee member Van Sombeek was also present. Bullock and Dorothy Beecher Baker led the second public meeting. News coverage of the event was slanted leading to lively comment and a chance to correct the statement. They spoke at the second public event of February. Bullock presided over the meeting while Baker gave a talk. For the next few months Bullock traveled around Africa including the Belgian Congo, and then he visited Liberia where he helped with contact with President Tubman so that Bahá'í pioneers were reinstated at their jobs at a hospital they lost December 1952 over circumstances and confusions of their intents and choices. Bullock was also invited to a special diplomatic dinner and addressed the audience on the religion. By March it was announced Bullock would give a weekend session at Louhelen Bahá'í School in Michigan in mid-July on "The New Africa”. Come April he and Austin were again elected to the US Bahá'í National Assembly. This part of the holy year and dedication of the Bahá'í House of Worship in Wilmette, Illinois. Bullock chaired the public evening program held at Medina Temple, N. Wahabsh Ave, April 29, followed by being the fifth reader of the session after the keynote by Rúhiyyih Khánum May 2 and read from the Qur'an recalling Louis Gregory's reading in 1944: "O our Lord! punish us not if we forget, or fall into sin… O our Lord!… lay not on us that for which we have not strength: but blot out our sins and forgive us, and have pity on us.” (Al-Baqarah - The Cow - 2:286 ). A major announcement at the time was of the Ten Year Crusade. The Ten Year Crusade had the goal of expanding the service of pioneers, whose goal was to promulgate the religion by aiding the establishment of Bahá'í communities based in the local population, by expanding the horizon of goals to embrace the world wide society of humanity and raise regional and national institutions of the religion based on those local developments. In July Bullock spoke at Louhelen Bahá'í School on “The New Africa". By August 31 three members of the US National Spiritual Assembly announced their retirement from the assembly in order to pioneer in honor of the Ten Year Crusade: Bullock, Baker and Austin, via a telegraph to which Shoghi Effendi responded to by telegraph: "Overjoyed remarkable achievements American Baha'i Community, safeguarding primacy, enhancing prestige, setting magnificent example sister communities East West. Assure three Assembly members, also Lofoten valiant pioneer, abiding appreciation, fervent loving prayers." In October Bullock gave a talk back in Boston at the Bahá'í Center entitled "Mount your steeds”. Bullock was noted arrived in the Dutch West Indies November 20, 1953. It was a virgin location so he was named a Knight of Bahá'u'lláh. This was on a tourist visa so he regularly had to leave the island and seek to return. By January 1954 the resignations from the national assembly had reached 5 adding William Kenneth Christian and Mamie Setto. Inbetween being in Curaçao he gave a talk in Boston on the book Portals to Freedom by Howard Colby Ives. Bullock returned to Curacao December 6, 1954. He gave a World Religion Day talk in early January. He left again in mid-April and was able to return in the fall. A stable active Bahá'í community soon formed while he was there with the assistance of other pioneers. Around 1955 while pioneering in the Dutch West Indies Bullock also assisted the Iberian National Assembly incorporate with registration with the Spanish government so that it could perform weddings, and traveled among other West Indies communities.

=== Tours and schools ===
Bullock was appointed to lifetime position of directors of the Greater Boston Urban League in March 1955. Across July–August Bullock was mentioned attended Bahá'í meetings in Falmouth and Plymouth. In January 1956 Bullock visited his son in Philadelphia. In August, noting his history in and outside of America, Bullock spoke to the Bahá'ís of Marshfield, and a couple weeks later taught a class at Green Acre mentioning he had traveled to Spain and Curacao in the West Indies. In October he officiated funeral of Anna Tucker in Amesbury. In December mention came of Bullock at the Van Sombeek home in Durham, North Carolina, and though a short article it was on the front page.

In June 1957 Bullock was among Red Feather Organization directors in the Boston area. This was the year of the death of Shoghi Effendi in November. The next news on Bullock came in June 1958 when he gave the keynote talk at the Bahá'í Race Amity Day observance in Hackensack, New Jersey. There was a quote and summary published in the newspaper - "Only through spiritual civilization will we create world harmony.… World harmony will eventually lead to world peace as promised by the prophets of God…. We should learn to love one another beginning with our family. If everyone in the world did this there would be no wars or worldwide disputes." About 100 people attended the event. In October Bullock gave a talk at the Boston Education Center on the theme "Visits with interesting people". Bullock was known to visit St. Thomas Island in December.

In August 1959 Bullock taught class at the Laurentian Bahá'í School in Canada. In October Bullock spoke for the community observance of the Birth of the Báb in Portsmouth, New Hampshire. In later 1959 Bullock toured four cities of North Carolina speaking to an estimated 1460 people all together, in Durham, Raleigh, Greensboro, and Charlotte he spoke at colleges and homes.

In March 1960 he aided the Easter Seals fundraising campaign in Boston. The Bahá'ís held a UN Day in October with a symposium with Bullock saying adding spirituality to the UN activities was important.

In 1960 he moved to Jamaica briefly and then visited Curacao several times until 1964 while living in Boston. His health was troubled and he was aided by members of the Boston Bahá'í community in his care "through the dark days of pain and incapacity” as Austin puts it.

There was no word from Bullock for a few years. He next appears in 1963 back in Raleigh, North Carolina, and then in Greenville, South Carolina, saying: "In order to find truth and know God, we must give up all kinds of prejudices”. A memoir of a Bahá'í recalls meeting Bullock in these later years of Bullock in this visit to Greenville: “Matthew was, without doubt, the most dignified and proper gentleman I’ve ever met. He wore a suite and tie ‘’every single day’’. He's the only man I’ve ever seen eat a hamburger with a knife and fork." In October Bullock attended at luncheon for Dartmouth, and in November officiated at funeral of a Bahá'í in Nashua. In December he gave a talk at Human Rights Day cosponsored by the Bahá'ís and the NAACP chapter in Connecticut again giving a profile of his life and work inside and outside America. A few days later he gave a talk entitled "The Negro Awakening” in Hartford.

In August 1964 Bullock was a co-presenter of Bahá'ís at the Gravity Research Foundation Institute in New Boston, New Hampshire, August 29, 1964. In September Bullock spoke at the dedication of a cabin at Camp Atwater in New York state out of his old friendship with Rev. Dr. William DeBerry. Then he returned to North Carolina in 1965 as the main speaker at the World Religion Day observance held at what is today the University of North Carolina at Durham. Inbetween his visits to Durham the first Local Spiritual Assembly of Durham had been elected which included Van Sombeek. Later in February Bullock was hosted by Van Sombeek and gave talks in the area some two weeks. In April Bullock gave a talk entitled "What it means to be a Baha'i" at the Community Church in Boston.

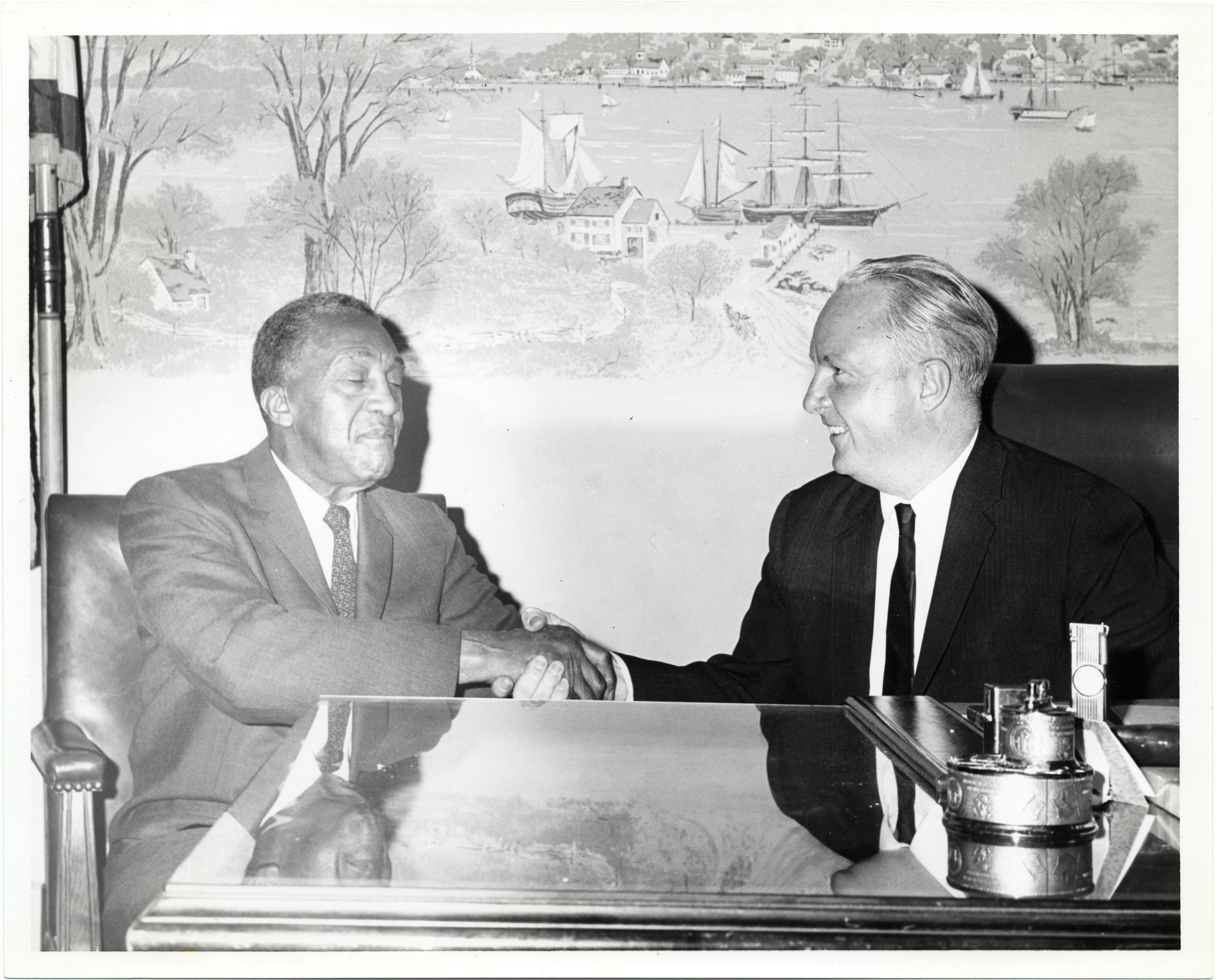
Bullock (left) shaking hands with Boston mayor John F. Collins after being appointed to the Boston Zoning Board

In June Bullock was named to a Zoning Commission following the meeting of Rev. Dr. Martin Luther King at Boston with Mayor Collins.

In May 1966 Bullock's history was profiled and with personal quotes in The Boston Globe in a series entitled "Whatever became of…" - of more detail than previous published. Bullock spoke of how he had been captain of the football, baseball and ice polo teams, and played left tackle in football at Everett High School, how at Dartmouth he had been in football, track, and sang in the Glee Club and had been mentioned with All-American football lists. He recalled he had coached in University of Massachusetts at Amherst Massachusetts Agricultural and Mechanical School and then to Malden. And Bullock mentioned his parents had been born into slavery and that his grandfather Washington Sneed had been killed by the KKK by being thrown into an abandoned well and Bullock's mother's mother had found it all during the first rise of the KKK in North Carolina. He spoke of being turned down for WWI service for age or what he called an "athlete's heart" and served via the YMCA and attended the dedication of the Unknown Soldier in Arlington Cemetery. He spoke of how he chose the Bahá'í Faith which had no clergy and how he had embarked on a "personal crusade" for 10 years traveling for the promotion of the religion, and a long service amidst which he helped dedicate the Bahá'í Temple in Wilmette and hoped yet to go to Scandinavia and Brazil.

Bullock's brother William Henry died in January 1967. In June Bullock made an appearance in among the Bahá'ís in Durham, North Carolina. That year he moved to be cared for by his daughter in Detroit and then a nursing home.

=== Last years ===
Bullock co-writer of 5 page biographical article of Bahá'í Harlan Ober, a founder of the Boston Bahá'í community, that was published in 1970. The Boston Assembly obtained an incorporation and granted the authority to hold legal marriages in 1946. Ober married his second wife Elizabeth Kidder Ober in June 1941 and went on his third pilgrimage in 1956 after which they pioneered to Pretoria, South Africa, and helped raise its first all-African spiritual assembly. Harlan died July 20, 1962, buried in Pretoria.

In 1970 came his first honorary degree for Bullock - from Harvard University. This was followed by Dartmouth in 1971 with an honorary law degree where he received a standing ovation among the 5000 present. The citation read in part:

Concern for your fellow man continued to occupy your energies after retirement. You are a recognized leader of the Bahá'í Faith, and you have traveled all over the world at your own expense in the interest of that religion. You believe very deeply that the establishment of universal justice and freedom requires the spiritual and moral awakening of all people….”

Bullock had met Dartmouth President John Kemeny who noted his achievements. Bullock died December 17, 1972, at the home of his daughter in Detroit. He provided the program for his own funeral, and a testimonial telegram came from the Universal House of Justice:

GRIEVED PASSING KNIGHT BAHAULLAH MATTHEW BULLOCK DISTINGUISHED PROMOTER FAITH CONVEY FAMILY ASSURANCE PRAYERS HOLY THRESHOLD PROGRESS HIS SOUL ADVISE HOLD MEMORIAL GATHERING MASHRIQULADHKAR

The memorial requested was held February 17, 1973.

Son Bullock Jr. was a judge in Philadelphia and his daughter lived on in Detroit. He died in 2013.

Bullock Sr. was buried in Mt. Hope Cemetery, Mattapan, Massachusetts.

== Remembrance ==
It was remembered that Bullock had criticized the prison system for its mixing of hardened criminals with misguided youngsters, as well as that in 1946 he was attacked by a parole seeker and subdued the prisoner himself at the age of 65.

In 1974 the Bahá'ís remembered him being part of national assembly that left that service to pioneer, as well as being part of the dedication of the Bahá'í Temple with media coverage noting Bullock and Baker in 1975. A three page biography with pictures was published next in Baha’i News largely similar to the Baha’i World article by Austin. This was extended in 1983 a few black community newspapers including in The National Leader had a historical review of Bahá'ís who were black with mention of Bullock alongside Robert Sengstacke Abbott, Alain LeRoy Locke, Glenford Mitchell, Louis Gregory, Helen Elsie Austin, Dizzy Gillespie, Robert Hayden, and others.

In 2006 Bullock's achievement as black coach at Massachusetts Agricultural and Mechanical College, now the University of Massachusetts at Amherst, was remembered distantly. It would be 71 years before the next such coach who then was called a conqueror of racial hostility. A decade later Bullock's time at the University of Massachusetts at Amherst was remembered briefly as part of a general review of diversity among students at the college.

In 2017 a biographical article on Bullock was published in The Bay State Banner was published, and Black Alumni of Dartmouth Association also sponsored an article. Bullock's time at Dartmouth was featured in an audio podcast with scholar Derrick White.

In 2020 the Everett community sponsored an article on Bullock.

Most recently, in February 2021, the University of Massachusetts Athletics Department noted Bullock.

== Head coaching record ==
=== College ===
Year	Team	Overall	Conference	Standing	Bowl/playoffs
Massachusetts Aggies (Independent) (1904)
1904	Massachusetts	5–2–1			
Massachusetts Aggies (Independent) (1907–1908)
1907	Massachusetts	5–3–1			
1908	Massachusetts	3–3–3			
Massachusetts:		13–8–5			
Atlanta Baptist Tigers (Independent) (1909–1911)
1909	Atlanta Baptist	5–0–1			
1910	Atlanta Baptist	4–1			
1911	Atlanta Baptist	4–1			
Atlanta Baptist:		13–2–1			
Lincoln Lions (Colored Intercollegiate Athletic Association) (1916)
1916	Lincoln	2–3	0–3	4th	
Lincoln:		2–3	0–3		
Alabama A&M Bulldogs (Independent) (1924–1926)
1924	Alabama A&M	0–2			
1925	Alabama A&M	0–1			
1926	Alabama A&M	0–1			
Alabama A&M:		0–4			
Total:		28–17–6			

== See also ==
- List of college football head coaches with non-consecutive tenure
