= David F. Weeks =

American football player, coach, and doctor (1874–1929)

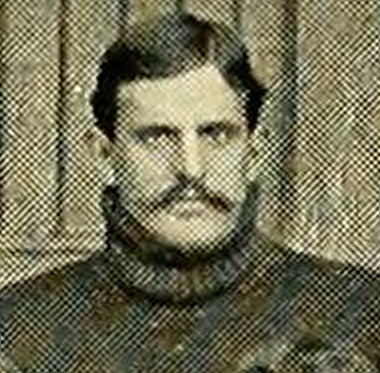
- Weeks pictured in the 1898 Massachusetts Agricultural football team photo

Biographical details
- Born: July 31, 1874; Newark, New Jersey, U.S.
- Died: March 15, 1929 (aged 54); Skillman, New Jersey, U.S.

Playing career
- 1896–1897: Penn
- Position: Quarterback

Coaching career (HC unless noted)
- 1898: Massachusetts

Head coaching record
- Overall: 1–4–1

David Fairchild Weeks (July 31, 1874 – March 15, 1929) was a eugenicist, an American football player, coach, and doctor. He was the first head football coach at Massachusetts Agricultural College—now the University of Massachusetts Amherst, holding the position for one season, in 1898, and compiling a record of 1–4–1. Weeks graduated in 1897 from the University of Pennsylvania and played quarterback for the Penn Quakers football team.

Weeks was born in 1874 to Henry Martin Weeks, a doctor, and Mary Malvina Fairchild Weeks. He married Maude Adele Clampitt in Pennsylvania in 1902.

Weeks later practiced medicine after his graduation from Penn, briefly in Pennsylvania and his home state of New Jersey. Weeks also was involved in the research of eugenics, the nervous system, and mental illnesses, (primarily epilepsy) also serving as Superintendent and medical director of the New Jersey State Village for Epileptics at Skillman, New Jersey from December 1907 until his sudden death from heart disease in 1929. His career was marked by an active involvement in the American eugenics movement and collaboration with Charles Davenport and Harry H. Laughlin. He helped to draft New Jersey's sterilization law, permitting the nonconsensual sterilization of disabled people, which was passed in 1911 and struck down in 1913.

He is buried in Blawenburg Reformed Church Cemetery in Somerset County, New Jersey.

== Head coaching record ==
| Year | Team | Overall | Conference | Standing | Bowl/playoffs |
|---|---|---|---|---|---|
Massachusetts Aggies (Independent) (1898)
| 1898 | Massachusetts | 1–4–1 | | | |
| Massachusetts: | | 1–4–1 | | | |
| Total: | | 1–4–1 | | | |
