= Alumni Field (Amherst, Massachusetts) =

Multi-purpose stadium in Amherst, Massachusetts

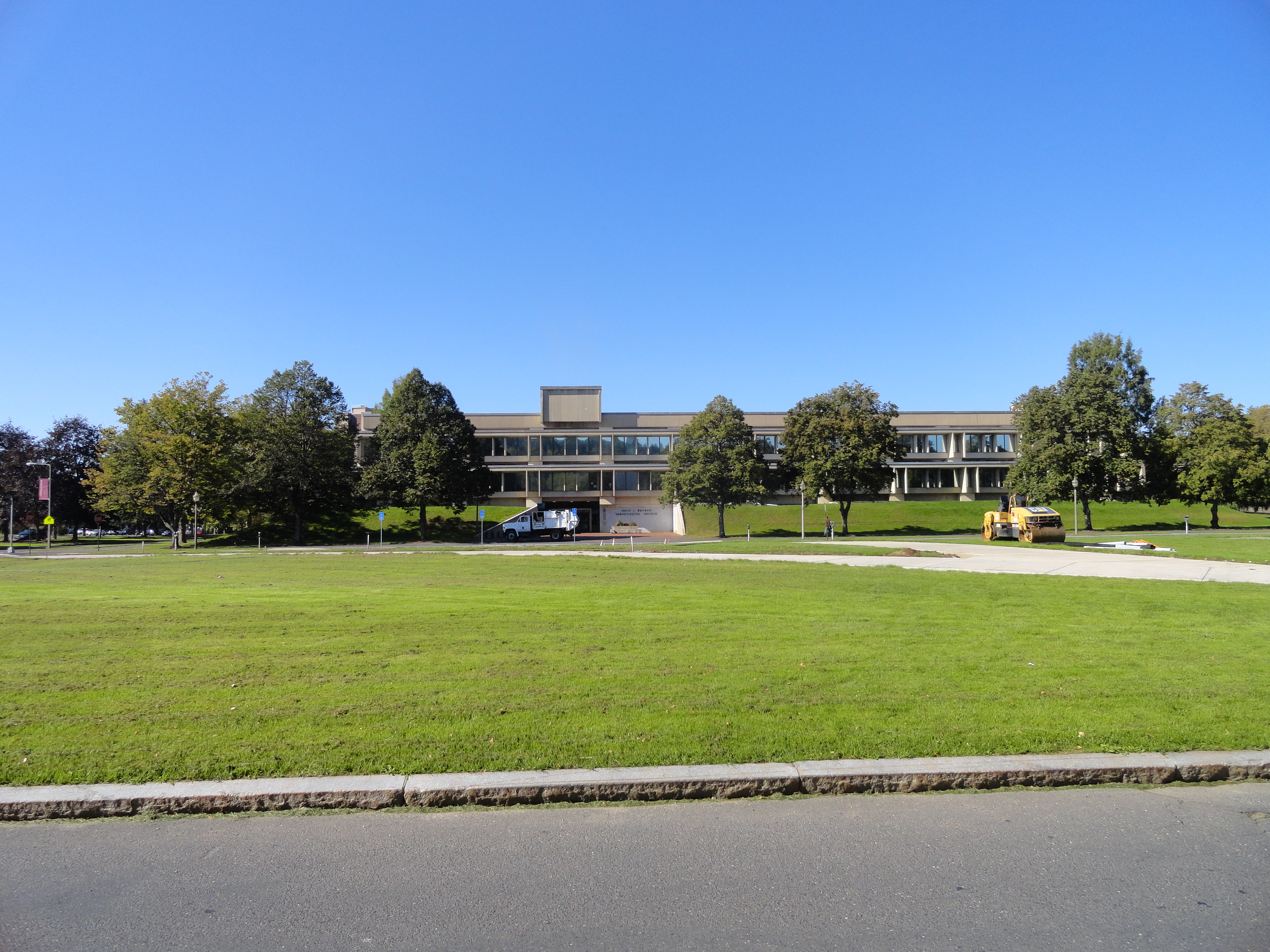
- Whitmore Administration Building, located on the spot of the former field
- Interactive map of Alumni Field
- Location: Amherst, Massachusetts 01003
- Coordinates: 42°23′9.31″N 72°31′35.74″W
- Owner: University of Massachusetts Amherst
- Operator: University of Massachusetts Amherst
- Capacity: Unknown
- Surface: Grass

Construction
- Opened: 1879
- Closed: 1964
- Demolished: 1965

Tenant
- UMass Redmen (NCAA) (1879-1964)

Alumni Field was a multi-purpose stadium in Amherst, Massachusetts on the campus of the University of Massachusetts Amherst. It was home to the UMass Redmen football team from around 1879 to 1964, when it was replaced by Warren McGuirk Alumni Stadium in nearby Hadley. Today, the former location of the field is the location of the Philip F. Whitmore Administration Building.
