= John MacDonald (American football) =

American football coach

Biographical details
- Born: January 21, 1885; Boston, Massachusetts, U.S.
- Died: September 22, 1962 (aged 77); Lowell, Massachusetts, U.S.
- Education: College of the Holy Cross

Coaching career (HC unless noted)
- 1914–1917: Beverly HS (MA)
- 1918–1919: Watertown HS (MA)
- 1918–1919: Boston University
- 1920–1923: Malden HS (MA)
- 1924–1926: Watertown HS (MA)

Head coaching record
- Overall: 3–6–1

John Griffin MacDonald (January 21, 1885 – September 22, 1962) was an American football coach. He was a longtime high school football coach in Massachusetts and served as the head football coach at Boston University from 1918 to 1919, where he compiled a record of 3–6–1. He was the father of Congressman Torbert Macdonald.

MacDonald attended Brighton High School, Boston Latin School and the College of the Holy Cross, where he played baseball, football, and track. He began his coaching career at Beverly High School in 1914. He led BHS to an unexpected championship in football his first year as head coach and was given the additional duty of head baseball coach the following year. In 1918, MacDonald moved to Watertown High School. After coaching at Malden High School from 1920 to 1923, MacDonald returned to Watertown, were remained until a pay dispute resulted in his contract not being renewed after the 1926–27 school year. He returned to the Malden Public Schools, where he taught until his retirement in 1952. MacDonald died on September 22, 1962, and was buried in Holy Cross Cemetery in Malden, Massachusetts.

== Head coaching record ==
Year	Team	Overall	Conference	Standing	Bowl/playoffs
Boston University (Independent) (1918–1919)
1918	Boston University	1–3–1			
1919	Boston University	2–3			
Boston University:		3–6–1			
Total:		3–6–1			
