= Warren McGuirk =

American football player and coach and college athletics administrator (1906–1981)

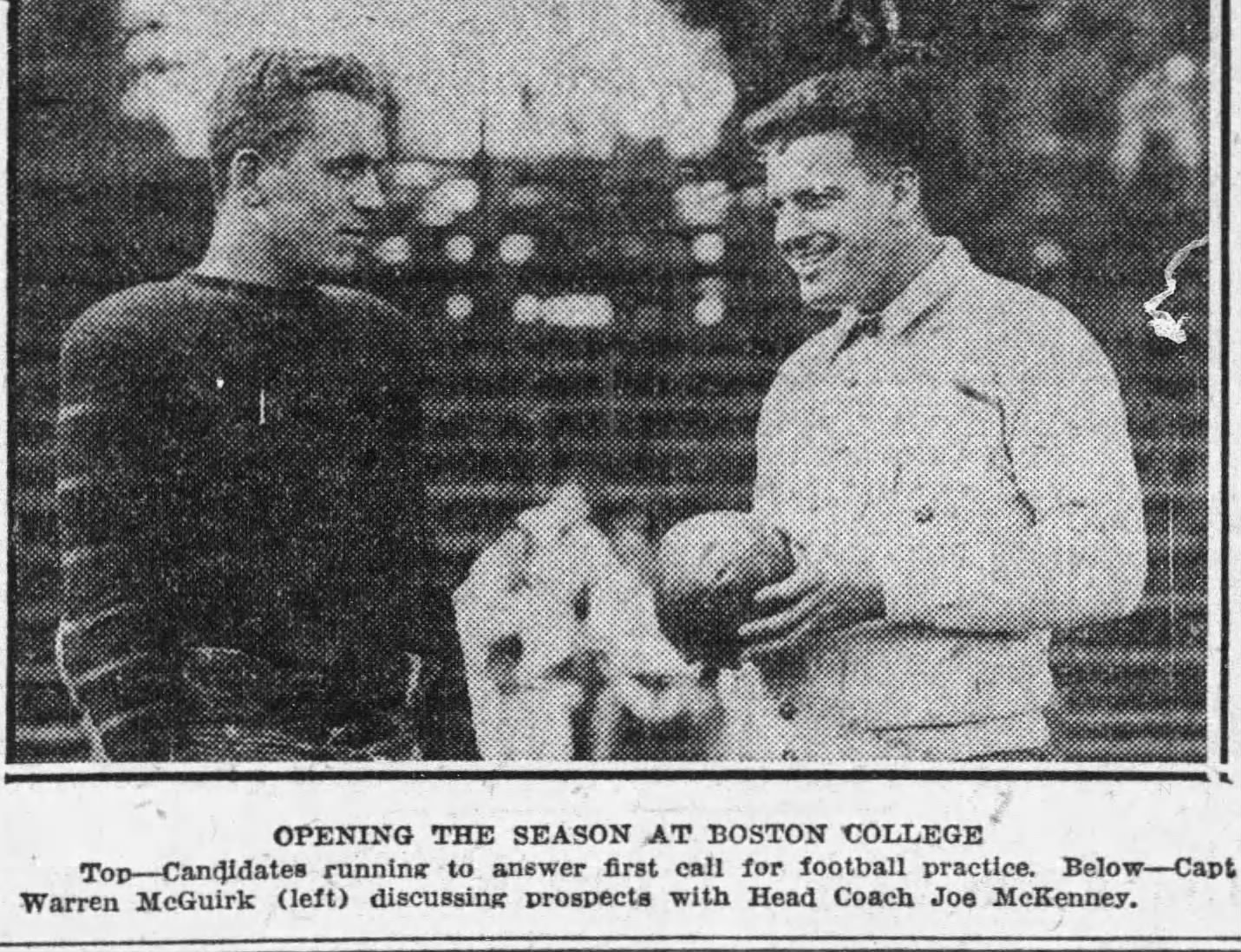
- Joe McKenney and Warren P. McGuirk

Biographical details
- Born: January 2, 1906; Boston, Massachusetts, U.S.
- Died: February 19, 1981 (aged 75); Boston, Massachusetts, U.S.

Playing career
- 1925–1928: Boston College
- 1929–1930: Providence Steamrollers
- Position: Tackle

Coaching career (HC unless noted)
- 1931–1941: Malden HS (MA)

Administrative career (AD unless noted)
- 1948–1972: UMass

Warren Pierce McGuirk (January 2, 1906 – February 19, 1981) was an American football player and coach and college athletics administrator. He played college football at Boston College as a tackle, serving as captain of the undefeated 1928 Boston College Eagles football team. After graduating from Boston College in 1929, McGuirk played professional football for two seasons in the National Football League (NFL) with the Providence Steamrollers. From 1931 to 1942, he was head football coach and director of physical education at Malden High School in Malden, Massachusetts. During World War II, McGuirk served in the United States Navy, reaching the rank of commander before being discharged in 1946. He was appointed the athletic director at the University of Massachusetts Amherst (UMass) in 1948, a post he occupied until his retirement on January 1, 1972.

McGuirk attended Dorchester High School in Dorchester, Boston, Massachusetts, and also Saint Anselm Prep in Goffstown, New Hampshire.

McGuirk died on February 19, 1981, at New England Medical Center in Boston. His wife died February 8 of that year. The Warren McGuirk Alumni Stadium at UMass is named in his honor.
