= Daniel Merriam =

American painter

- Born: 1963 (age 62–63); York, Maine
- Known for: Painting, Illustration
- Movement: surrealist
- Awards: New England Scholastic Press Association Award

Daniel Merriam is a contemporary surrealist and is best known for his dry brush technique and imaginative style.

== Biography ==
Merriam grew up in York Harbor, Maine and is one of seven children. He studied mechanical and architectural design at Central Maine Vocational Technical Institute. He later worked for his family's design and construction business and as an architectural and commercial illustrator. He had his first solo exhibition as a fine artist at Abacus Gallery in Maine in 1987.

Merriam has produced paintings for the covers of books by Paula Volsky and Neal Barrett Jr. published by Bantam Books, as well as for the Mid-American Review. His work was also used on the playbill of A Midsummer Night's Dream by William Shakespeare produced by the McCarter Theatre in New Jersey. He published two catalogs of collections of his paintings in 1998 and 2007, which are both part of the permanent archives at the Los Angeles County Museum of Art, the National Museum of American Illustration, and the Peninsular Museum of Art.

He has had exhibitions in the United States, Europe and the Middle East. Merriam's work is included in the public collections of The Riverside Museum of Art, Merrill Lynch, The Gesundheit! Institute, the Manhattan Club, among others.

== Recognitions ==
Merriam's awards include several first-place Broderson Awards and the first-place New England Scholastics Press Association Award for editorial cartooning. In 1987, he received an Honorary Masters of Humane Letters from the University of New England in recognition of the potential social contribution of his work.

== Catalogues raisonné ==
- Taking Reality by Surprise. San Francisco: Monarch Editions, Inc., 2010. ISBN 978-0-9797157-1-6
- The Art of Daniel Merriam: The Eye of a Dreamer, 1997–2007. San Francisco: Monarch Editions, Inc., 2007. ISBN 978-0-9797157-0-9
- The Art of Daniel Merriam: The Impetus of Dreams, 1988–1997. San Francisco: Monarch Editions, Inc., 1998. ISBN 0-9658347-0-0
