= Charles Gelly =

Canadian-American ice hockey player and coach

- Born: December 9, 1901 Quebec City, Quebec, Canada
- Died: July 28, 1998 (aged 96) Gloucester, Massachusetts, U.S.
- Position: Forward
- Played for: Quebec St. Valier; Lewiston St. Doms; Lewiston-Auburn Twins
- Coaching career

Coaching career (HC unless noted)
- 1930–1932: Bates

Charles Edward Gelly (December 9, 1901 – July 28, 1998) was a Canadian ice hockey player and coach who played amateur hockey in Quebec City and Lewiston, Maine and was head coach of the Bates Bobcats men's ice hockey team.

== Early life ==
Gelly was born on December 9, 1901, in Quebec City to Charles E. and Georgiana (Monier) Gelly. He had one brother and two sisters who both became nuns. He spent his summers working on boats on the St. Lawrence River and played hockey during the winter.

== Playing ==
Gelly played for a hockey team sponsored by the Canadian Pacific Railway. During the 1923–24 season, he was a member of the St. Valier team that won the Quebec City League championship.

In 1924, Gelly joined the St. Doms hockey team in Lewiston. He was recruited to the team by his friend, Victor Lacombe, who was the team's goaltender. He played a big role in St. Doms winning the 1925–26 Maine state championship. For the 1928–29 season, St. Doms officials formed a Lewiston-Auburn club. Gelly scored a goal in the Lewiston-Auburn Twins's inaugural game, which was a 3–1 victory over the Excelsior club of Quebec on Christmas Day. Two days later, he announced his retirement. He would remain involved in amateur hockey as an official.

== Coaching ==
In 1930, Bates hockey coach Dave Morey was unable due to coach due to poor health. Morey secured Gelly to fill in for him, paying him personally. Gelly was brought back for the following season after Morey's doctors recommended he take the winter off after a strenuous football season. He led Bates to Maine state championships in both of his seasons as head coach.

By accepting the Bates coaching position, Gelly lost his amateur status and was unable to play amateur hockey again. He applied to the Amateur Athletic Union for reinstatement, but was unsuccessful. He played some independent hockey and continued to officiate games until 1937.

== Personal life ==
After his second season with the St. Doms, he chose to remain in Lewiston year-round. He felt the city had less class distinction compared to Quebec. He spent over twenty years as an foreman for the P&P Fuel Company, then worked for the Enterprise Foundry until his retirement in 1973. He then moved to Gloucester, Massachusetts, where he died on July 28, 1998. He was survived by his wife and two children and predeceased by a daughter.
