= Dave Morey =

American sportsman (1889-1986)

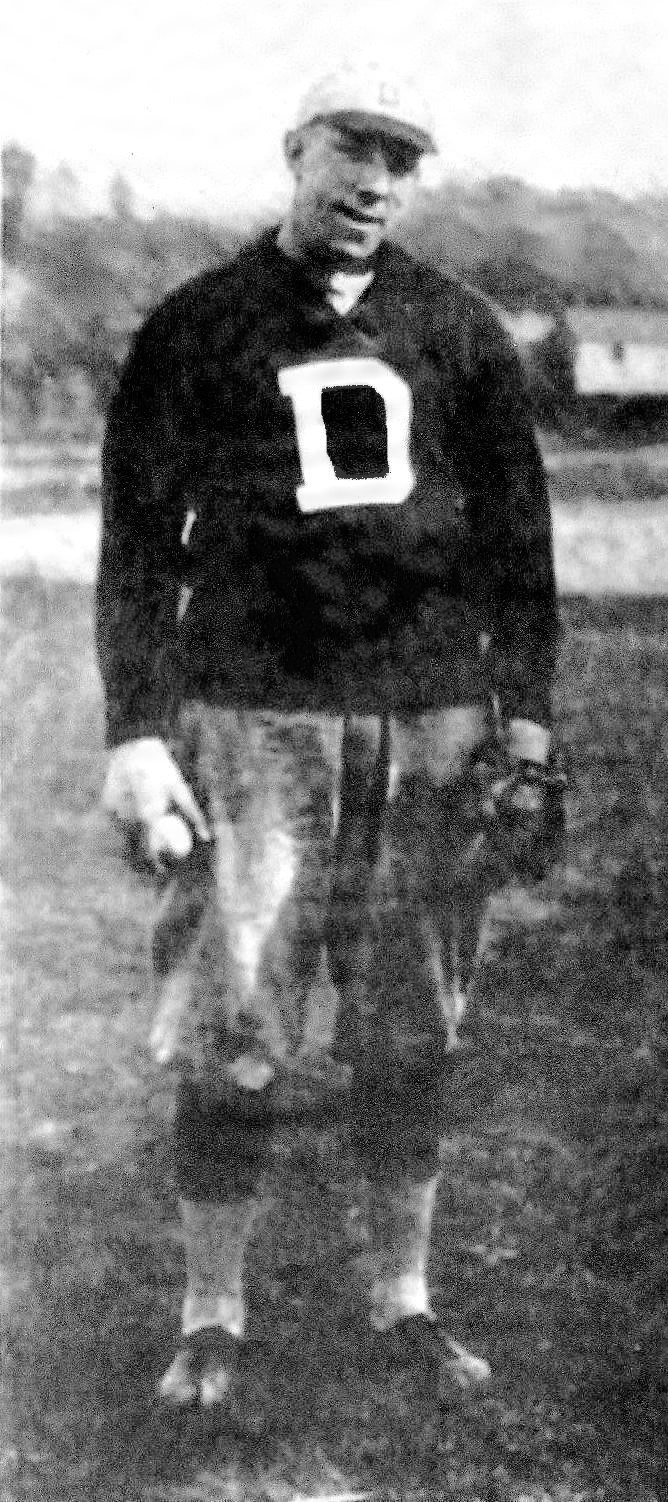

Biographical details
- Born: February 25, 1889; Malden, Massachusetts, U.S.
- Died: January 4, 1986 (aged 96); Oak Bluffs, Massachusetts, U.S.

Playing career

Football
- 1910–1912: Dartmouth

Baseball
- 1911–1913: Dartmouth
- 1913: Philadelphia Athletics
- Positions: Halfback (football); Pitcher (baseball)

Coaching career (HC unless noted)

Football
- 1914: Dartmouth (assistant)
- 1916–1918: Lowell Textile
- 1921–1924: Middlebury
- 1925–1927: Auburn
- 1928: Fordham (assistant)
- 1929–1939: Bates
- 1948–1950: Lowell Tech

Basketball
- 1924–1925: Middlebury
- 1948–1959: Lowell Tech

Baseball
- 1919: Malden HS (MA)
- 1921–1925: Middlebury
- 1926: Auburn
- 1929: Boston University
- 1930–1932: Bates
- 1935–1939: Bates

Ice hockey
- 1929–1930: Bates

Accomplishments and honors

Awards
- Football; 2× Second-team All-American (1911, 1912)

David Beale Morey (February 25, 1889 – January 4, 1986) was an American football and baseball player, coach of a number of sports, and college athletics administrator. He was an All-American football player for Dartmouth College in 1912 and a professional baseball pitcher for the Philadelphia Athletics in 1913. Morey coached football and baseball at the Lowell Technological Institute (1916–1917, 1948–1959), Middlebury College (1921–1924), Auburn University (1925–1927), Fordham University (1928), and Bates College (1929–1939). After leading small colleges to ties against college football powers Harvard and Yale, Morey was given the nickname, "David the Giant Killer" by Grantland Rice.

== Playing career ==
=== Early years ===
Morey was a native of Malden, Massachusetts. He played baseball and football, and also competed on the track team, at Malden High School. In June 1909, Morey struck out 25 batters in a baseball game against Everett High School.

=== Dartmouth College ===
Morey attended Dartmouth College where he played for three years each with the school's Dartmouth Big Green football and Dartmouth Big Green baseball teams. He was captain of Dartmouth's baseball team during his senior year in 1913.

Morey played right halfback for Dartmouth's football team from 1910 to 1912. After the 1912 season, he was selected as a first-team All-American by W. J. MacBeth and a second-team All-American by Walter Camp.

=== Professional baseball player ===
Dave Morey
- Pitcher
- Batted: Left Threw: Right

MLB debut
- July 4, 1913, for the Philadelphia Athletics

Last MLB appearance
- July 17, 1913, for the Philadelphia Athletics

MLB statistics
- Win–loss record: 0–0
- Earned run average: 4.50
- Strikeouts: 1
- Stats at Baseball Reference

Teams
- Philadelphia Athletics (1913)

Morey graduated from Dartmouth in 1913 and was signed by Connie Mack of the Philadelphia Athletics. He was a right-handed pitcher and a left-handed batter, and played in two games for the Athletics during their 1913 season.

On July 4, Morey pitched three innings of relief in the first game of a doubleheader against the Boston Red Sox at Fenway Park, allowing two runs on two hits. Baseball Hall of Famers dotted both teams' lineups, as the A's featured Eddie Collins and Home Run Baker, while Boston featured Tris Speaker and Harry Hooper. The A's took a 13-6 loss at the hands of Boston's Hall of Fame moundsman, Smoky Joe Wood.

Morey's second big league appearance came on July 17 in a 5-2 loss to the Chicago White Sox at Comiskey Park. Morey pitched the eighth inning in relief of Philadelphia starter Bullet Joe Bush, and retired the White Sox side in order. In two major league appearances, Morey did not have any decisions and compiled an earned run average of 4.50. He came to bat once, but did not reach base.

Morey also played minor league baseball in the New England League, playing for the Worcester Busters in 1914, and the Manchester Textiles in 1915.

== Coaching career ==
=== Early coaching positions ===
In the fall of 1914, Morey returned to Dartmouth as the school's freshman football coach, working as an assistant to Frank "Major" Cavanaugh. He also worked for the American Felt Company in Boston. He also served briefly as the baseball coach for Boston University.

From 1916 to 1917, Morey was the football coach at Lowell Textile Institute, later renamed Lowell Technological Institute. Following the entry of the United States into World War I, Morey served in the United States armed forces. In 1919, Morey returned to Malden High School as the school's baseball coach.

Between 1915 and 1921, Morey spent his summers on Cape Cod, playing for the Oak Bluffs and Falmouth town teams in what is now the Cape Cod Baseball League. Morey played for Oak Bluffs in 1915 and 1916, then for a combined Oak Bluffs-Falmouth team in 1918, taking over the combined team as player-manager in 1919, and remaining as player-manager with the Falmouth team in 1920 and 1921. Morey's 1919 team featured Baseball Hall of Famer Pie Traynor.

=== Middlebury College ===
In July 1920, Morey was hired by Middlebury College in Middlebury, Vermont as assistant to the school's athletic director. Morey was given the responsibility for developing the school's football team.

In 1921, Morey took over as the school's head football coach. Over the next four years, Morey helped turn the program around, improving from a record of 2–6 in 1922 to 7–1 in 1924. The most notable win during Morey's tenure at Middlebury was a 6–6 tie with Harvard in 1923, then one of the top football programs in the country. Two drop kicks by Middlebury's Al Klevenow provided the scoring in the tie with Harvard. Morey took particular pride in the tie against Harvard, noting that Middlebury had a total male enrollment of 140 at the time.

In 1924, Morey's Middlebury eleven outscored its opponents 254–44, won high-scoring honors among all of the Eastern football teams, and lost only one game—to Harvard. Morey was also the coach of Middlebury's baseball and basketball teams from 1921 to 1925.

In February 1925, Morey announced his resignation as coach at Middlebury, effective at the end of the baseball season in June 1925. He stated that his one and only reason for leaving Middlebury was the ill health of his wife, which could only be remedied by residence in a warmer client.

=== Auburn University ===
In September 1925, Morey was hired as the head football coach at Auburn University in Alabama. Morey was the head coach at Auburn for three years (1925–1927), compiling an overall record of 10–10–1 at the school. The highlight of Morey's tenure with Auburn was a 2–0 win over Bernie Bierman's Tulane squad in the game that dedicated New Orleans' famous Sugar Bowl. In 1927, Morey's Auburn football team lost its starting quarterback, who was expelled after being caught sneaking into the women's dormitory following a night of drunken reverie. The team opened the 1927 season with an 0–3 record, including embarrassing losses to Stetson College and Clemson. At a pep rally six days after the loss to Clemson, Morey announced his resignation.

=== Fordham University and NYU ===
After leaving Auburn, Morey returned north and accepted a position as an assistant football coach at Fordham University working under Frank Cavanaugh—who had previously been Morey's head coach at Dartmouth. He also undertook graduate work in physical education at New York University, where he also taught classes in athletic coaching.

=== Bates College ===
On January 1, 1929, Morey was hired by Bates College in Lewiston, Maine as the head coach of its football, baseball and ice hockey teams. He spent the spring as the head baseball coach at Boston University before joining Bates that fall. In 1932, sports writer Grantland Rice gave Morey the nickname "David the Giant Killer" after his Bates College football team played a highly touted Yale team to a scoreless tie. Morey remained at Bates until 1939. In ten years at Bates, his football teams compiled a record of 28–33–9. In June 1939, Morey unexpectedly resigned his position at Bates. He left his decision unexplained other than a public statement that, "There's no place at Bates for me now." Following the announcement, students at Bates circulated a petition urging the college to reinstate Morey.

=== War years ===
During World War II, Morey served as an instructor at the U.S. Naval Air Station at Martha's Vineyard. From 1944 to 1948, Morey was the head coach at Marblehead High School.

=== Lowell Technical Institute ===
In August 1948, Morey accepted an offer to return to Lowell Technological Institute, where he had been a coach from 1916 to 1917 while the school was called Lowell Textile School. He was appointed in 1948 to the physical education department at Lowell and served as an assistant coach in three sports, including football. He served as football coach at Lowell until the school abandoned the sport in 1950. He also coached Lowell teams in basketball (1948–1959), soccer (1951–1958), and lacrosse (for five years). In March 1959, Morey announced his retirement from Lowell at age 70.

== Later years ==
In 1959, Morey accepted a position teaching history at Curry College in Milton, Massachusetts. He also helped with coaching the Curry football team in 1959.

In October 1963, the Hartford, Connecticut chapter of the College Football Hall of Fame nominated Morey for induction into the national College Football Hall of Fame. However, he did not receive a sufficient percentage of the total votes cast for induction. In November 1964, Morey was honored by the Gridiron Club with a dinner in his honor in Boston.

Morey lived in his later years in Oak Bluffs, Massachusetts on Martha's Vineyard. He died there in 1986 at age 96.

== Head coaching record ==
=== Football ===
Year	Team	Overall	Conference	Standing	Bowl/playoffs
Middlebury Panthers (Independent) (1921–1924)
1921	Middlebury	4–4			
1922	Middlebury	2–6			
1923	Middlebury	3–3–2			
1924	Middlebury	7–1			
Middlebury:		16–14–2			
Auburn Tigers (Southern Conference) (1925–1927)
1925	Auburn	5–3–1	3–2–1	9th	
1926	Auburn	5–4	3–3	T–10th	
1927	Auburn	0–3 (Note: Boozer Pitts coached the last seven games of the season.)	0–2		
Auburn:		10–10–1	6–7–1		
Bates Bobcats (Maine Intercollegiate Athletic Association) (1929–1938)
1929	Bates	3–3–1			
1930	Bates	5–2			
1931	Bates	5–2			
1932	Bates	2–3–2			
1933	Bates	1–3–2			
1934	Bates	3–3–1			
1935	Bates	3–4–1			
1936	Bates	2–4			
1937	Bates	2–4–1			
1938	Bates	2–5–1			
Bates:		28–33–9			
Total:		54–57–12			

=== Ice hockey ===
Record table
Season	Team	Overall	Conference	Standing	Postseason
Bates Independent (1929–1930)
1929–30	Bates	6–4–1			State champion
Bates:		6–4–1			
Total:		6–4–1			
