= Torbert Macdonald =

American politician (1917–1976)

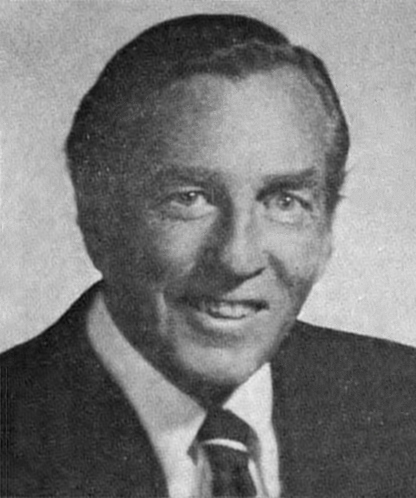
- Macdonald c. 1973

Member of the U.S. House of Representatives from Massachusetts
- In office January 3, 1955 – May 21, 1976
- Preceded by: Angier Goodwin
- Succeeded by: Ed Markey
- Constituency: 8th district (1955–1963); 7th district (1963–1976)

Personal details
- Born: June 6, 1917 Everett, Massachusetts, U.S.
- Died: May 21, 1976 (aged 58) Bethesda, Maryland, U.S.
- Party: Democratic
- Spouse: Phyllis Brooks (m. 1945)
- Children: 4
- Education: Harvard University (AB, LLB)
- Profession: Attorney
- Awards: Silver Star; Purple Heart; Presidential Unit Citation; Asiatic-Pacific Campaign Medal; American Campaign Medal; World War II Victory Medal
- Nickname(s): Torby, The Needle

Military service
- Branch/service: United States Navy
- Battles/wars: World War II

Torbert Hart Macdonald (June 6, 1917 – May 21, 1976) was an American Democratic politician from Massachusetts. He represented the northern suburbs of Boston, including his home town of Malden, in the U.S. House of Representatives from 1955 until his death in 1976. Macdonald was a close political and personal ally of President John F. Kennedy, his former roommate at Harvard College.

== Biography ==
Macdonald was born to Harriet (Hart) and John MacDonald in Everett, Massachusetts, in 1917 and grew up in Malden. After several years in public school, he entered Phillips Academy in Andover. Macdonald attended Harvard University, where he was captain of the Crimson football team and the roommate of John F. Kennedy. They remained close friends throughout their lives, with Macdonald serving as an usher at then-Senator Kennedy's wedding and as an honorary pallbearer at President Kennedy's funeral. At Harvard, Macdonald earned his B.A. in 1940 and his LL.B. in 1946 from its law school.

Macdonald served in the United States Navy as a PT boat commander in the Southwest Pacific theater from 1942 to 1944, and was awarded the Silver Star, Purple Heart and Presidential Unit Citation. He was admitted to the bar in 1946 and commenced the practice of law in Boston as a partner in the firm of Stoneman, Macdonald & Chandler. Macdonald was a member of the National Labor Relations Board for the New England area from 1948 to 1952, and he was a delegate to the Democratic National Conventions in 1960, 1964, and 1968.

Macdonald was elected as a Democrat to the 84th Congress in 1954. During his career, he served as majority Whip, and as ranking Democrat on the House Committee on Interstate and Foreign Commerce. He was often referred to as the "Father of Public Broadcasting", since he was one of the legislators primarily responsible for Public Broadcasting Act of 1967. He was also responsible for the "sports blackout bill" which provides for the broadcast of local sold-out sporting contests.

Another focus was his effort to reform campaign broadcasting practices, addressing his concern that competent candidates were being priced out of the process, and others were buying their way in. While recognized as an active legislator, he was also justly noted for his high level of service to individual constituents and their problems. His sharp wit and sense of humor garnered him among his Congressional colleagues the nickname "The Needle". He was reelected ten times, and died in office on May 21, 1976, in Bethesda, Maryland, aged 58.

== Personal life, death, and legacy ==
Macdonald married actress Phyllis Brooks on June 23, 1945, in Tarrytown, New York. They remained married until his death. He and Brooks had four children, the eldest of whom (Torbert Hart Macdonald Jr.) was President Kennedy's godson. The other children were Laurie, Brian, and Robin.

Macdonald died at Bethesda Naval Hospital (Bethesda, Maryland) after he had ordered doctors to remove life‐support systems. Macdonald was interred in Holy Cross Cemetery in Malden, Massachusetts.

The memorial stone dedicated to Torbert Macdonald was originally dedicated in 1984 by the Italian Heritage Society but moved to the Macdonald Stadium facility and placed alongside the memorial of Torbert's late father, John G. "Jack" Macdonald, for whom Macdonald Stadium was named.

Macdonald was portrayed by actor Stan Cahill in the 1993 television miniseries JFK: Reckless Youth.

== See also ==
- List of members of the United States Congress who died in office (1950–1999)

U.S. House of Representatives
Preceded by Angier L. Goodwin	Member of the U.S. House of Representatives from Massachusetts's 8th congressional district January 3, 1955 – January 3, 1963	Succeeded by Tip O'Neill (district moved)
Preceded by Thomas J. Lane (district moved)	Member of the U.S. House of Representatives from Massachusetts's 7th congressional district January 3, 1963 – May 21, 1976	Succeeded by Ed Markey
