= Linden School =

Linden S.T.E.A.M. Academy

Location
- 29 Wescott Street; Malden, Massachusetts 02148; United States; 42°26′2″N 71°2′3″W

Information
- School district: Malden Public Schools
- Superintendent: Timothy Sippell
- Principal: Rafael Angel Garcia
- Staff: 74
- Grades: K-4, 5-8
- Enrollment: 825
- Average class size: 20
- Student to teacher ratio: 12.5 : 1
- Colors: Blue & Gold
- Mascot: Tiger
- Nickname: LSA
- Website: linden.maldenps.org

Linden School is a public school in Malden, Massachusetts, United States with over 750 students.

In 2001, the school used a $250,000 Small Schools Grant from the Bill and Melinda Gates Foundation to divide Linden School into two autonomous schools. Half of the school now houses kindergarten through Grade 4 and the other, grades 5 to 8. Malden Schools Superintendent Joan Connolly told The Boston Globe that "there's good research to support the theory that kids learn better in smaller school settings."

Linden is a magnet school for Gifted Education and for Communications, Humanities, and Multi-Media. Admittance to the Gifted Education Program is governed by Malden Public Schools criteria, which include rubrics developed by teachers of the gifted program. Once accepted into the program, eligibility is reviewed annually. Programming and curricula are developed according to the students' academic talents.

The Communications and Humanities Multi-Media program concentrates on oral and written communications. Study of the humanities is used as a focus for teaching and learning in language arts, social sciences, geography, art, and music. The mathematics and science curricula are enhanced by integration of technology into all areas of teaching and learning.

The teaching of self-esteem at Linden was debated in a 2002 Boston Herald article. The school's 2001 participation in a research and clean-up effort of the local Town Line Brook watershed through the Saugus River Watershed Council was also profiled in The Boston Globe.

In 2011, principal Richard Bransfield proposed to change the Linden School into an innovation school. These changes took place at the start of the 2012 school year, and the Linden School was changed to the Linden STEAM (Science, Technology, Engineering, Arts, Mathematics) Academy, which focuses on project-based learning.

== See also ==
Salemwood
