= Warren McGuirk Alumni Stadium =

Venue in Amherst, Massachusetts

Warren P. McGuirk Alumni Stadium
- "The Junkyard"
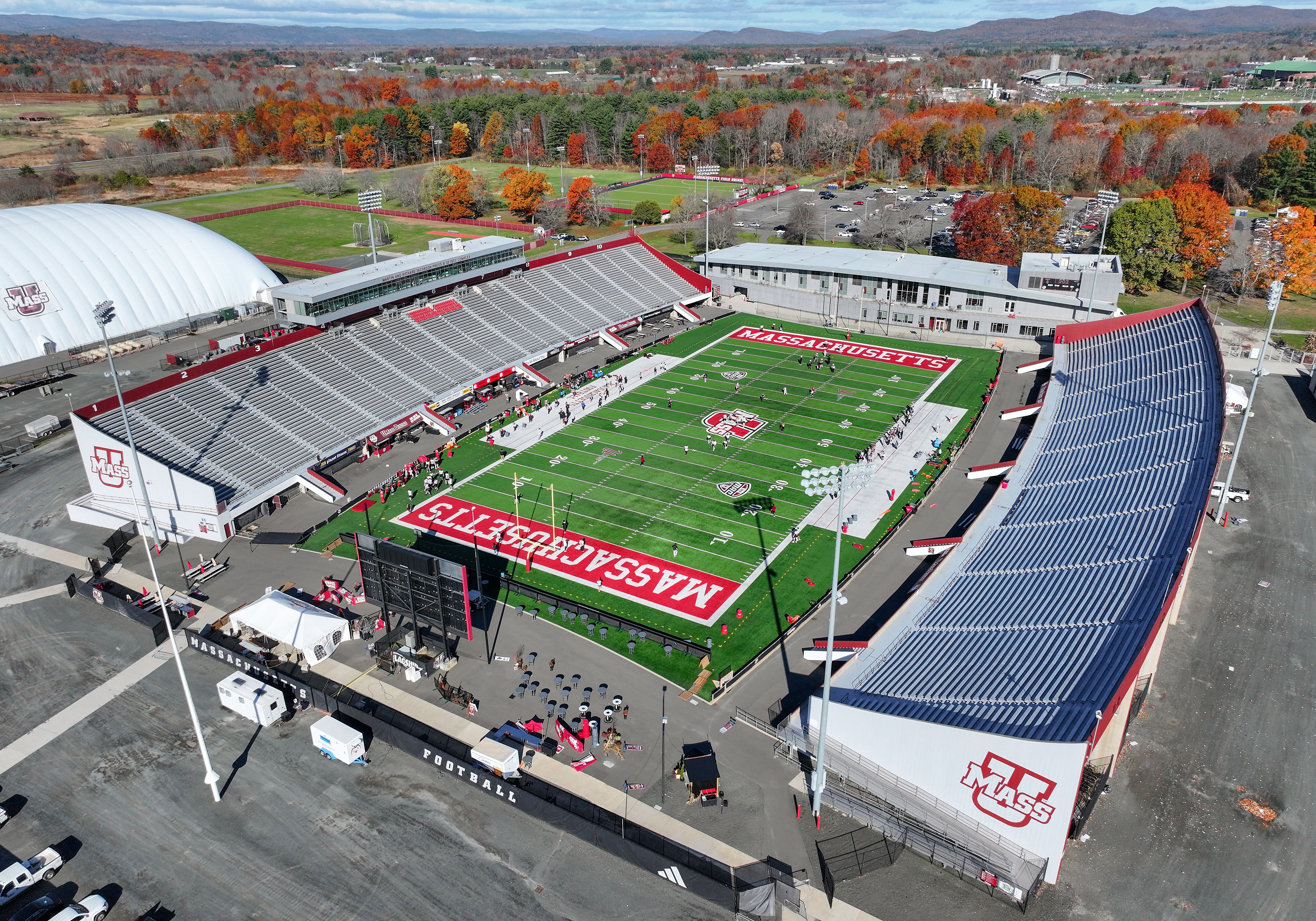
- Aerial view of the stadium

- Location in Massachusetts Location in the United States
- Former names: Alumni Stadium (1965-1984)
- Location: 300 Stadium Drive; Hadley, Massachusetts 01003
- Coordinates: 42°22′38.30″N 72°32′9.67″W
- Owner: University of Massachusetts Amherst
- Operator: University of Massachusetts Amherst
- Capacity: 17,000 (expandable to 21,430)
- Surface: AstroTurf RootZone 3DH

Construction
- Groundbreaking: 1964
- Opened: September 25, 1965
- Cost: $1.4 million
- Architect: Skidmore, Owings & Merrill
- General contractor: H.J. Madore Company

Tenants
- UMass Minutemen football (NCAA) (1965–2011, 2014–present); UMass Minutewomen lacrosse (NCAA) (2007–present); UMass Minutemen soccer (NCAA) (2020, select matches)

Warren McGuirk Alumni Stadium, is a 17,000-seat multi-purpose stadium in Hadley, Massachusetts, on the campus of the University of Massachusetts Amherst. It has been the Massachusetts Minutemen football team's home stadium since 1965, with the exception of 2012 and 2013, when the team played at Gillette Stadium in Foxborough. From 2014 to 2018, the Minutemen split their home dates between McGuirk and Gillette.

Originally known as Alumni Stadium, the facility was renamed in 1984 to honor Warren McGuirk, who was the UMass athletic director from 1948 to 1971. Although it is on the university's campus, which is almost entirely in Amherst, the stadium itself lies just across the town line in Hadley.

== History ==
By 1960, the growth of the University and its burgeoning football program made the construction of a new sports facility a top priority. From the beginning, the stadium was conceived as a multi-purpose facility which could be used for other sports as well as for ceremonial occasions. A sweeping concrete structure whose bold curves and open space express and exploit the vocabulary of its material, McGuirk Stadium was the first major concrete stadium to be built in the Northeast since 1920. One unusual feature is its raised design: the lowest seats in the stands are more than 12 feet (3.7 m) off the ground.

Replacing Alumni Field, the stadium hosted its first game on September 25, 1965, with UMass beating American International College, 41–0. The stadium was officially dedicated on October 16, 1965, when UMass defeated Rhode Island, 30–7, in a homecoming contest. The first sellout came on November 6, 1965, as Massachusetts hosted Holy Cross in front of 17,400 spectators. On November 25, 1972, McGuirk held its largest attendance of 20,000 for the Massachusetts win over Boston College, 28-7. The most recent sellout at the stadium was on September 27, 2014, with a shootout loss against MAC foe Bowling Green, 47–42. The stadium is also the site of UMass Amherst graduation ceremonies, and hosted the 1987 NCAA women's soccer championship. On April 10, 2009, an Amherst resident fell from the stadium in what police believe was a suicide.

UMass now plays in the Football Bowl Subdivision (FBS). McGuirk Stadium's current capacity is only modestly above the NCAA's former requirement of 15,000 average attendance for FBS membership. The school upgraded its press box to meet NCAA requirements to bring some games back to campus, and upgraded its indoor training facilities.

== Improvements ==
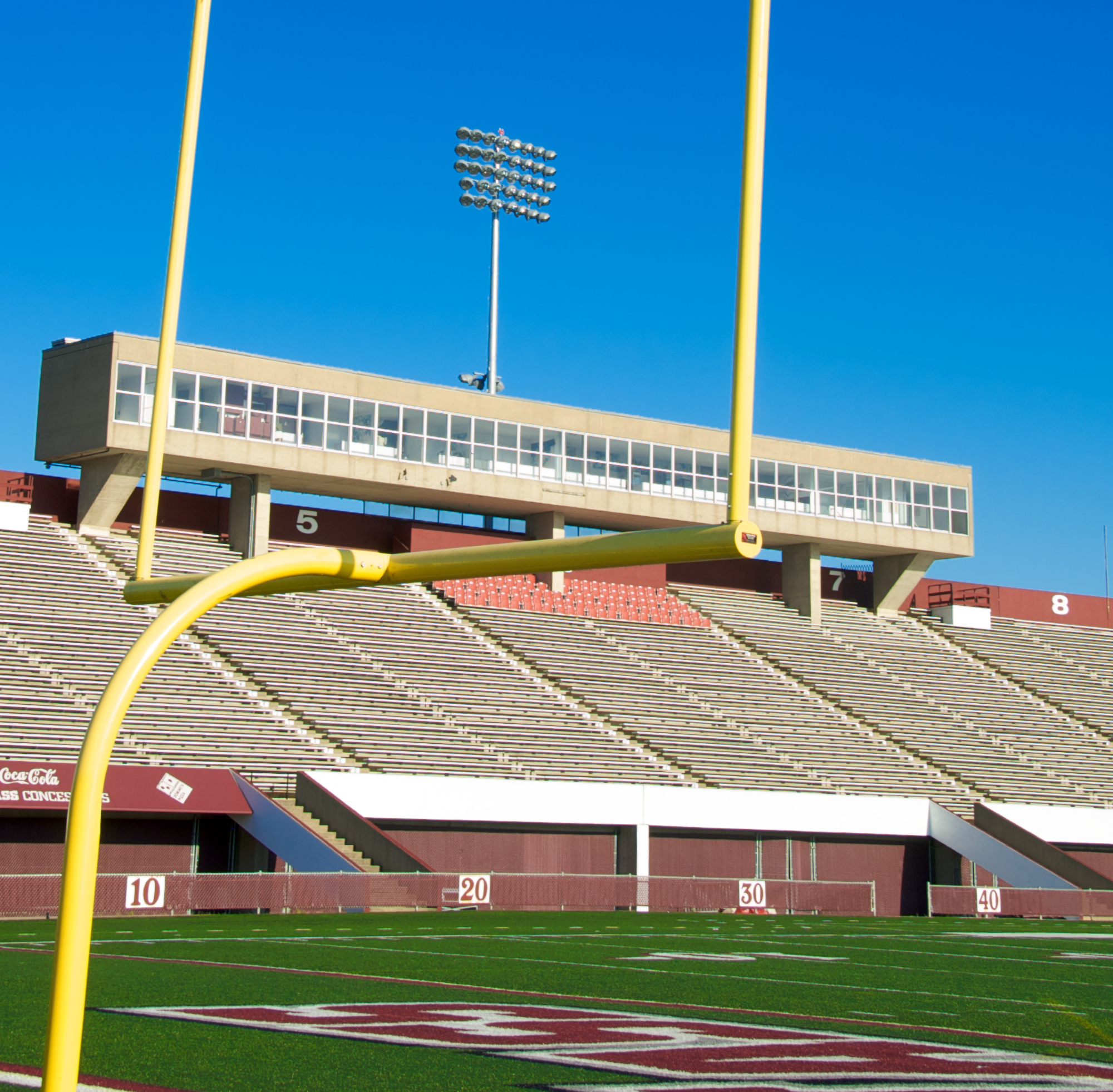
McGuirk Stadium's permanent lights, installed August 2008

Lights were installed in the stadium for the 2008 football season, permitting UMass to play night games at home on a regular basis. The first game played under the permanent lights was the season opener on August 30, 2008, with UMass beating Albany 28-16. A video scoreboard was installed during the 2009 season. A new FieldTurf playing surface was installed in McGuirk Stadium for the 2014 football season.

The plaza on the east side of the stadium behind the ticket gates, MinuteFan Park, hosts food and souvenir vendors and other exhibitors on game days.

On April 20, 2011, the school officially accepted an invitation to become a football-only member of the Division I FBS Mid-American Conference. McGuirk Stadium was not considered suitable for FBS football, however. It would have been prohibitively difficult to meet the minimum FBS attendance of 15,000 fans per game, and its press box and replay facilities were well below MAC standards.

Consequently, the 2011 season was the last at McGuirk Stadium before a major renovation project to upgrade it to FBS standards. For the 2012 and 2013 seasons, the Minutemen played all of their home games at the New England Patriots' home field, Gillette Stadium in Foxborough, 95 miles (153 km) east of UMass on the other side of the state.

The renovation added a new training facility and locker rooms on the stadium's north end, called the Football Performance Center. The old press box was demolished, with a new box constructed to two levels with more TV and radio booths and added luxury suites. The cost of this construction was estimated at $20 million and was completed in time for the 2014 season at a cost of $34.5 million. Coaching staff and players took occupancy of the Football Performance Center in July 2014.

The deal with Gillette Stadium called for UMass to play several games per year in Foxborough from 2014 through 2016, and left open the possibility for some games to be played on campus at McGuirk Stadium. One of the main reasons for this deal was the MAC's TV contract with ESPN typically scheduled a handful of MAC games to be played on Tuesday nights in October and November. If UMass were scheduled a home matchup for one of the weeknight games, the game could be played on campus, negating the need to bus students approximately 100 miles to and from Gillette Stadium late on a school night.

In a 2012 email to the Maroon Musket, an independent magazine covering Minutemen football, athletic director John McCutcheon said once the new facilities are complete, the team intends to play at least one game at McGuirk Stadium until the license to play in Foxborough expired at the end of the 2016 season. McCutcheon also said that there were no plans to expand the stadium, although it would be the smallest stadium in the MAC and the second-smallest in FBS.

Although no plans to expand McGuirk had been formally announced, McCutcheon said in 2011 that "The seating expansion will involve lowering the ground level of the field, and adding 14 new rows of seating in the area created by the sunken turf."

On September 14, 2012, the UMass trustees approved a five-year, $3.1 billion capital plan. Included in the plan was $30 million to be spent renovating the stadium as part of the transition to FBS football play. Although construction on the renovations began in March 2013, an official groundbreaking ceremony was held on April 26, 2013, and completed in time for the 2014 season.

In the summer of 2013, UMass secured the services of Perkins+Will to study various stadium expansion options to increase seating capacity; improve the overall structure and site amenities; and enhance the fan experience with improved concessions, restrooms, and fanfare amenities.

The project team, consisting of Perkins+Will, UMass Athletics, UMass senior administration, and members of the Design & Construction Department, met over the course of four design charrettes to develop a series of improvement projects and build-out options for the existing stadium seating bowl and support facilities. The report was completed in the summer of 2013. Projects identified in the report included upgrading the existing stadium structure to improve accessibility; new restroom and concession areas support existing and increased seating capacities; addition of clubs and suites; south end zone seating; and the addition of an upper east grandstand seating structure. These improvements supported a stadium in the range of 30,000 to 35,000 seats. The combination of projects were studied with the existing east seating bowl left in place and renovated to current codes and the demolition and reconstruction of the east seating bowl.

More recently, UMass secured the services of Perkins+Will to update the 2013 Stadium Expansion Study to support a stadium, required code improvements, and fan amenities in support of a stadium in the range of 20,000 to 25,000 seats with the ability to expand in the future.

In May 2018, UMass received a $5.58 million pledge from alumnus Martin Jacobson to fund experiential improvements to the stadium. The pledge provides the support necessary to design and construct a seasonal air-supported indoor structure and contribute to a high-definition scoreboard at McGuirk Alumni Stadium, among other planned fan experience facility improvements. Construction was slated to begin at the conclusion of the 2018 football season, with a formal timeline for completion to be established as the final scope for all the improvements within the project are determined.

On September 24th 2025, the schools AD Ryan Bamford announced an increased investment into the football program including a three-phase overhaul of McGuirk Alumni Stadium that will cost $25 million or more.

Following the 2025 season, the school launched Phase I of a multi-year, modernization of McGuirk Alumni Stadium. Phase I improvements include expanded ADA seating and accessibility enhancements, new LED ribbon boards and upgraded sound systems.

== Largest attendance ==
Rank	Date	Attendance	Opponent	Result
1	November 25, 1972	20,000	Boston College	W, 28–7
2	October 22, 1966	18,700	Boston University	W, 12–7
3	September 8, 1973	18,100	Holy Cross	L, 28–30
3	September 30, 1967	18,100	Dartmouth	L, 10–28
5	October 28, 1972	17,500	UConn	W, 49–16
5	October 26, 1968	17,500	UConn	L, 20–27
7	November 3, 1965	17,400	Holy Cross	W, 27–0
8	November 21, 1970	17,200	Boston College	L, 10–21
9	October 4, 2026	17,119	Eastern Michigan	L, 14–38
10	September 27, 2014^	17,000	Bowling Green	L, 42–47
10	December 2, 2006*	17,000	New Hampshire	W, 24–17

Notes: ^First game at McGuirk Alumni Stadium of team’s FBS era , *NCAA Division I-AA Quarterfinal

== See also ==
- List of NCAA Division I FBS football stadiums

Preceded by George Mason Stadium	Host of the Women's College Cup; 1987	Succeeded by Fetzer Field
