= Myer R. Wolfe =

American urban designer (1918–1989)

Myer Richard "Mike" Wolfe (July 15, 1918 – June 25, 1989) was an American urban designer and founding member of the Department of Urban Planning (1961) and the Urban Design Certificate Program (1967) at the University of Washington. He focused on urban form, the town as an artifact, the urban design process, and comparative urbanism.

== Early years ==
Wolfe was born in Malden, Massachusetts in 1918 to Bernard Wolfe (1890–1972) and Esther Krawetz (1890–1969), both Eastern European Jews whose families immigrated to the US in 1907 and 1909, respectively. Bernard was a plumber and Esther was a knitter. Wolfe lived with his parents, his older brother and a cousin of similar age.

Wolfe graduated from Haverhill High School (c. 1937) and received a Bachelor of Arts in architecture from the University of New Hampshire (c. 1941). He joined the US Army Air Forces in 1942, serving in the Burmese-Chinese-Indian theatre of operations until 1945. He enrolled in Cornell University's Urban Planning Program and received a Master of Regional Planning degree in 1947, submitting his thesis The Current Toll Road Trend. Wolfe's first academic appointment was at the University of Kansas. In 1949, he moved to Seattle to teach at the University of Washington School of Architecture.

== Institution building at the University of Washington ==
At the University of Washington School of Architecture, Wolfe worked with architects Victor Steinbrueck and Richard Haag. With aid from colleagues, they created the College of Architecture and Urban Planning (1957–58), renamed to College of Built Environment in 2008, which helped formalize the establishment of separate departments of Architecture and Urban Planning (1961) and Landscape Architecture (1969).

Active in the Puget Sound region, Wolfe served on the Washington State Highway Commission, the Seattle World's Fair Commission, and carried out research on developing Seattle suburbs. He cooperated with Engineering Professor Edgar Horwood, an early contributor to the development of the digital and spatial US Census and founding member of URISA (Urban and Regional Information Systems Association).

Wolfe welcomed geographers, anthropologists, sociologists and economists as faculty in the newly formed Department of Urban Planning. He remained a traditional urbanist, focusing on the visual and formal dimension of cities. He opposed dividing the quantitative from the visual, writing A Visual Supplement to Urban Social Studies. He formed initial Urban Design programs in the US (c. 1967) that were independent from the established departments of Architecture, Landscape Architecture, and Urban Planning. The program welcomed students from these departments to enable collaboration for creating quality urban environments. In 1965, Wolfe started a class called the Urban Form, which remained core to the urban design and planning program.

Wolfe ended his academic career as the Dean of the College of Architecture and Urban Planning (1979–83). He stayed at the University of Washington until his death in 1989.

== Lectures and consultancies in the US ==
Wolfe shaped academic and professional organizations such as the Association of Collegiate Schools of Planning and the American Institute of Planners (merged into the American Planning Association in 1978). He advised the Johns Hopkins University Center for Metropolitan Planning (1972), graduate programs in urban design and planning at universities in Puerto Rico, Texas, Maryland, Hawaii, and Minnesota, and the US National Endowment for the Arts on Urban Design Education in 1982. He was a visiting professor at the University of Southern California in Los Angeles (1963–64). After retiring from the University of Washington, he became Acting Dean of the College of Architecture and Environmental Design at Arizona State University in Tempe (1986–87).

Wolfe consulted for public agencies outside of the Pacific Northwest. In 1966, he advised the housing and urban renewal administration of San Juan, Puerto Rico on strategies, policies, plans, and programs. Between 1973 and 1976, he consulted for the State of Hawaii Department of Planning and Economic Development, working on a demonstration program for the production of urban design plans. The plans addressed new housing development, commercial services, and transit systems, while avoiding displacement of small businesses and guaranteeing preservation of historic areas. This work led to the publication of an Urban Design Primer for Hawaii professional planners and elected officials.

== Sponsored research ==
Wolfe carried out major research projects focused on the Pacific Northwest; with small grants from the University of Washington Graduate School, he studied the urbanization. In 1960, he negotiated a research contract with the Weyerhauser Corporation, a major landowner in the Pacific Northwest, to study patterns of suburban land development in the Seattle area. Wolfe wrote about the changing responsibilities of urban planners and the importance of seeking continuity in urban form in the Journal of the American Institute of Planners. He published an article on wider suburban development in the British Town Planning Review, which helped secure a grant from the US Department of Housing and Urban Development in 1967. The 4-year grant produced Urban Design within the Comprehensive Planning Process, a guide for planners to consider new and old urban forms during plan-making.

Wolfe built on transportation work he began in his master's thesis with grants from the Washington State Legislature to develop criteria for designating highway scenic areas (c. 1962), and from the US National Cooperative Highway Program to assess local impacts of highway improvements. From the early to mid 1980s, two grants from the National Science Foundation led to assessments of vulnerability to earthquakes and mitigation approaches to guide land-use decisions.

Wolfe received a grant from the US National Endowment for the Arts for research on small towns (1970) and one Design Project Fellowship (1977).

== International activities ==
Wolfe received two Fulbright Fellowships for study at the Royal Danish Academy of Fine Arts in 1959 and the Polytechnic University of Milan in 1965. Between the late 1960s and early 1970s, he went to Western Australia to consult on the design of a new town prototype for a private consortium. In the early 1970s, the US Department of State sponsored Wolfe to help replan the central city of San Salvador, El Salvador. In the mid 1970s, he was part of a United Nations Advisory team to assess effects of a new expressway, including possible displacement of existing settlements, in the Metropolitan Area of Kuala Lumpur, Malaysia. In the late 1970s, the US State Department sponsored Wolfe giving lectures and seminars in Korea, Hong Kong, and Burma.

From 1967 to 1978, Wolfe was a consultant and senior research associate in the Urbanistični Inštitut in the city of Ljubljana, Slovenia (at the time, Yugoslavia). The project was a demonstration study of regional planning in the metropolitan area. It was sponsored by the US Department of State, the Ford Foundation, and their Yugoslav counterparts, and included advisors from several universities. In the last year of the project, Wolfe was a visiting scholar at the American Academy in Rome, Italy.

== Sketches ==
Wolfe left sketches of towns and cities, along with urban and suburban places, which he used to record his travels and document his studies. His sketches of small towns in the Pacific Northwest were intended to encourage local populations to preserve the integrity of their built environment. Wolfe sketched the emerging suburban development that he studied in the Seattle region. Some sketches were conceptual diagrams and plans, but most were perspective drawings of places he saw. The sketches were donated in original and digital form to the University of Washington archives.

== Personal life ==
In 1943, Wolfe and Rosamond Virginia Fellman (1924–2023), from Newburyport, Massachusetts, married in Broward County, Florida. They had two sons: Michael (born 1944), an architect, and Charles R (Chuck) (born 1955), who wrote about cities and former environmental and land-use attorney.

== Legacy ==
Documents regarding Wolfe's papers, lecture notes, building designs, urban planning projects, and sketches are held in the University of Washington Libraries, Special Collections Division Collection #3390.
