= Common Burying Ground at Sandy Bank =

Historic cemetery in Massachusetts, United States

- U.S. National Register of Historic Places
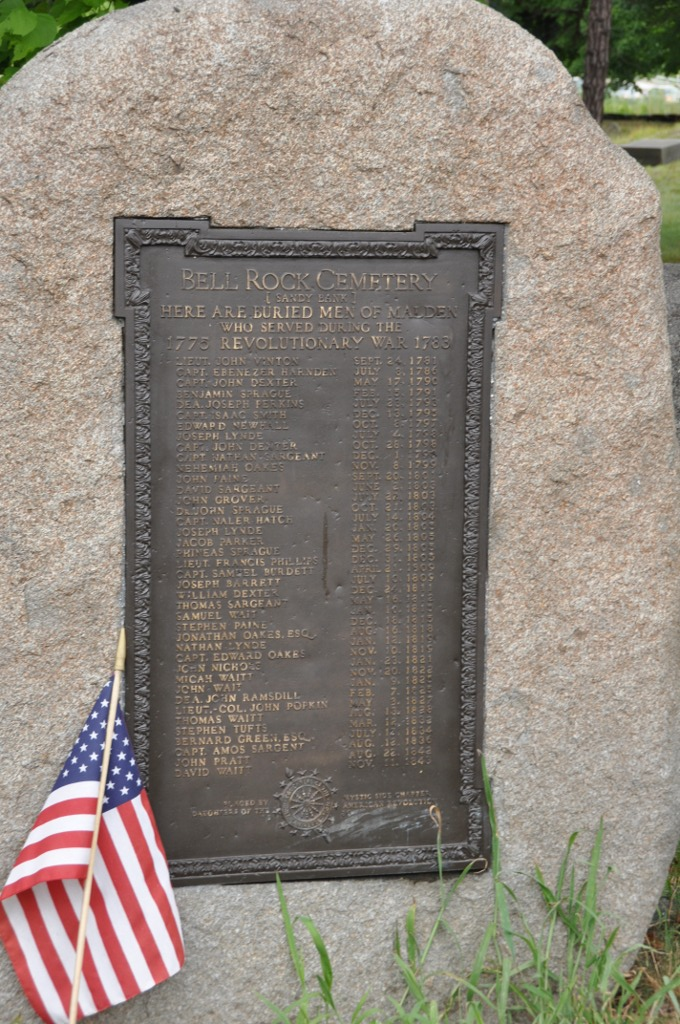

- Location within Massachusetts Location within the United States
- Location: Malden, Massachusetts
- Coordinates: 42°25′3.1″N 71°4′14.7″W
- Area: 3.3 acres (1.3 ha)
- Built: 1649
- Architect: Joseph Lamson; James Foster
- NRHP reference No.: 81000108
- Added to NRHP: August 27, 1981

The Common Burying Ground at Sandy Bank (officially known as Bell Rock Cemetery) is a historic cemetery in Malden, Massachusetts, US. It occupies a roughly rectangular parcel of land 3.3 acres (1.3 ha) in size, bounded by Medford Street on the north, Green Street on the east, Converse Avenue on the south and the Saugus Branch Railroad (now the Northern Strand Community Trail) on the west. It is the oldest cemetery in the city, established in 1649. Its earliest probable burial dates to that same year, although the oldest gravestone, that of Alice Brackenbury, bears the date 1670. The Malden Public Library, in its local history collection, has a multi-volume set of binders that contain alphabetically ordered photographs of every grave in the cemetery with the epitaphs on each gravestone transcribed below its picture.

The cemetery was listed on the National Register of Historic Places in 1981.

It is the final resting place of Michael Wigglesworth (1631–1705), a Puritan minister, doctor and poet whose poem, "The Day of Doom", was very popular in early New England and remained so for over a century.

== See also ==
- National Register of Historic Places listings in Middlesex County, Massachusetts
