= Malden High School =

High school in Malden, Massachusetts

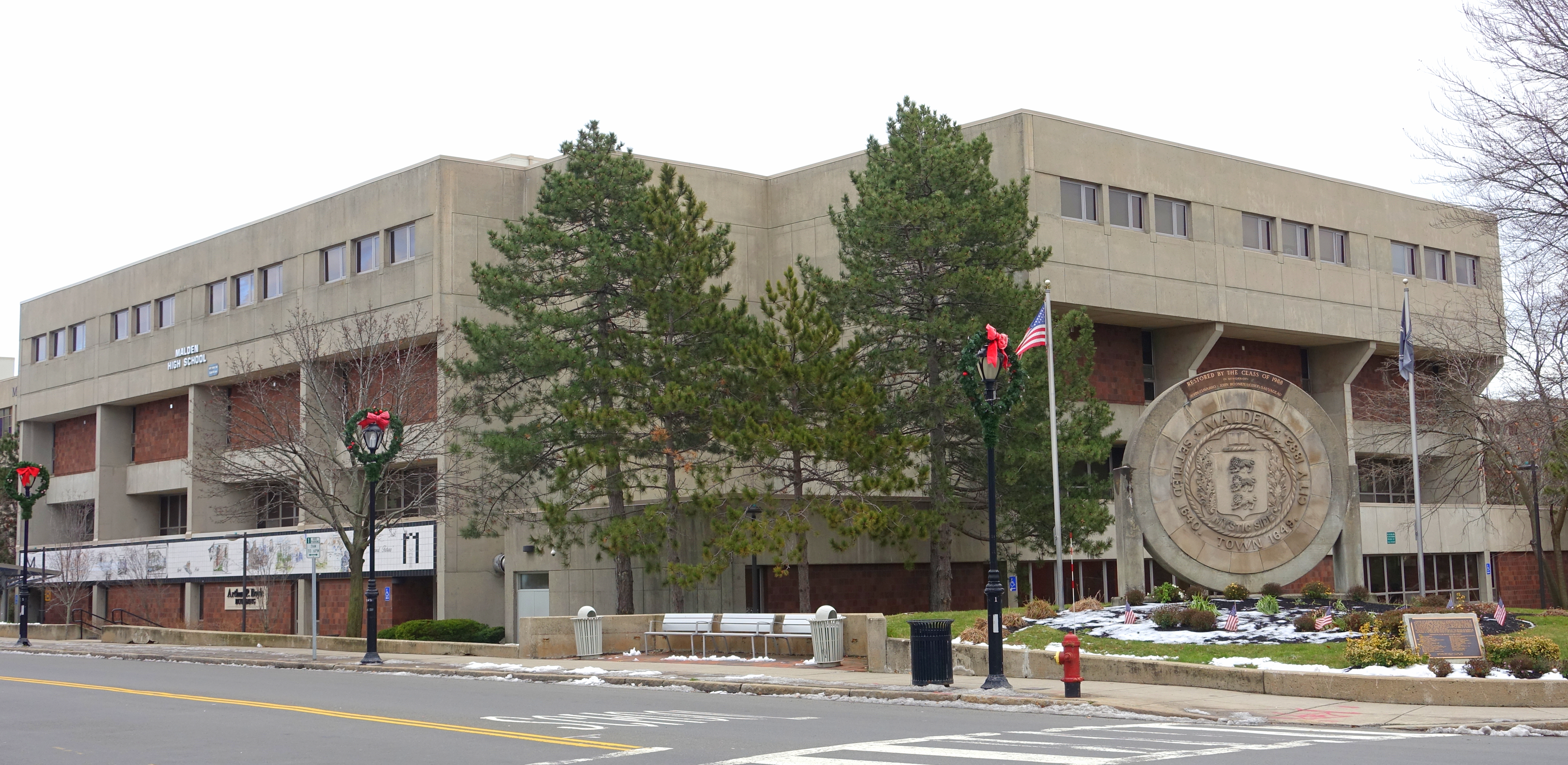

Location
- 77 Salem Street; Malden, Massachusetts 02148; United States; 42°25′38″N 71°3′54″W

Information
- Type: Public High school
- Established: 1857; 169 years ago
- School district: Malden Public Schools
- Superintendent: Timothy Sippel
- Principal: Michael Sabin
- Teaching staff: 118.28
- Grades: 9–12
- Gender: Coeducational
- Enrollment: 1,894 (2023–2024)
- Student to teacher ratio: 16.01
- Campus type: Urban
- Colors: Navy and gold
- Athletics conference: Greater Boston League
- Mascot: Nedlam
- Nickname: Golden Tornados
- Rival: Medford High School
- Accreditation: NEASC
- Newspaper: Blue and Gold
- Yearbook: Maldonian
- Website: maldenps.org/high

Malden High School is a public high school in Malden, Massachusetts. Established in 1857, the school is part of the Malden Public Schools and is accredited by the New England Association of Schools and Colleges (NEASC).

A 2013 study conducted by the National Center for Education Statistics found that Malden High was the most diverse public high school in Massachusetts.

== History ==
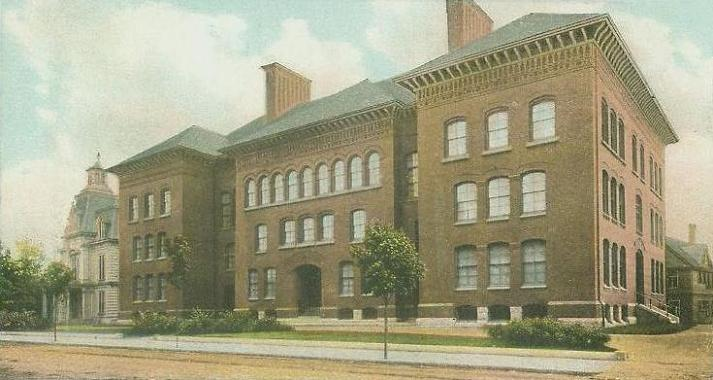
View of Malden High School in circa 1906.

=== Early years ===
Malden High School was established in 1857 by the school committee after a vote in favor for the establishment. The school first started in the Centre Grammar School Building of Pleasant Street with Joseph H. Noyes as Principal, Annie L. Woodford as his assistant and 38 students, which would later grow to 57 over the year. The school grew quickly taking the lower story of the townhouse two years later, started library on 1863, and faced increasing overcrowding until 1872, when Edward Hyde Rice was principal, and where a new building was erected on Salem Street at the cost of $100,000.

However, the first Salem Street building, after only a few years already became as overcrowded as the old school. The school was not designed for the future rapid enrollment as the school grew well into the hundreds. By 1892, three rooms of the Centre School Building were reopened to help serve the students as the Salem building became too overcrowded. After some debate, to accommodate the school's growing size, another new building was built and opened on 1896. The 1872 building continued as a manual training school until 1937 where the land was used for an addition to the high school that opened in 1940. In the following years of the 1950s and 1960s, the Malden High School reached its zenith as the school grew to become one of the preeminent schools in the state with wide praise and strong reputation sending many to the Ivy league. In 1958, the school saw 54% (13% higher than the state average) of its graduating class to continue on to college to 45 schools. This was especially impressive for a working class town in the late fifties. By 1968 the percentage of students accepted at colleges declined to 33% with only one Ivy League student.

=== Decline ===
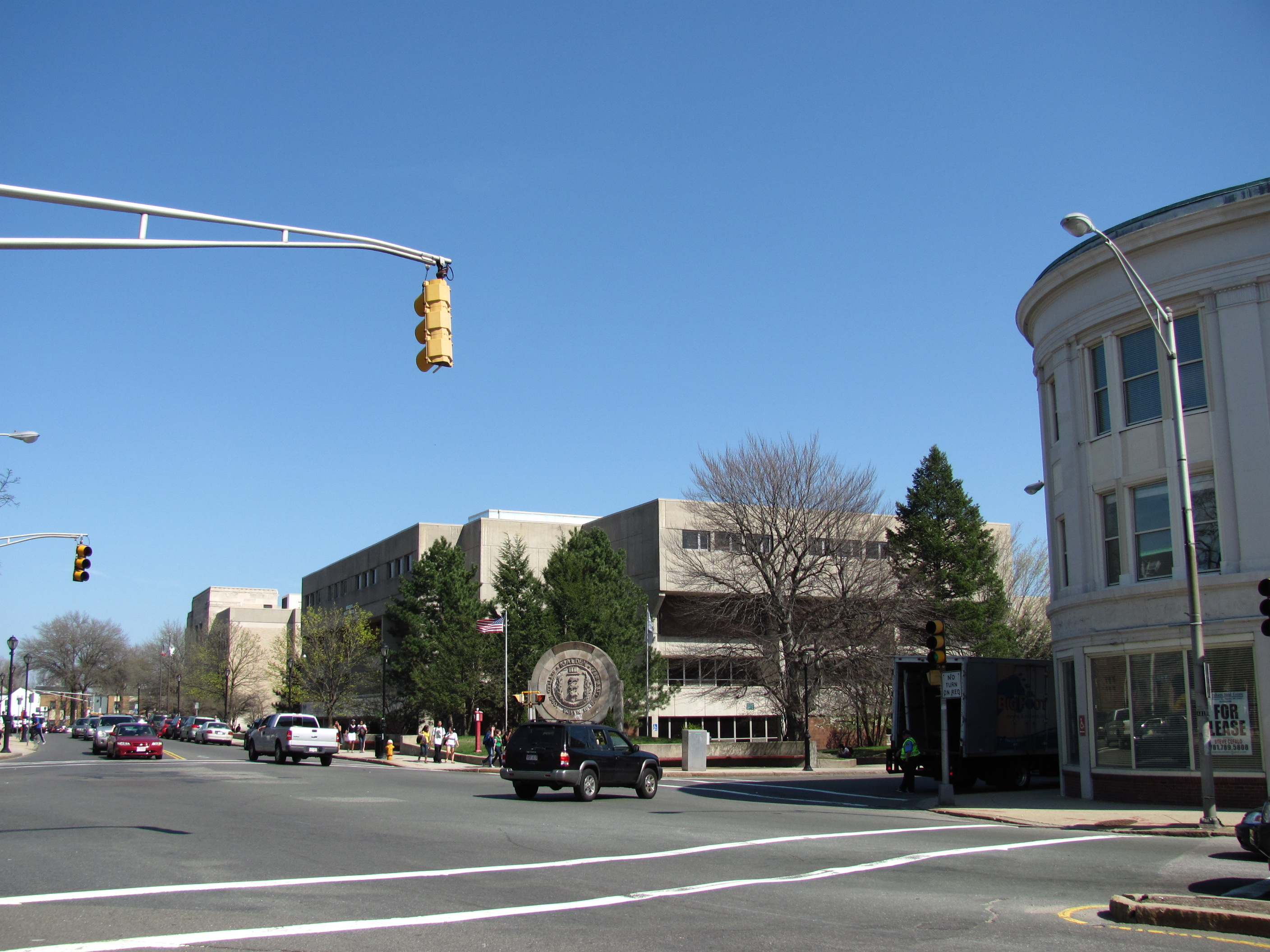
Malden High School

Malden High School entered into a slow decline in the subsequent years during the mid 1960s and through the 1970s. The school's College Board scores declined steadily over the decade, becoming well-below the national average in 1979. With the declining scores, the percentage of college-bound graduates dropped to 42% for the class of 1975 (while college-bound graduates rose nationally). Some students recognized the problem and asked the school committee to be allowed to take a heavier workload by taking more than five courses to be able to compete for college admission better. In addition, the school building began to show its age and marred the school with disruptive and behind-schedule repairs that even forced an early dismissal for a day. Construction for a new addition in the mid-to-late 1970s was riffled with delays and cost overruns from unexpected problems including discovering undetected peat and mysterious tunnels that needed to be excavated and filled with gravel. One of the new addition buildings was nearly torn down to start after the contractor ignored an error that one of the foundation footings were misaligned nine inches the correct line. After it reached completion in 1980, problems continued to persist well after construction including leaking roofs and even falling concrete. Adding to the decline, school vandalism reached extreme levels in the late 1970s with trashed bathrooms, ransacked classrooms, damage to the new school pool, and fires during the early 1980s. Teachers and the city began openly talking about the decline of the student body and disciple with rampant truancy, drugs, and alcohol with intimidation to more studious students. Finally cutbacks from funding (many blamed on the controversial proposition 2½) forced layoffs and cutbacks to many of the school offerings.

=== Recent years ===
Since the mid-1980s, Malden High School has become highly diverse with the minority now the majority. Its large diversity has grown to become a prominent feature of the school and was recognized during a speech in the 2007 graduation ceremony. The school since then has begun to recover and now beginning to receive new lockers, desks, computers, and other new equipment. The courses continue to expand breadth of its offerings with new courses including Mandarin Chinese and new AP courses. A comprehensive $77 million renovation to school buildings was completed in 2012. On April 7, 2022, a student was taken to a medical facility following an “altercation” with another student.

== Academics ==
Students have a choice of 15 advanced placement courses, provided they meet the necessary academic requirements. In addition, Malden High School students also have the option to participate in a Virtual High School program.

== Extracurricular activities ==
=== Sports ===
The school is a member of Massachusetts Interscholastic Athletic Association (MIAA). The school maintains a number of varsity teams including a swimming team, as well as baseball, golf, volleyball, soccer, basketball, gymnastics, lacrosse, softball, wrestling, tennis, track/cross country, and football teams. In addition, the school have a few upstart club sports teams looking to gain official recognition, the most recent sport to gain this was the girls' volleyball team. The Malden High School once featured a rifle team who competed against college teams and enjoyed several long running championship dynasties until it was shut down. The school's team name is the Golden Tornadoes with its mascot a lion named Nedlam. Malden High School, in conjunction with Medford High School, has the 2nd oldest continuous high school football rivalry in the United States, with the first Thanksgiving Day Game dating back to 1889. The crew team utilizes the nearby Malden River.

Notable coaches of the Malden High School football team include: Matthew W. Bullock (1905), Charles McGeoch (1931), and Warren McGuirk (1931–1941). Dave Morey, an alum of the school, coached the baseball team in 1919.

=== Clubs and activities ===
Outside of sports, Malden High School offers a wide variety of extracurricular activities. These include service clubs (including Key Club and Interact Club), ethnic cultural clubs( Haitian Club), activism clubs, interests clubs, and a number of others both fully recognized by the school and unofficial (clubs have to reach some notability and apply before full recognition and have to wait until contract negotiations before stipends are added).

The school's official newspaper, The Blue and Gold, had followed a long and proud tradition publishing for over 90 years making it the second-oldest running public high school newspaper. Over the years, it had won over many awards including 40 Columbia Scholastic Press Association awards, New England Scholastic Press Association (NESPA), and Suffolk University. The most recent award was received in 2010 for Best in News Writing from Suffolk University.

The Oracle is the second-oldest literary society in the country. In 2006 the society was given the ranking of "Superior," the highest possible rating, with only one other school literary society in the state.

Junior Varieties is the oldest high school variety show in the country. The variety feature yearly themes with a mix of comedy, vocal talent, instrumental performances, dance performances, and other skits. The show is largely led by the year's junior classmen, but students of all grade levels participate including their own part in the show.

== Notable alumni ==
- Wally Brown, actor
- John J. Buckley, politician
- Gary Cherone, former singer for Van Halen
- Kevin Cullen, journalist
- James DiPaola, politician
- Stephen J. Galli, pathologist
- Breno Giacomini, professional football player
- Norman Greenbaum, American singer-songwriter
- Olive Hazlett, mathematician
- Leo Kahn, co-founder of Staples
- Isaiah Likely, professional football player
- Kevin McGlinchy, professional baseball player
- Dave Morey, college football player and coach
- Sam Nichols, politician
- Elliot Paul, journalist
- Mike Road, voice actor
- Jason Rumble, professional wrestler
- Emma Fall Schofield, judge
- Louise Stokes, athlete
- Arthur Luther Whitaker, sociologist
