= Malden Public Schools =

School district in Massachusetts, USA

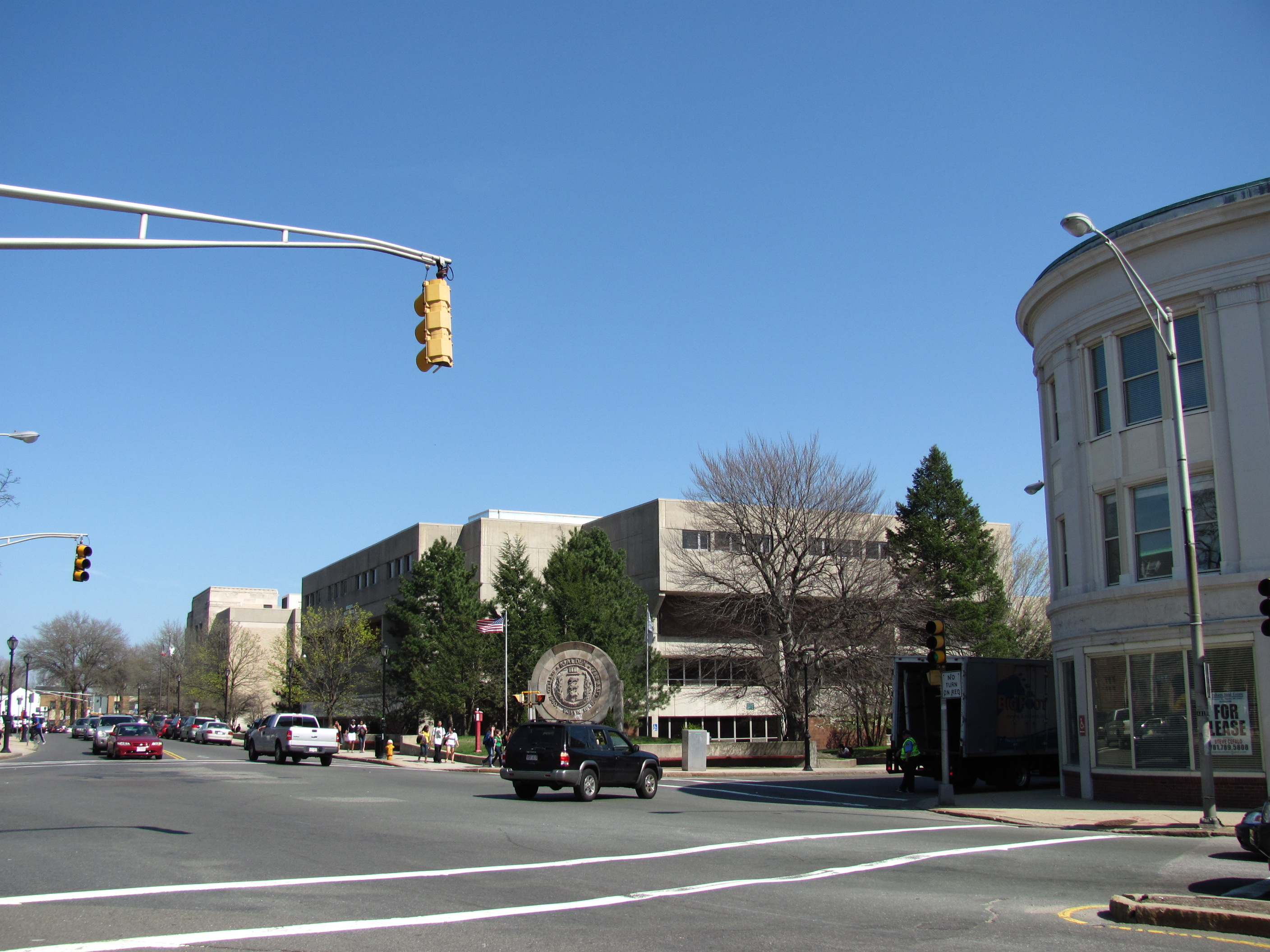
Malden High School

Malden Public Schools is a school district headquartered in Malden, Massachusetts in Greater Boston.

Dana Brown, the former principal of Malden High School, stated that one reason why the schools of Malden Public Schools often have test scores higher than those of other urban schools is because immigrant parents and their children, as paraphrased by Maria Sacchetti of the Boston Globe, "appear to be eager to seize the opportunities they are given".

As of 2009, almost 40% of students speak a language other than English in their residences, and 64% of students in the district are racial and ethnic minorities. In 1993, 28% of students were racial and ethnic minorities.

== Schools ==
- Malden High School
- K-8 schools:
  - Beebe School
  - Ferryway School
  - Forestdale School
  - Linden STEAM Academy
  - Salemwood School
- PreK: Early Learning Center
