= New England Scholastic Press Association =

A NESPA First-Place All-New England Journalism Award won by Malden Catholic High School's Crystal 99 in 1993.

The New England Scholastic Press Association (NESPA) is an association based in Boston University's College of Communication. Its goal is to promote all forms of student journalism, such as student newspapers, broadcast programs, yearbooks, and magazines. NESPA holds an annual conference, at which many awards are given out to student productions and faculty advisers throughout New England.

NESPA is an associate member of the New England Press Association. The current executive director of the program is Helen Smith. The association publishes three newsletters each year.
