= Malden, Massachusetts =

- City
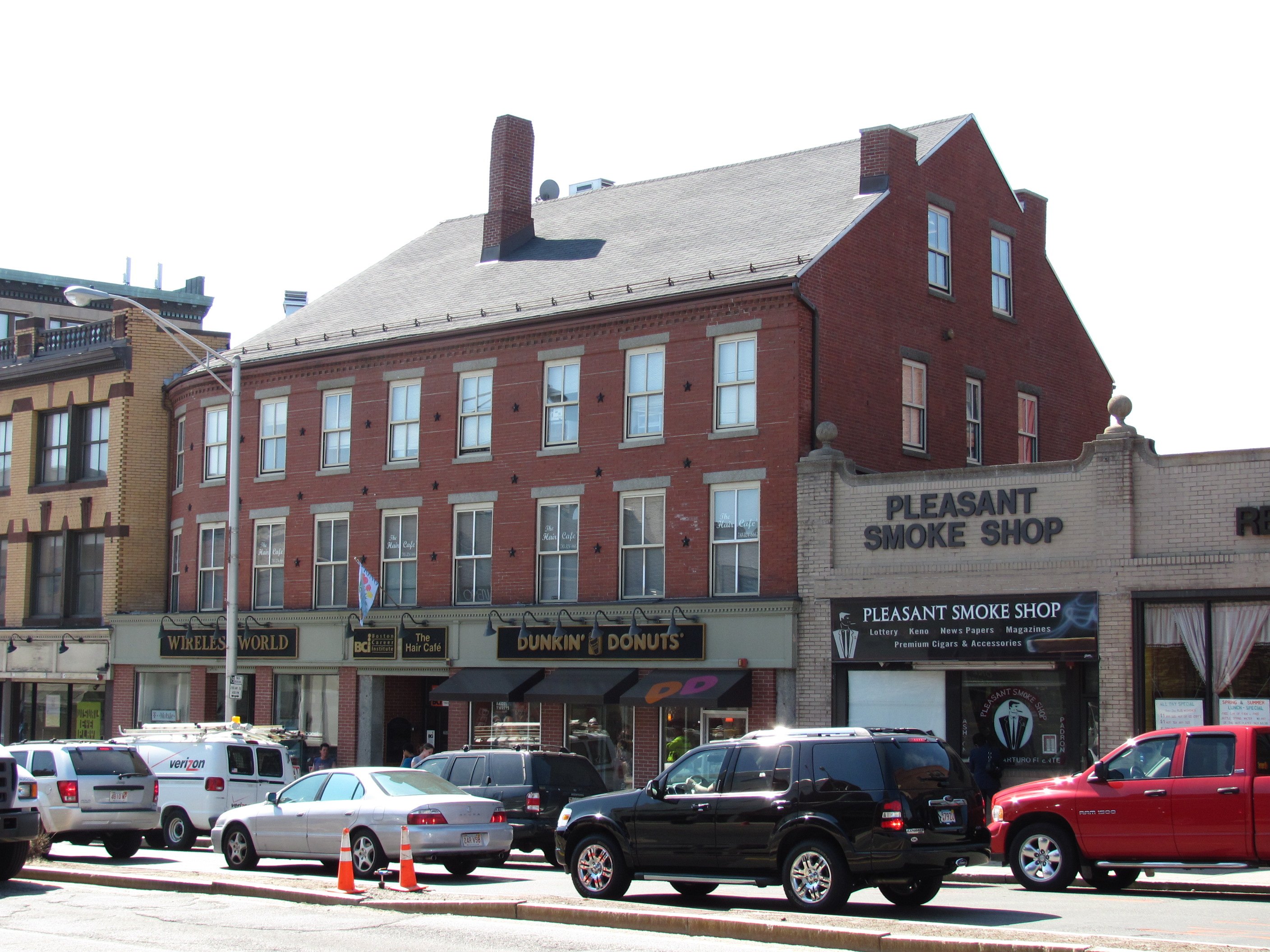
- Main Street

- Seal

- Location in Middlesex County in Massachusetts

- Location within Greater Boston area Location within Massachusetts Location within the United States
- Coordinates: 42°25′30″N 71°04′00″W
- Country: United States
- State: Massachusetts
- County: Middlesex
- Settled: 1640
- Incorporated: 1649
- City: 1882

Government
  - Type: Mayor–council
  - Mayor: Gary Christenson (D)

Area
  - Total: 5.08 sq mi (13.16 km^{2})
  - Land: 5.04 sq mi (13.06 km^{2})
  - Water: 0.039 sq mi (0.10 km^{2})
- Elevation: 13 ft (4 m)

Population (2020)
  - Total: 66,263
  - Density: 13,136.7/sq mi (5,072.11/km^{2})
- Demonym: Maldonian
- Time zone: UTC−5 (Eastern)
  - Summer (DST): UTC−4 (Eastern)
- ZIP Code: 02148
- Area code: 339/781
- FIPS code: 25-37875
- GNIS ID: 0612773
- Website: cityofmalden.org

Malden is a city in Middlesex County, Massachusetts, United States. At the time of the 2020 U.S. census, the population was 66,263 people.

== History ==
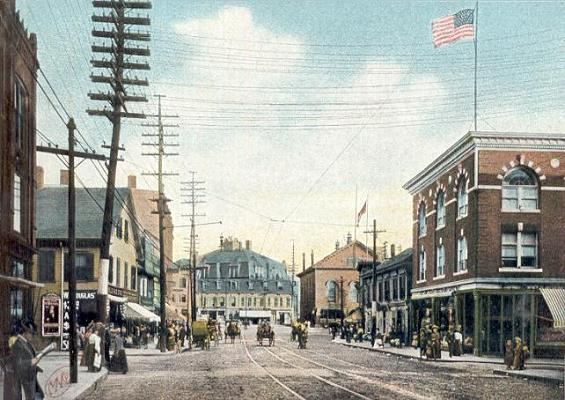
Pleasant Street c. 1906

Malden is a hilly woodland area north of the Mystic River that was settled by Puritans in 1640 on land purchased in 1629 from the Mystic tribe of the Pawtucket Confederation, with a further grant in 1639 by the Squaw Sachem of Mistick and her husband Webcowet. The area was originally called the "Mistick Side" and was a part of Charlestown. It was incorporated as a separate town in 1649 under the name "Mauldon". The name Malden was selected by Joseph Hills, an early settler and landholder, and was named after Maldon, England. The city originally included the adjacent cities of Melrose (until 1850) and Everett (until 1870).

At the time of the American Revolution, the population was about 1,000 people, and the citizens were involved early in resisting British rule. They boycotted the consumption of tea in 1770 to protest the Revenue Act of 1766, and it was also the first town to petition the colonial government to secede from the British Empire.

Malden High School has the second-oldest continuous high school football rivalry in the United States with Medford High School. The first "Thanksgiving Day Game" dates back to 1889.

== Geography ==
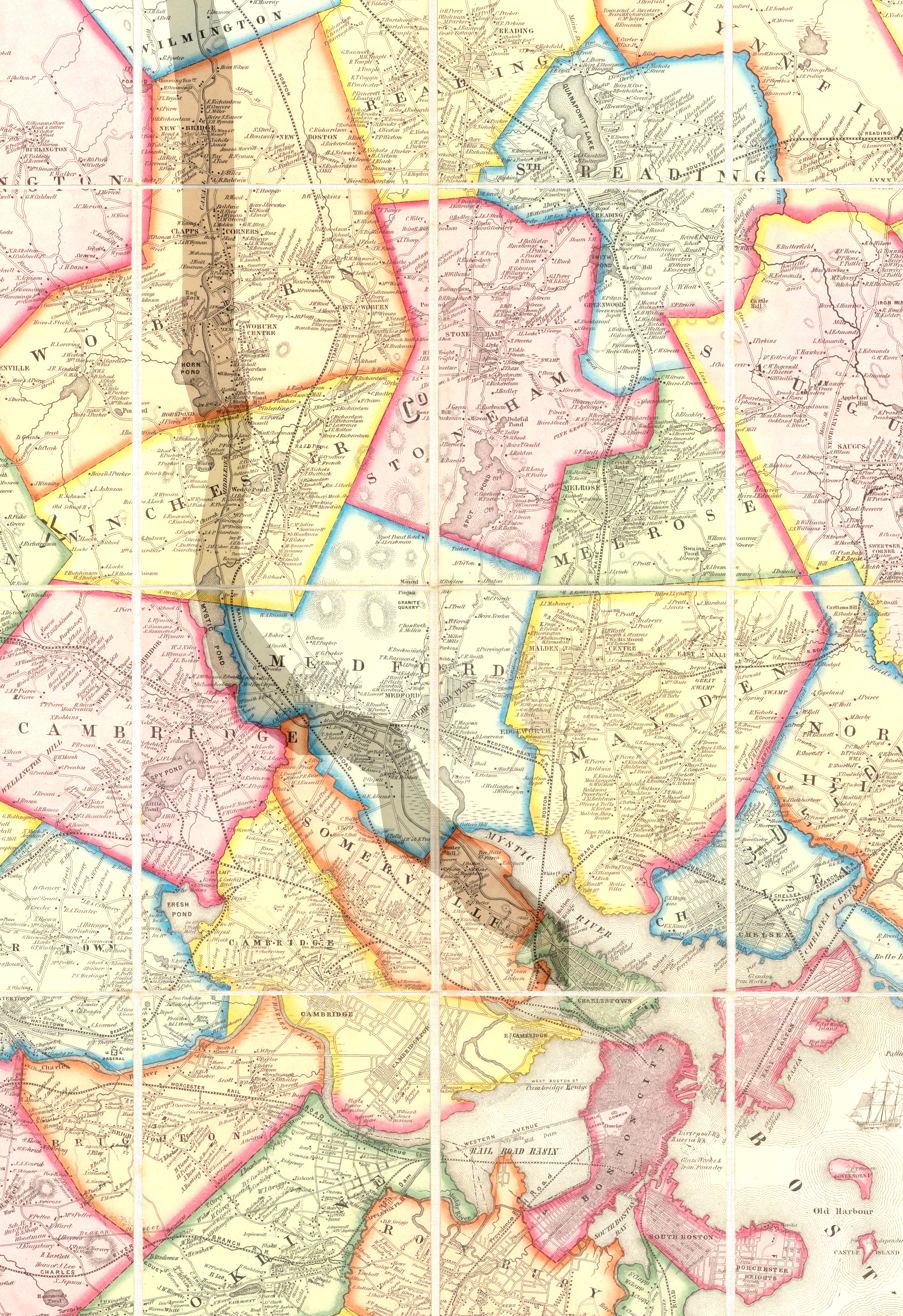
1852 map of Boston showing Malden

Malden is bordered by Melrose on the north, Medford on the west, Everett on the south, Revere on the east, and Saugus on the northeast. Boojum Rock, located in the northwest corner of Malden inside the Middlesex Fells Reservation, is the highest point in Malden, with an elevation of approximately 275 feet (84 m).

According to the United States Census Bureau, the city has a total area of 5.1 square miles (13 km^{2}), of which 5.1 square miles (13 km^{2}) is land and 0.04 square miles (0.10 km^{2}), or 0.78%, is water. Bordered on the northwest by the cliffs of Middlesex Fells, Malden is drained by the Malden River.

== Demographics ==
Historical population
Year	Pop.	±%
1790	1,033	—
1800	1,059	+2.5%
1810	1,384	+30.7%
1820	1,731	+25.1%
1830	2,010	+16.1%
1840	2,514	+25.1%
1850	3,520	+40.0%
1860	5,865	+66.6%
1870	7,367	+25.6%
1880	12,017	+63.1%
1890	23,031	+91.7%
1900	33,664	+46.2%
1910	44,404	+31.9%
1920	49,103	+10.6%
1930	58,036	+18.2%
1940	58,010	−0.0%
1950	59,804	+3.1%
1960	57,676	−3.6%
1970	56,127	−2.7%
1980	53,386	−4.9%
1990	53,884	+0.9%
2000	56,340	+4.6%
2010	59,450	+5.5%
2020	66,263	+11.5%
2024*	66,693	+0.6%
* = population estimate. Source: United States census records and Population Estimates Program data. Source: U.S. Decennial Census

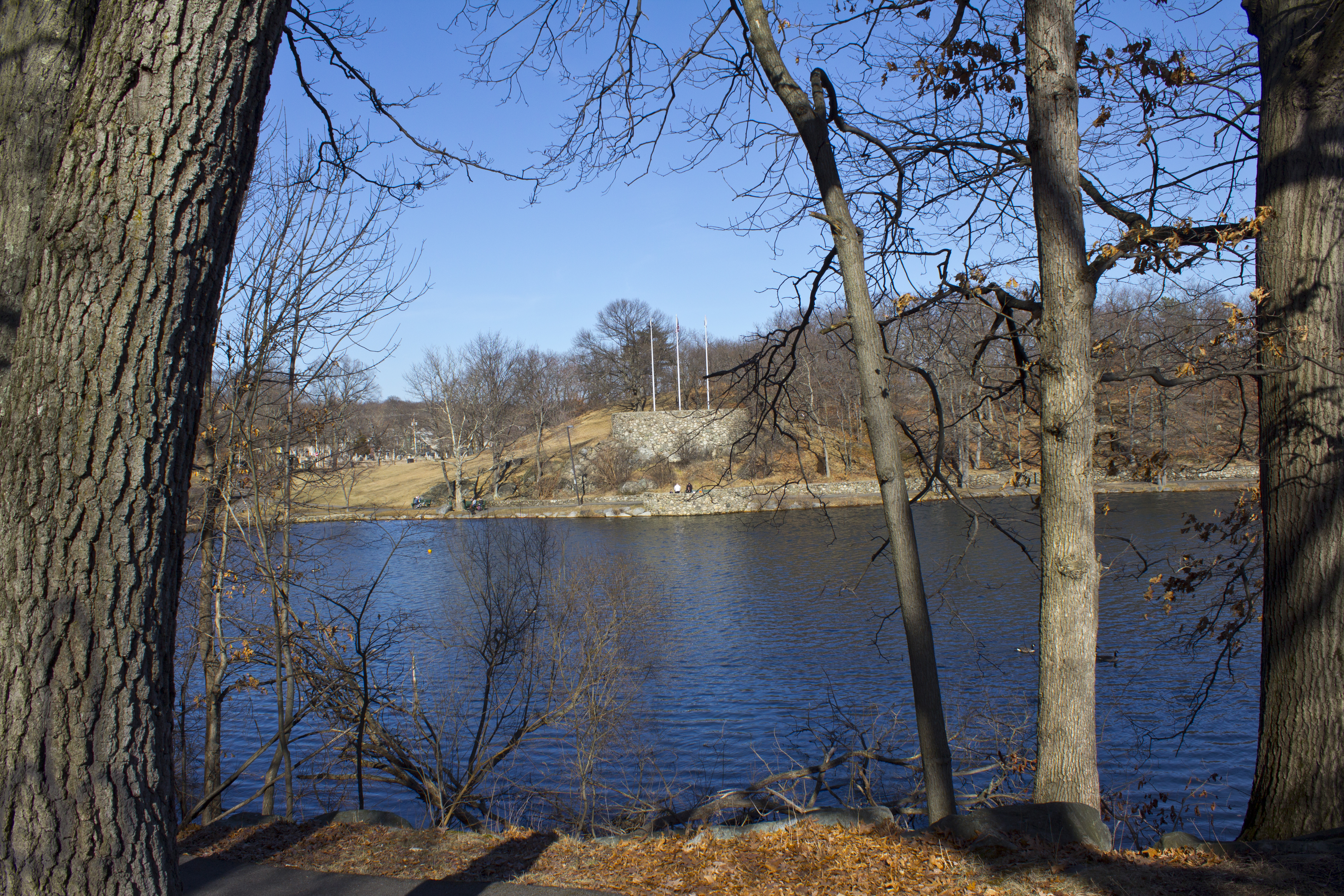
Fellsmere Park in 2012

=== 2020 census ===
As of the 2020 census, Malden had a population of 66,263. The median age was 35.7 years. 17.4% of residents were under the age of 18 and 13.5% of residents were 65 years of age or older. For every 100 females there were 98.1 males, and for every 100 females age 18 and over there were 96.5 males age 18 and over.

100.0% of residents lived in urban areas, while 0.0% lived in rural areas.

There were 26,024 households in Malden, of which 26.3% had children under the age of 18 living in them. Of all households, 40.2% were married-couple households, 22.4% were households with a male householder and no spouse or partner present, and 30.1% were households with a female householder and no spouse or partner present. About 28.1% of all households were made up of individuals and 9.7% had someone living alone who was 65 years of age or older.

There were 27,721 housing units, of which 6.1% were vacant. The homeowner vacancy rate was 0.8% and the rental vacancy rate was 6.5%. 47.2% were owner-occupied.

About 41.2% of the population was foreign-born.

Racial composition as of the 2020 census
Race	Number	Percent
White	27,463	41.4%
Black or African American	9,723	14.7%
American Indian and Alaska Native	215	0.3%
Asian	17,151	25.9%
Native Hawaiian and Other Pacific Islander	17	0.0%
Some other race	4,834	7.3%
Two or more races	6,860	10.4%
Hispanic or Latino (of any race)	6,891	10.4%

=== 2010 census ===
As of the 2010 United States census, there were 59,450 people, 25,161 households, and 13,575 families residing in the city. The population density was 11,788.6 inhabitants per square mile (4,551.6/km^{2}). There were 23,634 housing units at an average density of 4,657.5 per square mile (1,798.3/km^{2}). The racial makeup of the city was 52.5% White, 14.8% African American, 0.1% Native American, 20.1% Asian (11.1% Chinese, 3.1% Asian Indian, 2.8% Vietnamese), 0.1% Pacific Islander, 2.1% from other races, and 3.5% were multiracial. 8.6% of the population were Hispanic or Latino of any race (1.8% Puerto Rican, 1.7% Brazilian, 1.5% Salvadoran, 0.9% Colombian, 0.7% Dominican, 0.5% Mexican, 0.4% Peruvian, 0.4% Guatemalan).

There were 23,009 households, out of which 25.4% had children under the age of 18 living with them, 42.8% were married couples living together, 12.3% had a female householder with no husband present, and 41.0% were non-families. Of all households 32.2% were made up of individuals, and 11.5% had someone living alone who was 65 years of age or older. The average household size was 2.42 and the average family size was 3.13.

In the city, 19.9% of the population was under the age of 18, 8.5% was from 18 to 24, 36.9% from 25 to 44, 20.8% from 45 to 64, and 13.9% was 65 years of age or older. The median age was 36 years. For every 100 females, there were 92.8 males. For every 100 females age 18 and over, there were 90.0 males.

The median income for a household in the city was $45,654, and the median income for a family was $55,557. Males had a median income of $37,741 versus $31,157 for females. The per capita income for the city was $22,004. About 6.6% of families and 9.2% of the population were below the poverty line, including 11.6% of those under age 18 and 10.2% of those age 65 or over.

=== Immigrants ===
As of 2010, 37% of residents of Malden had been born outside of the United States. This figure had doubled since 1990, and an increase from the 26% of foreign-born residents in 2000. Malden's proportion of foreign-born residents was the second-highest in Massachusetts, after Chelsea.

Recent immigrants have largely come from Brazil, China, Haiti, India, Morocco, and Pakistan. The Moroccan American Civic and Cultural Association is located in Malden.

Previous groups of immigrants included Italians and Irish in the late 1800s and early 1900s. Malden also received Jews who arrived escaping Europe before and after World War II.

=== Asian population ===
In 1990 Malden had 2,805 Asian residents, comprising 5.2% of the population. In 2000 this increased to 7,882, or 14.5% of the city's population, making it one of the ten Massachusetts cities with the highest concentrations of Asian residents. There were 4,504 ethnic Chinese people (57% of Malden's Asians), 876 ethnic Vietnamese, and 696 ethnic Indians. From 1990 to 2000 the Vietnamese population increased by 187% and the Indian population increased by 262%.

From 2000 to 2010 the Chinese population of Malden increased by about 50%.

Institutions serving the Asian community in Malden include the Immigrant Learning Center, which offers English as a second language classes; the Malden Asian Pacific American Coalition; a satellite office of the Vietnamese American Civic Association; the nonprofit multiservice organization Great Wall Center; and the antipoverty agency Tri-City Community Action Program Inc. In the 2017, South Cove Community Health center began building a new site in Malden to serve the growing Asian American population.

== Education ==
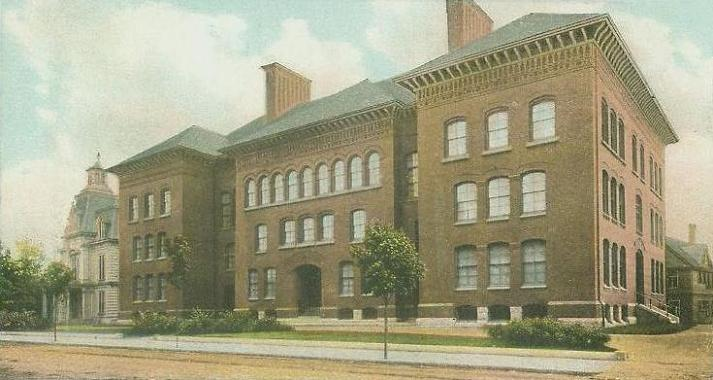
Malden High School c. 1906

Malden Public Schools is the school district. Malden has five public elementary and middle schools; one charter elementary, middle, and high school; one public high school; one Catholic high school, one Catholic PK–8th school, Cheverus Catholic School; and one public preschool. The elementary schools in Malden were replaced in the late 1990s with five new facilities: Beebe, Ferryway, Forestdale, Linden, and Salemwood. The city's three high schools are Malden High School, Malden Catholic High School and Mystic Valley Regional Charter High School. According to a study conducted by the National Center for Education Statistics in 2013, Malden High School was found to be the most diverse public high school in Massachusetts.

== Neighborhoods ==
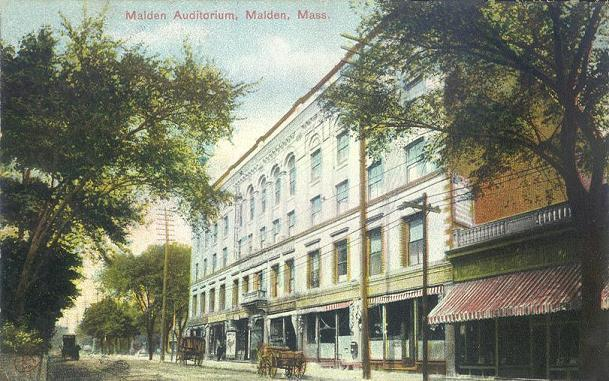
Malden Auditorium in 1909

Like many communities in New England, many towns and neighborhoods are organized around squares, which are located at the crossroads and town commons dating back from the colonial times and the early 19th century. Many of the neighborhoods take their name and identity from the main square in their area.

Malden's squares include Malden Square (at Main and Pleasant streets), Converse Square (at Main, Salem, and Ferry streets) Oak Grove Square (at Oak Grove T Station), Bellrock Square (at the intersections of Cross, Main and Medford streets), Judson Square (near Ferryway School), former Suffolk Square (at Cross and Bryant streets), once the location of a thriving Jewish community, Maplewood Square (at Lebanon, Maplewood and Salem streets) and Linden Square.

Some of the neighborhoods in Malden include Faulkner (location of the former Suffolk Square), West End, Edgeworth, Linden, Ferryway, Forestdale, Maplewood, Bellrock, and Belmont Hill (located between Bellrock and Ferryway).

=== Bellrock ===
Bellrock is the south-central section of the city, bordered by Main Street on the east, Charles Street on the north, the Malden River on the west, and the Everett line on the south. It contains Bell Rock Memorial Park (listed on the National Register of Historic Places) and Bell Rock Cemetery (also listed), which contains marked graves dating back to 1670. Bell Rock Cemetery was called Sandy Bank until the establishment of the Salem Street Cemetery in 1832; it was then known as the Old Burial Ground for half a century until it was renamed in 1882. Also located in this area are the headquarters for New England Coffee.

=== Edgeworth ===
The Edgeworth neighborhood is the southwestern section of the city. It contains Devir Park, Pearl St. Park, and Callahan Park. The city's football stadium, Macdonald Stadium, is in Edgeworth. A school in Edgeworth is the former Emerson Grammar School. The Converse Rubber Factory and offices once operated in Edgeworth at the bottom of Pearl Street. This is the original home of the Converse "All-Star" Basketball Sneakers. Malden Catholic High School was originally located in Edgeworth on Highland Avenue. The school's football team played their home games at Brother Gilbert Stadium, located at Commercial and Medford Streets in Edgeworth. Immaculate Conception Grammar School was located in Edgeworth on the corner of Charles Street and Highland Avenue. Edgeworth touches Everett and Medford.

=== Maplewood ===
In 1847, Joshua Webster, president of the Saugus Branch Railroad, purchased 200 acres in Malden along its projected route. Here, he planned a residential development with wide streets and ornamental trees. Due to the hundreds of maple trees Webster planted, the neighborhood became known as Maplewood.

== Government and infrastructure ==
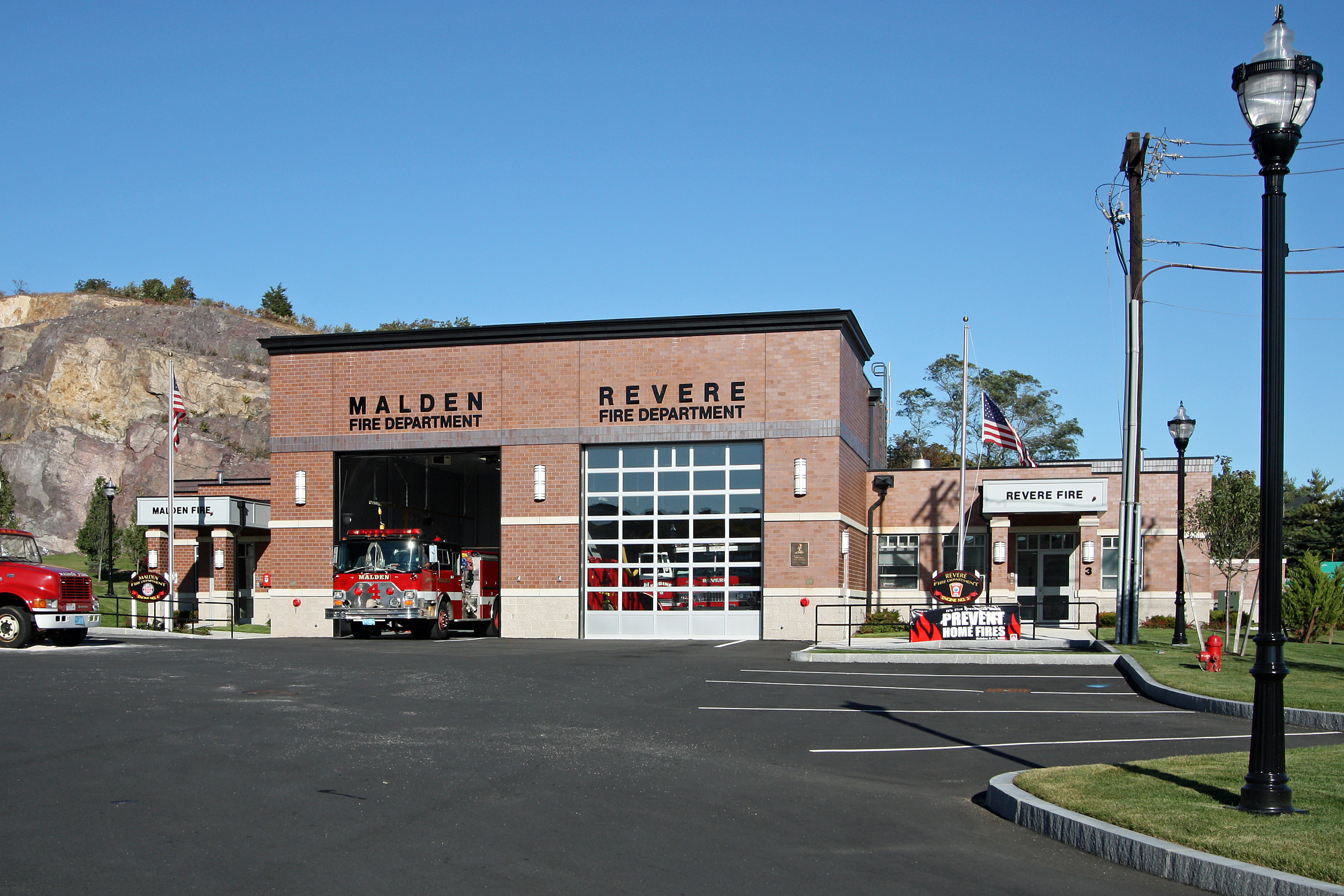
Fire Station #4, shared with the Revere Fire Department

=== Mayor and city council ===
The city government of Malden includes a mayor and city council. The mayor is elected to a four-year term. As of May 2021, the mayor is Gary Christenson. Christensen was most recently elected to this position on November 5, 2023 and his current four-year term expires at the end of 2027.

The Malden City Council has eleven elected members. Eight of these members are elected from the city's eight wards and are known as Ward Councillors. Three of the members, known as Councillors-at-Large, are elected city-wide. All eleven are elected to two-year terms. The city council elects from among its members an individual to serve as Council President.

=== Voter party enrollment ===
Voter registration and party enrollment as of February 1, 2025
Party	Number of Voters	Percentage
Democratic	11,593	31.57%
Republican	1,674	4.54%
Unaffiliated	23,248	63.11%
Other parties	324	0.88%
Total	36,839	100%

== Transportation ==
=== Major highways ===
One limited access route, U.S. 1, runs through the city, connecting Boston to the North Shore suburbs. Additionally, Route 28, Route 60 and Route 99 run through Malden as arterial routes. Route 16 and Interstate 93 are a short distance outside the city's borders.

=== Bus and rail ===
The city is served by the Orange Line subway that connects it to downtown Boston. The city's subway and commuter rail stops are Malden Center and Oak Grove. During the first few years of the 2000s, the MBTA updated signal systems and Orange Line service was replaced by shuttle buses at night. Since September 2007, such service interruptions have been limited to occasional weekends, while signal system repairs necessitated closing off the northern portion of the Orange Line and rerouting passengers via replacement bus service from either the Haymarket subway stop or Wellington Station.

There is a sizable section of the old Boston and Maine Saugus Branch Railroad line running across the middle of Malden. This line is currently owned by the MBTA, but has been out of use since 1993 and has not seen passenger service since 1958. The Saugus Branch Railroad has now been converted into a 10-foot-wide (3 m) multi-use trail known as the Northern Strand Trail (aka Bike to the Sea Trail) which opened in December 2012. A trail extension to the Mystic River / Encore Casino in Everett were completed in 2023, yielding a paved trail from the Mystic River in Everett to Western Avenue in Lynn. MassDOT plans to start construction in 2026 on a bridge to extend the trail across the Mystic River to Assembly Row and the City of Lynn and the Department of Conservation and Recreation are also building a separated bicycle lane through Lynn Common, down Market Street and the Lynnway to Lynn and Nahant Beaches. The Malden section of the trail features the "ArtLine" a series of murals and sculptures created through the efforts of Malden Arts.

Bus service to all adjacent communities is also available via the MBTA.

== Points of interest ==
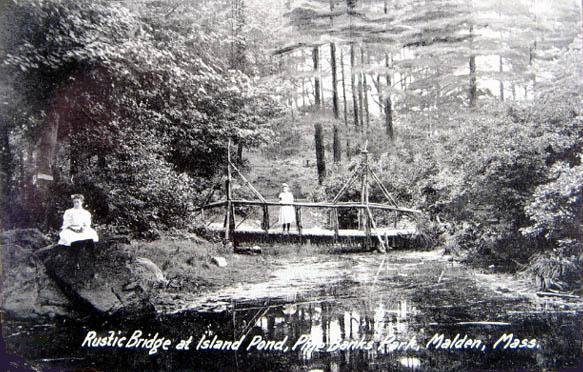
Pine Banks Park in 1908

Approximately 30 park sites throughout the city provide a variety of recreational facilities including tennis courts, basketball courts, playgrounds, and ballfields. Other sites include a 400-meter synthetic running track at MacDonald Stadium; 56 acres (23 ha) of the Middlesex Fells Reservation; the 25-acre (10 ha) Fellsmere Pond; a DCR-owned-and-operated swimming pool; a 30,000-square-foot (2,800 m^{2}) field house built under the new school rebuilding plan; the state-of-the-art Malden YMCA finished construction in early 2007; and Pine Banks Park, operated by a board of trustees with equal representation by the cities of Malden and Melrose. Waitt's Mountain is also in Malden.

Other points of interest include the Converse Memorial Library and the Congregation Beth Israel. One of Malden's finest and most notable landmarks is the public library which was designed by Henry Hobson Richardson and built in 1885. The initial construction of the library was funded by Malden's first mayor, Elisha S. Converse, who also funded its acquisition of an art collection.

== Notable people ==
- Johnny A., musician
- Mary Hall Barrett Adams, editor
- Jack Albertson, award-winning actor
- The Ames Brothers, singing quartet
- E. Florence Barker (1840–1897), first president of the National Woman's Relief Corps
- Harold W. Blakeley, U.S. Army major general
- Bob Barrabee (1905–1984), football player
- Reginald R. Belknap, military officer
- Ella A. Bigelow (1849–1917), author and clubwoman
- Walter Brennan, award-winning actor
- Philip Bynoe, Three-time Grammy nominee and Emmy Award–winning musician
- George Loring Brown, painter
- George R. Carey, inventor
- Gary Cherone, singer-songwriter
- Larnel Coleman, NFL player
- Elisha S. Converse, first mayor of Malden
- Kevin Cullen, journalist
- Albert DeSalvo, The Boston Strangler
- Timothy Dexter, businessman
- Gary DiSarcina, former Major League Baseball player
- Sheperd Doeleman, Astrophysicist and Director of the Event Horizon Telescope
- Ed Emberley, children's author
- Anna Christy Fall (1855–1930), lawyer
- Eugene Fama, Economist and Nobel Laureate
- Abbie M. Gannett (1845–1895), essayist, poet and philanthropist
- Erle Stanley Gardner, author, creator of Perry Mason
- Breno Giacomini, National Football League player
- John Gilgun, poet and novelist
- Ralph Goldstein (1913–1997), Olympic épée fencer
- Norman Greenbaum, guitarist, singer-songwriter
- Kyle Hanson, TV meteorologist, currently with Bay News 9 in Tampa, Florida
- Mary E. Hewitt (1807–1884), poet and editor
- Willis B. Hunt Jr., federal judge
- Adoniram Judson, first Protestant missionary in Burma
- Martin Theodore Kearney, California agriculturist
- Toni Kelner, mystery and urban fantasy writer and editor
- Keith Knight, cartoonist
- Killer Kowalski, former professional wrestler
- Ellis F. Lawrence, architect
- Fred A. Leuchter, execution technician and Holocaust denial author
- Torbert MacDonald, U.S. Representative
- Ed Markey, U.S. senator from Massachusetts
- James Montgomery, playwright and screenwriter
- Dodge Morgan the first American to sail solo around the world with no stops;
- Mark Morrisroe performance artist and photographer
- Sam Nichols, Secretary of State of Washington
- Nerlens Noel, National Basketball Association player
- Helen Nordquist, All-American Girls Professional Baseball League player
- Edna May Oliver, actress
- Daniel W. Owens, playwright, author
- Lawrence Palmer, Olympic gold medalist and ice hockey player
- Elliot Paul, author
- Marjorie Pierce, architect
- David Robinson, drummer for The Cars and the Modern Lovers
- Richard Rodenheiser, Olympic gold medalist and ice hockey player
- Dana Rosenblatt, former professional boxer
- Dan Ross, former National Football League player
- William Schofield, federal judge
- Harriette Lucy Robinson Shattuck (1850–1937), author, writer on parliamentary law, suffragist
- Will Sawin, mathematician
- Louise Kidder Sparrow, sculptor and poet
- Frank Stella, artist
- Louise Stokes, Olympic competitor and founder of the Colored Women's Bowling League
- Oliver Samuel Tonks, art historian
- John A. Volpe, former Governor of Massachusetts and U.S. Ambassador to Italy
- Michael Wigglesworth, preacher and author
- William Allan Wilde, member of the Massachusetts House of Representatives
- Myer R Wolfe (1918-1989), urban designer and university department founder
- Rufus M. Yale, prominent sailmaker in Boston
