= UConn Huskies men's basketball =

Men's college basketball team

| 2026–27 UConn Huskies men's basketball team |
- University: University of Connecticut
- First season: 1900–01; 126 years ago
- Athletic director: David Benedict
- Head coach: Dan Hurley; 9th season, 199–75 (.726)
- Location: Storrs, Connecticut
- Arena: Harry A. Gampel Pavilion (10,244); PeoplesBank Arena (15,495)
- NCAA division: Division I
- Conference: Big East
- Nickname: Huskies
- Colors: National flag blue and white
- Student section: Top Dogs
- All-time record: 1,895–1,032 (.647)
- NCAA tournament record: 77–34 (.694)

NCAA Division I tournament champions
- 1999, 2004, 2011, 2014, 2023, 2024
Other NCAA Division I tournament results
| Runner-up | 2026 |
| Final Four | 1999, 2004, 2009, 2011, 2014, 2023, 2024, 2026 |
| Elite Eight | 1964, 1990, 1995, 1998, 1999, 2002, 2004, 2006, 2009, 2011, 2014, 2023, 2024, 2026 |
| Sweet Sixteen | 1951, 1956, 1964, 1976, 1990, 1991, 1994, 1995, 1996*, 1998, 1999, 2002, 2003, 2004, 2006, 2009, 2011, 2014, 2023, 2024, 2026 |
| Appearances | 1951, 1954, 1956, 1957, 1958, 1959, 1960, 1963, 1964, 1965, 1967, 1976, 1979, 1990, 1991, 1992, 1994, 1995, 1996*, 1998, 1999, 2000, 2002, 2003, 2004, 2005, 2006, 2008, 2009, 2011, 2012, 2014, 2016, 2021, 2022, 2023, 2024, 2025, 2026 |

NIT champions
- 1988

Conference tournament champions
- ECAC: 1976, 1979 Big East: 1990, 1996, 1998, 1999, 2002, 2004, 2011, 2024 AAC: 2016

Conference regular-season champions
- NEC: 1925, 1926, 1928, 1941, 1944 Yankee: 1948, 1949, 1951, 1952, 1953, 1954, 1955, 1956, 1957, 1958, 1959, 1960, 1963, 1964, 1965, 1966, 1967, 1970 Big East: 1990, 1994, 1995, 1996, 1998, 1999, 2002, 2005, 2006, 2024

Conference division champions
- Big East 6: 1996, 1998 Big East East: 2002, 2003

Uniforms
| Home | Away | Alternate |
- * vacated by NCAA

The UConn Huskies men's basketball program is the NCAA Division I men's college basketball team of the University of Connecticut in Storrs, Connecticut. They play in the Big East Conference and are coached by Dan Hurley. With six national championships and 45 conference titles, the program is considered one of the blue bloods of college basketball.

UConn has won six NCAA tournament championships (1999, 2004, 2011, 2014, 2023 and 2024), which puts the program in a tie for third most all time and is the most of any program since the tournament expanded to 64 teams. The Huskies have won eight Big East tournament championships (tied for most all time) and 11 Big East regular season championships (most all time). UConn has 37 NCAA tournament appearances (tied for 11th most all time) and has played in eight NCAA Final Fours (tied for 8th most all time), 14 NCAA Elite Eights (11th most all time) and 20 NCAA Sweet Sixteens (11th most all time). UConn won the National Invitation Tournament (NIT) championship in 1988 and the NIT third-place game in 1997, with 13 NIT appearances in total. The Huskies also have one American Athletic Conference tournament championship and two ECAC New England regional tournament championships.

From the Huskies' first game in 1900–01 season to the end of the 2025–26 season, the program has amassed 1,895 wins and compiled a .647 winning percentage, both top 20 in NCAA Division I history. Initially a New England regional powerhouse, UConn won multiple conference championships in the 1920s, 1940s, 1950s, 1960s and 1970s, including a run of 10-straight Yankee Conference championships from 1951 to 1960. The Huskies appeared in the NCAA tournament 11 times between 1939 and 1970—second most of any school in the tournament's early era—reaching their first Sweet Sixteen in 1956 and first Elite Eight in 1964. The program began its emergence as a national powerhouse after becoming a charter member of the newly formed Big East Conference in 1979, building steadily from its first national postseason championship in the NIT in 1988 to its first NCAA championship in 1999.

Since 1999, the Huskies have won six national championships in a span of 25 years, one of the best runs in the sport's history. In 2024, UConn became the eighth school in NCAA Division I history to win back-to-back national championships, and the first to do so in 17 years. After the 2023–24 season, Fox Sports dubbed the Huskies' sustained success "the greatest run of the 21st century" and recognized UConn as "one of the greatest programs in the history of college basketball."

== History ==
=== Early history (1901–1946) ===
Connecticut Agricultural College played its first organized men's basketball game on February 8, 1901, a 17–12 win against Willimantic High School. The victory led the school to add men's basketball as a varsity sport the following year. The program's first intercollegiate game came in the 1904–05 season, a 66–22 loss to UMass. Connecticut did not have a home court during these early years and eventually ceased competition in 1908 as a result. An independent team was given permission to compete under the school's name from 1910 to 1914. Connecticut resumed sponsorship of men's basketball as a varsity sport in the 1914–15 season following the construction of Hawley Armory, the school's first on-campus basketball court. The Aggies, as they were called at the time, had no coach from 1901 to 1915 and posted a 1–4 record on the 1914–15 season.

==== 1915–1921: John Donahue and Ross Swartz ====
Looking to improve on its performance in the previous seasons, Connecticut named John F. Donahue as the program's first head coach in 1915. However, he led the team to four losing seasons and an 11–23 overall record during his tenure as head coach. Connecticut named M. Ross Swartz as Donahue's replacement in 1919. He posted a 7–5 record in his first year—the school's first winning season since returning basketball as a varsity sport—but finished 7–9 in his second.

==== 1921–1922: Wilder Tasker ====
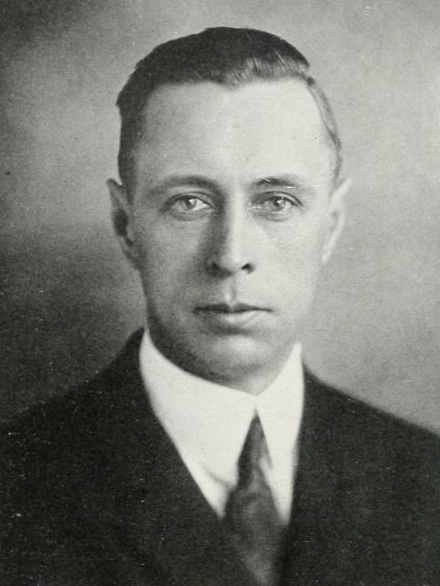
J. Wilder Tasker in 1924

With losing records in five out of the previous six years, Connecticut finally turned the corner when it named J. Wilder Tasker as head coach for the 1921–22 season. The Aggies played their most aggressive schedule to date, and opened the season with a 38–33 win against Harvard in Cambridge. In its second game, the team notched the program's first major upset, a 33–31 win over Army at West Point on December 21, 1921. Army was ranked No. 3 in the nation that season by the retrospective Premo-Porretta Power Poll. Connecticut finished the year 15–4 overall, the program's best season to date. Tasker returned for the 1922–23 season but abruptly resigned after the team's first game, a 52–19 loss to Army. He left Connecticut with a 15–5 overall record. Roy J. Guyer coached the remainder of the season, finishing 8–6 as interim head coach.

==== 1923–1927: Sumner Dole ====
Connecticut named Sumner Dole as head coach ahead of the 1923–24 season. After posting a losing record in his first season, Dole led Connecticut to back-to-back New England Conference championships in 1925 and 1926. The Aggies went 10-4 in the 1924-25 season. Hugh Greer was captain of the 1925–26 team. That season included a 30–26 win over UMass, a team ranked No. 25 in the country that season by the retrospective Premo-Porretta Power Poll. After the 1926–27 season, Dole stepped down as men's basketball head coach, but continued to coach the school's football team. He finished with a 34–22 record over four seasons as head coach.

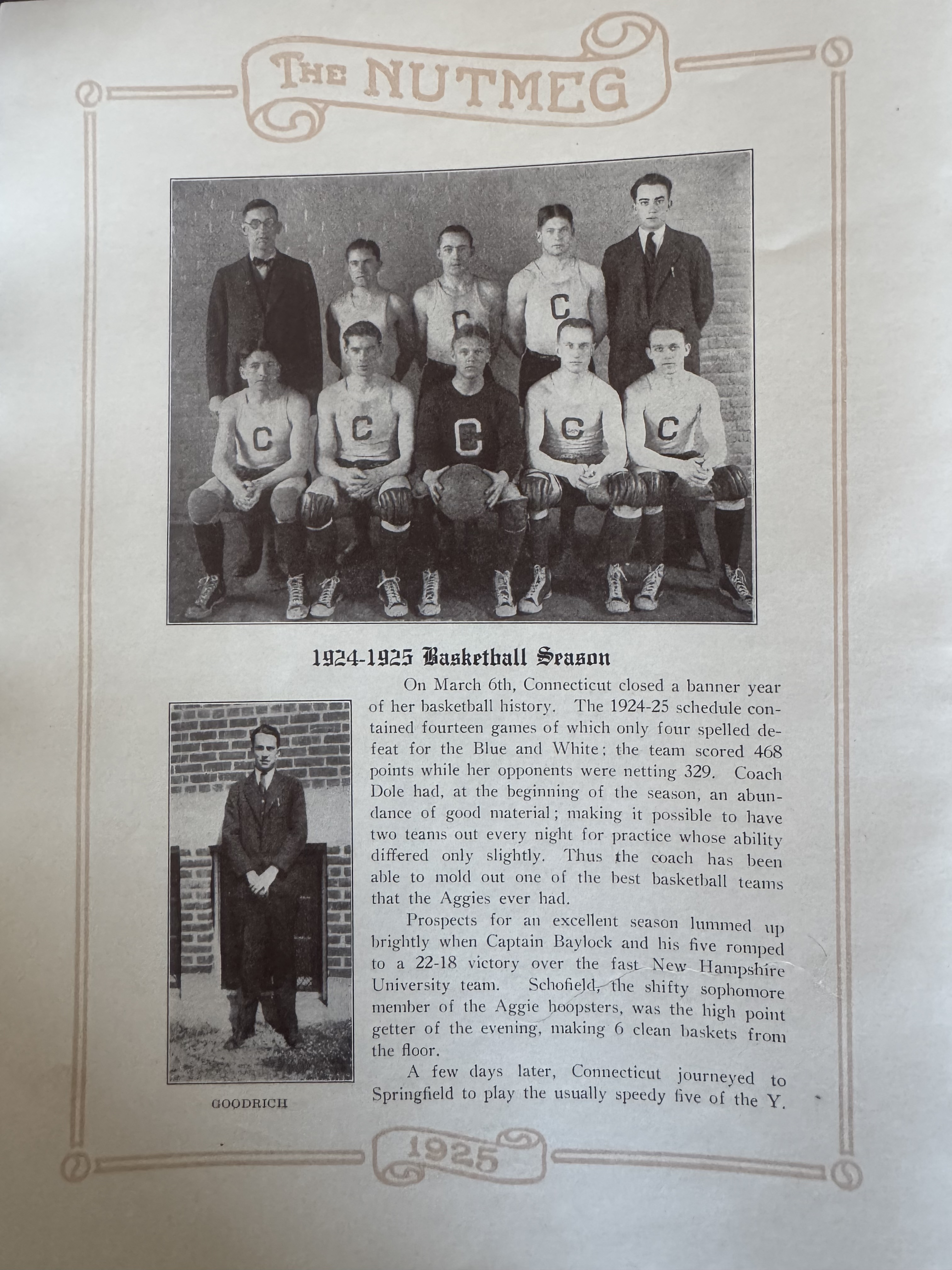
The 1925 Nutmeg Connecticut Agricultural College yearbook men's basketball entry with a team photo and a picture of the team manager, John W. Goodrich of West Hartford.

==== 1927–1931: Louis Alexander ====
With Dole shifting his focus to the school's football team, Louis Alexander was named Connecticut's first men's basketball-only head coach in 1927. In his first season, Alexander won the school's third New England Conference championship. That season included a 39–36 win over Springfield College, a team ranked No. 11 in the nation that year by the retrospective Premo-Porretta Power Poll. Alexander led the team to winning records again in the next three seasons before leaving for the University of Rochester in 1931. He left Connecticut with a 35–19 overall record. Dole, who was still head coach of Connecticut's football team, coached the beginning of the 1930–31 season while Alexander was on sabbatical, posting a 5–3 record as interim head coach and bringing his overall record to 39–25.

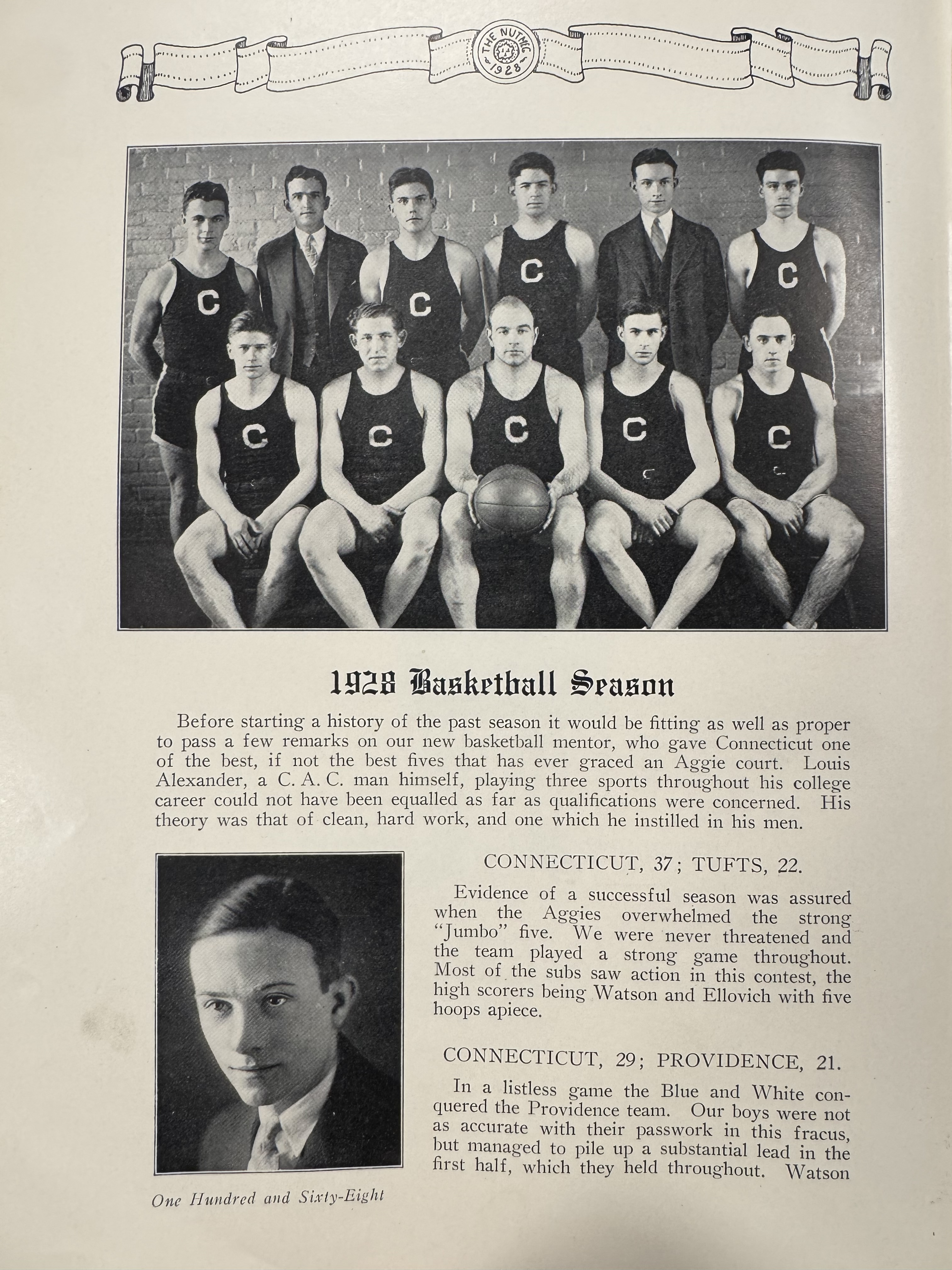
The Nutmeg yearbook entry for the 1928 men’s Connecticut Agricultural College basketball team.

==== 1931–1936: John Heldman Jr. ====
Connecticut named John Heldman Jr. head coach ahead of the 1931–32 season. Harrison "Honey" Fitch, the program's first African American player, joined the team in the 1932–33 season. Heldman made the controversial decision to bench Fitch in a game against the US Coast Guard Academy in 1934 after Coast Guard refused to play if Fitch was on the floor. Heldman coached the following year, but resigned after the first game of the 1935–36 season, a loss to the school's alumni. Heldman finished with a 19–42 overall record. J. O. Christian coached the remainder of the 1935–36 season, finishing with a 3–10 record as interim head coach.

==== 1936–1945: Don White ====
After five straight losing seasons, Don White was named head coach of the Huskies for the 1936–37 season. Prior to arriving at UConn, White spent 12 seasons as the head coach at Washington University. He led Connecticut to an 11–7 record in his first year. In the 1940–41 season, the team went 14–2 and won the school's fourth New England Conference championship. One of the first true stars from Connecticut was Hartford's Bernie Fisher, who played under White. He was captain of the 1944–45 team, which was the first Huskies team to play a game in Madison Square Garden. That season also included a 67–59 win over Rhode Island, a team ranked No. 19 in the country that year by the retrospective Premo-Porretta Power Poll. White left the Huskies after eight seasons to become the head coach at Rutgers. He compiled an overall record of 94–59 during his time with Connecticut.

==== 1945–1946: Blair Gullion ====
Connecticut hired Blair Gullion as White's replacement for the 1945–46 season. Gullion spent three seasons as head coach at Tennessee prior to World War II and took over as Connecticut's head coach after returning from his service in the war. He coached the Huskies to a 12–6 record in his first season. At the start of the 1946–47 season, Connecticut joined the newly formed Yankee Conference. Gullion left the team six games into the season to accept a position as Washington University's athletic director, finishing with a 15–8 overall record as head coach.

=== Hugh Greer era (1946–1963) ===
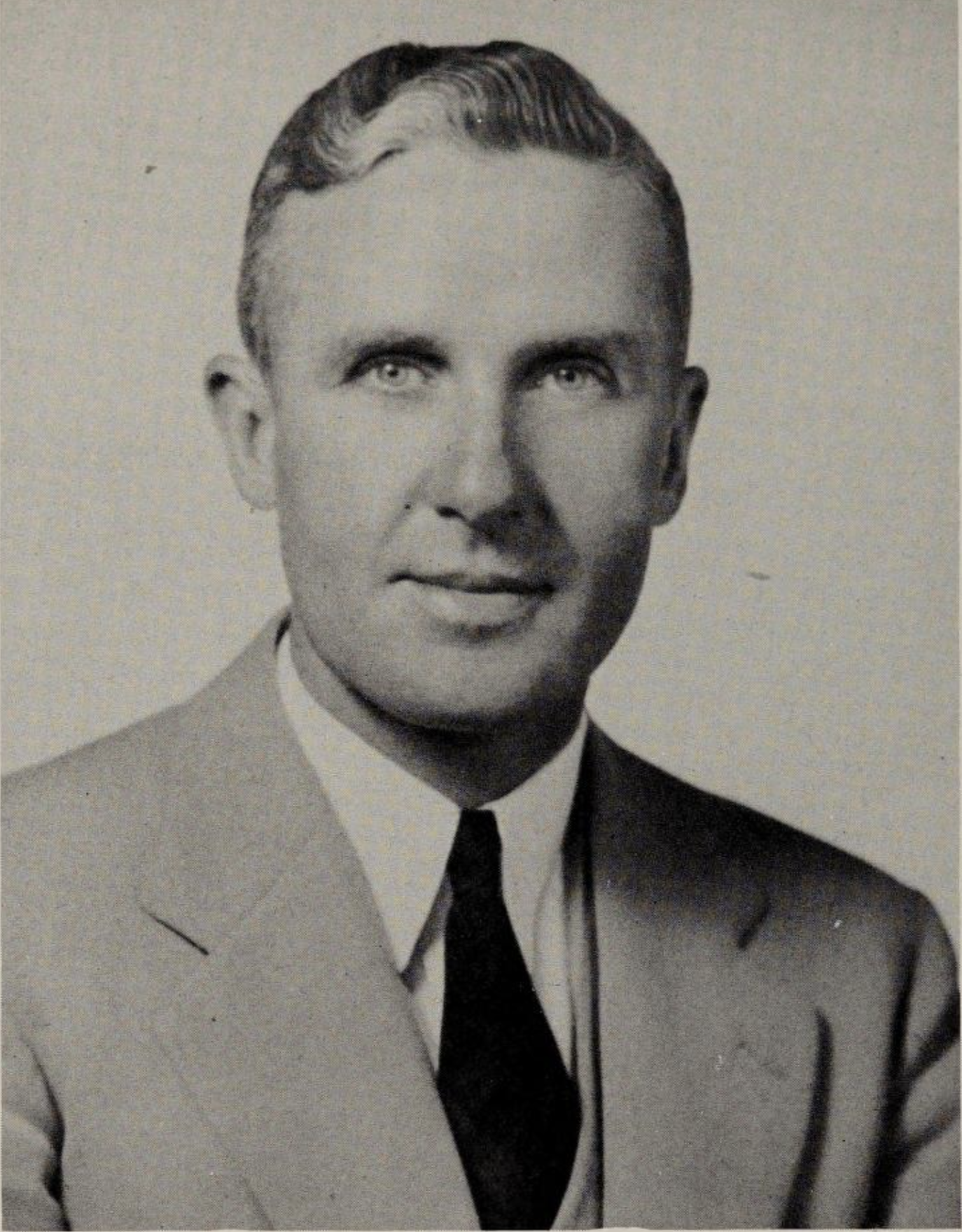
Hugh Greer in 1946

The modern era of UConn basketball began in 1946, when Hugh Greer became head coach after Gullion's midseason departure. Greer, a former player at the school in the 1920s, was in his second season as UConn's freshman team coach when Gullion resigned. Prior to that, Greer had coached at South Windsor's Ellsworth High School, winning five state championships between 1939 and 1945.

Led by senior Walt Dropo, a three-sport star at the school, the Huskies started the 1946–47 season 4–2 under Gullion, with road losses to rival Rhode Island and an NYU team that appeared in the NCAA tournament the previous year. Gullion resigned after the loss to NYU. The school then asked Greer to helm the team. He led UConn to a perfect 12–0 mark to finish the year, giving the team an overall record of 16–2 on the season. This was the best single season finish in school history to that point.

In the 1947–48 season, UConn moved into a new home arena, the Storrs Cage, replacing Hawley Armory. The structure was built by salvaging parts from a World War II airplane hangar, leading to the nickname "the Hangar." This facility had a capacity of 4,000 seats, allowing general admission attendance for the first time. The team's first game in the Storrs Cage was a 63–29 win over Maine in January 1948. The Huskies won their first Yankee Conference title at the end of that season.

UConn made its first NCAA tournament appearance in the 1950–51 season, where they lost to St. John's 63–52 at Madison Square Garden. The Huskies finished the season with a 22–4 overall record. In the 1953–54 season, Greer famously led UConn to a 78–77 victory against undefeated Holy Cross, breaking the Crusaders' 47-game home winning streak and keeping them out of the NCAA tournament. Holy Cross won the NIT title a few weeks later. UConn made its second NCAA tournament appearance and finished the year with a 23–3 overall record after a first round loss.

The UConn Field House replaced the Cage as the team's home court at the start of the 1954–55 season. UConn defeated rival Rhode Island in resounding fashion, 116–77, in the field house's inaugural game on December 1, 1954. The Huskies ended the season with their first National Invitation Tournament appearance and a 20–5 overall record.

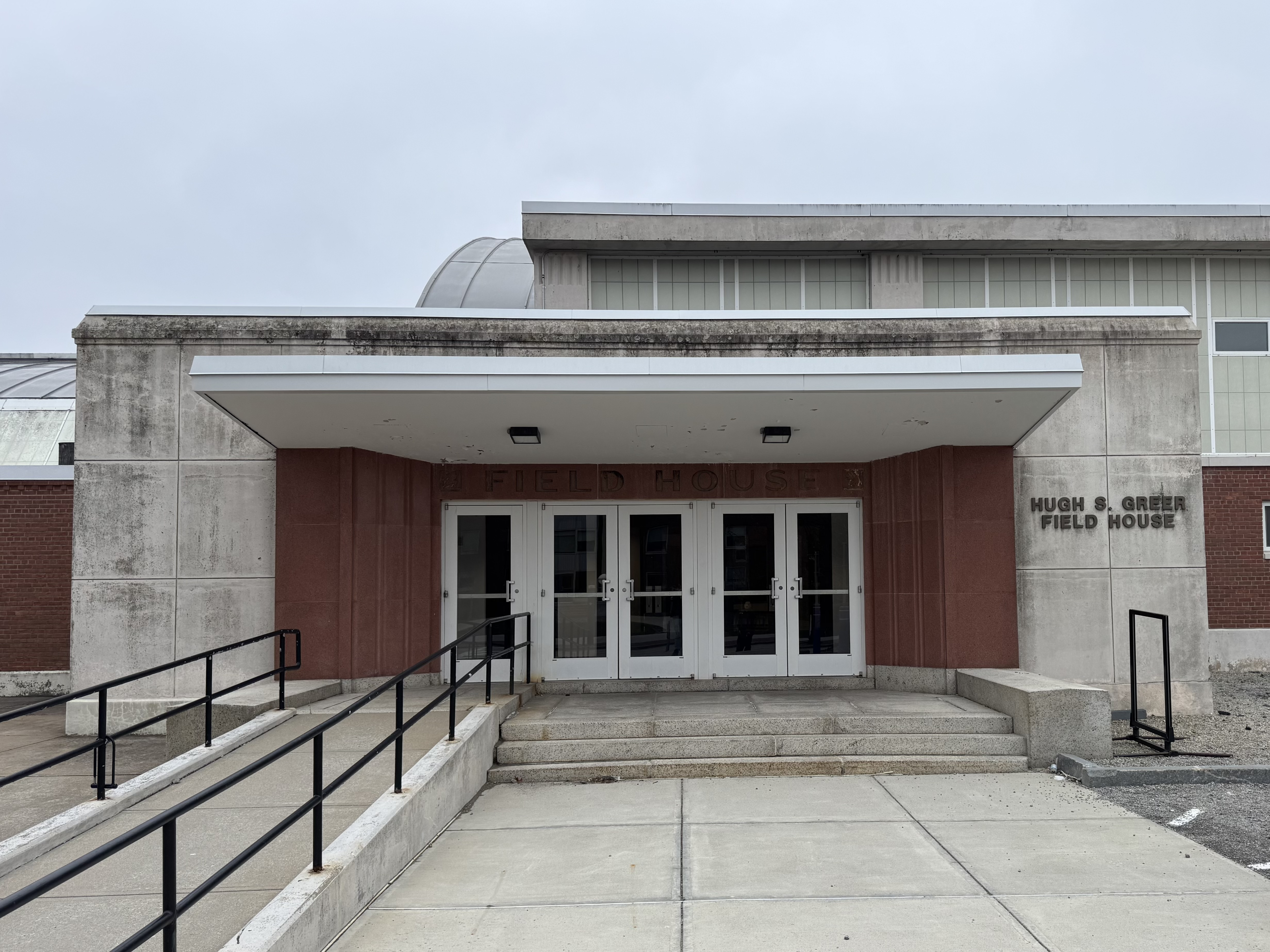
Hugh S. Greer Field House, originally known as the UConn Field House, was the on-campus home of UConn men's basketball from 1954 to 1990

In the 1955–56 season, Greer led UConn to its third NCAA tournament appearance and its first trip to the Sweet Sixteen following an 84–75 win over Manhattan in the first round. The Huskies narrowly lost to Temple 65–59 in the East Regional semifinal game played at Madison Square Garden. UConn made five consecutive trips to the NCAA tournament between 1956 and 1960, but lost in the first round in each one.

In 1960–61, UConn unexpectedly posted the program's first losing season in 17 years. It was the only losing season of Greer's tenure. The reason for the Huskies' struggles became apparent in March 1961, when two players were questioned as part of the 1961 NCAA men's basketball gambling scandal that resulted in the arrest of 37 players from 22 schools. Team captain Pete Kelly and center Glenn Cross were ultimately found to have accepted bribes to shave points throughout the season. Greer was devastated and never recovered from the scandal.

The Huskies improved to winning form in the 1961–62 season, but finished one game behind UMass in the race for the Yankee Conference title. Greer died of a heart attack 10 games into the 1962–63 season. His final game was a 92–64 win over Maine, played at the UConn Field House on January 12, 1963. He died two days after and was replaced by assistant coach George Wigton. Wigton and the Huskies posted an 11–3 record through their final 14 regular season games to win the Yankee Conference title and advance to the NCAA tournament for the eighth time in program history. The team lost in the first round to West Virginia, 77–71.

Under Greer, UConn won 12 Yankee Conference titles in 16 seasons, including 10 consecutive titles from 1951 to 1960. Greer also led UConn to its first seven NCAA berths and one NIT appearance while compiling an overall head coaching record of 286–112.

=== Fred Shabel era (1963–1967) ===
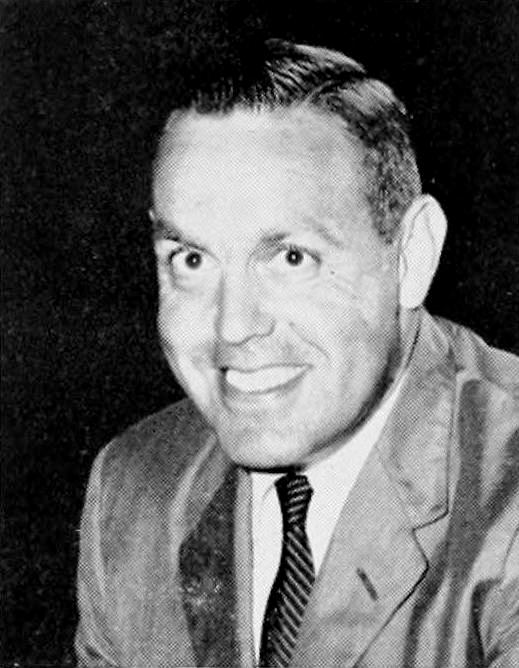
Fred Shabel in 1962

UConn named Fred Shabel as Greer's permanent replacement at head coach on April 1, 1963. Shabel previously spent six seasons as an assistant coach at Duke, four of which were under College Basketball Hall of Fame coach Vic Bubas. He played a role in Duke's first Final Four run in 1963 and initially accepted an offer to coach at Rutgers the following season, but withdrew after feeling unprepared to lead their program to success. Instead, he chose to accept an offer from Connecticut, which he believed had a clear path to the NCAA tournament in the Yankee Conference.

Shabel implemented a number of changes that had a significant impact on UConn's program and its culture. He introduced multiple defensive schemes for the first time, began calling offensive sets from the bench and pushed for the creation of the UConn pep band. Unlike Greer, who remained seated during most games, Shabel often stood and walked along the sideline.

Shabel's first year at the helm was an uneven one, with a 6–8 record in non-conference play in the 1963–64 season. However, the Huskies went 8–2 in Yankee Conference regular season play, tying with Rhode Island atop the conference standings to claim the program's 14th Yankee Conference title. In a one-game playoff, UConn defeated Rhode Island 61–60 on the road to break the tie, clinching the program's ninth appearance in the NCAA tournament. In the first round, UConn avenged a regular season loss to Temple, beating the heavily favored Owls 53–48 in Philadelphia. They faced even more difficult matchup with Princeton in the Sweet Sixteen. Before the game, Princeton coach Butch van Breda Kolff said he was so confident in his team's ability to win that he did not watch the Huskies' game against Temple. A tightly contested game throughout, UConn's Dom Perno stole the ball from future Hall of Famer Bill Bradley in the final seconds to seal a 52–50 win, sending the Huskies to the Elite Eight for the first time ever. The run ended there, however, as UConn lost to Shabel's former team, Duke, by a score of 101–55 in Raleigh, North Carolina.

Under Shabel, the Huskies won four Yankee Conference championships in four years, leading to three NCAA tournament berths. By the mid-1960s, UConn had appeared in the NCAA tournament 11 times, second most in the country. After the 1966–67 season, Shabel stepped down as head coach to become the athletic director at Penn. He later attributed the move to the school's ambivalence about committing greater financial resources to athletics, including the administration's decision to decline an invitation to the NIT in 1966 without consulting him.

=== Burr Carlson era (1967–1969) ===
After Shabel's departure, UConn offered the head coaching job to Larry Brown, then a young assistant coach at North Carolina. Brown declined, saying he felt he was too "young" to take a head coaching position.

The job ultimately went to Burr Carlson, a former player and an assistant under Shabel. Carlson led UConn to back-to-back losing seasons for the first time in over 30 years and resigned.

=== Dee Rowe era (1969–1977) ===
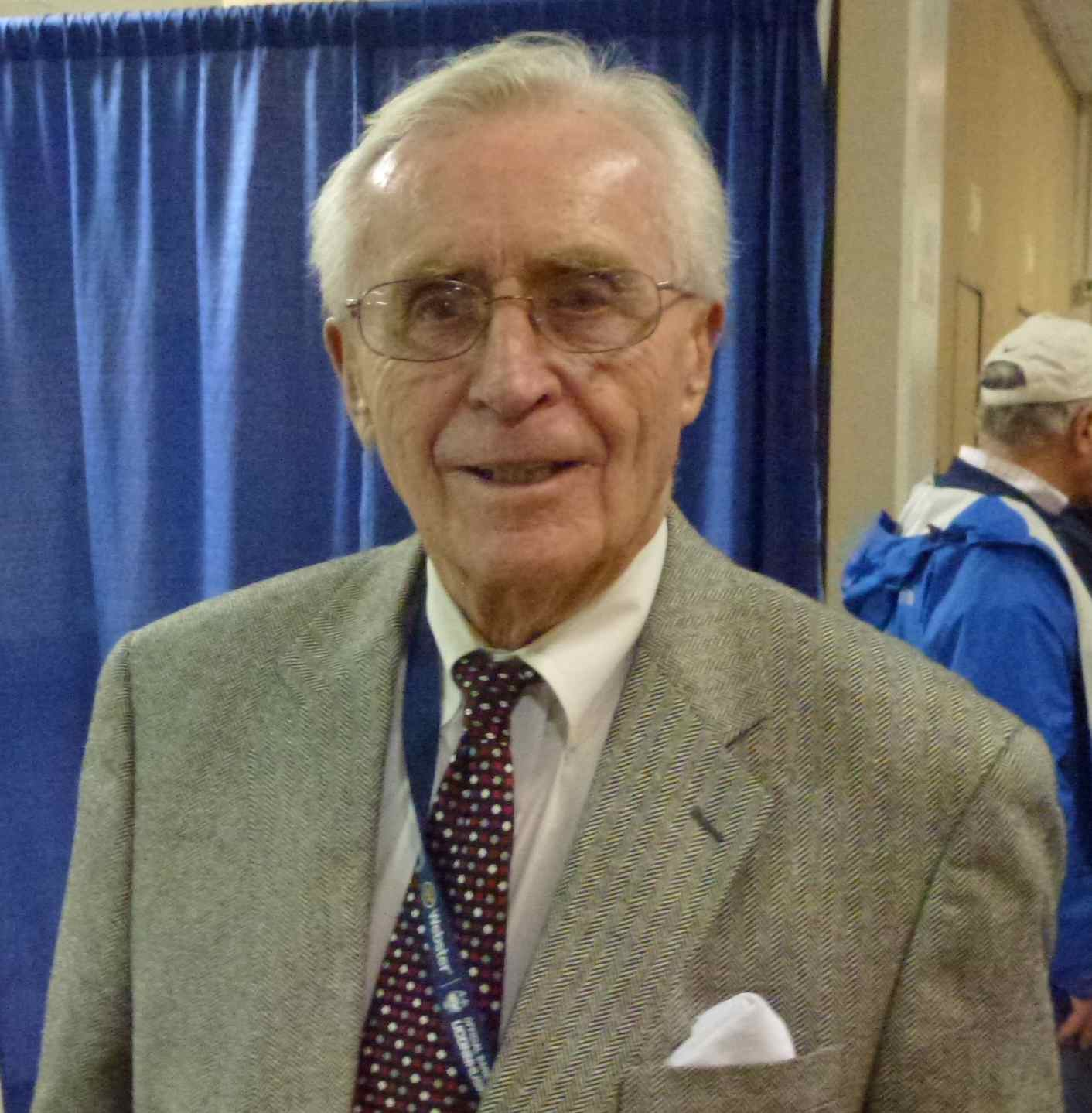
Dee Rowe in 2013

UConn named Dee Rowe head coach ahead of the 1969–70 season. Under Rowe, the Huskies returned to form, winning the Yankee Conference title in his first year. Rowe posted six winning seasons in eight years, with one NCAA berth and two NIT appearances. On Feb. 19, 1974, UConn became the first school in New England and one of the first in the country to start five black players in an intercollegiate basketball game. In 1976, UConn won the ECAC New England regional championship to earn an NCAA berth and then beat Hofstra in the first round of the 1976 NCAA tournament to reach the Sweet Sixteen for the fourth time ever. They ultimately lost to Rutgers in the Sweet Sixteen matchup, 93–79.

At the end of the 1975–76 season, the Yankee Conference dropped basketball, which left UConn as an independent. Rowe coached the Huskies' first season as an independent before retiring from coaching at 48 years old, citing heath issues at the time. He later would cite "burn out" as the reason for his decision.

=== Dom Perno era (1977–1986) ===
Former UConn star Dom Perno was tapped as Rowe's successor for the 1977–78 season. Perno oversaw UConn's transition from an independent program to a member of the newly formed Big East Conference in 1979, where UConn was one of the seven founding schools. Under Perno, the Huskies had some early success, winning an ECAC New England regional championship in 1979 and earning one NCAA berth (1979) and three NIT appearances over his first five years. However, after four consecutive losing seasons, Perno resigned on April 14, 1986.

=== Jim Calhoun era (1986–2012) ===
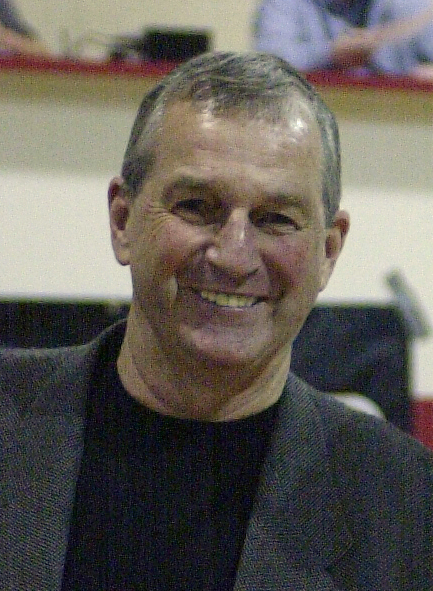
Jim Calhoun in 2003

==== 1986–87 Season: Calhoun's First Year ====
UConn hired Northeastern head coach Jim Calhoun to take over the program in the 1986–87 season. Before coming to Connecticut, Calhoun spent 14 seasons at Northeastern, leading the team to the NCAA tournament five times in his last six years with the school. In his final season, Calhoun's Northeastern team defeated UConn 90–73 in a game at the Hartford Civic Center.

Calhoun inherited a team that included future NBA player Clifford Robinson. However, Robinson and fellow starter Phil Gamble were declared academically ineligible halfway through the year. Calhoun finished his first year with a record of 9–19 overall and 3–13 in Big East conference play to garner his only losing season as UConn's head coach.

==== 1987–88 Season: NIT Champions ====
Heading into the 1987–88 season, Robinson and Gamble regained their academic eligibility and the team showed significant improvement. The Huskies won a game in the Big East tournament for the first time since 1980 and gained a berth in the National Invitation Tournament. UConn went on a run in the tournament and defeated Ohio State 72–67 at Madison Square Garden to win the NIT, the school's first national basketball title. UConn finished the season with a 20–14 record, its first winning season since 1981–82. The Huskies would ultimately achieve winning records in every season from 1987–88 through 2015–16.

==== 1989–90 Season: 'Dream Season', National Breakthrough ====
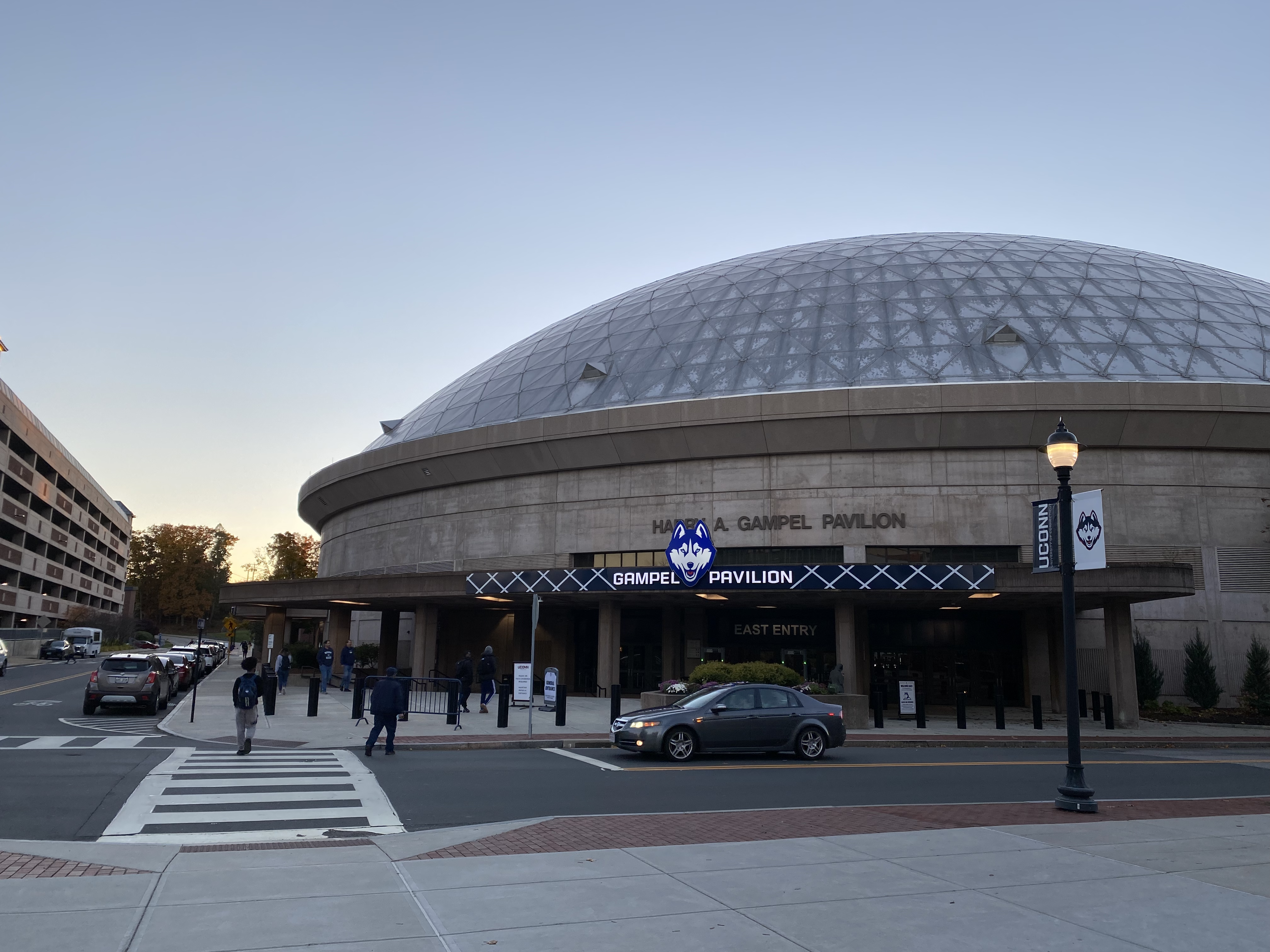
Gampel Pavilion, the current on-campus home of the UConn men's basketball team, opened in 1990

The 1990 “Dream Season” brought UConn basketball back to the national stage. Led by Chris Smith, Nadav Henefeld, Scott Burrell, Tate George, and Rod Sellers, UConn went from unranked in the preseason to winning the Big East regular season and tournament championships, both for the first time. January 1990 in particular marked several major milestones for the team. After an already historic 13–3 start to the season, the Huskies were able to defeat No. 5 Syracuse and No. 2 Georgetown in back-to-back games played at the Hartford Civic Center. After their 70–65 victory over the Hoyas on January 20th, the Huskies entered the AP ranking for the first time all season at No. 20. 1990 also marked the opening of Gampel Pavilion, the program's new on-campus home, which opened on January 21st.

UConn entered the Big East tournament ranked No. 8 in the nation and with a 12–4 record in conference play. As the #2 seed in the tournament, the Huskies handily defeated Seton Hall in the quarterfinals before capturing a 65–60 victory over No. 5 Georgetown the following day. On March 11, UConn defeated No. 4 Syracuse 78–75 in the championship game to capture their first ever Big East title, thus assuring their place in the NCAA tournament for the first time since 1979.

In the NCAA tournament, the Huskies garnered a #1 seed in the East Region for the first time ever. They easily won their first two matches, winning both games by 20 points or more. In the Sweet Sixteen, UConn trailed #5 seed Clemson 70–69 with 1 second remaining. Scott Burrell's full-court pass found Tate George on the far baseline. George spun, fired, and hit a buzzer-beater that is known in Connecticut simply as "The Shot". However, they would be eliminated on a buzzer-beater two days later by #3 seed and eventual national runner-up Duke in the Elite Eight, losing in overtime 79–78. UConn finished the season with a 31–6 overall record. The 1989–90 season ultimately marked the beginning of UConn's' sustained success in men's basketball on the national level, and the program began making regular appearances in the NCAA tournament going forward.

==== 1990s: Creation of a Basketball Powerhouse ====
UConn continued to rise as a national program throughout the 1990s, winning five Big East regular season (1990, 1994, 1995, 1996, 1998) and three Big East tournament championships (1990, 1996, 1998), as well as making the Elite Eight three times (1990, 1995, 1998), prior to their 1998–99 national championship season.

One of the most notable players of the era was future NBA legend Ray Allen, who played for the Huskies from 1993 until he was selected as the No. 5 overall pick in the 1996 NBA draft. In his junior season, Allen averaged 23.4 points, 6.5 rebounds, 3.3 assists and 1.7 steals in 34.7 minutes per game. In the 1996 Big East Championship against Georgetown, Allen made the winning shot with only 14 seconds remaining to achieve a 75–74 victory over the Hoyas. This game is widely considered one of the greatest in Big East tournament history, as UConn was able to end the game with a 12–0 run with under 5 minutes to play. Following the championship, Allen was named the Big East Player of the Year and earned first-team All-Big East for the second year in a row. The Huskies ultimately advanced to the Sweet Sixteen in the NCAA tournament that year before falling to Mississippi State, 60–55.

==== 1998–99 Season: 'We Shocked the World', 1st NCAA Title ====
UConn entered the 1998–99 season ranked No. 2 in the AP Top 25 poll, returning its entire starting five from the previous year's Elite Eight team. Calhoun convinced leading scorer Richard "Rip" Hamilton to return for his junior season instead of departing for the NBA, putting the Huskies in position to make a historic run. UConn started the season 19–0, with wins over five ranked teams. By early December, the Huskies were ranked No. 1 in the AP poll, where they stayed for a program-record 10 weeks. The team's first loss came to No. 16 Syracuse on February 1, 1999, a 59–42 defeat in front of a sold-out crowd at the Hartford Civic Center. Both Hamilton and starting center Jake Voskuhl were out with injuries. UConn quickly rebounded, however, beating No. 4 Stanford 70–59 on the road. The Huskies finished the year ranked 1st in the Big East, winning their fifth conference regular season title in six years. On March 3, 1999, UConn defeated #3 seeded St. John’s 82–63 to win their fourth Big East tournament championship. Kevin Freeman was named the tournament's MVP.

The Huskies received a #1 seed in the NCAA tournament for the third time in program history. On March 20, 1999, UConn defeated #10 seed Gonzaga 67–62 in the Elite Eight to advance to the program's first-ever Final Four. In the National Semifinals, the Huskies defeated #4 seed Ohio State 64–58 to advance to the title game. Facing the #1 overall seed Duke, UConn was a 9.5-point underdog heading into the matchup. However, the Huskies prevailed by a score of 77–74 to claim the program's first-ever national championship. As time expired, Khalid El-Amin ran over to a television camera on the court and shouted, "We shocked the world!" Richard Hamilton was named the tournament's Most Outstanding Player, contributing 27 points, 7 rebounds, and 3 assists in the championship game. UConn finished with a 34–2 overall record to achieve its best seasonal winning percentage in the program's history (as of 2026). After the season, Hamilton was selected in the 1999 NBA draft as the No. 7 overall pick.

==== 2003–04 Season: 'Calhoun's Best Team', 2nd NCAA Title ====
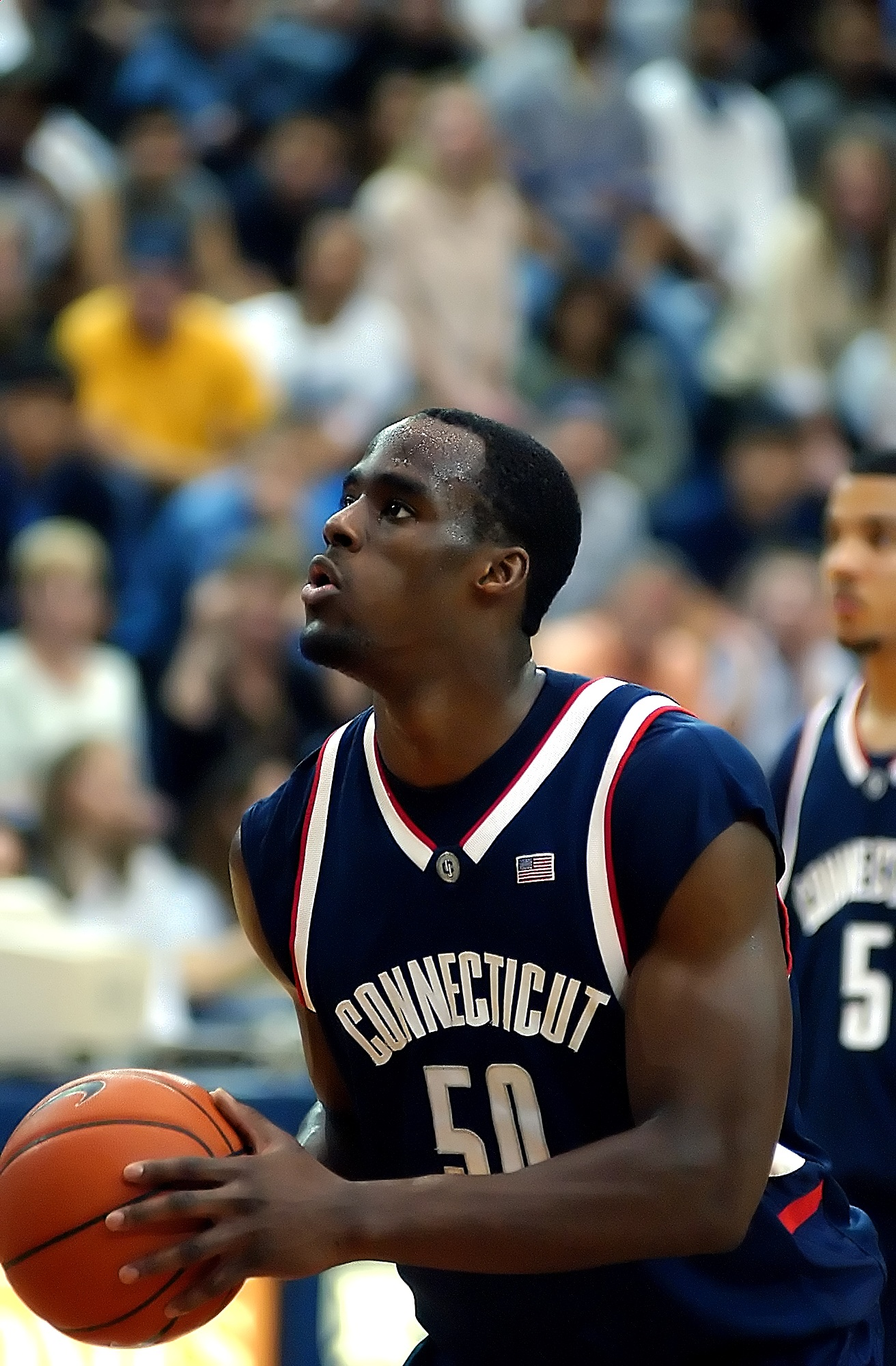
Emeka Okafor, 2004 NABC National Player of the Year

Expectations were high at UConn heading into the 2003–04 season. Returning their entire starting lineup from the previous year's Sweet Sixteen team, the Huskies were selected as the preseason No. 1 team in the AP Top 25 poll. UConn faced its first setback in the fourth game of the season, losing to Georgia Tech 77–61 in the Preseason NIT semifinals. However, the team responded with 11 consecutive wins, including an 86–59 victory over No. 7 Oklahoma at Gampel Pavilion on January 11, 2004. The streak ended with an 86–83 loss at No. 11 North Carolina on January 17, 2004. UConn ultimately finished the year second in the Big East, obtaining a 12–4 record in conference play during the regular season. In the Big East tournament, the team defeated #7 seed Notre Dame in the quarterfinals and #11 seed Villanova in the semifinals with relative ease. On March 13, 2004, the Huskies defeated #1 seed Pittsburgh 61–58 in a thrilling championship game to win the program's sixth Big East tournament championship. Ben Gordon scored a tournament-record 84 points over three games and was named the tournament's MVP.

The Huskies were awarded a #2 seed in the NCAA tournament and advanced to the program's second Final Four with an 87–71 win over #8 seed Alabama in the Elite Eight on March 27, 2004. In the National Semifinals, UConn came back from an 8-point deficit with three minutes remaining to defeat #1 seed Duke 79–78 on April 3, 2004. The Huskies won their second NCAA championship on April 5, 2004, defeating #3 seed Georgia Tech 82–73 in a rematch of their regular season contest. Emeka Okafor was named the tournament's Most Outstanding Player, and UConn finished the season with a 33–6 overall record. After the season, Okafor and Gordon were selected in the 2004 NBA draft as the No. 2 and No. 3 overall picks, respectively. Calhoun said he considers the 2003–04 team to be the best he ever coached.

Calhoun was inducted into the Basketball Hall of Fame in 2005.

==== 2008–09 Season: 6OT Game, 3rd Final Four ====
After steadily rebuilding over the prior two years, UConn entered the 2008–09 season ranked No. 2 in the preseason AP Top 25 poll. The Huskies returned their entire starting lineup from the previous season and added 2008 McDonald's All-American Kemba Walker to the roster. The team started the year 11–0, including double-digit wins over No. 17 Miami and No. 25 Wisconsin en route to the US Virgin Islands Paradise Jam championship. With an 88–83 win over No. 8 Gonzaga in Seattle on December 20, 2008, UConn earned its third ranked victory of the year ahead of conference play. The Huskies' first stumble came in their Big East opener, a 74–63 loss at home to No. 11 Georgetown. The team responded with 12 straight conference wins that propelled UConn to a No. 1 ranking in the AP poll by February. In mid-February, the team lost key starter Jerome Dyson to a season-ending knee injury in a 63–49 win against No. 23 Syracuse. UConn finished the regular season 4–2 without Dyson—with the two losses coming against Pittsburgh, ranked top-five in both matchups.

The Huskies finished the year tied for second in the Big East and received the #3 seed in the conference tournament. In the Big East tournament quarterfinals, UConn lost to #6 seeded Syracuse in a six-overtime game remembered as one of the greatest college basketball games of all time. The Orange appeared to a hit a game-winning shot at the end of regulation, but the basket was waived off after review. Syracuse never led in the first five overtimes, but UConn was unable to put the game away. The Huskies went scoreless in the first two and a half minutes of the sixth overtime and fell to the Orange 127–117. Despite the loss, UConn was awarded a #1 seed in the NCAA tournament and advanced to the program's third Final Four with an 82–75 win over #3 seed Missouri. The Huskies' run ended in the Final Four with an 82–73 loss to #2 seed Michigan State. UConn finished the season with a 31–5 overall record. After the season, Hasheem Thabeet and A. J. Price were selected in the 2009 NBA draft as the No. 2 and No. 52 overall picks, respectively.

==== 2010–11 Season: 'Cardiac Kemba', 3rd NCAA Title ====
UConn entered the 2010–11 season unranked and picked to finish tenth in the Big East. But after a 10–0 start that included wins over No. 2 Michigan State and No. 8 Kentucky en route to the Maui Invitational Tournament championship, the Huskies catapulted to No. 7 in the AP Top 25 poll. The team reached No. 4 in the poll by the start of conference play and were projected to be a force to reckon with in the Big East regular season. However, the Huskies struggled against their Big East opponents, finishing the regular season in a tie for ninth place after losing four of their last five games. The team finished the regular season with a 9–9 record in conference play and ranked No. 21 in the AP Poll.

In the first two rounds of the Big East tournament, UConn defeated #16 seed DePaul and #8 seed Georgetown. In the quarterfinals, Kemba Walker hit a step-back, game-winning shot as time expired to defeat #1 seed Pittsburgh, 76–74. Dave Pasch immortalized the shot with his call on the ESPN broadcast: "Cardiac Kemba does it again!" The Huskies defeated #4 seed Syracuse 76–71 in overtime in the semifinals and then defeated #3 seed Louisville 69–66 in the championship game to claim the program's seventh Big East tournament title. UConn became the first school to win five conference tournament games in five days, and Kemba Walker scored a tournament-record 130 points.

The Huskies were awarded a #3 seed in the NCAA tournament and ultimately advanced to their fourth Final Four after a 65–63 victory over #5 seed Arizona in the Elite Eight. They defeated #4 seed Kentucky 56–55 in the Final Four and #8 seed Butler 53–41 in the national championship game to capture the schools third NCAA title. Walker was named the tournament's Most Outstanding Player, averaging 23.5 points, 5.4 rebounds, and 4.5 assists per game throughout the season. UConn finished the season with a 32–9 overall record, becoming the first and (as of 2024) only men's or women's basketball team to play 41 games in one season. After the season, Walker was selected in the 2011 NBA draft as the No. 9 overall pick.

Calhoun officially announced his retirement on September 13, 2012.

=== Kevin Ollie era (2012–2018) ===
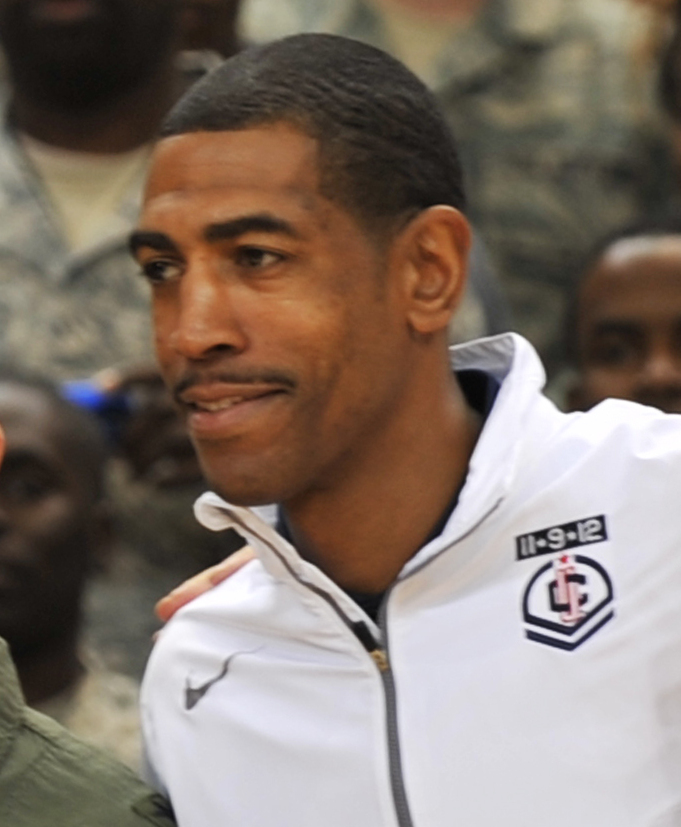
Kevin Ollie in 2013

Kevin Ollie was named UConn's next head coach at Jim Calhoun's retirement press conference in Gampel Pavilion. Ollie played for Calhoun from 1991 to 1995 before spending 13 seasons as a journeyman in the NBA. He returned to UConn in 2010 to serve as one of Calhoun's assistant coaches during the 2010–11 and 2011–12 seasons.

Conference realignment resulted in the breakup of the old Big East at the end of the Ollie's first season as a head coach. Instead of leaving with the so-called Catholic 7 schools, UConn chose to remain a member of the original Big East's legal successor, later named the American Athletic Conference. Until leaving the American in 2020 to join the new Big East, UConn was the only charter member of the original Big East still playing in the conference.

==== 2013–14 Season: 'Hungry Huskies', 4th NCAA Title ====
After facing a ban in postseason play in Ollie's first season due to a low APR score, the Huskies came into the 2013–14 season ranked No. 18 in the AP Top 25 poll. They started the year 9–0, which included a 59–58 win over Indiana in the 2K Sports Classic championship game and a 65–64 win over No. 15 Florida on a buzzer-beater from Shabazz Napier. UConn climbed to No. 10 in the AP poll before losing its first game to Stanford on December 18, 2013. The team finished the year tied for third in the inaugural season of the American Athletic Conference and advanced to the AAC tournament championship game, where they lost by 10 points to No. 5 Louisville. UConn was selected to the NCAA Tournament as a #7 seed and then defeated #10 seed St Joseph’s in overtime, #2 seed Villanova, and #3 seed Iowa State in the Sweet 16 to advance to the regional final. On March 30, 2014, Kevin Ollie became the first UConn coach other than Jim Calhoun to lead the Huskies to a Final Four after defeating #4 seed Michigan State 60–54 in the Elite Eight. The Huskies beat the #1 overall seed Florida 63–53 in the Final Four and then won the national championship on April 7, 2014, defeating #8 seed Kentucky, 60–54.

Shabazz Napier was named the tournament's Most Outstanding Player and in his postgame remarks called out the NCAA for the previous year's postseason ban: "You're looking at the hungry Huskies. This is what happens when you ban us." Other major contributions to the team's unexpected tournament run came from point guard Ryan Boatright, who averaged over 12 points and 3.5 rebounds per game throughout the season, and small forward DeAndre Daniels. Ollie's team was the first #7 seed to ever win the NCAA tournament. UConn finished the season with a 32–8 overall record. After the season, Napier and Daniels were selected in the 2014 NBA draft as the No. 24 and No. 37 overall picks, respectively.

==== 2015–16 Season: AAC Champions ====
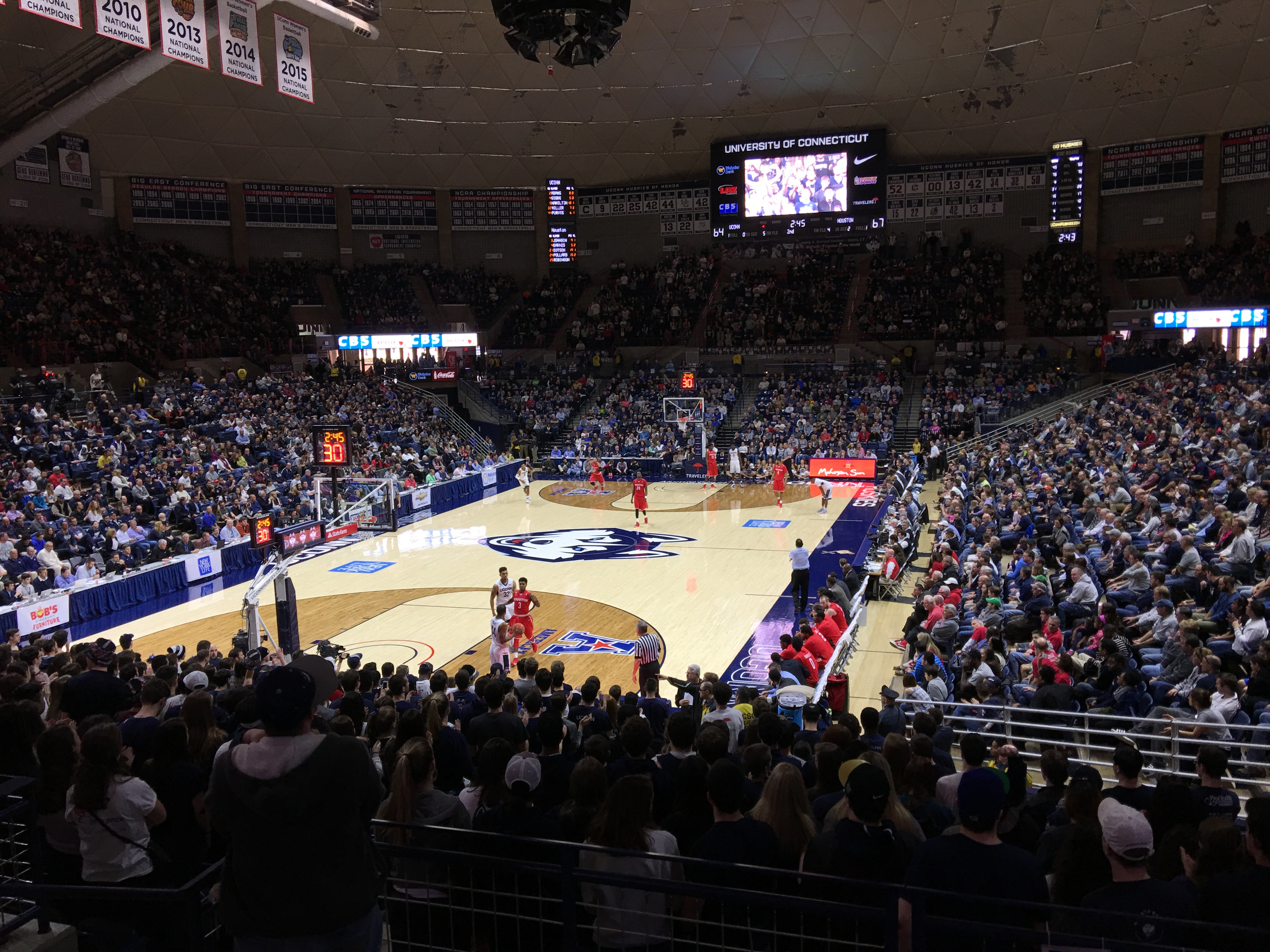
Gampel Pavilion during a UConn men's basketball game against Houston on February 28, 2016

Despite failing to make the NCAA tournament the prior season, UConn entered the 2015–16 season ranked No. 20 in the AP Top 25 poll. The Huskies started 4–0 and climbed to No. 18 in the poll. However, they dropped three of their next four, losing to Syracuse, No. 10 Gonzaga, and No. 6 Maryland, and fell out the top 25. The team bounced back and briefly re-entered the top 25 in mid-December. They would again re-enter the top 25 in January before falling out for the remainder of the year. UConn posted an 11–7 record in conference play, narrowly missing a three-way tie for third place at 12–6 in the American. Instead, the Huskies finished sixth, but received the #5 seed in the tournament because SMU was ineligible for postseason play.

In one of the program's most memorable postseason games, UConn defeated #4 seed Cincinnati 104–97 in quadruple overtime the AAC tournament quarterfinals. Down by 3 with 0.6 seconds left on the clock in the third overtime, Jalen Adams hit a three-quarter court shot to force the fourth and final overtime. UConn then defeated #1 seed Temple in the semifinals and #6 seed Memphis in the championship game to win the American Athletic Conference tournament championship. Daniel Hamilton was named the conference tournament's MVP. UConn returned to the NCAA tournament at a No. 9 seed and defeated #8 seed Colorado 74–67 in the Round of 64. However, the Huskies were eliminated by the #1 overall seed Kansas Jayhawks 73–61 in the Round of 32. UConn finished their season with a 25–11 overall record. After the season, Hamilton was selected as the No. 56 overall pick in the 2016 NBA draft.

==== 2016–17 Season: First Losing Season in Thirty Years ====
Despite losing their MVP in Daniel Hamilton, UConn entered the 2016–17 season ranked No. 18 in the AP Top 25 poll. However, they fell out of the rankings after opening the year with upset losses at home to Wagner and Northeastern. On December 5, 2016, the Huskies defeated Syracuse 52–50 in the Tire Pro Classic at Madison Square Garden. This win gave the team some confidence after a disappointing 3–4 start to the season. However, without their previous season's MVP in Daniel Hamilton, UConn would continue to struggle against their AAC opponents going forward, losing four out of their last five games in AAC play.

The team finished the regular season tied for fifth place in the American with a 9–9 record in conference play, and were given the #6 seed in the conference tournament. The Huskies managed to pull off an upset win over #3 seed Houston in the AAC tournament quarterfinals, but lost in the semifinals to #2 seed Cincinnati the following day. UConn finished with a 16–17 overall record, the program's first losing season in 30 years.

==== 2017–18 Season: Nadir for UConn Basketball ====
The Huskies were unranked for the entire 2017–18 season and had 11 double-digit losses. On January 26, 2018, the school announced the NCAA was investigating UConn for possible recruiting violations related to three players. The team finished the regular season tied for eighth place in the American (7–11 record in AAC play) and lost to #9 seed SMU 80–73 in the first round of the conference tournament on March 8, 2018. UConn finished with a 14–18 overall record in what is widely considered to be the teams worst-performing season since the Jim Calhoun era began in 1986. Two days after the loss to SMU, Kevin Ollie was fired for just cause related to the NCAA investigation.

In Ollie's final season, UConn men's basketball game attendance reached its lowest level in nearly 30 years, illustrating the severe decline in its prominence and performance since the program's 2014 National Championship.

On July 2, 2019, the NCAA announced UConn's wins for the 2017–18 season would be vacated because of the school's recruiting violations, giving the school a 0–18 official record for the year.

=== Dan Hurley era (2018–present) ===
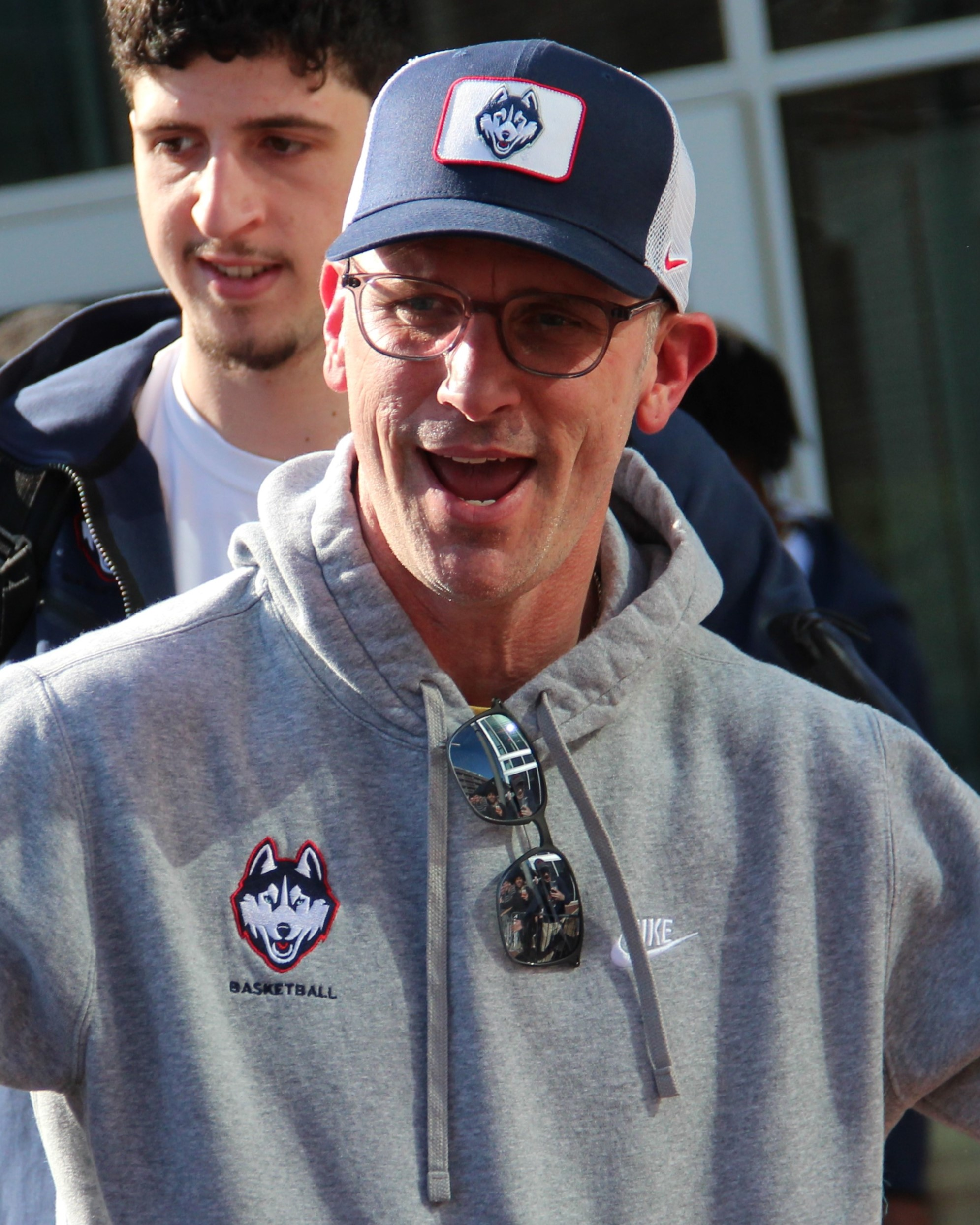
Dan Hurley during a 2023 departure ceremony for the NCAA Final Four

UConn hired Rhode Island head coach Dan Hurley as Ollie's replacement for the 2018–19 season. He was introduced on March 23, 2018. Prior to his six seasons at Rhode Island, Hurley spent nine years coaching at St. Benedict's Preparatory School in New Jersey and two years at Wagner College. His father is Bob Hurley Sr., a longtime New Jersey high school basketball coach and Naismith Memorial Basketball Hall of Fame inductee, and his brother is Bobby Hurley, two-time national champion as a player and current head coach at Arizona State.

==== 2018–19 Season: Hurley's First Year ====
Hurley's first season at UConn was an up-and-down affair. The first marquee win under Hurley came in his third game when the Huskies defeated No. 15 Syracuse 83–76 in the 2K Sports Classic semifinals at Madison Square Garden. This win was the programs first top 15 victory since the 2014 NCAA tournament. However, UConn lost to Iowa the following day in the tournament championship game and continued to struggle heavily throughout the season against quality opponents. The team ultimately garnered a 6–12 record in the American Athletic Conference, its worst record in conference play in over three decades. The Huskies were given a #9 seed in the AAC tournament, and their season ended with an 84–45 loss to #1 seed Houston in the quarterfinals. While UConn's 16–17 record was an improvement from the previous year, it marked the third-straight losing season for the program.

On June 27, 2019, UConn and the Big East announced that the school would return to the conference for the 2020–21 season.

==== 2019–20 Season: Final Year in the American ====
With UConn's return to the Big East imminent, the Huskies had one season left to play in the American Athletic Conference. The team gained a 4-star recruiting class that included future First-team All-Big East guard James Bouknight, as well as transfer point guard R. J. Cole (had to redshirt due to transfer portal rules). UConn started the year 9–3, including an upset win over No. 15 Florida at Gampel Pavilion on November 17, 2019. In one of the most memorable games of the year, the Huskies lost 75–74 in double overtime to No. 18 Xavier in the Charleston Classic tournament semifinals on November 22, 2019. The team ultimately went on to finish in 3rd place in the tournament after defeating Miami 80–55 the next day. Despite the loss, it became clear that UConn was becoming a more competitive team after suffering three losing seasons in a row. On January 18, 2020, after a 61–55 loss at No. 14 Villanova—a non-conference game that would become a conference game the next year—Hurley remarked that other teams "better get us now. That's all, you better get us now. Because it's coming," foreshadowing the program's return to national relevance in the years ahead. In the penultimate game of the regular season, UConn defeated No. 21 Houston 77–71 at Gampel Pavilion on senior night and finished the year tied for fifth place in the American with a 10–8 record in conference play.

UConn was set to face Tulane in the first round of the AAC tournament on March 12, 2020. However, the onset of the COVID-19 pandemic resulted in the AAC tournament being canceled mere hours before it was set to tip off. The team finished the season with a 19–12 overall record, its first winning season since 2015–16.

==== 2020–21 Season: Return to the Big East ====
UConn's return to the Big East for the 2020–21 season was overshadowed by the uncertainty of the COVID-19 pandemic. The Huskies played all of their home games in Gampel Pavilion with no fans in attendance. Five games were cancelled, and four others were rescheduled as players, coaches and staff tested positive for the virus. The team gained several players this season that would play key roles in the years ahead, including future NCAA tournament MOP Adama Sanogo. Other recruits of note were future NBA draftees Andre Jackson Jr. and junior Tyrese Martin, who transferred from Rhode Island. UConn finished third in the conference and lost in the Big East tournament semifinals to #2 seed Creighton, 59–56.

The Huskies returned to the NCAA tournament for the first time in five years and were awarded a #7 seed. The season ended with a first-round loss to #10 seed Maryland, 63–54. UConn finished the season with a 15–8 overall record, playing its least number of games since the pre-Calhoun era. After the season, James Bouknight was selected as the No. 11 overall pick in the 2021 NBA draft. During Bouknight's sophomore season at UConn, he was considered to be the team's top scorer, averaging 18.7 points and 5.7 rebounds per game throughout the season.

==== 2021–22 Season: Postseason Shortfalls ====
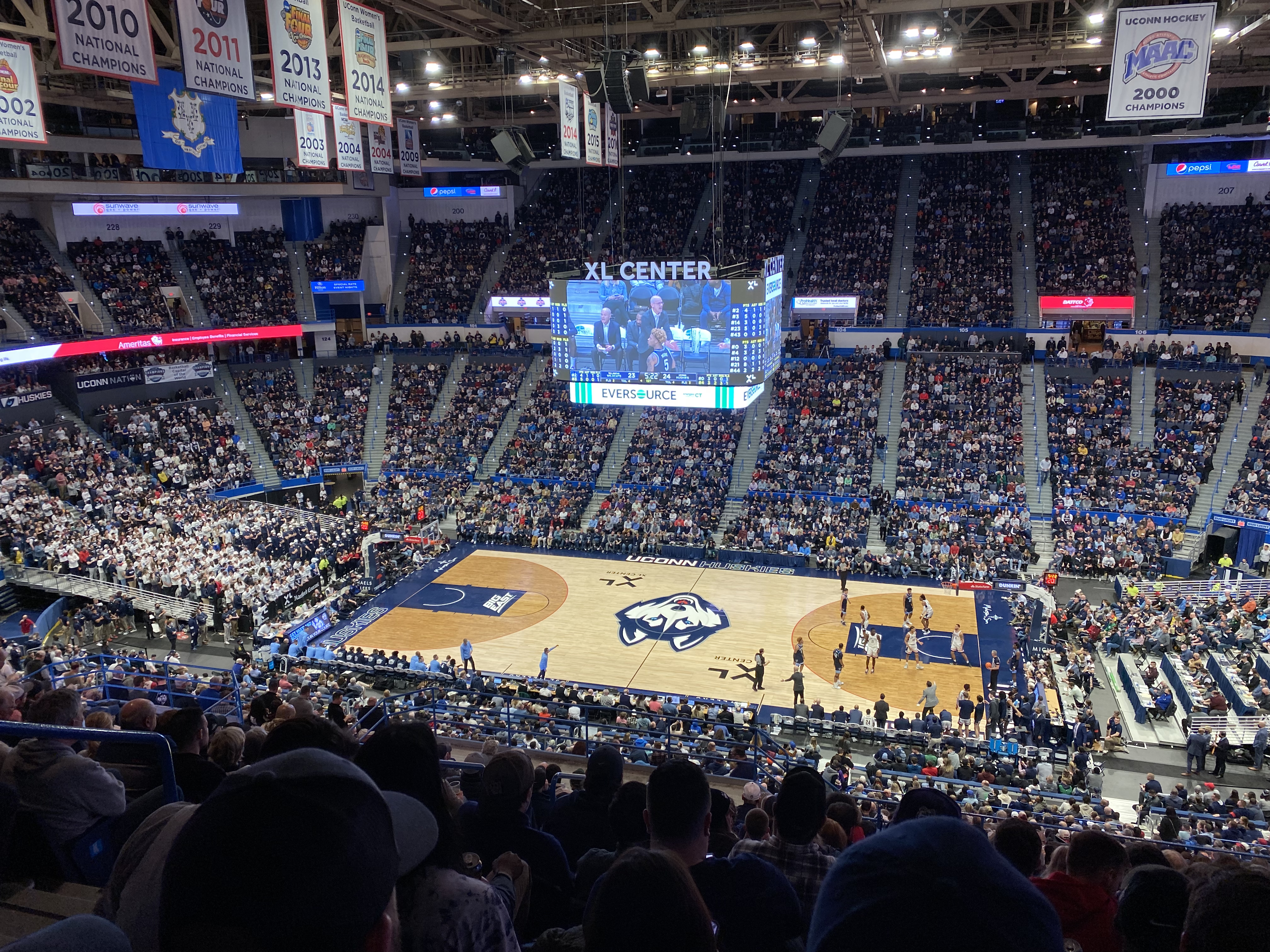
The XL Center during a sold-out UConn men's basketball game against No. 8 Villanova on February 22, 2022

Despite losing its leading scorer in Bouknight, UConn returned four out of five starters in the 2021–22 season and came into the year ranked No. 24 in the preseason AP Top 25 poll. The team also gained another 4-star recruiting class that included several key players in the following championship season, such as Jordan Hawkins, Samson Johnson, and redshirt Alex Karaban. The Huskies started off 5–0, including a 115–109 double-overtime win against No. 19 Auburn in the Battle 4 Atlantis quarterfinals. The team lost to Michigan State in the semifinals the following day. On February 22, 2022, UConn defeated No. 8 Villanova 71–69 at the XL Center—securing the program's first 20-win season in six years and its first top 10 win in eight years.

UConn again finished third in the Big East, entering the postseason with a 22–8 record (13–6 in conference play), its highest regular-season win total since 2013–14. However, the Huskies lost in the Big East tournament semifinals for the second year in a row, this time narrowly to #2 seed Villanova, 63–60.

UConn was awarded a #5 seed in the NCAA tournament, but the season ended with another first-round exit—an upset loss to #12-seed New Mexico State, with a final score of 70–63. The team finished the season with a 23–10 overall record. Major contributions to the team's success came from shooting guard Tyrese Martin and point guard R. J. Cole, who averaged 15.8 points, 4.1 assists, and 3.4 rebounds per game throughout the season. Martin was a major rebounder for the team, averaging 7.5 rebounds and 13.6 points per game throughout the season. After the season, Martin was selected as the No. 51 overall pick in the 2022 NBA draft.

==== 2022–23 Season: 'Blue Blood', 5th NCAA Title ====
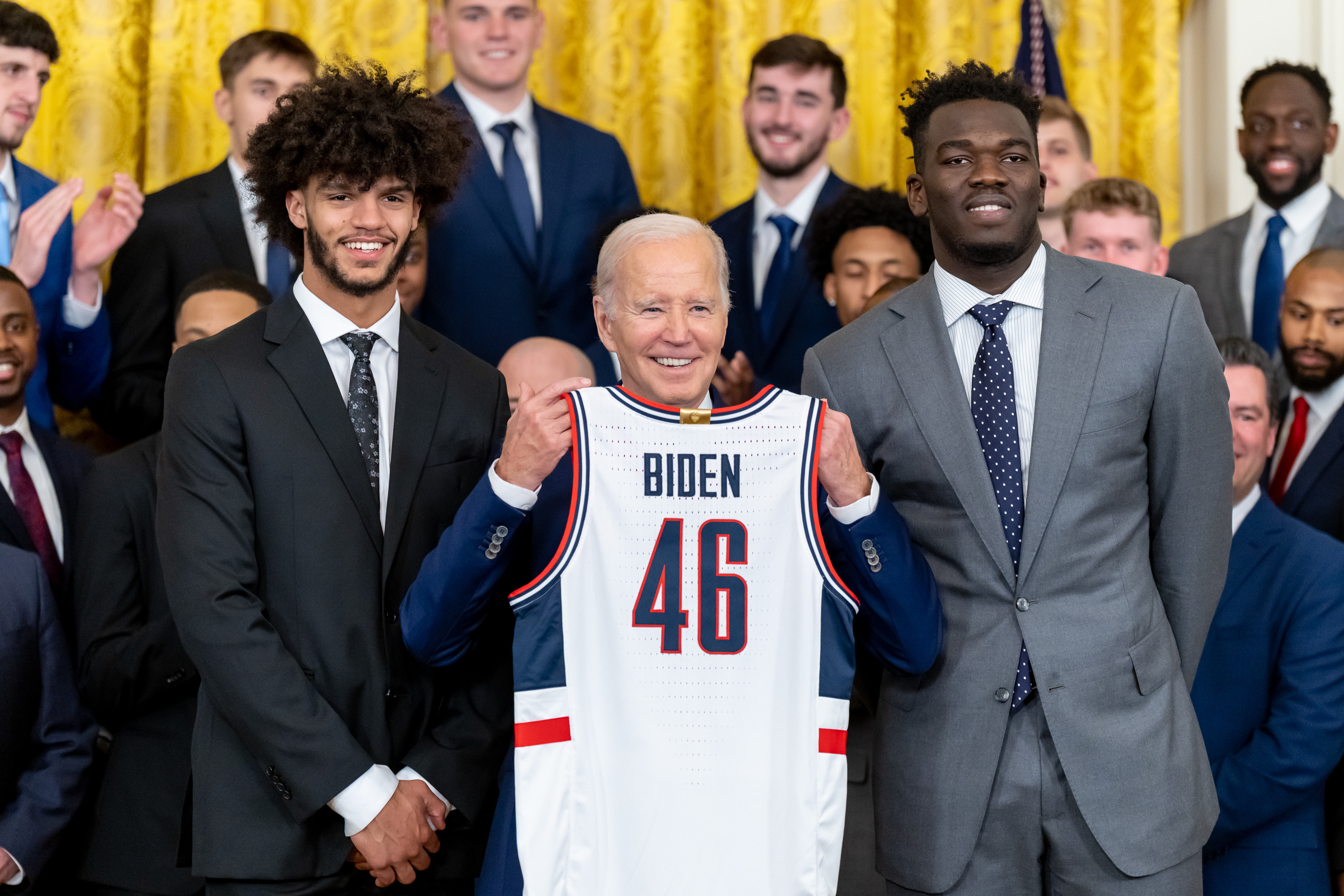
University of Connecticut Huskies men’s basketball team captains Andre Jackson Jr. and Adama Sanogo present President Joe Biden with a commemorative jersey at an event celebrating the team’s 2022-23 NCAA championship.

The Huskies entered the 2022–23 season unranked after losing eight scholarship players to transfer, graduation, and the draft. Despite this, UConn jumped out to a 14–0 start, winning the Phil Knight Invitational championship and climbing to No. 2 in the AP Top 25 poll by mid-December. The team cooled off in January, losing six of their next eight games, but returned to form and went 8–1 to close out the regular season. The Huskies finished fourth in the Big East and, for the third straight year, lost in the Big East tournament semifinals with a 70–68 loss to No. 1 seed Marquette.

UConn was awarded a #4 seed in the NCAA tournament and then won six straight games by an average of 20.0 points to claim the program's fifth national championship, with a 76–59 victory over #5 seed San Diego State in the title game. Adama Sanogo was named the tournament's Most Outstanding Player, averaging over 20 points and 9.8 rebounds per game in the tournament. Shooting guard Jordan Hawkins was named the Most Outstanding Player of the tournament's West Regional after averaging 22 points and four rebounds in the Huskies' Sweet Sixteen and Elite Eight games. He also scored 16 points against San Diego State in the 2023 national championship game. Other major contributions to the team's success came from shooting guard Andre Jackson Jr., as well as transfers Tristen Newton, Joey Calcaterra, and Hassan Diarra. Two freshmen, forward Alex Karaban and backup center Donovan Clingan, also made their mark on one of the most dominant teams in the history of March Madness.

The Huskies were the first team since the tournament expanded to 64 teams in 1985 to win every game by at least 13 points. Their smallest margin of victory was against Miami (FL) in the Final Four, 72–59. UConn finished the season with a 31–8 overall record. After the season, Hawkins and Jackson Jr. were selected in the 2023 NBA draft as the No. 14 and No. 36 overall picks, respectively. Sanogo signed as an undrafted free agent with the Chicago Bulls. Following the NCAA tournament, numerous analysts and commentators declared that UConn had earned "blue blood" status in college basketball—placing the Huskies among the highest performing programs in the history of the sport.

==== 2023–24 Season: 'Back-to-Back', 6th NCAA Title ====
Despite losing two of its top scorers in Hawkins and Sanogo to the NBA, UConn entered the 2023–24 season ranked No. 6 in the preseason AP Top 25 poll. The team gained a 5-star recruit in point guard Stephon Castle as well as future First-Team All-Big East transfer Cam Spencer. Donovan Clingan became the starting center for the team and averaged 13 points per game throughout the season. The Huskies reached No. 4 in the AP after starting 7–0 and winning the Empire Classic championship at Madison Square Garden. On November 28, 2023, UConn won its 24th straight non-conference game by double digits, setting a new NCAA record. The team lost its first non-conference game in 624 days at No. 5 Kansas on December 1, 2023. The Huskies rebounded from the loss four days later with an 87–76 win over No. 9 North Carolina in the Jimmy V Classic. Coach Dan Hurley led UConn to a program-best 18 wins in Big East conference play, earning the Huskies their first Big East regular season title since 2006 and their 11th overall, a conference record. As the No. 1 seed in the Big East tournament, UConn defeated the No. 9 seed Xavier 87–60 in the quarterfinals and then defeated the No. 5 seed St. Johns 95–90 in the semifinals to advance to their first Big East championship game since 2011. The following day, the Huskies defeated the No. 3 seed Marquette 73–57 in the championship game to win their first Big East championship since 2011 and eighth overall.

UConn received the #1 overall seed for the first time ever in the 2024 NCAA tournament and ultimately won its second consecutive NCAA title, with a 75–60 win over #1 seed Purdue in the national championship game. The Huskies' scoring margin of +140 for their six games (23.3 points per game) is an NCAA Division I record. The team also set a record by winning every NCAA tournament game by at least 14 points, beating their own record from the previous season by 1 point. Their smallest margin of victory was against Alabama in the Final Four, 86–72. Tristen Newton was named the tournament's Most Outstanding Player, and Dan Hurley was named Naismith College Coach of the Year as well as Sporting News Men's College Basketball Coach of the Year. UConn finished the season with a 37–3 overall record, setting a program record with the most wins in a single season.

With a sixth NCAA championship, UConn moved into a tie for third most all time. ESPN's Jay Bilas said UConn's six national championships in 25 tournaments is the best run college basketball has seen since the John Wooden-era at UCLA in the 1960s and 1970s. After the season, Clingan, Castle, Karaban, Newton and Spencer declared for the 2024 NBA draft and were all invited to the NBA draft combine. Karaban, projected as an early second-round pick, opted to return to UConn for a third season. Castle and Clingan were selected in the first round of the draft as the No. 4 and No. 7 picks, respectively. Newton and Spencer were selected in the second round with picks No. 49 and No. 53.

==== 2025–26 Season: First Title Game Loss, 8th Final Four ====
After the 2024–25 season ended in the second round of the NCAA tournament with a loss to eventual champion Florida, UConn entered the 2025–26 season having lost 5-star recruit Liam McNeeley to the NBA draft, as well as Hassan Diarra and Samson Johnson to graduation. The Huskies added Dayton transfer Malachi Smith and Georgia transfer Silas Demary Jr., while also bringing in a 2025 recruiting class that included 5-star prospect Braylon Mullins. UConn improved significantly on the prior season and was one of the stronger teams in the country all year. The team finished 34–6 overall and 17–3 in Big East play, placing second in the conference.

The Huskies opened the year with several notable non-conference wins, including victories over No. 7 BYU, No. 13 Illinois, No. 21 Kansas, No. 18 Florida, and Texas, with their only loss of non-conference play being to No. 4 Arizona (71–67) on November 19th, a game in which starters Tarris Reed Jr. and Braylon Mullins were out due to injury. UConn started Big East play with a 12-game win streak, though a loss at No. 22 St. John’s and Quad-3 losses to Creighton and Marquette left the Huskies in second place by the end of the conference schedule. Tarris Reed led the team in scoring, rebounding, and blocks, averaging 14.7 points, 9.0 rebounds, and 2.0 blocks per game, while Silas Demary Jr. led the team in assists and steals at 5.9 and 1.6 per game. Alex Karaban averaged 13.2 points and 5.3 rebounds per game, Solo Ball averaged 12.8 points, and Braylon Mullins averaged 12.0 points (did not start playing until early December due to injury).

In the Big East tournament, UConn defeated Xavier and Georgetown to reach the championship game, where they lost to No. 13 St. John's, 72–52. UConn was awarded a #2 seed in the NCAA tournament and advanced through #15 seed Furman, #7 seed UCLA, #3 seed Michigan State, and the #1 overall seed Duke to reach their 8th Final Four. The team's Elite Eight win over Duke has widely been described as one of the greatest games in March Madness history, as the Huskies overcame a 19-point deficit during the 2nd half that ultimately culminated in a 35-foot three-point shot by Braylon Mullins with 0.4 seconds remaining to defeat the Blue Devils, 73–72. In the National semifinals, UConn defeated #3 seed Illinois 71–62 to advance to their seventh national championship game in program history. The season ended with a 69–63 loss to #1 seed Michigan in the title game, in which Karaban recorded 17 points and 11 rebounds and Reed added 13 points and 14 rebounds. This was UConn's first ever loss in a national championship game (ending a record 6–0 winning streak in title games) and was also the programs first loss in a game past the 2nd round of the NCAA tournament since their 2009 Final Four loss to Michigan State, ending a 19-game win streak in the Sweet Sixteen or later (an NCAA record).

== Facilities ==
- Hawley Armory (1915–1947)
- Storrs Cage (1948–1954)
- Hugh S. Greer Field House (1954–1990)
- PeoplesBank Arena originally known as the Hartford Civic Center and formerly as the XL Center (1975–present)
- Harry A. Gampel Pavilion (1990–present)
- Werth Family Champions Center (2014–present)

Like several other programs in the Big East, UConn splits their home schedule between on-campus Gampel Pavilion and a larger professional-standard arena, in this case PeoplesBank Arena in Hartford (roughly 25 miles from the Storrs campus). However, unlike many of these programs who primarily play non-conference games and occasionally some less-popular Big East opponents on campus, the Huskies divide their home games roughly equally between the two arenas and do not reserve marquee games for Hartford. The athletic department sells separate ticket packages for Storrs and Hartford games and runs a free shuttle bus service for students to attend games at PeoplesBank Arena.

UConn's basketball programs train at the Werth Family Champions Center, constructed on the site of Memorial Stadium, which previously hosted the football team before their move to Rentschler Field in East Hartford. The $40 million facility consists of two identical wings for the men's and women's teams. Both wings feature a full basketball court, two breakout half-court areas and a foul-shooting lane, dressing rooms and player lounges, medical facilities, and state-of-the-art strength training gyms. Shared facilities within the building include academic support areas, meeting spaces, and a cafeteria.

== Postseason results ==
=== Regular season conference championships ===
UConn has won 34 conference regular season championships over the past century. The program currently holds the record for the most Big East regular season titles (11) and Yankee Conference regular season titles (18).

New England Conference (5)

- 1925, 1926, 1928, 1941, 1944

Yankee Conference (18)

- 1948, 1949, 1951, 1952, 1953, 1954, 1955, 1956, 1957, 1958, 1959, 1960, 1963, 1964, 1965, 1966, 1967, 1970

Big East Conference (11)

- 1990, 1994, 1995, 1996, 1998, 1999, 2002, 2003, 2005, 2006, 2024

=== Conference tournament championships ===
For much of the 20th century, UConn was a member of conferences that did not hold a postseason tournament (New England and Yankee). The advent of the ECAC men's basketball tournaments in the 1974–75 season provided UConn with its first opportunity to win a postseason conference championship. Over the past half century, UConn has won 11 conference tournament titles. The program is currently tied with Georgetown for the most Big East tournament championships (8) all time.

ECAC New England Tournament (2)

- 1976, 1979

Big East Conference Tournament (8)

- 1990, 1996, 1998, 1999, 2002, 2004, 2011, 2024

American Athletic Conference Tournament (1)

- 2016

=== NCAA tournament seeding history ===
The NCAA began seeding the tournament with the 1979 edition.

| Year → | '79 | '90 | '91 | '92 | '94 | '95 | '96† | '98 | '99 | '00 | '02 | '03 | '04 | '05 | '06 | '08 | '09 | '11 | '12 | '14 | '16 | '21 | '22 | '23 | '24 | '25 | '26 |
|---|---|---|---|---|---|---|---|---|---|---|---|---|---|---|---|---|---|---|---|---|---|---|---|---|---|---|---|
| Seed → | 5 | 1 | 11 | 9 | 2 | 2 | 1 | 2 | 1 | 5 | 2 | 5 | 2 | 2 | 1 | 4 | 1 | 3 | 9 | 7 | 9 | 7 | 5 | 4 | 1* | 8 | 2 |

#

Indicates NCAA championship

* Indicates overall number one seed

† Indicates vacated by the NCAA

=== NCAA Final Fours ===
- 1999 – Champion
- 2004 – Champion
- 2009 – Semifinalist
- 2011 – Champion
- 2014 – Champion
- 2023 – Champion
- 2024 – Champion
- 2026 – Runner-up

=== National Championships ===
==== 1999 NCAA Title ====
The Huskies were the top seed in the West region, and a win over Gonzaga in the regional final sent UConn to Tropicana Field for the program's first Final Four appearance. They defeated Ohio State 64–58 in the National Semifinals to advance to play against Duke in the National Championship. Despite having been ranked No. 1 for half of the year, the Huskies entered the national championship game as 9-point underdogs.

UConn won their first national title with a 77–74 victory. Richard Hamilton was named the tournament's Most Outstanding Player.

1999 NCAA Tournament
| Round | Opponent | Score |
|---|---|---|
| Round #1 | #16 Texas-San Antonio | 91–66 |
| Round #2 | #9 New Mexico | 78–56 |
| Sweet 16 | #5 Iowa | 78–68 |
| Elite 8 | #10 Gonzaga | 67–62 |
| Final Four | #4 Ohio State | 64–58 |
| Championship | #1 Duke | 77–74 |

==== 2004 NCAA Title ====
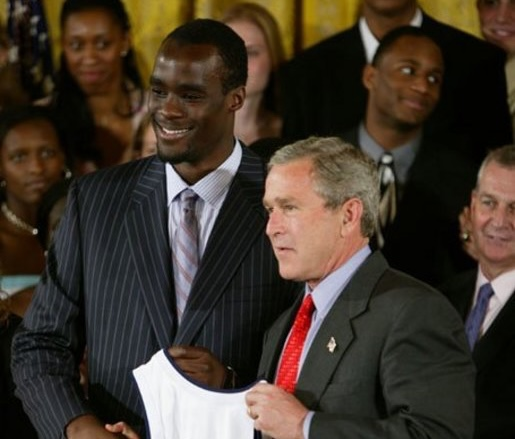
The 2004 UConn national championship team at the White House

In 2004, the Huskies returned to the Final Four. Once again they faced Duke, this time in the National Semifinal, and used a late run to beat the Blue Devils 79–78. Two nights later, led by Emeka Okafor and Ben Gordon, Connecticut won their second national title with an 82–73 victory over Georgia Tech. Okafor was named the tournament's Most Outstanding Player.

One day later the UConn women's basketball team also won a national title, making UConn the first and only school in NCAA Division I history to have its men's and women's basketball programs win a national championship in the same season.

2004 NCAA Tournament
| Round | Opponent | Score |
|---|---|---|
| Round #1 | #15 Vermont | 70–53 |
| Round #2 | #7 DePaul | 72–55 |
| Sweet 16 | #6 Vanderbilt | 73–53 |
| Elite 8 | #8 Alabama | 87–71 |
| Final Four | #1 Duke | 79–78 |
| Championship | #3 Georgia Tech | 82–73 |

==== 2011 NCAA Title ====
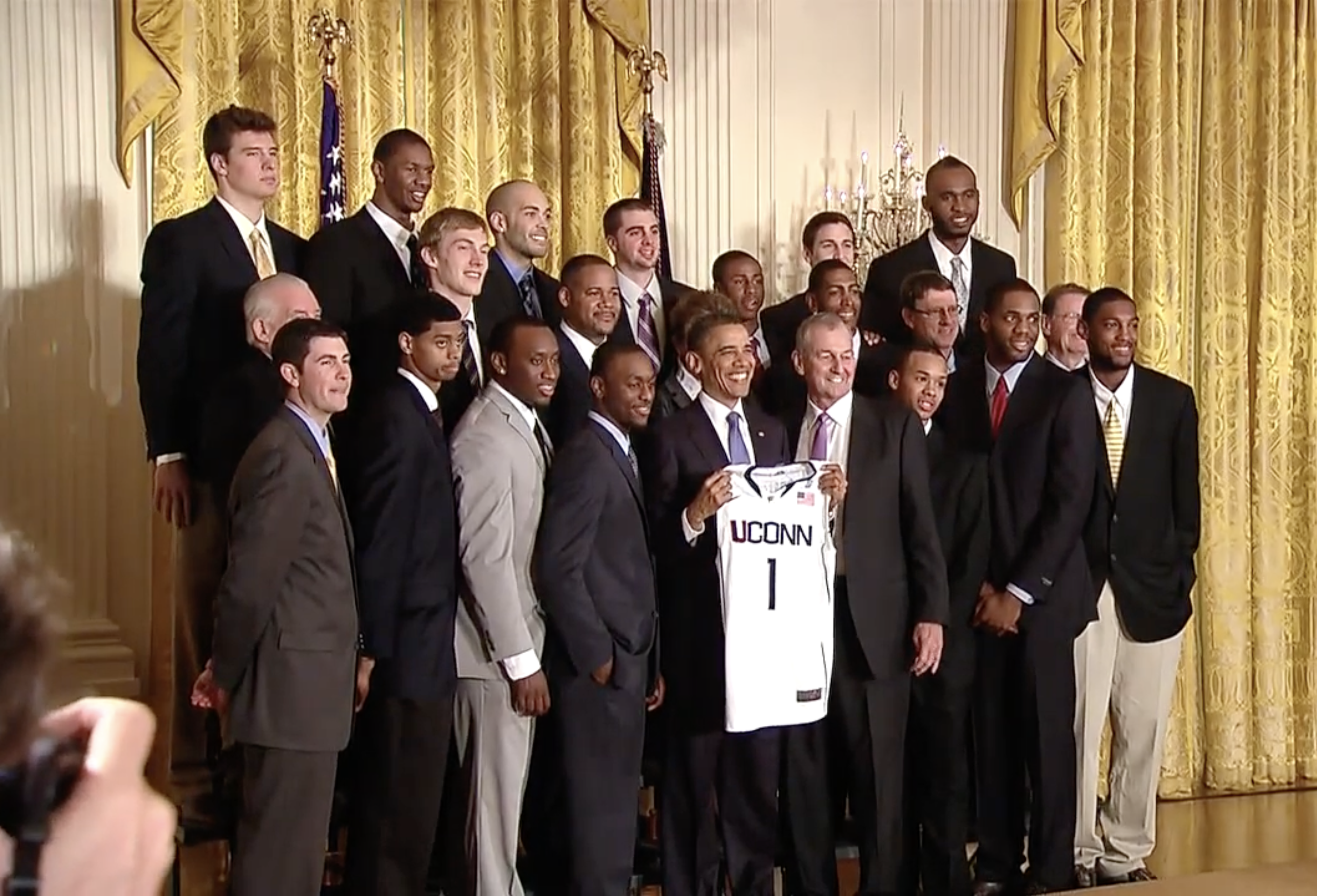
The 2011 UConn national championship team at the White House

The 2011 Huskies won 11 straight games in postseason play, the final six of which resulted in the program's third national championship. On April 4, 2011, they defeated the Butler Bulldogs, 53–41. UConn junior Kemba Walker was named the tournament's Most Outstanding Player.

Many consider UConn's win in the Championship Game to be a great defensive performance, as the Huskies held Butler to only 18.8% shooting from the field (a record for field goal percentage defense in a championship game) and tied a title game record with ten blocked shots. An analysis by Sports Illustrated columnist Luke Winn credited the Huskies' defense by demonstrating, for instance, that they blocked or altered a staggering 26.6% of Butler's shots – compared to just 3.8% by Pittsburgh and 12.1% by VCU in earlier rounds. The 53 points scored by Connecticut were, in turn, the lowest point total by a winning team in a championship game since 1949.

2011 NCAA Tournament
| Round | Opponent | Score |
|---|---|---|
| Round #1 | #14 Bucknell | 81–52 |
| Round #2 | #6 Cincinnati | 69–58 |
| Sweet 16 | #2 San Diego State | 74–67 |
| Elite 8 | #5 Arizona | 65–63 |
| Final Four | #4 Kentucky | 56–55 |
| Championship | #8 Butler | 53–41 |

==== 2014 NCAA Title ====
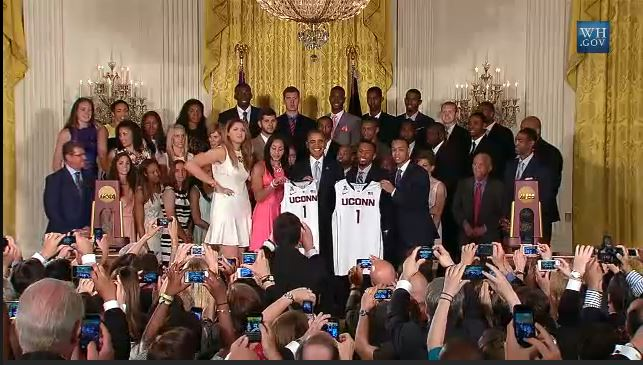
The 2014 UConn national championship team at the White House

In 2014, led by American Athletic Conference Player of the Year Shabazz Napier, UConn became the first #7 seed to win the NCAA Championship, getting past No. 1 seed Florida, No. 2 seed Villanova, No. 3 seed Iowa State, and No. 4 seed Michigan State, before defeating the Kentucky Wildcats 60–54 in the championship game in Arlington, Texas. UConn is undefeated in the state of Texas in the Final Four (6–0).

As in 2004, the UConn women's basketball team also won a national title, making UConn the first and only school in NCAA Division I history to have its men's and women's basketball programs win a national championship in the same season twice.

2014 NCAA Tournament
| Round | Opponent | Score |
|---|---|---|
| Round #1 | #10 Saint Joseph's | 89–81 ^{OT} |
| Round #2 | #2 Villanova | 77–65 |
| Sweet 16 | #3 Iowa State | 81–76 |
| Elite 8 | #4 Michigan State | 60–54 |
| Final Four | #1 Florida | 63–53 |
| Championship | #8 Kentucky | 60–54 |

==== 2023 NCAA Title ====
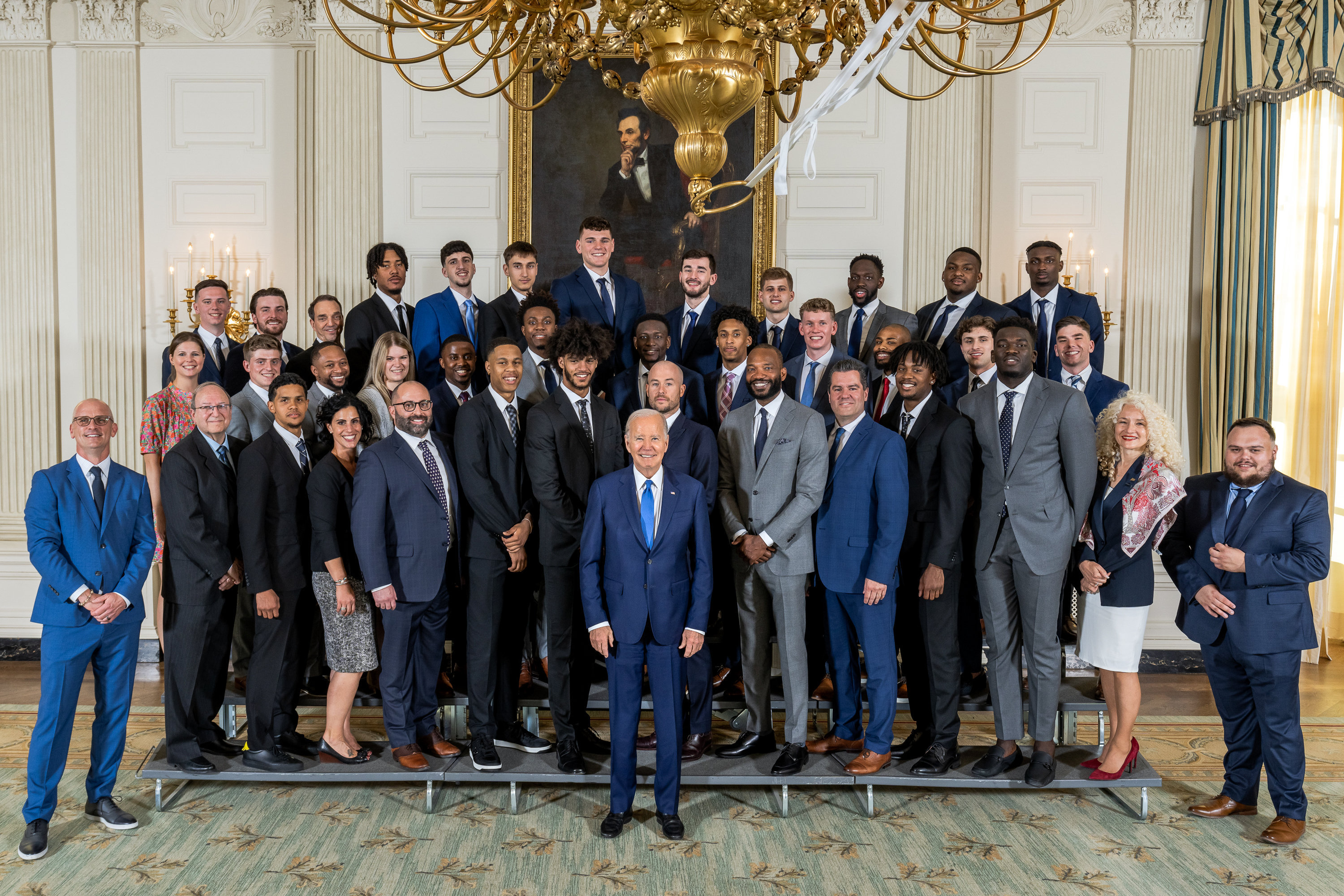
The 2023 UConn national championship team at the White House

In 2023, the UConn Huskies won all of their tournament games by more than 10 points. Their path to the championship began against No. 13 seed Iona in the first round, in which they would trail at the half but eventually pull away in the end. The Huskies would then beat No. 5 Saint Mary's, No. 8 Arkansas, and No. 3 Gonzaga. The national semifinal would be a 13-point defeat of No. 5 Miami, their smallest margin of victory in the tournament.

The national championship would be a 17-point defeat of No. 5 San Diego State University as UConn won their fifth national title, moving the program into a tie for fourth-most NCAA championships all time.

2023 NCAA Tournament
| Round | Opponent | Score |
|---|---|---|
| Round #1 | #13 Iona | 87–63 |
| Round #2 | #5 Saint Mary's | 70–55 |
| Sweet 16 | #8 Arkansas | 88–65 |
| Elite 8 | #3 Gonzaga | 82–54 |
| Final Four | #5 Miami | 72–59 |
| Championship | #5 San Diego State | 76–59 |

==== 2024 NCAA Title ====
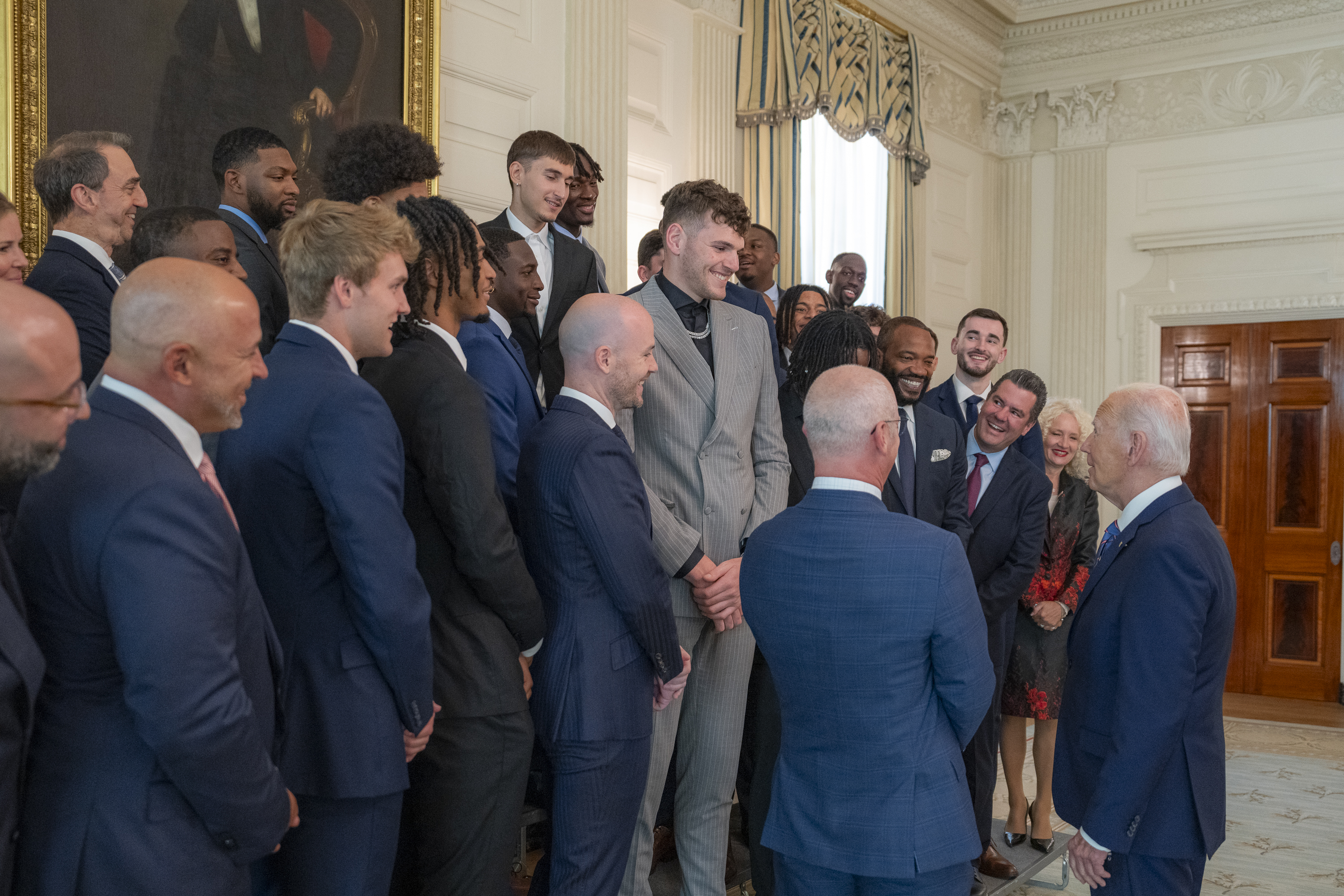
The 2024 UConn national championship team at the White House

In 2024, the UConn Huskies became the first team to repeat as NCAA tournament champions since the Florida Gators in 2007. They won their sixth title, putting them at a tie with North Carolina for the third-most championships of all time. Once again, they won every tournament game by double digits; their smallest margin of victory in the entire tournament was 14 points against Alabama in the Final Four. The Huskies also set the record for the largest combined margin of victory in all their games with 140 points; and largest-average margin of victory of 23.3 points per game. Because of that, the 2024 Huskies are considered one of the most dominant teams in the history of March Madness, following up 2023's strong performance.

2024 NCAA Tournament
| Round | Opponent | Score |
|---|---|---|
| Round #1 | #16 Stetson | 91–52 |
| Round #2 | #9 Northwestern | 75–58 |
| Sweet 16 | #5 San Diego State | 82–52 |
| Elite 8 | #3 Illinois | 77–52 |
| Final Four | #4 Alabama | 86–72 |
| Championship | #1 Purdue | 75–60 |

=== Complete NCAA tournament results ===
The Huskies have appeared in the NCAA tournament 39 times. Their combined record is 77–34. They have been to seven Final Fours and are six-time National Champions (1999, 2004, 2011, 2014, 2023, 2024).

| Year | Seed | Round | Opponent | Result |
|---|---|---|---|---|
| 1951 | N/A | Sweet Sixteen | St. John's | L 52–63 |
| 1954 | N/A | First Round | Navy | L 80–85 |
| 1956 | N/A | First Round; Sweet Sixteen; Regional 3rd Place Game | Manhattan; Temple; Dartmouth | W 84–75; L 59–65; L 64–85 |
| 1957 | N/A | First Round | Syracuse | L 76–82 |
| 1958 | N/A | First Round | Dartmouth | L 64–75 |
| 1959 | N/A | First Round | Boston University | L 58–60 |
| 1960 | N/A | First Round | NYU | L 59–78 |
| 1963 | N/A | First Round | West Virginia | L 71–77 |
| 1964 | N/A | First Round; Sweet Sixteen; Elite Eight | Temple; Princeton; Duke | W 53–48; W 52–50; L 54–101 |
| 1965 | N/A | First Round | Saint Joseph's | L 61–67 |
| 1967 | N/A | First Round | Boston College | L 42–48 |
| 1976 | N/A | First Round; Sweet Sixteen | Hofstra; Rutgers | W 80–79^{OT} L 79–93 |
| 1979 | #5 | Second Round | #4 Syracuse | L 81–89 |
| 1990 | #1 | First Round; Second Round; Sweet Sixteen; Elite Eight | #16 Boston University #9 California #5 Clemson #3 Duke | W 76–52; W 74–54; W 71–70; L 78–79^{OT} |
| 1991 | #11 | First Round; Second Round; Sweet Sixteen | #6 LSU #14 Xavier #2 Duke | W 79–62; W 66–50; L 67–81 |
| 1992 | #9 | First Round; Second Round | #8 Nebraska #1 Ohio State | W 86–65; L 55–78 |
| 1994 | #2 | First Round; Second Round; Sweet Sixteen | #15 Rider #10 George Washington #3 Florida | W 64–46; W 75–63; L 60–69^{OT} |
| 1995 | #2 | First Round; Second Round; Sweet Sixteen; Elite Eight | #15 Chattanooga #7 Cincinnati #3 Maryland #1 UCLA | W 100–71; W 96–91; W 99–89; L 96–102 |
| 1996* | #1 | First Round; Second Round; Sweet Sixteen | #16 Colgate #9 Eastern Michigan #5 Mississippi State | W 68–59; W 95–81; L 55–60 |
| 1998 | #2 | First Round; Second Round; Sweet Sixteen; Elite Eight | #15 Fairleigh Dickinson #7 Indiana #11 Washington #1 North Carolina | W 93–85; W 78–68; W 75–74; L 64–75 |
| 1999 | #1 | First Round; Second Round; Sweet Sixteen; Elite Eight; Final Four; National Championship | #16 UTSA #9 New Mexico #5 Iowa #10 Gonzaga #4 Ohio State #1 Duke | W 91–66; W 78–56; W 78–68; W 67–62; W 64–58; W 77–74 |
| 2000 | #5 | First Round; Second Round | #12 Utah State #4 Tennessee | W 75–67; L 51–65 |
| 2002 | #2 | First Round; Second Round; Sweet Sixteen; Elite Eight | #15 Hampton #7 NC State #11 Southern Illinois #1 Maryland | W 78–67; W 77–74; W 71–59; L 82–90 |
| 2003 | #5 | First Round; Second Round; Sweet Sixteen | #12 BYU #4 Stanford #1 Texas | W 58–53; W 85–74; L 78–82 |
| 2004 | #2 | First Round; Second Round; Sweet Sixteen; Elite Eight; Final Four; National Championship | #15 Vermont #7 DePaul #6 Vanderbilt #8 Alabama #1 Duke #3 Georgia Tech | W 70–53; W 72–55; W 73–53; W 87–71; W 79–78; W 82–73 |
| 2005 | #2 | First Round; Second Round | #15 UCF #10 NC State | W 77–71; L 62–65 |
| 2006 | #1 | First Round; Second Round; Sweet Sixteen; Elite Eight | #16 Albany #8 Kentucky #5 Washington #11 George Mason | W 72–59; W 87–83; W 98–92^{OT} L 84–86^{OT} |
| 2008 | #4 | First Round | #13 San Diego | L 69–70^{OT} |
| 2009 | #1 | First Round; Second Round; Sweet Sixteen; Elite Eight; Final Four | #16 Chattanooga #9 Texas A&M #5 Purdue #3 Missouri #2 Michigan State | W 103–47; W 92–66; W 72–60; W 82–75; L 73–82 |
| 2011 | #3 | First Round; Second Round; Sweet Sixteen; Elite Eight; Final Four; National Championship | #14 Bucknell #6 Cincinnati #2 San Diego State #5 Arizona #4 Kentucky #8 Butler | W 81–52; W 69–58; W 74–67; W 65–63; W 56–55; W 53–41 |
| 2012 | #9 | First Round | #8 Iowa State | L 64–77 |
| 2014 | #7 | First Round; Second Round; Sweet Sixteen; Elite Eight; Final Four; National Championship | #10 Saint Joseph's #2 Villanova #3 Iowa State #4 Michigan State #1 Florida #8 Kentucky | W 89–81^{OT} W 77–65; W 81–76; W 60–54; W 63–53; W 60–54 |
| 2016 | #9 | First Round; Second Round | #8 Colorado #1 Kansas | W 74–67; L 61–73 |
| 2021 | #7 | First Round | #10 Maryland | L 54–63 |
| 2022 | #5 | First Round | #12 New Mexico State | L 63–70 |
| 2023 | #4 | First Round; Second Round; Sweet Sixteen; Elite Eight; Final Four; National Championship | #13 Iona #5 Saint Mary's #8 Arkansas #3 Gonzaga #5 Miami #5 San Diego State | W 87–63; W 70–55; W 88–65; W 82–54; W 72–59; W 76–59 |
| 2024 | #1 | First Round; Second Round; Sweet Sixteen; Elite Eight; Final Four; National Championship | #16 Stetson #9 Northwestern #5 San Diego State #3 Illinois #4 Alabama #1 Purdue | W 91–52; W 75–58; W 82–52; W 77–52; W 86–72; W 75–60 |
| 2025 | #8 | First Round; Second Round | #9 Oklahoma #1 Florida | W 67–59; L 75–77 |
| 2026 | #2 | First Round; Second Round; Sweet Sixteen; Elite Eight; Final Four; National Championship | #15 Furman #7 UCLA #3 Michigan State #1 Duke #3 Illinois #1 Michigan | W 82–71; W 73–57; W 67–63; W 73–72; W 71–62; L 69–63 |

*NCAA vacated all of UConn's games in 1996 NCAA Division I men's basketball tournament. Totals above do not include vacated games.

=== NIT results ===
The Huskies have appeared in the National Invitation Tournament (NIT) 13 times. Their combined record is 15–12. They were NIT champions in 1988.

| Year | Round | Opponent | Results |
|---|---|---|---|
| 1955 | First Round | Saint Louis | L 103–110 |
| 1974 | First Round; Quarterfinals | St. John's; Boston College | W 82–70; L 75–76 |
| 1975 | First Round | South Carolina | L 61–71 |
| 1980 | First Round | Saint Peter's | L 56–71 |
| 1981 | First Round; Second Round | South Florida; Minnesota | W 66–55; L 66–84 |
| 1982 | First Round | Dayton | L 75–76 |
| 1988 | First Round; Second Round; Quarterfinals; Semifinals; Final | West Virginia; Louisiana Tech; VCU; Boston College; Ohio State | W 62–57; W 65–59; W 69–60; W 73–67; W 72–67 |
| 1989 | First Round; Second Round; Quarterfinals | Charlotte; California; UAB | W 67–62; W 73–72; L 79–85 |
| 1993 | First Round | Jackson State | L 88–90 |
| 1997 | First Round; Second Round; Quarterfinals; Semifinals; 3rd Place Game | Iona; Bradley; Nebraska; Florida State; Arkansas | W 71–66; W 63–47; W 76–67; L 65–71; W 74–64 |
| 2001 | First Round; Second Round | South Carolina; Detroit | W 72–65; L 61–67 |
| 2010 | First Round; Second Round | Northeastern; Virginia Tech | W 59–57; L 63–65 |
| 2015 | First Round | Arizona State | L 61–68 |

== Coaches ==
The following is a list of Connecticut Huskies men's basketball head coaches. The team is currently coached by Dan Hurley, alongside associate head coach Kimani Young and assistant coaches Mike Pegues and Mike Nardi.

| Tenure | Coach | Years | Record | Pct. |
|---|---|---|---|---|
| 1900–1915 | No coach | 15 | 42–43 | .494 |
| 1915–1919 | John F. Donahue | 4 | 11–23 | .324 |
| 1919–1921 | M. Ross Swartz | 2 | 14–14 | .500 |
| 1921–1922 | J. Wilder Tasker | 2 | 15–5 | .750 |
| 1922–1923 | Roy J. Guyer | 1 | 8–6 | .571 |
| 1923–1927 | Sumner Dole | 4 | 39–25 | .609 |
| 1927–1931 | Louis Alexander | 4 | 35–19 | .648 |
| 1931–1936 | John Heldman Jr. | 5 | 19–42 | .311 |
| 1935–1936 | J. Orlean Christian (interim) | 1 | 3–10 | .231 |
| 1936–1945 | Don White | 9 | 94–59 | .614 |
| 1945–1946 | Blair Gullion | 2 | 15–8 | .652 |
| 1946–1963 | Hugh S. Greer | 17 | 286–112 | .719 |
| 1963 | George Wigton (interim) | 1 | 11–4 | .733 |
| 1963–1967 | Fred Shabel | 4 | 72–29 | .713 |
| 1967–1969 | Burr Carlson | 2 | 16–32 | .333 |
| 1969–1977 | Donald "Dee" Rowe | 8 | 120–88 | .577 |
| 1977–1986 | Dominic "Dom" Perno | 9 | 139–114 | .549 |
| 1986–2012 | Jim Calhoun | 26 | 629–245 | .720 |
| 2012–2018 | Kevin Ollie | 6 | 113–79 | .588 |
| 2018–present | Dan Hurley | 8 | 199–75 | .726 |

Note: Records updated through end of 2025–26 season.

== Retired numbers ==
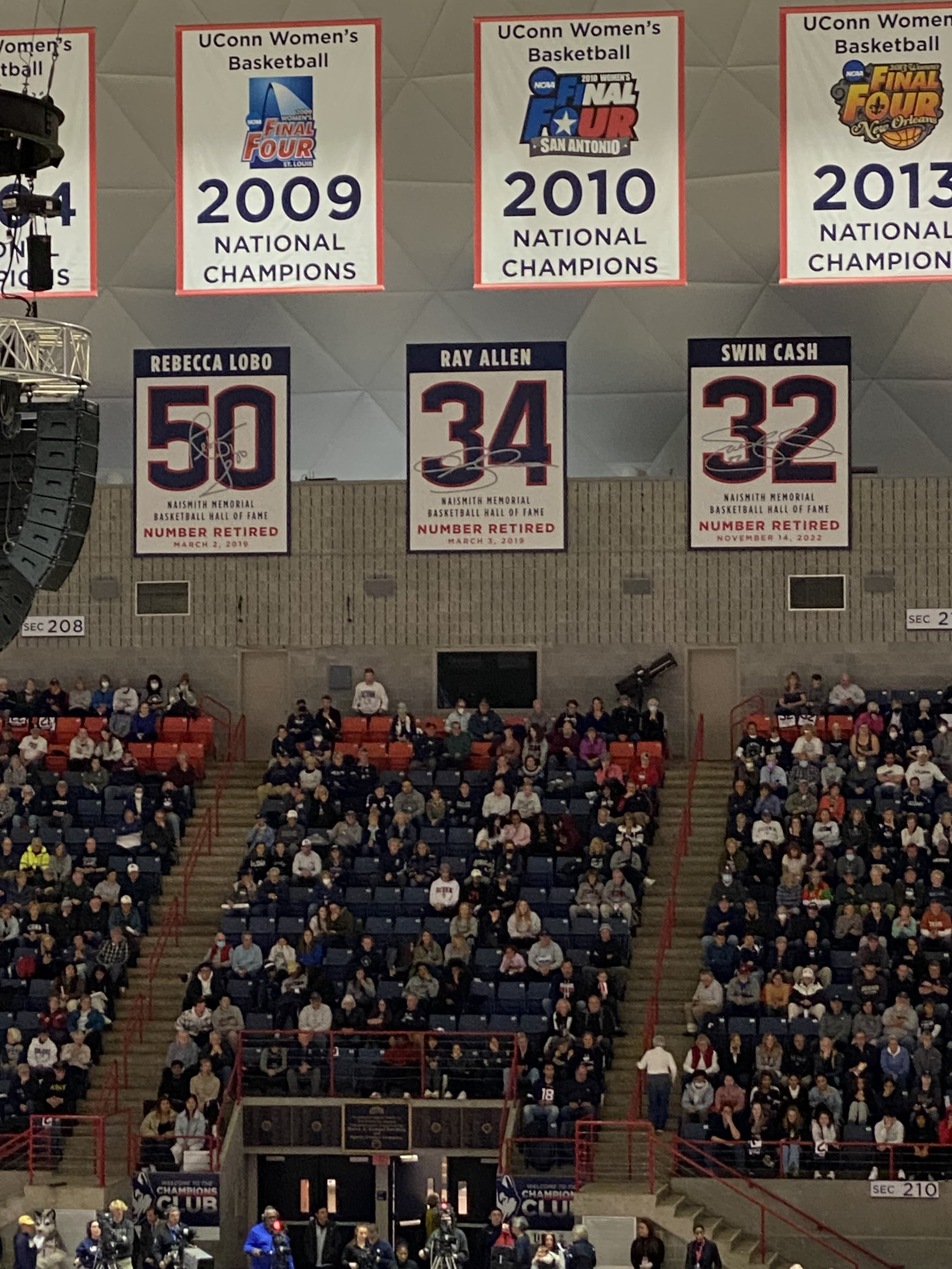
Ray Allen's #34, center, in the rafters at Gampel Pavilion

UConn Huskies retired numbers
| No. | Player | Position | Tenure |
|---|---|---|---|
| 32 | Richard Hamilton | SG | 1996–1999 |
| 34 | Ray Allen | SG | 1993–1996 |
| 50 | Emeka Okafor | C | 2001–2004 |

Three men's basketball players have had their numbers retired at UConn. For more than a century, UConn's basketball programs did not have any retired numbers. On December 7, 2018, UConn announced that the No. 34 worn by Ray Allen—along with the No. 50 worn by UConn women's basketball star Rebecca Lobo—would be the first-ever to be permanently retired for each respective team. Allen and Lobo were the first players in school history inducted into the Naismith Memorial Basketball Hall of Fame. Allen's number retirement ceremony was held at Gampel Pavilion on March 3, 2019.

On January 30, 2024, UConn announced that the No. 32 worn by Richard Hamilton would be the second number retired by the program. Hamilton's number retirement ceremony was held at Gampel Pavilion on February 24, 2024.

On February 9, 2026, UConn announced that Emeka Okafor's No. 50 would be retired at halftime of the Huskies' February 18 game against Creighton at Gampel Pavilion.

== Huskies of Honor ==
The Huskies of Honor program recognizes the top players, coaches and administrators in the history of UConn men's and women's basketball. On December 26, 2006, the university announced the inaugural class, which included 13 players and 3 coaches from the men's basketball program. The men's basketball inaugural class was formally inducted in a ceremony on February 5, 2007. Former athletic director John Toner was inducted on February 28, 2009. On April 5, 2011, Kemba Walker was the first men's basketball player to be added to the program since the inaugural inductees, an honor he was bestowed after leading the team to a national championship.

The Huskies of Honor are each recognized by a four by five foot panel which displays his name, jersey number and years of service, and a plaque which summarizes each's career accomplishments; Both the panels and the plaques are on permanent display at Gampel Pavilion on the main campus of the University of Connecticut in Storrs.

=== Players ===
- Harrison Fitch, 1932–1934
- Walt Dropo, 1942–1947
- Vincent Yokabaskas, 1948–1952
- Worthy Patterson, 1951–1954
- Art Quimby, 1951–1955
- Toby Kimball, 1961–1965
- Wes Bialosuknia, 1964–1967
- Bill Corley, 1965–1968
- Tony Hanson, 1973–1977
- Corny Thompson, 1978–1982
- Clifford Robinson, 1985–1989
- Chris Smith, 1988–1992
- Scott Burrell, 1989–1993
- Donyell Marshall, 1991–1994
- Ray Allen, 1993–1996
- Richard Hamilton, 1996–1999
- Khalid El-Amin, 1997–2000
- Caron Butler, 2000–2002
- Emeka Okafor, 2001–2004
- Ben Gordon, 2001–2004
- Rudy Gay, 2004–2006
- Hasheem Thabeet, 2006–2009
- Kemba Walker, 2008–2011
- Shabazz Napier, 2010–2014
- Tristen Newton, 2022–2024
- Alex Karaban, 2022–2026

=== Coaches and administrators ===
- Hugh Greer, head coach, 1946–1963
- Dee Rowe, head coach, 1969–1977
- John Toner, athletic director, 1969–1987
- Jim Calhoun, head coach, 1986–2012

=== Teams ===
- 1999 National Championship Team
- 2004 National Championship Team

== Huskies in the NBA ==
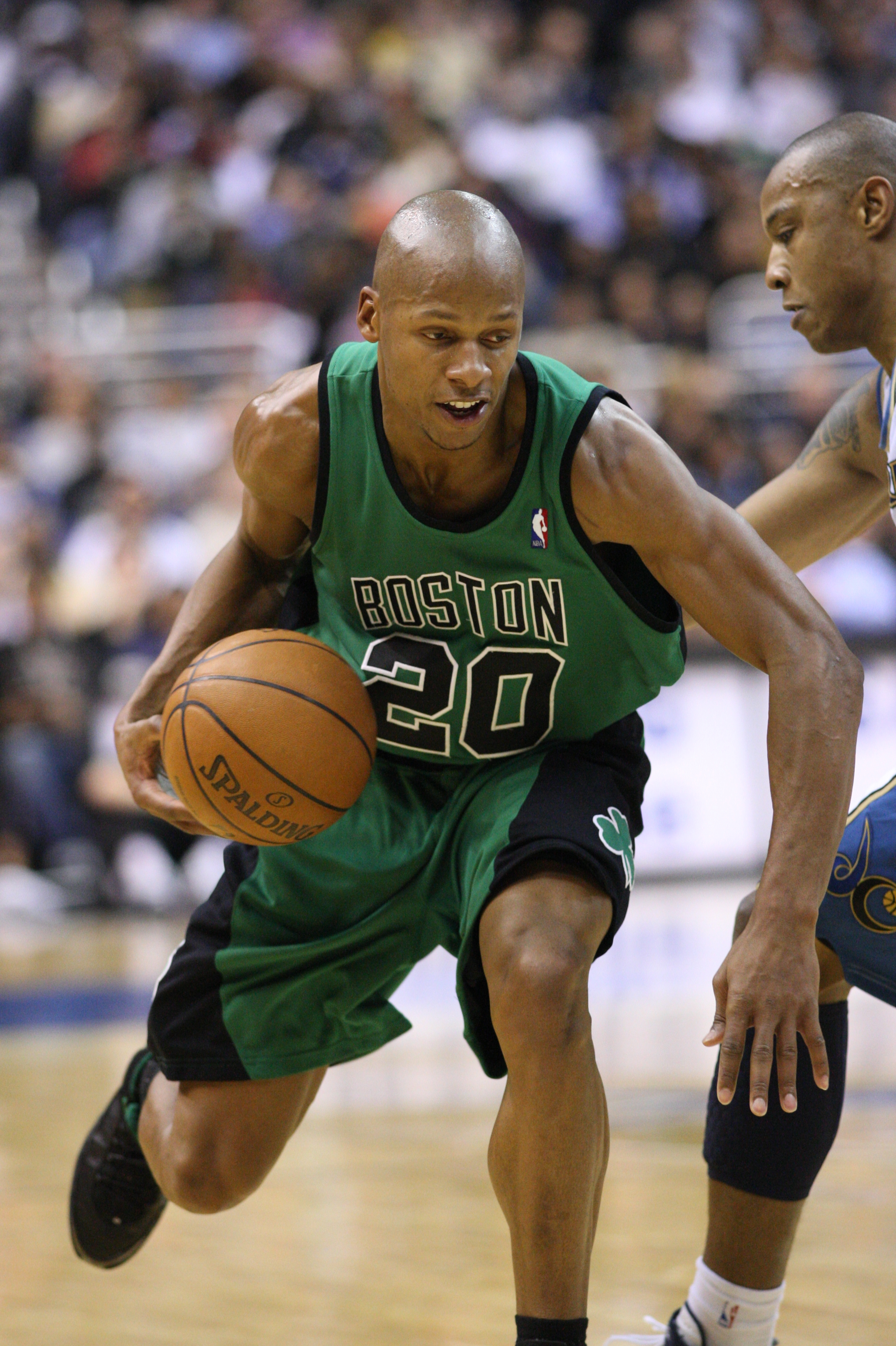
Ray Allen, 10-time NBA All-Star and Naismith Memorial Basketball Hall of Fame inductee

Since the creation of the National Basketball Association in 1946, more than 40 former UConn stars have played in the league. Thirteen of them have received NBA honors and awards, and five have won an NBA championship. While the league has shown an interest in UConn's top players since the first NBA draft in 1947, the Huskies emerged as a consistent talent pipeline to the professional level in the 1990s.

UConn has produced some of the greatest players in NBA history, nearly all in the past three decades. The list of former UConn players in the NBA includes:

- **Ray Allen**, a 10-time NBA All-Star who won two NBA championships and retired as the NBA's all-time leader in 3-point field goals made. He was inducted into the Naismith Memorial Basketball Hall of Fame in 2018. In 2021, Allen was named to the NBA 75th Anniversary Team, which honored the 75 greatest players in NBA history. ESPN ranked him as the 47th greatest NBA player all time in 2021.
- **Richard Hamilton**, a three-time NBA All-Star and leading scorer on the Detroit Pistons for eight consecutive seasons—including during the team's run to the NBA championship in 2004. The Pistons retired his number in 2017.
- **Kemba Walker**, a four-time NBA All-Star and the all-time leading scorer for the Charlotte Hornets. Walker is widely regarded as the greatest player in the history of the Hornets franchise.
- **Andre Drummond**, a two-time NBA All-Star and four-time winner of the NBA rebounding title. He has the highest rebounding percentage of any player in NBA history.
- **Clifford Robinson**, an NBA All-Star and 1994 NBA Sixth Man of the Year who was one of the first 3-point shooting big men in NBA history. A two-time NBA All-Defensive Team selection, Robinson is one of only seven players in NBA/ABA history to record 1,300 blocks and 1,300 steals. He played in 1,380 career games, 14th most in NBA history. His teams appeared in the playoffs in all but one of his 18 seasons in the league.
- **Caron Butler**, a two-time NBA All-Star who averaged double figures in scoring 11 out of 14 seasons in the league and retired with the seventh-most steals in Washington Wizards franchise history. He won an NBA championship in 2011 with the Dallas Mavericks.
- **Ben Gordon**, the 2005 NBA Sixth Man of the Year and the only player in NBA history to win the award as a rookie. He retired with the Chicago Bulls franchise record for most 3-point field goals made in a single season (166) and the NBA record for most consecutive 3-point field goals without a miss (9), which he accomplished twice in his career.
- **Emeka Okafor**, the 2005 NBA Rookie of the Year who became the first star of the NBA's expansion franchise in Charlotte, then known as the Bobcats. He is the all-time leading rebounder in Charlotte Hornets franchise history.
- **Rudy Gay**, a 17-year NBA veteran who is considered one of the greatest players in league history to never receive an NBA All-Star selection. He ranks as one of the top players in the history of the Memphis Grizzlies franchise, and was the league's most clutch shooter in late-game situations during the first 10 years of his career.

In 2011, SLAM Magazine included Allen, Hamilton, Robinson, Butler, Gordon and Okafor on its list of the 500 Greatest NBA Players of All Time.

=== NBA draft ===
There have been 59 former UConn players selected in the NBA draft, including 27 first-round picks and 17 lottery picks. Walt Dropo was the first UConn player to be drafted—selected with the fourth overall pick in the inaugural draft in 1947—but ultimately chose to play professional baseball instead. In the 2006 NBA draft, the Huskies tied the record for most first-round picks from one school (4) and tied the second-highest number of picks from one school in a single NBA draft (5).

UConn Players in the NBA Draft
| Player | Year | Round | Pick | Team |
|---|---|---|---|---|
| Walt Dropo | 1947 | 1 | 4 | Providence Steamrollers |
| Burr Carlson | 1952 | 5 | 44 | Philadelphia Warriors |
| Jim Ahearn | 1955 | 10 | 74 | Boston Celtics |
| Art Quimby | 1955 | 11 | 80 | Rochester Royals |
| Toby Kimball | 1965 | 3 | 26 | Boston Celtics |
| Wes Bialosuknia | 1967 | 4 | 37 | St. Louis Hawks |
| Bill Corley | 1968 | 19 | 208 | San Diego Rockets |
| Jimmy Foster | 1974 | 4 | 57 | Cleveland Cavaliers |
| John Thomas | 1976 | 9 | 141 | Chicago Bulls |
| Tony Hanson | 1977 | 3 | 50 | New Orleans Jazz |
| Jim Abromaitis | 1979 | 5 | 95 | New Jersey Nets |
| Corny Thompson | 1982 | 3 | 50 | Dallas Mavericks |
| Chuck Aleksinas | 1982 | 4 | 76 | Chicago Bulls |
| Mike McKay | 1982 | 5 | 95 | Utah Jazz |
| Bruce Kuczenski | 1983 | 3 | 59 | New Jersey Nets |
| Earl Kelley | 1986 | 5 | 102 | San Antonio Spurs |
| Clifford Robinson | 1989 | 2 | 36 | Portland Trail Blazers |
| Tate George | 1990 | 1 | 22 | New Jersey Nets |
| Chris Smith | 1992 | 2 | 34 | Minnesota Timberwolves |
| Scott Burrell | 1993 | 1 | 20 | Charlotte Hornets |
| Donyell Marshall# | 1994 | 1 | 4 | Minnesota Timberwolves |
| Donny Marshall | 1995 | 2 | 39 | Cleveland Cavaliers |
| Ray Allen# | 1996 | 1 | 5 | Minnesota Timberwolves |
| Travis Knight | 1996 | 1 | 29 | Chicago Bulls |
| Doron Sheffer | 1996 | 2 | 36 | Los Angeles Clippers |
| Richard Hamilton# | 1999 | 1 | 7 | Washington Wizards |
| Jake Voskuhl | 2000 | 2 | 33 | Chicago Bulls |
| Khalid El-Amin | 2000 | 2 | 34 | Chicago Bulls |
| Caron Butler# | 2002 | 1 | 10 | Miami Heat |
| Emeka Okafor# | 2004 | 1 | 2 | Charlotte Bobcats |
| Ben Gordon# | 2004 | 1 | 3 | Chicago Bulls |
| Charlie Villanueva# | 2005 | 1 | 7 | Toronto Raptors |
| Rudy Gay# | 2006 | 1 | 8 | Houston Rockets |
| Hilton Armstrong# | 2006 | 1 | 12 | New Orleans Hornets |
| Marcus Williams | 2006 | 1 | 22 | New Jersey Nets |
| Josh Boone | 2006 | 1 | 23 | New Jersey Nets |
| Denham Brown | 2006 | 2 | 40 | Seattle SuperSonics |
| Hasheem Thabeet# | 2009 | 1 | 2 | Memphis Grizzlies |
| A. J. Price | 2009 | 2 | 52 | Indiana Pacers |
| Stanley Robinson | 2010 | 2 | 59 | Orlando Magic |
| Kemba Walker# | 2011 | 1 | 9 | Charlotte Bobcats |
| Ater Majok | 2011 | 2 | 58 | Los Angeles Lakers |
| Andre Drummond# | 2012 | 1 | 9 | Detroit Pistons |
| Jeremy Lamb# | 2012 | 1 | 12 | Houston Rockets |
| Alex Oriakhi | 2013 | 2 | 57 | Phoenix Suns |
| Shabazz Napier | 2014 | 1 | 24 | Charlotte Hornets |
| DeAndre Daniels | 2014 | 2 | 37 | Toronto Raptors |
| Daniel Hamilton | 2016 | 2 | 56 | Denver Nuggets |
| James Bouknight# | 2021 | 1 | 11 | Charlotte Hornets |
| Tyrese Martin | 2022 | 2 | 51 | Golden State Warriors |
| Jordan Hawkins# | 2023 | 1 | 14 | New Orleans Pelicans |
| Andre Jackson Jr. | 2023 | 2 | 36 | Orlando Magic |
| Stephon Castle# | 2024 | 1 | 4 | San Antonio Spurs |
| Donovan Clingan# | 2024 | 1 | 7 | Portland Trail Blazers |
| Tristen Newton | 2024 | 2 | 49 | Indiana Pacers |
| Cam Spencer | 2024 | 2 | 53 | Detroit Pistons |
| Liam McNeeley | 2025 | 1 | 29 | Phoenix Suns |
| Tarris Reed | 2026 | 1 | 26 | Denver Nuggets |
| Alex Karaban | 2026 | 1 | 29 | Cleveland Cavaliers |

# NBA Lottery Pick

=== NBA careers ===
There are 46 former UConn players who have played in the NBA. The program's first NBA player was Worthy Patterson, who played for the St. Louis Hawks for three months during the 1957–58 NBA season. Ten Huskies were considered active during the 2025–26 season.

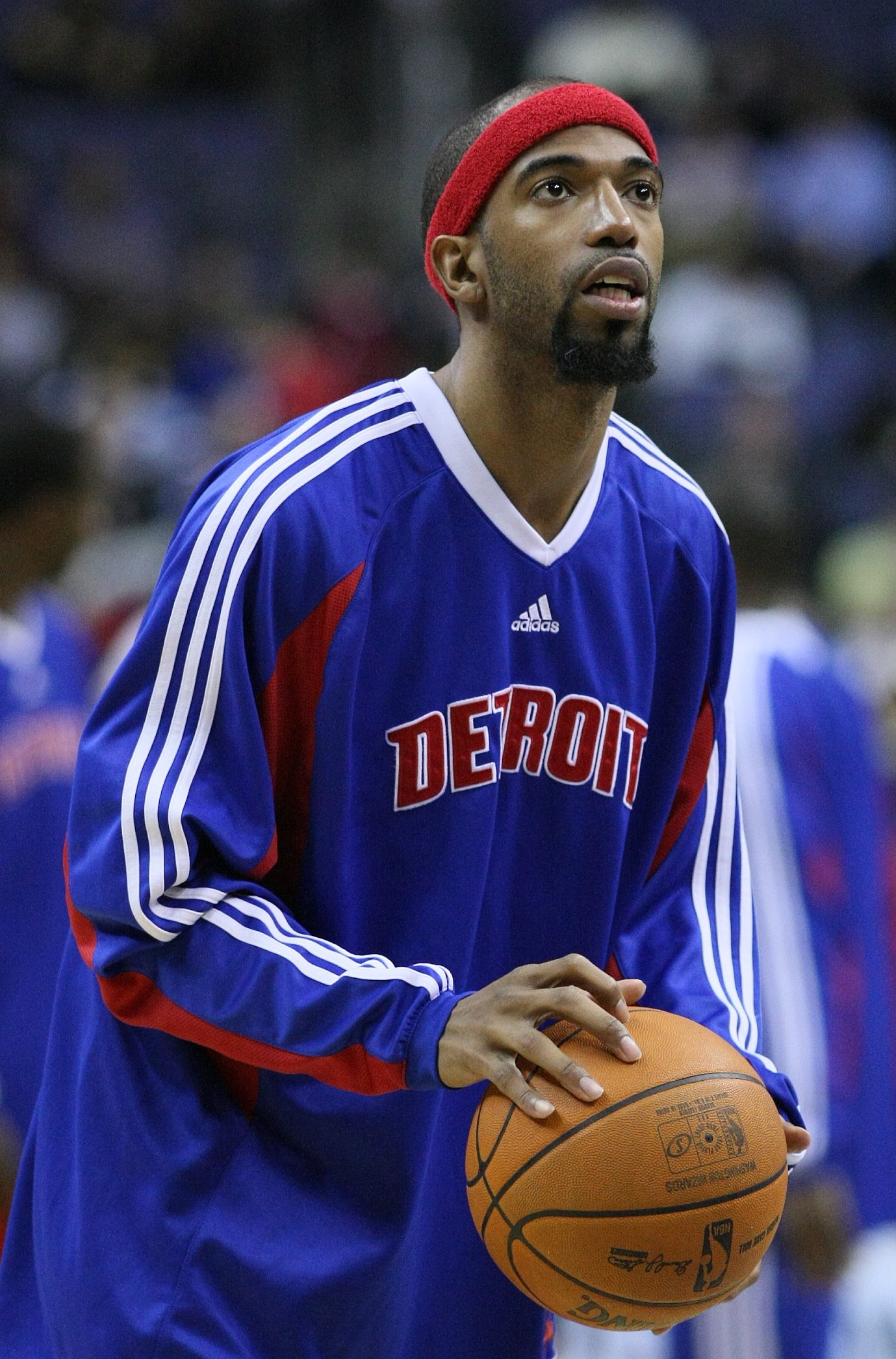
Richard Hamilton, 3-time All-Star

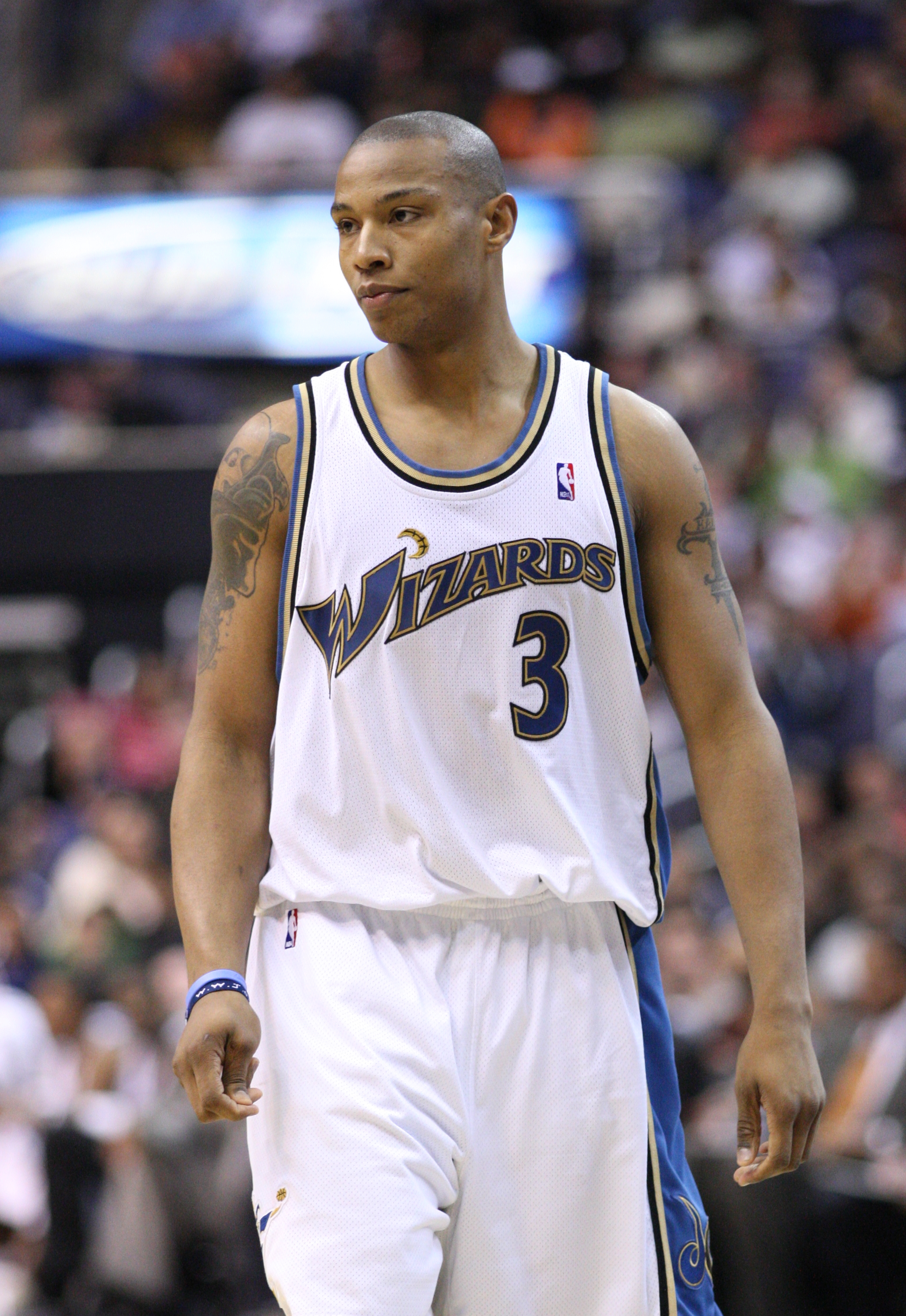
Caron Butler, 2-time All-Star

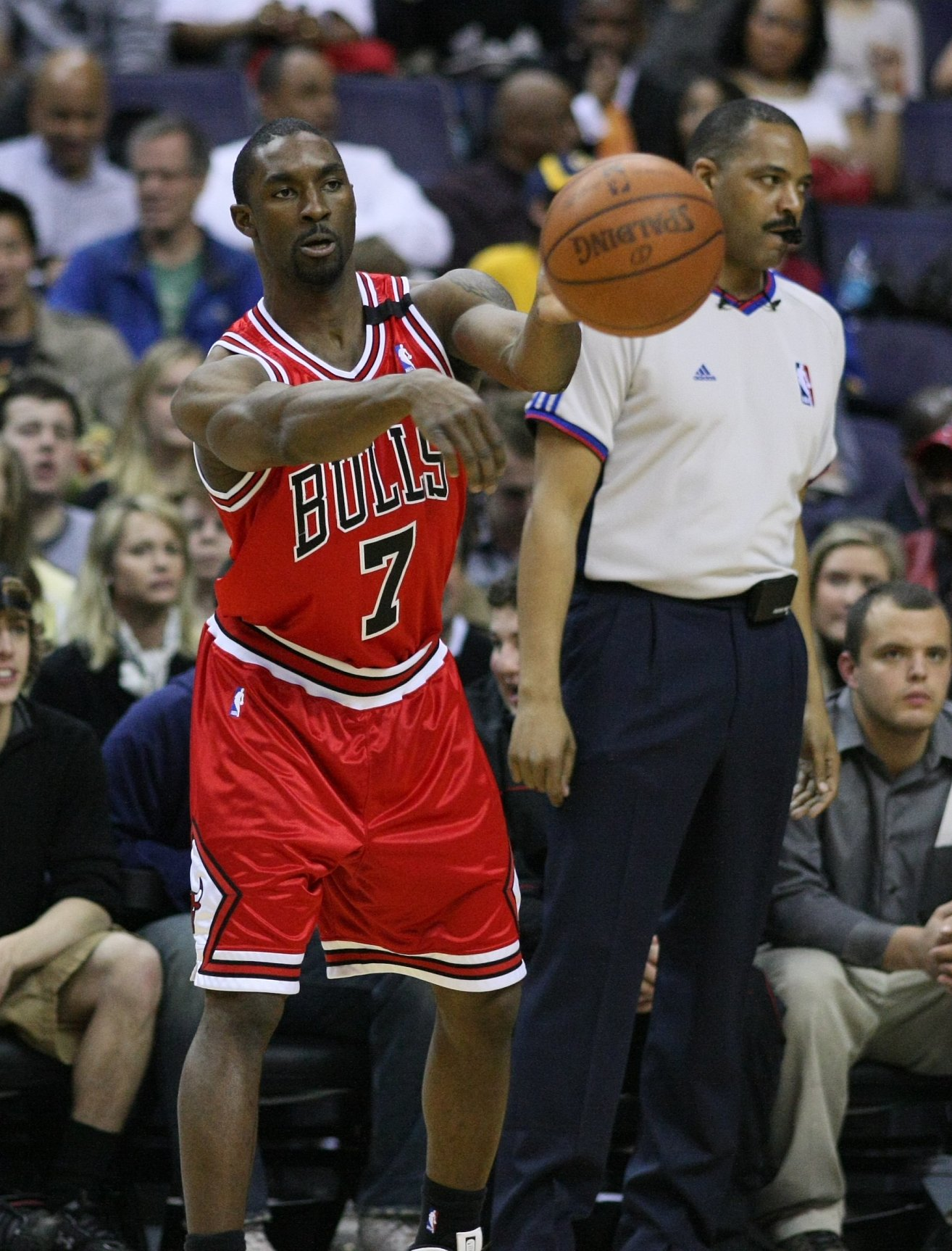
Ben Gordon, NBA Sixth Man of the Year

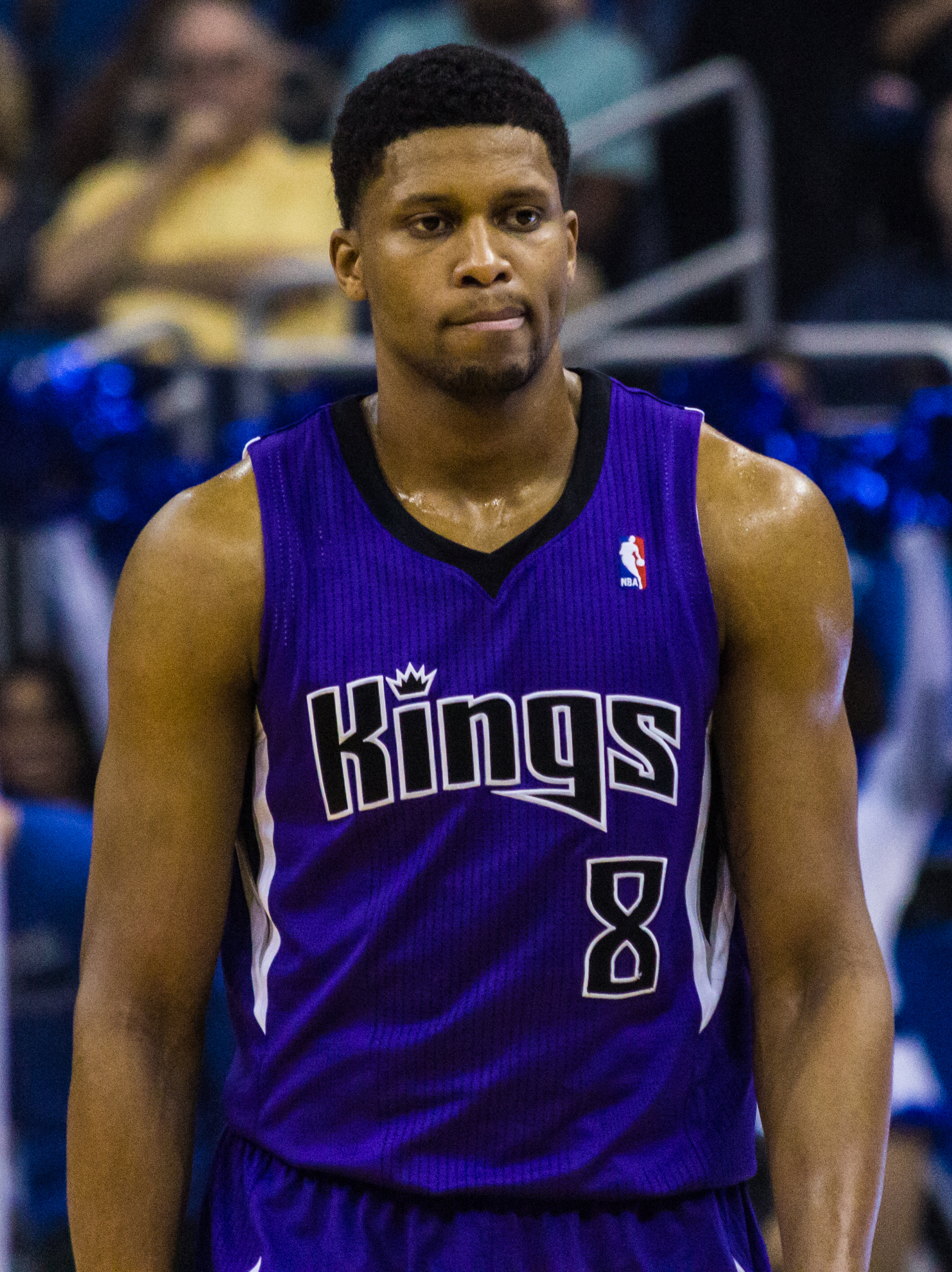
Rudy Gay

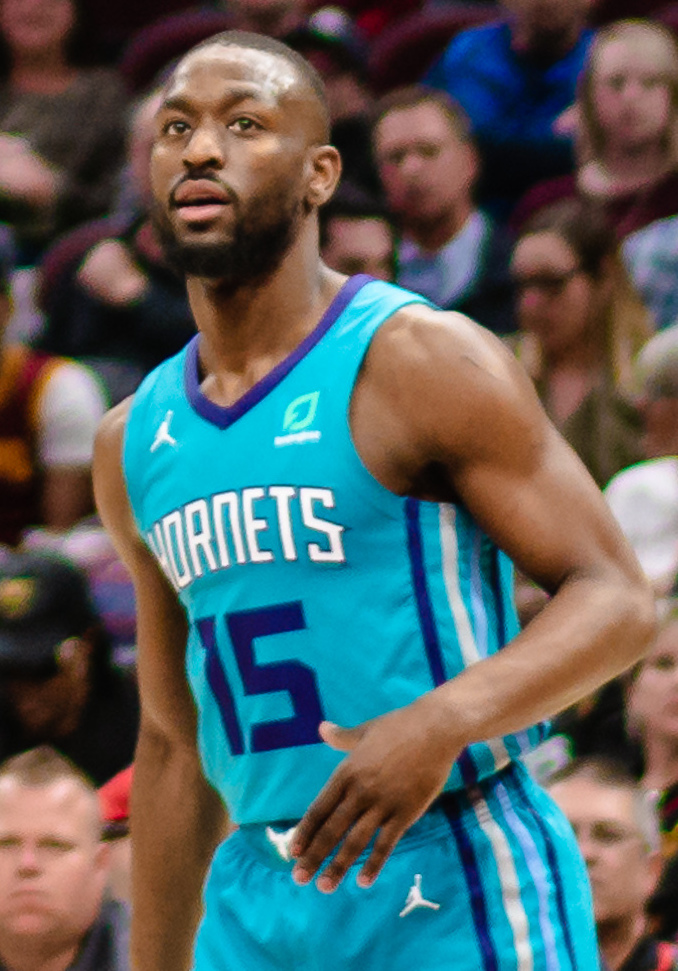
Kemba Walker, 4-time All-Star

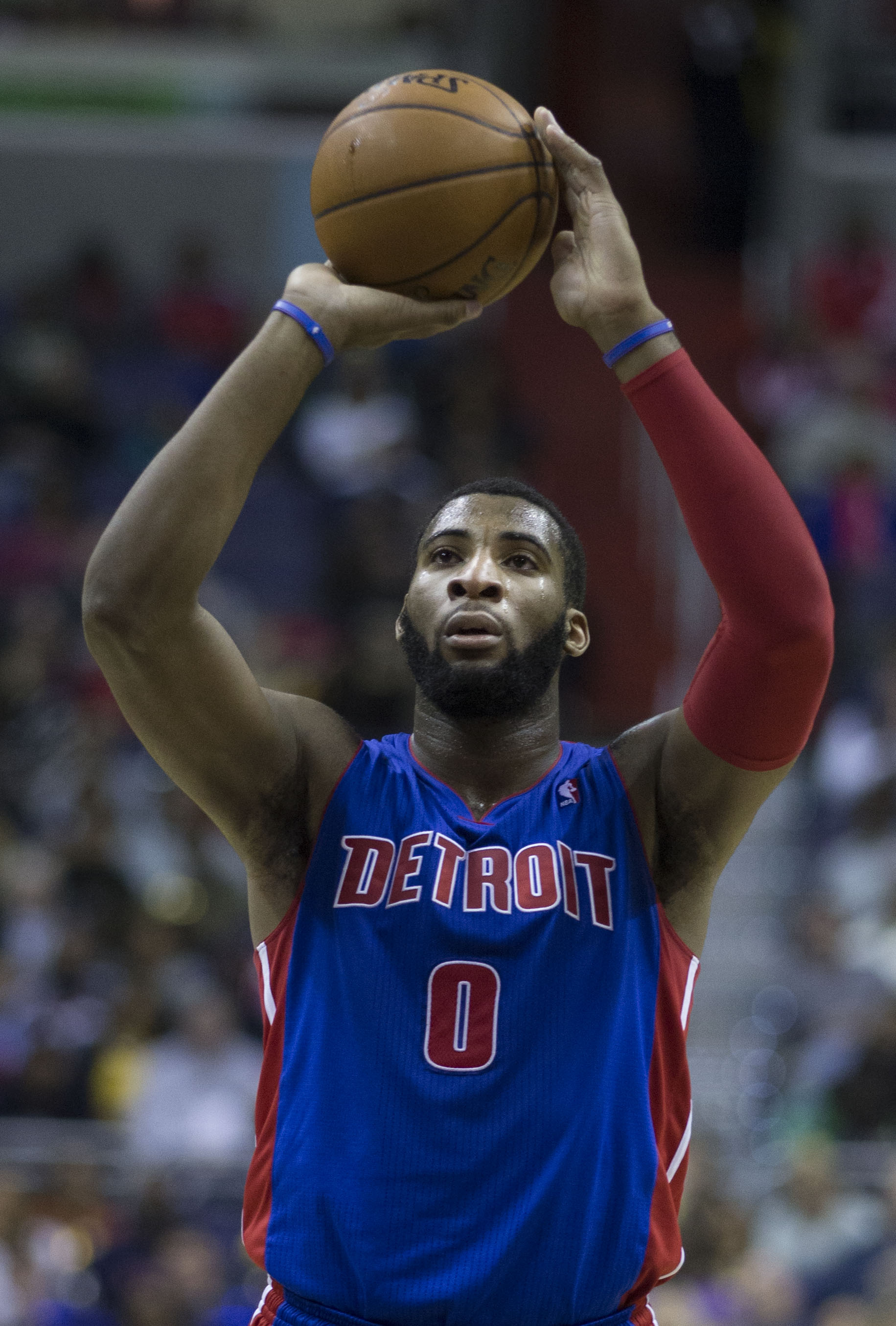
Andre Drummond, 2-time All-Star

UConn Players in the NBA
| Player | Draft year | Seasons | Games played | Highlights and Awards |
|---|---|---|---|---|
| Jeff Adrien | 2010 | 5 | 153 | |
| Chuck Aleksinas | 1982 | 1 | 74 | |
| Ray Allen^ | 1996 | 18 | 1,300 | Naismith Memorial Basketball Hall of Fame, NBA 75th Anniversary Team, 2× NBA champion (2008, 2013), 10× NBA All-Star (2000–2002, 2004–2009, 2011), All-NBA Second Team (2005), All-NBA Third Team (2001), NBA Sportsmanship Award (2003), NBA Three-Point Contest champion (2001), NBA All-Rookie Second Team (1997), 7× NBA Player of the Week (2002, 2003, 2004, 2005) |
| Hilton Armstrong | 2006 | 6 | 292 | |
| Josh Boone | 2006 | 4 | 256 | |
| **James Bouknight** | 2021 | 3 | 79 | |
| Amida Brimah | 2017 | 1 | 5 | |
| Scott Burrell | 1993 | 8 | 383 | NBA champion (1998) |
| Caron Butler+ | 2002 | 14 | 881 | NBA champion (2011), 2× NBA All-Star (2007, 2008), NBA All-Rookie First Team (2003), NBA Rookie Challenge (2003), NBA Player of the Week (2007) |
| **Stephon Castle**~ | 2024 | 2 | 149 | NBA Rookie of the Year (2025), NBA All-Rookie First Team (2025), NBA Rising Stars Challenge (2025) |
| **Donovan Clingan** | 2024 | 2 | 144 | NBA All-Rookie Second Team (2025) |
| **Andre Drummond*** | 2012 | 14 | 967 | 2× NBA All-Star (2016, 2018), All-NBA Third Team (2016), NBA All-Rookie Second Team (2013), 2× NBA Rising Stars Challenge (2013, 2014), NBA Rising Stars Challenge MVP (2014), 4× NBA rebounding leader (2016, 2018–2020), 5× NBA Player of the Week (2016, 2018, 2019) |
| Jerome Dyson | 2010 | 1 | 9 | |
| Khalid El-Amin | 2000 | 3 | 50 | NBA Rookie Challenge (2001) |
| Rudy Gay | 2006 | 17 | 1,120 | NBA All-Rookie First Team (2007), 2× NBA Rookie Challenge (2007, 2008) |
| Tate George | 1990 | 6 | 177 | |
| Ben Gordon | 2004 | 11 | 744 | NBA Sixth Man of the Year (2005), NBA All-Rookie First Team (2005), NBA Rookie Challenge (2006), 4× NBA Player of the Week (2006, 2007, 2009) |
| Daniel Hamilton | 2016 | 2 | 25 | |
| Richard Hamilton+ | 1999 | 14 | 921 | NBA champion (2004), 3× NBA All-Star (2006–2008), NBA Rookie Challenge (2001), 2× NBA Player of the Week (2002, 2006) No. 32 retired by Detroit Pistons |
| **Jordan Hawkins** | 2023 | 3 | 174 | NBA Rising Stars Challenge (2024) |
| **Andre Jackson Jr.** | 2023 | 3 | 172 | |
| Toby Kimball | 1965 | 9 | 571 | |
| Travis Knight | 1996 | 8 | 371 | NBA champion (2000), NBA All-Rookie Second Team (1997), NBA Rookie Challenge (1997) |
| Bruce Kuczenski | 1983 | 2 | 15 | |
| Jeremy Lamb | 2012 | 10 | 573 | |
| Donny Marshall | 1995 | 6 | 119 | |
| Donyell Marshall | 1994 | 15 | 957 | NBA All-Rookie Second Team (1995), NBA Rookie Challenge (1995) |
| **Tyrese Martin** | 2022 | 3 | 122 | |
| **Liam McNeeley** | 2025 | 1 | 31 | |
| Shabazz Napier | 2014 | 6 | 345 | |
| **Tristen Newton** | 2024 | 2 | 9 | |
| Emeka Okafor~ | 2004 | 10 | 616 | NBA Rookie of the Year (2005), NBA All-Rookie First Team (2005), 2× NBA Rookie Challenge (2005, 2006) |
| Kevin Ollie | 1995 | 14 | 662 | |
| Worthy Patterson | 1954 | 1 | 4 | |
| A. J. Price | 2009 | 6 | 261 | |
| Rodney Purvis | 2017 | 1 | 16 | |
| Clifford Robinson+ | 1989 | 18 | 1,380 | NBA All-Star (1994), NBA Sixth Man of the Year (1993), 2× NBA All-Defensive Second Team (2000, 2002), NBA Player of the Week (1996) |
| **Adama Sanogo** | 2023 | 2 | 13 | |
| Chris Smith | 1992 | 4 | 224 | |
| **Cam Spencer** | 2024 | 2 | 97 | |
| Hasheem Thabeet | 2009 | 5 | 224 | |
| Corny Thompson | 1982 | 2 | 44 | |
| Charlie Villanueva | 2005 | 11 | 656 | NBA All-Rookie First Team (2006), NBA Rookie Challenge (2006) |
| Jake Voskuhl | 2000 | 9 | 450 | |
| Kemba Walker* | 2011 | 12 | 750 | 4× NBA All-Star (2017–2020), All-NBA Third Team (2019), NBA Rising Stars Challenge (2012), 8× NBA Player of the Week (2014, 2015, 2016, 2017, 2019, 2022), 2× NBA Sportsmanship Award (2017, 2018) |
| Marcus Williams | 2006 | 4 | 203 | NBA All-Rookie Second Team (2007), NBA Rookie Challenge (2007) |

| ^ | Denotes player who has been inducted to the Naismith Memorial Basketball Hall of Fame |
| * | Denotes player who has been selected for at least one All-Star Game and All-NBA Team |
| ^{+} | Denotes player who has been selected for at least one All-Star Game |
| ^{x} | Denotes player who has been selected for at least one All-NBA Team |
| ^{~} | Denotes player who has been selected as Rookie of the Year |

Bold indicates players considered active in the 2025–26 NBA season. All stats updated through end of 2025–26 season.

=== ABA careers ===
Two former UConn players—Wes Bialosuknia and Jimmy Foster—were drafted in the NBA but elected to play in the American Basketball Association instead. Bialosuknia was selected by the Oakland Oaks in the first round of the inaugural ABA draft in 1967. While he only played one season in the ABA, he finished with the league's second-highest 3-point field goal percentage and the league record for most consecutive 3-point field goals (9). Foster was selected by the Carolina Cougars in the seventh round of the ABA draft in 1974. He spent two seasons in the ABA and played in the ABA All-Star game as a member of the Denver Nuggets in 1976. After the 1975–76 season concluded, the ABA merged with the NBA. Foster then faced a contract dispute with Nuggets and left the team. He briefly played in Europe before retiring from professional basketball.

== Huskies in USA Basketball ==
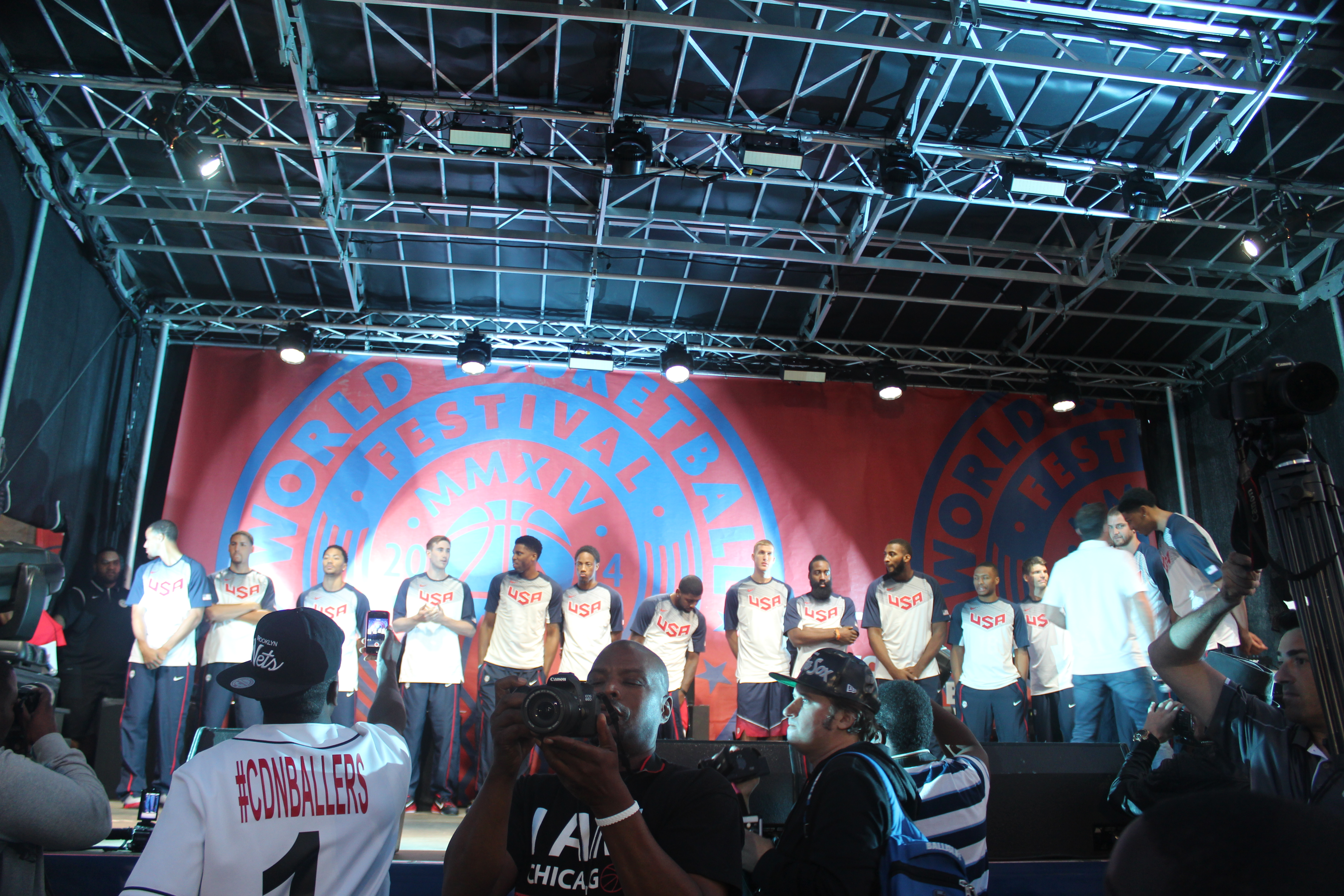
The United States men's national basketball team in 2014, which included former UConn stars Rudy Gay (fifth player from left) and Andre Drummond (tenth player from left)

Since 1980, USA Basketball has selected 23 players and three coaches with UConn ties to represent the United States in international competition. UConn players and coaches have combined to win 18 gold medals at various levels of competition, including at the 2000 Summer Olympic Games and the 2010 and 2014 FIBA Basketball World Cups.

Three Huskies have represented the United States in men's basketball during the Olympic Games:

- Ray Allen, a starter on the gold medal-winning team in 2000
- Emeka Okafor, a reserve on the bronze medal-winning team in 2004
- Dee Rowe, an assistant coach on the team in 1980 when the United States boycotted the Summer Olympics

In addition, four Huskies have represented the United States in the FIBA Basketball World Cup:

- Rudy Gay, a reserve who averaged double-digit minutes on the gold medal-winning teams in 2010 and 2014
- Andre Drummond, a reserve on the gold medal-winning team in 2014
- Chris Smith, a starter on the bronze-medal winning team in 1990
- Kemba Walker, a starter and leading scorer on the seventh-place team in 2019

Gay is one of only three players in USA Basketball history to win two FIBA Basketball World Cups. UConn players have also won gold medals at the FIBA AmeriCup (1999, 2003), the Goodwill Games (1998) and the World University Games (1995, 1999).

=== Players ===
UConn players in USA Basketball
| Player | Appearances |
|---|---|
| Ray Allen | 2003 Tournament of the Americas (Gold), 2000 Summer Olympics (Gold), 1995 World University Games (Gold), 1994 U.S. Olympic Festival (Won) |
| Josh Boone | 2020–21 FIBA AmeriCup Qualifying Team (2-0) |
| Caron Butler | 2001 FIBA Under-21 World Championship (Gold) |
| Stephon Castle | 2022 FIBA Americas Under-18 Championship (Gold) |
| Andre Drummond | 2018–20 United States Men's National Team, 2014 FIBA Basketball World Cup (Gold), 2010 FIBA Under-17 World Championship (Gold), 2009 FIBA Under-16 Americas Championship (Gold) |
| Jerome Dyson | 2011 Pan American Games (Bronze) |
| Khalid El-Amin | 1998 Goodwill Games (Gold) |
| Kevin Freeman | 1999 World University Games (Gold) |
| Rudy Gay | 2014 FIBA Basketball World Cup (Gold), 2010 FIBA World Championship (Gold), 2009–12 United States Men's National Team, 2005 FIBA Under-21 World Championship (5th), 2004 Nike Hoop Summit (Won) |
| Sterling Gibbs | 2010 Summer Youth Olympic Games (4th), 2009 FIBA Under-16 Americas Championship (Gold) |
| Ben Gordon | 2003 Pan American Games (4th) |
| Richard Hamilton | 1999 Tournament of the Americas (Gold) |
| Jeremy Lamb | 2011 FIBA Under-19 World Championship (5th) |
| Donyell Marshall | 1993 Team USA European Tour (3-2), 1991 U.S. Olympic Festival (Silver) |
| Liam McNeeley | 2021 FIBA Under-16 Americas Championship (Gold) |
| Emeka Okafor | 2004 Summer Olympics (Bronze), 2003 Pan American Games (4th) |
| Rodney Purvis | 2017–19 World Cup Qualifying Team (2-0), 2012 FIBA Americas Under-18 Championship (Gold) |
| Stanley Robinson | 2006 FIBA Under-18 AmeriCup (Gold) 2005 USA Basketball Youth Development Festival (Bronze) |
| Chris Smith | 1990 FIBA World Championship (Bronze), 1990 Goodwill Games (Silver) 1989 U.S. Olympic Festival (Silver) |
| Charlie Villanueva | 2004 FIBA Americas Under-20 Championship (Gold) |
| Kemba Walker | 2018–20 United States Men's National Team, 2019 FIBA Basketball World Cup (7th) |
| Toraino Walker | 1990 U.S. Olympic Festival (Bronze) |
| Marcus Williams | 2005 FIBA Under-21 World Championship (5th), 2002 USA Basketball Youth Development Festival (Bronze) |

=== Coaches ===
UConn Coaches in USA Basketball
| Coach | Appearances |
|---|---|
| Jim Calhoun | 1993 COPABA Under-22 Qualifying Tournament – Assistant Coach (Silver), 1986 U.S. Olympic Festival – Assistant Coach (Silver) |
| Kevin Ollie | 2016 FIBA Americas Under-18 Championship – Assistant Coach (Gold) |
| Dee Rowe | 1980 Summer Olympics – Assistant Coach (DNP) |

== Notable victories ==
- December 10, 1921 – UConn upsets Army at West Point, 33–31. Phil Dean hits a game-winning shot with under 30 seconds left to secure the win over an Army squad ranked No. 3 in the nation that season by the Premo-Porretta Power Poll.
- February 27, 1954 – Worthy Patterson's buzzer-beater at No. 7 Holy Cross gives UConn an upset of the then-powerhouse Crusaders, 78–77.
- March 13, 1956 – UConn defeats Manhattan 84–75 to win an NCAA Division I men's basketball tournament game for the first time.
- March 14, 1964 – UConn upsets Princeton and star forward Bill Bradley 52–50 in the Sweet Sixteen. The victory is sealed when Dom Perno steals the ball from Bradley with 19 seconds to play. Perno would later become UConn's coach.
- February 28, 1970 ("The Slowdown Game") – With four players unavailable and a share of the Yankee Conference Regular-Season Championship on the line, UConn beats Rhode Island 35–32 at the Field House. Played before the shot clock-era, UConn dribbles endlessly for 38 minutes to make up for their limited roster.
- March 30, 1988 – UConn defeats Ohio State 72–67 at Madison Square Garden to win the 1988 National Invitation Tournament.
- January 27, 1990 – UConn beats No. 15 St. John's 72–58 in the first game played at Gampel Pavilion.
- March 11, 1990 – UConn beats Syracuse 78–75 at Madison Square Garden to win its first Big East men's tournament championship.
- March 22, 1990 ("The Shot") – Tate George makes a shot at the buzzer to beat Clemson 71–70 in the 1990 Sweet Sixteen at Brendan Byrne Arena in East Rutherford, New Jersey.
- March 9, 1996 – With 4 minutes remaining, UConn trails Georgetown 74–63. The Huskies close the game with a 12–0 run and win the Big East Championship 75–74 on an off-balance floater from All-American Ray Allen at Madison Square Garden.
- March 20, 1998 (Hamilton "Rips" Washington's heart out) – Down 74–73 in the Sweet Sixteen to the eleven seed Washington Huskies, two seed UConn gets three shot attempts off in the final 15 seconds with Rip Hamilton's buzzer beating jumper winning it 75–74.
- March 20, 1999 – UConn defeats Gonzaga 67–62 to win the West Regional Final and advance to the Final Four for the first time.
- March 29, 1999 – UConn wins its first NCAA Championship, defeating Duke 77–74 at Tropicana Field in St. Petersburg, Florida.
- March 27, 2004 – UConn defeats Alabama 87–71 to win the West Regional Final and advance to the Final Four for the second time.
- April 5, 2004 – UConn wins its second NCAA Championship, defeating Georgia Tech 82–73 at the Alamodome in San Antonio.
- March 28, 2009 – UConn defeats Missouri 82–75 to win the Arizona Regional Final and advance to the Final Four for the third time.
- March 12, 2011 ("Five Games in Five Days") – In the final of the Big East tournament, UConn defeats Louisville by a score of 69–66 to claim their seventh Big East Championship. The victory capped an unprecedented run wherein the Huskies won five tournament games in five consecutive days. Four of those wins came against top-25 opponents. Junior All-American guard Kemba Walker scored a tournament-record 130 points in the five-game run, and was named tournament MVP.
- March 26, 2011 – UConn defeats Arizona 65–63 to win the West Regional Final and advance to the Final Four for the fourth time.
- April 4, 2011 – UConn wins its third NCAA Championship, defeating Butler 53–41 at Reliant Stadium in Houston, Texas.
- November 9, 2012 – In Kevin Ollie's first game as Connecticut head coach, UConn beats the No. 14 Michigan State Spartans 66–62 at Ramstein Air Base in Germany.
- March 30, 2014 – UConn defeats Michigan State 60–54 at Madison Square Garden to win the East Regional Final and advance to the Final Four for the fifth time.
- April 7, 2014 – UConn wins its fourth NCAA Championship, defeating Kentucky 60–54 at AT&T Stadium in Arlington, Texas.
- March 11, 2016 – With 0.8 seconds remaining and UConn down by 3, freshman point guard Jalen Adams hits a 70-foot 3 pointer to tie an American Athletic Conference men's basketball tournament quarterfinal game against Cincinnati and force a fourth overtime. UConn wins the game 104–97, and the final against Memphis two days later to advance to the 2016 NCAA Division I men's basketball tournament.
- March 25, 2023 – UConn defeats Gonzaga 82–54 to win the West Regional Final and advance to the Final Four for the sixth time.
- April 3, 2023 – UConn wins its fifth NCAA Championship, defeating San Diego State 76–59 at NRG Stadium in Houston, Texas.
- November 27, 2023 – UConn defeats New Hampshire 84–64 to set an NCAA record with its 24th straight non-conference victory by double digits.
- March 30, 2024 – In a game that notably included a 30–0 run, UConn defeats Illinois 77–52 to win the East Regional Final and advance to their seventh Final Four.
- April 8, 2024 – UConn wins back-to-back titles with its sixth NCAA Championship, defeating Purdue 75–60 at State Farm Stadium in Glendale, Arizona.
- March 29, 2026 – With 0.4 seconds left in regulation, Braylon Mullins hits a deep three pointer to defeat Duke 73–72, completing a 19 point comeback and securing a third Final Four in four years by winning the East Regional Final.

== Awards ==
=== Conference awards ===
AAC Defensive Player of the Year
- Amida Brimah – 2015

AAC Most Improved Player

- Josh Carlton – 2019

AAC Player of the Year

- Shabazz Napier – 2014

AAC Rookie of the Year

- Daniel Hamilton – 2015

AAC Tournament MVP

- Daniel Hamilton – 2016

All-AAC First Team

- Shabazz Napier – 2014
- Ryan Boatright – 2015
- Jalen Adams – 2017

All-AAC Second Team

- Daniel Hamilton – 2016
- Jalen Adams – 2018

All-AAC Third Team

- Jalen Adams – 2019
- James Bouknight – 2020

All-Big East Conference First Team

- Corny Thompson – 1982
- Chris Smith – 1992
- Donyell Marshall – 1993, 1994
- Ray Allen – 1995, 1996
- Richard Hamilton – 1998, 1999
- Khalid El-Amin – 2000
- Caron Butler – 2002
- Emeka Okafor – 2003, 2004
- Ben Gordon – 2004
- Rudy Gay – 2006
- Jeff Adrien – 2008
- A.J. Price – 2008
- Hasheem Thabeet – 2009
- Kemba Walker – 2011
- Jeremy Lamb – 2012
- Shabazz Napier – 2013
- James Bouknight – 2021
- R. J. Cole – 2022
- Adama Sanogo – 2022, 2023
- Jordan Hawkins – 2023
- Tristen Newton – 2024
- Cam Spencer – 2024
- Alex Karaban – 2026
- Silas Demary Jr. – 2026
- Tarris Reed Jr. – 2026

All-Big East Conference Second Team

- Corny Thompson – 1980
- Chuck Aleksinas – 1981
- Mike McKay – 1982
- Earl Kelley – 1985, 1986
- Clifford Robinson – 1989
- Chris Smith – 1990, 1991
- Scott Burrell – 1992
- Doron Sheffer – 1995, 1996
- Khalid El-Amin – 1999
- Ben Gordon – 2003
- Josh Boone – 2005
- Charlie Villanueva – 2005
- Hilton Armstrong – 2006
- Marcus Williams – 2006
- Jeff Adrien – 2007
- Hasheem Thabeet – 2008
- A.J. Price – 2009
- Alex Karaban – 2025
- Solo Ball – 2025, 2026

All-Big East Conference Third Team

- Mike McKay – 1980, 1981
- Karl Hobbs – 1984
- Clifford Robinson – 1988
- Tate George – 1990
- Nadav Henefeld – 1990
- Scott Burrell – 1991, 1993
- Rod Sellers – 1992
- Donny Marshall – 1994, 1995
- Doron Sheffer – 1994
- Kevin Ollie – 1995
- Khalid El-Amin – 1999
- Caron Butler – 2001
- Emeka Okafor – 2002
- Marcus Williams – 2005
- Jeff Adrien – 2009
- Jerome Dyson – 2010
- Kemba Walker – 2010
- Liam McNeeley – 2025

All-ECAC

- Toby Kimball – 1964

All-New England First Team

- Walt Dropo – 1946, 1947
- Vincent Yokabaskas – 1950, 1951, 1952
- Art Quimby – 1954, 1955
- Toby Kimball – 1963, 1964, 1965
- Wes Bialosuknia – 1965, 1966, 1967
- Bill Corley – 1966, 1967, 1968
- Tony Hanson – 1975, 1976, 1977

All-Yankee Conference First Team

- Stan Sorota – 1949
- Henry Bartnicki – 1950
- Vincent Yokabaskas – 1950, 1951, 1952
- Burr Carlson – 1952
- Art Quimby – 1953, 1954, 1955
- Worthy Patterson – 1953, 1954
- Toby Kimball – 1963, 1964, 1965
- Wes Bialosuknia – 1965, 1966, 1967
- Bill Corley – 1966, 1967, 1968
- Tony Hanson – 1975, 1976

Big East All-Freshman Team

- Bruce Kuczenski – 1980
- Vernon Giscombe – 1981
- Earl Kelley – 1983
- Phil Gamble – 1986
- Tate George – 1987
- Scott Burrell – 1990
- Nadav Henefeld – 1990
- Donyell Marshall – 1992
- Ray Allen – 1994
- Doron Sheffer – 1994
- Richard Hamilton – 1997
- Khalid El-Amin – 1998
- Caron Butler – 2001
- Emeka Okafor – 2002
- Ben Gordon – 2002
- Josh Boone – 2004
- Charlie Villanueva – 2004
- Rudy Gay – 2005
- Jeff Adrien – 2006
- Jerome Dyson – 2007
- Hasheem Thabeet – 2007
- Kemba Walker – 2009
- Alex Oriakhi – 2010
- Shabazz Napier – 2011
- Jeremy Lamb – 2011
- Andre Drummond – 2012
- Omar Calhoun – 2013
- Adama Sanogo – 2021
- Jordan Hawkins – 2022
- Donovan Clingan – 2023
- Alex Karaban – 2023
- Stephon Castle – 2024
- Liam McNeeley – 2025
- Braylon Mullins – 2026

Big East All-Defensive Team

- Silas Demary Jr. – 2026

Big East Coach of the Year

- Jim Calhoun – 1990, 1994, 1996, 1998
- Dan Hurley – 2024

Big East Defensive Player of the Year

- Donyell Marshall – 1994
- Emeka Okafor – 2003, 2004
- Josh Boone – 2005
- Hilton Armstrong – 2006
- Hasheem Thabeet – 2008, 2009
- Isaiah Whaley – 2021

Big East Most Improved Player

- Marcus Williams – 2005

Big East Player of the Year

- Donyell Marshall – 1994
- Ray Allen – 1996
- Richard Hamilton – 1998, 1999
- Caron Butler – 2002
- Emeka Okafor – 2004
- Hasheem Thabeet – 2009

Big East Rookie of the Year

- Earl Kelley – 1983
- Nadav Henefeld – 1990
- Doron Sheffer – 1994
- Khalid El-Amin – 1998
- Rudy Gay – 2005
- Stephon Castle – 2024
- Liam McNeeley – 2025

Big East Sixth Man of the Year

- Tyler Polley – 2021
- Hassan Diarra – 2024
- Tarris Reed Jr. – 2025

Big East Tournament MVP

- Chris Smith – 1990
- Khalid El-Amin – 1998
- Kevin Freeman – 1999
- Caron Butler – 2002
- Ben Gordon – 2004
- Kemba Walker – 2011
- Tristen Newton – 2024

ECAC Player of the Year

- Tony Hanson – 1977

New England Player of the Year

- Tony Hanson – 1977

Yankee Conference Rookie of the Year

- Tony Hanson – 1974

=== National awards ===
Academic All-America Team Member of the Year

- Emeka Okafor – 2004

AP All-American Honorable Mentions

- Art Quimby – 1955
- Toby Kimball – 1965
- Wes Bialosuknia – 1967
- Tony Hanson – 1975, 1977
- Corny Thompson – 1980, 1982, 1983
- Earl Kelley – 1983, 1986
- Nadav Henefeld – 1990
- Chris Smith – 1990, 1991, 1992
- Donny Marshall – 1995
- Khalid El-Amin – 1998, 1999, 2000
- Caron Butler – 2002
- Emeka Okafor – 2003
- Ben Gordon – 2004
- Josh Boone – 2005
- Marcus Williams – 2006
- A. J. Price – 2008, 2009
- Jeff Adrien – 2009
- Jeremy Lamb – 2012
- James Bouknight – 2021
- Adama Sanogo – 2023
- Donovan Clingan – 2024
- Cam Spencer – 2024

AP National Coach of the Year

- Jim Calhoun – 1990

Ben Jobe Award

- Kevin Ollie – 2013

Bob Cousy Award

- Kemba Walker – 2011
- Shabazz Napier – 2014
- Tristen Newton – 2024

Chip Hilton Player of the Year Award

- Emeka Okafor – 2004

Consensus First Team All-Americans

- Donyell Marshall – 1994
- Ray Allen – 1996
- Richard Hamilton – 1999
- Emeka Okafor – 2004
- Kemba Walker – 2011
- Shabazz Napier – 2014
- Tristen Newton – 2024

Consensus Second Team All-Americans

- Richard Hamilton – 1998
- Rudy Gay – 2006
- Hasheem Thabeet – 2009

John R. Wooden Legends of Coaching Award

- Jim Calhoun – 2005

Lute Olson Award

- Kemba Walker – 2011

Naismith College Coach of the Year

- Dan Hurley – 2024

NABC National Defensive Player of the Year

- Emeka Okafor – 2003, 2004
- Hasheem Thabeet – 2008, 2009

NABC National Player of the Year

- Emeka Okafor – 2004

NCAA All-Tournament Team

- Ricky Moore – 1999
- Khalid El-Amin – 1999
- Richard Hamilton – 1999
- Ben Gordon – 2004
- Rashad Anderson – 2004
- Emeka Okafor – 2004
- Jeremy Lamb – 2011
- Kemba Walker – 2011
- DeAndre Daniels – 2014
- Ryan Boatright – 2014
- Shabazz Napier – 2014
- Jordan Hawkins – 2023
- Adama Sanogo – 2023
- Tristen Newton – 2023, 2024
- Stephon Castle – 2024
- Donovan Clingan – 2024
- Cam Spencer – 2024
- Alex Karaban – 2026
- Tarris Reed Jr. – 2026

NCAA Tournament MOP

- Richard Hamilton – 1999
- Emeka Okafor – 2004
- Kemba Walker – 2011
- Shabazz Napier – 2014
- Adama Sanogo – 2023
- Tristen Newton – 2024

NCAA Tournament Regional MOP

- Richard Hamilton – 1999
- Ben Gordon – 2004
- A.J. Price – 2009
- Kemba Walker – 2011
- Shabazz Napier – 2014
- Jordan Hawkins – 2023
- Donovan Clingan – 2024
- Tarris Reed Jr. – 2026

Pete Newell Big Man Award

- Emeka Okafor – 2004

Sporting News Coach of the Year

- Jim Calhoun – 1990
- Dan Hurley – 2024

UPI College Basketball Player of the Year

- Ray Allen – 1996

== Records ==
=== Conference records ===
==== Big East Conference ====
- Regular season championships: 11
- Regular season conference wins: 18
- Tournament championships: 8

==== Yankee Conference ====
- Regular season championships: 18

=== NCAA records ===
- Best point differential in single year, men's tournament history: +140 – UConn, 2024
- Consecutive double digit wins vs. non-conference opponents: 24 – UConn, 2022–2024
- Games in a season (since 1948): 41 – UConn, 2011 (32–9)
- Highest average margin of victory in tournament, championship winner: 23.3 – UConn, 2024
- Lead before opponent scores to start a game (Division I): 32–0 – UConn vs. New Hampshire, Dec. 12, 1990
- Most consecutive wins, Sweet Sixteen or later: 19 – UConn, 2011–2026
- Number of different players to score a three-point field goal in a single game, one team: 10 – UConn vs. Xavier, Jan. 28, 2024
- Rebounds per game (season): 70.0 – UConn, 1955 (1,751 rebounds in 25 games)
