= List of UConn Huskies men's basketball head coaches =

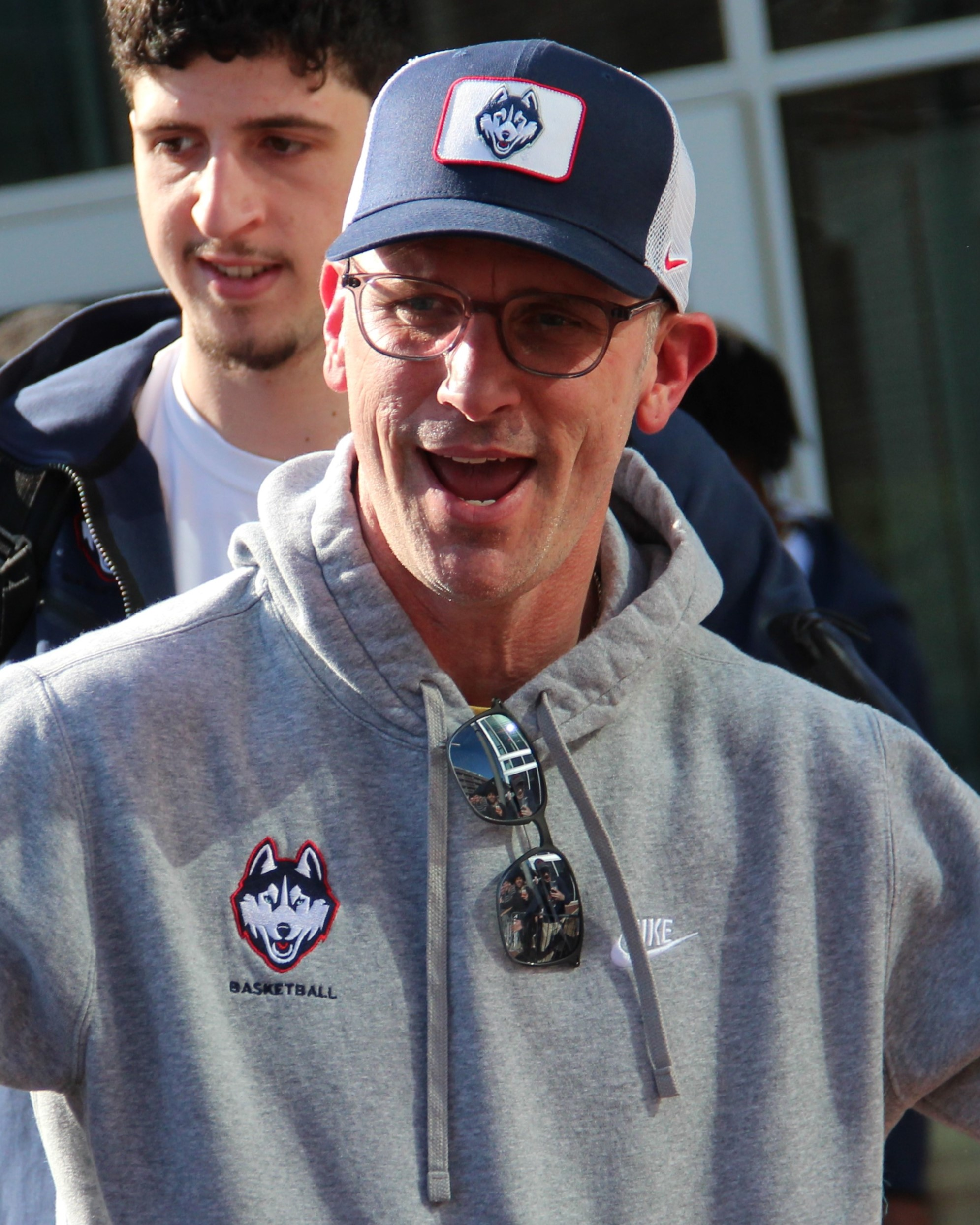
Dan Hurley, the current head coach of the UConn Huskies.

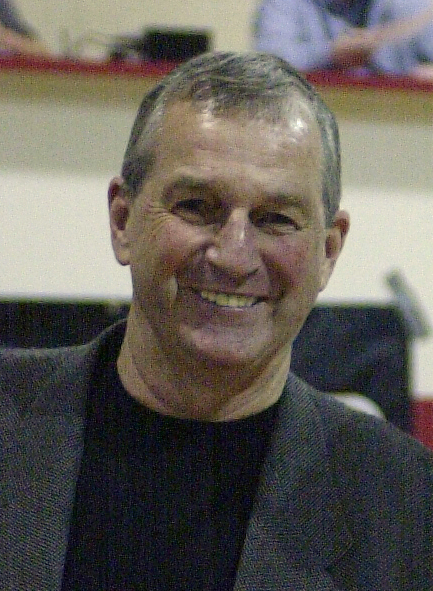
Jim Calhoun, the winningest head coach in Huskies men's basketball history.

The following is a list of UConn Huskies men's basketball head coaches. There have been 19 head coaches of the Huskies in their 121-season history.

UConn's current head coach is Dan Hurley. He was hired as the Huskies' head coach in 2018, replacing Kevin Ollie.

No.	Tenure	Coach	Years	Record	Pct.
—	1900–1908 (Note: Connecticut did not field a team during the 1908–09 and 1909–10 seasons.); 1910–1913 (Note: Connecticut did not field a team during the 1913–14 season.); 1914–1915	No Coach	12	42–43	.494
1	1915–1919	John F. Donahue	4	11–23	.324
2	1919–1921	Ross Swartz	2	14–14	.500
3	1921–1923 (Note: J. Wilder Tasker resigned in January 1923 after the first game of the 1922–23 season.)	J. Wilder Tasker	1 (plus 1 game)	15–15	.500
4	1923–1923 (Note: Roy J. Guyer became head coach in January 1923 after J. Wilder Tasker resigned in January 1923 after the first game of the 1922–23 season.)	Roy J. Guyer	1	8–6	.571
5	1923–1927 (Note: Sumner Dole coached first part of the 1930–31 season while Louis Alexander was on sabbatical.); 1930–1931	Sumner Dole	4 1/2	39–25	.609
6	1927–1931 (Note: Louis Alexander missed part of the 1930–31 season while on sabbatical.)	Louis Alexander	3 1/2	35–19	.648
7	1931–1935 (Note: John J. Heldman Jr., left the head coaching position after the first game of the 1935–36 season.)	John Heldman Jr.	4 (plus 1 game)	19–42	.311
8	1935–1936 (Note: After John J. Heldman Jr., left the head coaching position after the first game of the 1935–36 season, J. O. Christian coached the team for the rest of the season.)	J. O. Christian	1	3–10	.231
9	1936–1945	Don White	9	94–59	.614
10	1945–1947 (Note: Blair Gullion resigned halfway through the 1946–47 season.)	Blair Gullion	1 1/2	15–8	.652
11	1947–1963 (Note: Hugh Greer became head coach after Blair Gullion resigned halfway through the 1946–47 season. Greer died in January 1963, halfway through the 1962–63 season. Greer's 16-season total includes 15 full seasons between 1947 and 1962 and two half-seasons, in 1946–47 and 1962–63.)	Hugh Greer	16	285–112	.718
12	1963–1963 (Note: An assistant coach when Hugh Greer died halfway through the 1962–63 season in January 1963, George Wigton coached the Huskies for the rest of the season.)	George Wigton	1/2	11–4	.733
13	1963–1967	Fred Shabel	4	72–29	.713
14	1967–1969	Burr Carlson	2	16–32	.333
15	1969–1977	Dee Rowe	8	120–88	.577
16	1977–1986	Dom Perno	9	139–91	.604
17	1986–2012	Jim Calhoun	26	629–245	.720
18	2012–2018 (Note: All of UConn's wins during the 2017–18 season were vacated due to recruiting violations. Ollie's career won-lost record at UConn includes the official 0–18 record for that season.)	Kevin Ollie	6	113–79	.589
19	2018–present	Dan Hurley	7	165–69	.705
Totals		19 coaches	121 seasons	1,805–980	.648
Records updated through end of 2023–24 season
