= 1961–62 Connecticut Huskies men's basketball team =

American college basketball season

1961–62 Connecticut Huskies men's basketball
- Conference: Yankee Conference
- Record: 16–8 (7–3 YC)
- Head coach: Hugh Greer (16th season)
- Assistant coaches: Nick Rodis; George Wigton
- Home arena: Hugh S. Greer Field House

1961–62 Yankee Conference men's basketball standings
	Conf.				Overall
Team	W		L	PCT	W		L	PCT
Massachusetts	8	–	2	.800	15	–	9	.625
Connecticut	7	–	3	.700	16	–	8	.667
Rhode Island	7	–	3	.700	14	–	12	.538
Maine	4	–	6	.400	11	–	13	.458
Vermont	3	–	7	.300	12	–	12	.500
New Hampshire	1	–	9	.100	3	–	20	.130

The 1961–62 Connecticut Huskies men's basketball team represented the University of Connecticut in the 1961–62 collegiate men's basketball season. The Huskies completed the season with a 16–8 overall record. The Huskies were members of the Yankee Conference, where they ended the season with a 7–3 record. The Huskies played their home games at Hugh S. Greer Field House in Storrs, Connecticut, and were led by sixteenth-year head coach Hugh Greer.

== Schedule ==
Date time, TV	Rank^{#}	Opponent^{#}	Result	Record	Site (attendance) city, state
Regular Season
12/2/1961*		Yale	W 82–64	1–0	Hugh S. Greer Field House; Storrs, CT
12/6/1961*		at Harvard	W 79–68	2–0	Malkin Athletic Center; Cambridge, MA
12/9/1961*		Boston College	W 78–71	3–0	Hugh S. Greer Field House; Storrs, CT
12/12/1961		at Massachusetts	W 76–65	4–0 (1–0)	Curry Hicks Cage; Amherst, MA
12/16/1961*		at Fordham	L 68–85	4–1	Rose Hill Gymnasium; New York, NY
12/18/1961*		Brown	W 67–61	5–1	Hugh S. Greer Field House; Storrs, CT
1/1/1962		Maine	L 68–73	5–2 (1–1)	Hugh S. Greer Field House; Storrs, CT
1/6/1962*		Holy Cross	L 70–79	5–3	Hugh S. Greer Field House; Storrs, CT
1/9/1962		at Rhode Island	L 63–70	5–4 (1–2)	Keaney Gymnasium; Kingston, RI
1/11/1962		New Hampshire	W 104–56	6–4 (2–2)	Hugh S. Greer Field House; Storrs, CT
1/13/1962*		Manhattan	W 69–68	7–4	Hugh S. Greer Field House; Storrs, CT
1/27/1962		at Vermont	W 67–63	8–4 (3–2)	Burlington, VT
1/29/1962*		Loyola (New Orleans)	W 84–74	9–4	Hugh S. Greer Field House; Storrs, CT
2/3/1962*		at Boston University	W 82–63	10–4	Boston, MA
2/6/1962*		American International	W 78–51	11–4	Hugh S. Greer Field House; Storrs, CT
2/10/1962		Vermont	W 91–57	12–4 (4–2)	Hugh S. Greer Field House; Storrs, CT
2/13/1962		Massachusetts	W 72–56	13–4 (5–2)	Hugh S. Greer Field House; Storrs, CT
2/17/1962*		at Holy Cross	L 64–103	13–5	Worcester, MA
2/20/1962		at Maine	L 68–70	13–6 (5–3)	Memorial Gymnasium; Orono, ME
2/23/1962*		at Rutgers	L 62–93	13–7	College Avenue Gymnasium; Newark, NJ
2/27/1962		New Hampshire	W 85–72	14–7 (6–3)	Hugh S. Greer Field House; Storrs, CT
3/3/1962		Rhode Island	W 89–83	15–7 (7–3)	Hugh S. Greer Field House; Storrs, CT
3/5/1962*		Syracuse; Rivalry	L 67–72	15–8	Hugh S. Greer Field House; Storrs, CT
3/9/1962*		Colgate	W 94–78	16–8	Hugh S. Greer Field House; Storrs, CT
*Non-conference game. ^{#}Rankings from AP Poll. (#) Tournament seedings in parentheses. All times are in Eastern Time.

Schedule Source:
