= 1963–64 Connecticut Huskies men's basketball team =

American college basketball season

1963–64 Connecticut Huskies men's basketball

Yankee Conference Regular Season Co-Champions

NCAA University Division Tournament, Elite Eight
- Conference: Yankee Conference
- Record: 16–11 (9–2 YC)
- Head coach: Fred Shabel (1st season)
- Assistant coach: George Wigton
- Home arena: Hugh S. Greer Field House

1963–64 Yankee Conference men's basketball standings
	Conf.				Overall
Team	W		L	PCT	W		L	PCT
Rhode Island	8	–	2	.800	19	–	8	.704
Connecticut	8	–	2	.800	16	–	11	.593
Massachusetts	5	–	5	.500	15	–	9	.625
Vermont	4	–	6	.400	11	–	10	.524
Maine	3	–	7	.300	12	–	11	.522
New Hampshire	2	–	8	.200	8	–	15	.348

The 1963–64 Connecticut Huskies men's basketball team represented the University of Connecticut in the 1963–64 collegiate men's basketball season. The Huskies completed the season with a 16–11 overall record. The Huskies were members of the Yankee Conference, where they ended the season with a 9–2 record. They were the Yankee Conference Regular Season co-champions and made it to the Elite Eight in the 1964 NCAA Division I men's basketball tournament. The Huskies played their home games at Hugh S. Greer Field House in Storrs, Connecticut, and were led by first-year head coach Fred Shabel.

== Schedule ==
Date time, TV	Rank^{#}	Opponent^{#}	Result	Record	Site (attendance) city, state
Regular Season
12/4/1963*		American International	W 95–49	1–0	Hugh S. Greer Field House; Storrs, CT
12/7/1963*		Yale	L 60–64	1–1	Hugh S. Greer Field House; Storrs, CT
12/10/1963		at Massachusetts	L 59–60	1–2 (0–1)	Curry Hicks Cage; Amherst, MA
12/14/1963*		Boston College	W 108–81	2–2	Hugh S. Greer Field House; Storrs, CT
12/18/1963*		at Fordham	W 59–51	3–2	Rose Hill Gymnasium; New York, NY
12/21/1963*		at Canisius	L 66–84	3–3	Buffalo, NY
1/4/1964*		Manhattan	W 73–57	4–3	Hugh S. Greer Field House; Storrs, CT
1/9/1964*		at Boston University	L 53–55	4–4	Boston, MA
1/11/1964		New Hampshire	W 73–60	5–4 (1–1)	Hugh S. Greer Field House; Storrs, CT
1/13/1964		Maine	W 71–58	6–4 (2–1)	Hugh S. Greer Field House; Storrs, CT
1/18/1964		Rhode Island	W 43–41	7–4 (3–1)	Hugh S. Greer Field House; Storrs, CT
1/29/1964*		at Temple	L 45–53	7–5	Philadelphia, PA
2/2/1964		at Vermont	W 79–46	8–5 (4–1)	Patrick Gym; Burlington, VT
2/5/1964*		at Rutgers	L 67–68	8–6	College Avenue Gymnasium; Newark, NJ
2/8/1964		at Maine	W 80–53	9–6 (5–1)	Memorial Gymnasium; Orono, ME
2/11/1964		Massachusetts	W 72–50	10–6 (6–1)	Hugh S. Greer Field House; Storrs, CT
2/14/1964		Vermont	W 90–64	11–6 (7–1)	Hugh S. Greer Field House; Storrs, CT
2/15/1964*		Holy Cross	L 57–62	11–7	Hugh S. Greer Field House; Storrs, CT
2/19/1964*		at Holy Cross	L 56–60	11–8	Worcester, MA
2/22/1964*		Colgate	W 100–62	12–8	Hugh S. Greer Field House; Storrs, CT
2/25/1964		at New Hampshire	W 58–55	13–8 (8–1)	Lundholm Gym; Durham, NH
2/29/1964		at Rhode Island	L 53–54	13–9 (8–2)	Keaney Gymnasium; Kingston, RI
3/4/1964		at Rhode Island; Yankee Conference Play-off	W 61–60	14–9 (9–2)	Keaney Gymnasium; Kingston, RI
3/6/1964*		Syracuse; Rivalry	L 49–58	14–10	Hugh S. Greer Field House; Storrs, CT
NCAA Tournament
3/9/1964*		vs. Temple; First Round	W 53–48	15–10	Philadelphia, PA
3/14/1964*		vs. Princeton; Sweet Sixteen	W 52–50	16–10	Reynolds Coliseum; Raleigh, NC
3/16/1964*		vs. Duke; Elite Eight	L 54–101	16–11	Reynolds Coliseum; Raleigh, NC
*Non-conference game. ^{#}Rankings from AP Poll. (#) Tournament seedings in parentheses. All times are in Eastern Time.

Schedule Source:
