= 1960–61 Connecticut Huskies men's basketball team =

American college basketball season

1960–61 Connecticut Huskies men's basketball
- Conference: Yankee Conference
- Record: 11–13 (6–4 YC)
- Head coach: Hugh Greer (15th season)
- Assistant coaches: Don Burns; Nick Rodis
- Home arena: Hugh S. Greer Field House

1960–61 Yankee Conference men's basketball standings
	Conf.				Overall
Team	W		L	PCT	W		L	PCT
Rhode Island	9	–	1	.900	18	–	9	.667
Maine	7	–	3	.700	18	–	5	.783
Connecticut	6	–	4	.600	11	–	13	.458
Massachusetts	4	–	6	.400	16	–	10	.615
Vermont	3	–	7	.300	9	–	11	.450
New Hampshire	1	–	9	.100	6	–	18	.250

The 1960–61 Connecticut Huskies men's basketball team represented the University of Connecticut in the 1960–61 collegiate men's basketball season. The Huskies completed the season with an 11–13 overall record. The Huskies were members of the Yankee Conference, where they ended the season with a 6–4 record. The Huskies played their home games at Hugh S. Greer Field House in Storrs, Connecticut, and were led by fifteenth-year head coach Hugh Greer.

During this season, three of Connecticut's players from this season's team in Glenn Cross, Pete Kelly, and Jack Rose (alongside a Connecticut football player named William Minnerly) were discovered to have been involved in the 1961 NCAA University Division men's basketball gambling scandal after noting a fix was going down on the March 3, 1961 game against Colgate University, which resulted in a 71–30 blowout win for Colgate. This led to the three players receiving permanent bannings from the NBA entirely, as well as the undergraduate players being expelled from the University of Connecticut following this season's conclusion.

== Schedule ==
Date time, TV	Rank^{#}	Opponent^{#}	Result	Record	Site (attendance) city, state
Regular Season
12/1/1960*		American International	W 78–56	1–0	Hugh S. Greer Field House; Storrs, CT
12/3/1960*		at Yale	L 55–63	1–1	Payne Whitney Gymnasium; New Haven, CT
12/9/1960*		at Boston College	L 96–110	1–2	Roberts Center; Boston, MA
12/13/1960		Massachusetts	W 72–70	2–2 (1–0)	Hugh S. Greer Field House; Storrs, CT
12/15/1960		at Vermont	W 84–73	3–2 (2–0)	Burlington, VT
12/17/1960*		Fordham	W 74–71	4–2	Hugh S. Greer Field House; Storrs, CT
12/20/1960*		Brown	W 85–71	5–2	Hugh S. Greer Field House; Storrs, CT
12/31/1960*		vs. Drake; Queen City Invitational	L 81–90	5–3	Buffalo, NY
1/2/1961*		vs. Princeton; Queen City Invitational	L 68–76	5–4	Buffalo, NY
1/4/1961*		Rutgers	W 95–74	6–4	Hugh S. Greer Field House; Storrs, CT
1/7/1961*		at Holy Cross	L 85–103	6–5	Worcester, MA
1/10/1961*		at Boston University	L 73–77	6–6	Boston, MA
1/12/1961		at New Hampshire	W 79–77	7–6 (3–0)	Lundholm Gym; Durham, NH
1/14/1961		Rhode Island	W 74–68	8–6 (4–0)	Hugh S. Greer Field House; Storrs, CT
1/28/1961		Vermont	W 81–61	9–6 (5–0)	Hugh S. Greer Field House; Storrs, CT
1/31/1961		at Maine	L 55–74	9–7 (5–1)	Memorial Gymnasium; Orono, ME
2/2/1961*		at Manhattan	W 73–71	10–7	New York, NY
2/8/1961		New Hampshire	L 84–91	10–8 (5–2)	Hugh S. Greer Field House; Storrs, CT
2/11/1961		Maine	W 73–60	11–8 (6–2)	Hugh S. Greer Field House; Storrs, CT
2/14/1961		at Massachusetts	L 54–74	11–9 (6–3)	Curry Hicks Cage; Amherst, MA
2/18/1961*		Holy Cross	L 89–98	11–10	Hugh S. Greer Field House; Storrs, CT
2/25/1961*		at Georgetown; Rivalry	L 80–99	11–11	McDonough Gymnasium; Washington, D.C.
3/3/1961*		at Colgate	L 30–71	11–12	Cotterell Court; Hamilton, NY
3/4/1961		at Rhode Island	L 61–73	11–13 (6–4)	Keaney Gymnasium; Kingston, RI
*Non-conference game. ^{#}Rankings from AP Poll. (#) Tournament seedings in parentheses. All times are in Eastern Time.

Schedule Source:
