= 1965–66 Connecticut Huskies men's basketball team =

American college basketball season

1965–66 Connecticut Huskies men's basketball

Yankee Conference Regular Season Co-Champions
- Conference: Yankee Conference
- Record: 16–8 (9–2 YC)
- Head coach: Fred Shabel (3rd season)
- Assistant coach: Burr Carlson
- Home arena: Hugh S. Greer Field House

1965–66 Yankee Conference men's basketball standings
	Conf.				Overall
Team	W		L	PCT	W		L	PCT
Rhode Island	9	–	1	.900	20	–	8	.714
Connecticut	9	–	1	.900	16	–	8	.667
Massachusetts	5	–	5	.500	11	–	13	.458
Maine	4	–	6	.400	9	–	13	.409
Vermont	3	–	7	.300	12	–	8	.600
New Hampshire	0	–	10	.000	3	–	21	.125

The 1965–66 Connecticut Huskies men's basketball team represented the University of Connecticut in the 1965–66 collegiate men's basketball season. The Huskies completed the season with a 16–8 overall record. The Huskies were members of the Yankee Conference, where they ended the season with a 9–2 record. They were the Yankee Conference Regular Season Co-Champions. The Huskies played their home games at Hugh S. Greer Field House in Storrs, Connecticut, and were led by third-year head coach Fred Shabel.

== Schedule ==
Date time, TV	Rank^{#}	Opponent^{#}	Result	Record	Site (attendance) city, state
Regular Season
12/1/1965*		at American International	W 89–72	1–0	Springfield, MA
12/4/1965*		Yale	W 95–73	2–0	Hugh S. Greer Field House; Storrs, CT
12/7/1965*		Manhattan	W 76–55	3–0	Hugh S. Greer Field House; Storrs, CT
12/11/1965*		Boston College	L 74–90	3–1	Hugh S. Greer Field House; Storrs, CT
12/13/1965		at Maine	W 84–69	4–1 (1–0)	Memorial Gymnasium; Orono, ME
12/18/1965*		at Syracuse; Rivalry	L 62–87	4–2	Manley Field House; Syracuse, NY
12/21/1965*		at Fordham	L 62–72	4–3	Rose Hill Gymnasium; New York, NY
12/28/1965*		at Baylor	W 96–88	5–3	Extraco Events Center; Waco, TX
12/30/1965*		at Southern Methodist	L 66–80	5–4	Moody Coliseum; Dallas, TX
1/5/1966*		Holy Cross	L 72–73	5–5	Hugh S. Greer Field House; Storrs, CT
1/12/1966		New Hampshire	W 119–74	6–5 (2–0)	Hugh S. Greer Field House; Storrs, CT
1/15/1966		at Rhode Island	L 68–82	6–6 (2–1)	Keaney Gymnasium; Kingston, RI
1/28/1966*		Colgate	W 97–94	7–6	Hugh S. Greer Field House; Storrs, CT
1/29/1966		Vermont	W 96–64	8–6 (3–1)	Hugh S. Greer Field House; Storrs, CT
2/2/1966		at Massachusetts	W 90–60	9–6 (4–1)	Curry Hicks Cage; Amherst, MA
2/5/1966		Maine	W 114–58	10–6 (5–1)	Hugh S. Greer Field House; Storrs, CT
2/8/1966*		at Boston University	W 62–43	11–6	Boston, MA
2/12/1966*		at Holy Cross	L 70–73	11–7	Worcester, MA
2/15/1966		at New Hampshire	W 113–62	12–7 (6–1)	Lundholm Gym; Durham, NH
2/19/1966		Massachusetts	W 91–64	13–7 (7–1)	Hugh S. Greer Field House; Storrs, CT
2/23/1966*		at Rutgers	W 96–84	14–7	College Avenue Gymnasium; Newark, NJ
2/26/1966		at Vermont	W 92–70	15–7 (8–1)	Patrick Gym; Burlington, VT
3/1/1966		Rhode Island	W 96–74	16–7 (9–1)	Hugh S. Greer Field House; Storrs, CT
3/4/1966		Rhode Island; Yankee Conference Play-off	L 62–67	16–8 (9–2)	Hugh S. Greer Field House; Storrs, CT
*Non-conference game. ^{#}Rankings from AP Poll. (#) Tournament seedings in parentheses. All times are in Eastern Time.

Schedule Source:
