= 1958–59 Connecticut Huskies men's basketball team =

American college basketball season

1958–59 Connecticut Huskies men's basketball

Yankee Conference Regular Season Champions

NCAA University Division Tournament, First Round
- Conference: Yankee Conference
- Record: 17–7 (8–2 YC)
- Head coach: Hugh Greer (13th season)
- Assistant coach: Nick Rodis
- Home arena: Hugh S. Greer Field House

1958–59 Yankee Conference men's basketball standings
	Conf.				Overall
Team	W		L	PCT	W		L	PCT
Connecticut	8	–	2	.800	17	–	7	.708
Maine	7	–	3	.700	15	–	7	.682
Massachusetts	5	–	5	.500	11	–	13	.458
Rhode Island	5	–	5	.500	8	–	12	.400
Vermont	4	–	6	.400	12	–	10	.545
New Hampshire	1	–	9	.100	9	–	14	.391

The 1958–59 Connecticut Huskies men's basketball team represented the University of Connecticut in the 1958–59 collegiate men's basketball season. The Huskies completed the season with a 17–7 overall record. The Huskies were members of the Yankee Conference, where they ended the season with an 8–2 record. They were the Yankee Conference regular season champions and made it to the first round in the 1959 NCAA Division I men's basketball tournament. The Huskies played their home games at Hugh S. Greer Field House in Storrs, Connecticut, and were led by thirteenth-year head coach Hugh Greer.

== Schedule ==
Date time, TV	Rank^{#}	Opponent^{#}	Result	Record	Site (attendance) city, state
Regular Season
12/3/1958*		American International	W 76–63	1–0	Hugh S. Greer Field House; Storrs, CT
12/6/1958*		at Yale	W 60–52	2–0	Payne Whitney Gymnasium; New Haven, CT
12/9/1958		New Hampshire	W 77–46	3–0 (1–0)	Hugh S. Greer Field House; Storrs, CT
12/13/1958*		at Boston College	L 55–81	3–1	Roberts Center; Boston, MA
12/15/1958		Massachusetts	W 71–67	4–1 (2–0)	Hugh S. Greer Field House; Storrs, CT
12/17/1958*		at Colgate	W 72–57	5–1	Cotterell Court; Hamilton, NY
12/20/1958*		vs. Manhattan	W 59–57	6–1	Madison Square Garden; New York, NY
12/22/1958*		Georgetown; Rivalry	W 76–68	7–1	Hugh S. Greer Field House; Storrs, CT
12/27/1958*		Temple	W 64–46	8–1	Hugh S. Greer Field House; Storrs, CT
1/3/1959*		Fordham	W 74–63	9–1	Hugh S. Greer Field House; Storrs, CT
1/6/1959		Maine	W 73–58	10–1 (3–0)	Hugh S. Greer Field House; Storrs, CT
1/10/1959*		Holy Cross	L 50–74	10–2	Hugh S. Greer Field House; Storrs, CT
1/13/1959		at New Hampshire	W 65–51	11–2 (4–0)	Lundholm Gym; Durham, NH
1/17/1959		at Vermont	W 82–69	12–2 (5–0)	Burlington, VT
1/31/1959		Maine	W 72–61	13–2 (6–0)	Hugh S. Greer Field House; Storrs, CT
2/7/1959		Vermont	L 60–61	13–3 (6–1)	Hugh S. Greer Field House; Storrs, CT
2/10/1959*		at Boston University	L 55–67	13–4	Boston, MA
2/14/1959		Rhode Island	W 70–64	14–4 (7–1)	Hugh S. Greer Field House; Storrs, CT
2/16/1959		at Massachusetts	L 79–80 ^{OT}	14–5 (7–2)	Curry Hicks Cage; Amherst, MA
2/18/1959*		Syracuse; Rivalry	L 64–72	14–6	Hugh S. Greer Field House; Storrs, CT
2/21/1959*		at Holy Cross	W 71–69	15–6	Worcester, MA
3/4/1959		at Rhode Island	W 87–63	16–6 (8–2)	Keaney Gymnasium; Kingston, RI
3/7/1959*		at Rutgers	W 80–55	17–6	College Avenue Gymnasium; Newark, NJ
NCAA Tournament
3/10/1959*		vs. Boston University; First Round	L 58–60	17–7	Madison Square Garden; New York, NY
*Non-conference game. ^{#}Rankings from AP Poll. (#) Tournament seedings in parentheses. All times are in Eastern Time.

Schedule Source:
