= 1955–56 Connecticut Huskies men's basketball team =

American college basketball season

1955–56 Connecticut Huskies men's basketball

Yankee Conference regular season champions

NCAA tournament, Sweet Sixteen
- Conference: Yankee Conference
- Record: 17–11 (7–1 YC)
- Head coach: Hugh Greer (10th season)
- Assistant coach: Nick Rodis
- Home arena: Hugh S. Greer Field House

1955–56 Yankee Conference men's basketball standings
	Conf.				Overall
Team	W		L	PCT	W		L	PCT
Connecticut	6	–	1	.857	17	–	11	.607
Massachusetts	5	–	1	.833	17	–	6	.739
Rhode Island	6	–	2	.750	11	–	14	.440
Vermont	2	–	3	.400	6	–	12	.333
Maine	3	–	5	.375	6	–	12	.333
New Hampshire	0	–	10	.000	2	–	15	.118

The 1955–56 Connecticut Huskies men's basketball team represented the University of Connecticut in the 1955–56 collegiate men's basketball season. The Huskies completed the season with a 17–11 overall record. The Huskies were members of the Yankee Conference, where they ended the season with a 7–1 record. They were the Yankee Conference regular season champions and made it to the sweet sixteen in the 1956 NCAA Division I men's basketball tournament. The Huskies played their home games at Hugh S. Greer Field House in Storrs, Connecticut, and were led by tenth-year head coach Hugh Greer.

== Schedule ==
Date time, TV	Rank^{#}	Opponent^{#}	Result	Record	Site (attendance) city, state
Regular season
12/1/1955*		American International	W 91–76	1–0	Hugh S. Greer Field House; Storrs, CT
12/5/1955		New Hampshire	W 83–63	2–0 (1–0)	Hugh S. Greer Field House; Storrs, CT
12/7/1955*		Yale	L 87–92	2–1	Hugh S. Greer Field House; Storrs, CT
12/16/1955*		at St. Joseph's (PA)	W 71–66	3–1	Hagan Arena; Philadelphia, PA
12/19/1955*		Manhattan	L 82–85	3–2	Hugh S. Greer Field House; Storrs, CT
12/22/1955*		at NYU	W 90–82	4–2	New York, NY
12/28/1955*		vs. Brown; New England Tournament	W 72–66	5–2	Waterville, ME
12/29/1955		vs. Massachusetts; New England Tournament	W 73–69	6–2 (2–0)	Waterville, ME
12/30/1955*		at Colby; New England Tournament	W 79–71	7–2	Waterville, ME
1/4/1956*		Holy Cross	L 68–85	7–3	Hugh S. Greer Field House; Storrs, CT
1/7/1956		at Rhode Island	W 88–86	8–3 (3–0)	Keaney Gymnasium; Kingston, RI
1/14/1956*		Boston College	W 88–57	9–3	Hugh S. Greer Field House; Storrs, CT
1/17/1956		at New Hampshire	W 93–56	10–3 (4–0)	Lundholm Gym; Durham, NH
1/27/1956*		at Syracuse; Rivalry	L 82–102	10–4	Oncenter War Memorial Arena; Syracuse, NY
1/28/1956*		at Colgate	W 82–80	11–4	Hamilton, NY
2/1/1956*		at Fordham	L 72–82	11–5	Rose Hill Gymnasium; New York, NY
2/4/1956*		Niagara	L 81–84	11–6	Hugh S. Greer Field House; Storrs, CT
2/6/1956		Maine	W 94–68	12–6 (5–0)	Hugh S. Greer Field House; Storrs, CT
2/7/1956*		Rutgers	W 105–85	13–6	Hugh S. Greer Field House; Storrs, CT
2/10/1956		Maine	W 109–96	14–6 (6–0)	Hugh S. Greer Field House; Storrs, CT
2/11/1956*		at Colby	L 88–93	14–7	Waterville, ME
2/16/1956*		Northeastern	W 80–74	15–7	Hugh S. Greer Field House; Storrs, CT
2/18/1956		Rhode Island	W 93–90	16–7 (7–0)	Hugh S. Greer Field House; Storrs, CT
2/21/1956		at Massachusetts	L 85–87	16–8 (7–1)	Curry Hicks Cage; Amherst, MA
2/27/1956*		at Holy Cross	L 75–84	16–9	Worcester, MA
NCAA tournament
3/13/1956*		vs. Manhattan; First round	W 84–75	17–9	New York, NY
3/16/1956*		vs. Temple; Sweet Sixteen	L 59–65	17–10	Philadelphia, PA
3/17/1956*		vs. Dartmouth; Consolation round	L 64–85	17–11	Philadelphia, PA
*Non-conference game. ^{#}Rankings from AP Poll. (#) Tournament seedings in parentheses. All times are in Eastern Time.

Schedule Source:
