= 1956–57 Connecticut Huskies men's basketball team =

American college basketball season

1956–57 Connecticut Huskies men's basketball

Yankee Conference Regular Season Champions

NCAA University Division Tournament, First Round
- Conference: Yankee Conference
- Record: 17–8 (8–0 YC)
- Head coach: Hugh Greer (11th season)
- Assistant coach: Nick Rodis
- Home arena: Hugh S. Greer Field House

1956–57 Yankee Conference men's basketball standings
	Conf.				Overall
Team	W		L	PCT	W		L	PCT
Connecticut	8	–	0	1.000	17	–	8	.680
Rhode Island	6	–	3	.667	11	–	11	.500
Vermont	3	–	2	.600	15	–	5	.750
Massachusetts	4	–	4	.500	13	–	11	.542
Maine	2	–	6	.250	6	–	14	.300
New Hampshire	1	–	9	.100	3	–	16	.158

The 1956–57 Connecticut Huskies men's basketball team represented the University of Connecticut in the 1956–57 collegiate men's basketball season. The Huskies completed the season with a 17–8 overall record. The Huskies were members of the Yankee Conference, where they ended the season with an 8–0 record. They were the Yankee Conference regular season champions and made it to the first round in the 1957 NCAA Division I men's basketball tournament. The Huskies played their home games at Hugh S. Greer Field House in Storrs, Connecticut, and were led by eleventh-year head coach Hugh Greer.

== Schedule ==
Date time, TV	Rank^{#}	Opponent^{#}	Result	Record	Site (attendance) city, state
Regular Season
12/1/1956*		Colby	W 103–89	1–0	Hugh S. Greer Field House; Storrs, CT
12/3/1956		New Hampshire	W 98–50	2–0 (1–0)	Hugh S. Greer Field House; Storrs, CT
12/6/1956*		at Yale	W 77–66	3–0	Payne Whitney Gymnasium; New Haven, CT
12/11/1956*		at Rutgers	W 88–75	4–0	College Avenue Gymnasium; Newark, NJ
12/15/1956*		Boston College	L 81–87	4–1	Hugh S. Greer Field House; Storrs, CT
12/22/1956*		at Manhattan	L 86–100	4–2	New York, NY
12/27/1956*		at Miami; Orange Bowl Tournament	W 74–70	5–2	Miami Beach Convention Center; Miami, FL
12/28/1956*		vs. Stanford; Orange Bowl Tournament	W 57–56	6–2	Miami Beach Convention Center; Miami, FL
12/29/1956*		vs. Pittsburgh; Orange Bowl Tournament	W 64–50 ^{OT}	7–2	Miami Beach Convention Center; Miami, FL
1/2/1957*		Dartmouth	L 67–70 ^{OT}	7–3	Hugh S. Greer Field House; Storrs, CT
1/5/1957*		Yale	L 64–66	7–4	Hugh S. Greer Field House; Storrs, CT
1/7/1957*		Syracuse; Rivalry	L 78–79	7–5	Hugh S. Greer Field House; Storrs, CT
1/12/1957*		Holy Cross	W 92–72	8–5	Hugh S. Greer Field House; Storrs, CT
1/15/1957		at New Hampshire	W 94–54	9–5 (2–0)	Lundholm Gym; Durham, NH
1/26/1957*		at Colgate	L 86–96	9–6	Hamilton, NY
1/30/1957		at Maine	W 124–92	10–6 (3–0)	Memorial Gymnasium; Orono, ME
2/2/1957*		Fordham	L 67–68	10–7	Hugh S. Greer Field House; Storrs, CT
2/5/1957		at Massachusetts	W 97–71	11–7 (4–0)	Curry Hicks Cage; Amherst, MA
2/9/1957		Maine	W 118–81	12–7 (5–0)	Hugh S. Greer Field House; Storrs, CT
2/16/1957		Rhode Island	W 88–79	13–7 (6–0)	Hugh S. Greer Field House; Storrs, CT
2/19/1957		Massachusetts	W 90–77	14–7 (7–0)	Hugh S. Greer Field House; Storrs, CT
2/23/1957*		American International	W 118–88	15–7	Hugh S. Greer Field House; Storrs, CT
2/26/1957*		at Holy Cross	W 97–80	16–7	Worcester, MA
3/2/1957		at Rhode Island	W 94–93	17–7 (8–0)	Keaney Gymnasium; Kingston, RI
NCAA Tournament
3/12/1957*		vs. Syracuse; First Round/Rivalry	L 76–82	17–8	New York, NY
*Non-conference game. ^{#}Rankings from AP Poll. (#) Tournament seedings in parentheses. All times are in Eastern Time.

Schedule Source:
