= 1957–58 Connecticut Huskies men's basketball team =

American college basketball season

1957–58 Connecticut Huskies men's basketball

Yankee Conference Regular Season Champions

NCAA University Division Tournament, First Round
- Conference: Yankee Conference
- Record: 17–10 (9–1 YC)
- Head coach: Hugh Greer (12th season)
- Assistant coach: Nick Rodis
- Home arena: Hugh S. Greer Field House

1957–58 Yankee Conference men's basketball standings
	Conf.				Overall
Team	W		L	PCT	W		L	PCT
Connecticut	9	–	1	.900	17	–	10	.630
Vermont	5	–	5	.500	15	–	10	.600
Massachusetts	5	–	5	.500	13	–	12	.520
New Hampshire	4	–	6	.400	10	–	12	.455
Maine	4	–	6	.400	8	–	12	.400
Rhode Island	3	–	7	.300	4	–	17	.190

The 1957–58 Connecticut Huskies men's basketball team represented the University of Connecticut in the 1957–58 collegiate men's basketball season. The Huskies completed the season with a 17–10 overall record. The Huskies were members of the Yankee Conference, where they ended the season with a 9–1 record. They were the Yankee Conference regular season champions and made it to the first round in the 1958 NCAA Division I men's basketball tournament. The Huskies played their home games at Hugh S. Greer Field House in Storrs, Connecticut, and were led by twelve-year head coach Hugh Greer.

== Schedule ==
Date time, TV	Rank^{#}	Opponent^{#}	Result	Record	Site (attendance) city, state
Regular Season
12/2/1957*		American International	W 84–55	1–0	Hugh S. Greer Field House; Storrs, CT
12/4/1957		at Massachusetts	W 99–57	2–0 (1–0)	Curry Hicks Cage; Amherst, MA
12/7/1957*		Yale	L 74–79	2–1	Hugh S. Greer Field House; Storrs, CT
12/9/1957		at New Hampshire	W 90–50	3–1 (2–0)	Lundholm Gym; Durham, NH
12/11/1957*		Rutgers	W 73–63	4–1	Hugh S. Greer Field House; Storrs, CT
12/14/1957*		Boston College	L 68–82	4–2	Hugh S. Greer Field House; Storrs, CT
12/18/1957*		Colgate	W 82–61	5–2	Hugh S. Greer Field House; Storrs, CT
12/26/1957*		vs. Seattle University; ECAC Holiday Festival	L 67–83	5–3	Madison Square Garden; New York, NY
12/28/1957*		vs. NYU; ECAC Holiday Festival	W 74–68	6–3	Madison Square Garden; New York, NY
12/30/1957*		vs. Pittsburgh; ECAC Holiday Festival	W 68–60	7–3	Madison Square Garden; New York, NY
1/4/1958*		Manhattan	L 57–62	7–4	Hugh S. Greer Field House; Storrs, CT
1/11/1958*		Holy Cross	W 77–68	8–4	Hugh S. Greer Field House; Storrs, CT
1/14/1958		New Hampshire	W 81–69	9–4 (3–0)	Hugh S. Greer Field House; Storrs, CT
1/18/1958		Vermont	W 99–85	10–4 (4–0)	Hugh S. Greer Field House; Storrs, CT
1/30/1958		Maine	W 84–62	11–4 (5–0)	Hugh S. Greer Field House; Storrs, CT
2/1/1958*		at Fordham	L 70–86	11–5	Rose Hill Gymnasium; New York, NY
2/4/1958*		Pittsburgh	L 62–77	11–6	Hugh S. Greer Field House; Storrs, CT
2/6/1958		at Vermont	W 107–95	12–6 (6–0)	Burlington, VT
2/8/1958		at Maine	W 103–62	13–6 (7–0)	Memorial Gymnasium; Orono, ME
2/10/1958*		Boston University	W 77–71	14–6	Hugh S. Greer Field House; Storrs, CT
2/12/1958*		at Northeastern	W 87–59	15–6	Matthews Arena; Boston, MA
2/15/1958		at Rhode Island	W 102–57	16–6 (8–0)	Keaney Gymnasium; Kingston, RI
2/18/1958		Massachusetts	W 86–72	17–6 (9–0)	Hugh S. Greer Field House; Storrs, CT
2/25/1958*		at Holy Cross	L 89–92	17–7	Worcester, MA
3/1/1958		Rhode Island	L 81–85	17–8 (9–1)	Hugh S. Greer Field House; Storrs, CT
3/8/1958*		at Syracuse; Rivalry	L 70–75	17–9	Oncenter War Memorial Arena; Syracuse, NY
NCAA Tournament
3/11/1958*		vs. Dartmouth; First Round	L 64–75	17–10	Madison Square Garden; New York, NY
*Non-conference game. ^{#}Rankings from AP Poll. (#) Tournament seedings in parentheses. All times are in Eastern Time.

Schedule Source:
