= 1962–63 Connecticut Huskies men's basketball team =

American college basketball season

1962–63 Connecticut Huskies men's basketball

Yankee Conference Regular Season Champions

NCAA University Division Tournament, First Round
- Conference: Yankee Conference
- Record: 18–7 (9–1 YC)
- Head coach: Hugh Greer (17th year); George Wigton (1st year)
- Assistant coach: George L. Wigton
- Home arena: Hugh S. Greer Field House

1962–63 Yankee Conference men's basketball standings
	Conf.				Overall
Team	W		L	PCT	W		L	PCT
Connecticut	9	–	1	.900	18	–	7	.720
Rhode Island	8	–	2	.800	15	–	11	.577
Massachusetts	6	–	4	.600	12	–	12	.500
Maine	3	–	7	.300	8	–	15	.348
Vermont	2	–	8	.200	10	–	13	.435
New Hampshire	2	–	8	.200	7	–	17	.292

The 1962–63 Connecticut Huskies men's basketball team represented the University of Connecticut in the 1962–63 collegiate men's basketball season. The Huskies completed the season with an 18–7 overall record. The Huskies were members of the Yankee Conference, where they ended the season with a 9–1 record. They were the Yankee Conference Regular Season Champions and made it to the first round of the 1963 NCAA Division I men's basketball tournament. The Huskies played their home games at Hugh S. Greer Field House in Storrs, Connecticut, and were led by seventeenth-year head coach Hugh Greer and first-year head coach George Wigton.

Hugh Greer led UConn until he died on January 14, 1963, of a massive heart attack. Assistant George Wigton finished out the season and led them to the NCAA Tournament. UConn credits the first 10 games of the season to Greer and the rest of the season (including the NCAA Tournament) to Wigton.

== Schedule ==
Date time, TV	Rank^{#}	Opponent^{#}	Result	Record	Site (attendance) city, state
Regular Season
12/1/1962*		at Yale	W 61–49	1–0	Payne Whitney Gymnasium; New Haven, CT
12/8/1962*		at Boston College	W 63–53	2–0	Roberts Center; Boston, MA
12/12/1962		Massachusetts	W 85–61	3–0 (1–0)	Hugh S. Greer Field House; Storrs, CT
12/15/1962*		Fordham	L 66–75	3–1	Hugh S. Greer Field House; Storrs, CT
12/17/1962*		American International	W 64–58	4–1	Hugh S. Greer Field House; Storrs, CT
12/18/1962*		at Loyola (New Orleans)	L 49–51	4–2	The Den; New Orleans, LA
1/5/1963*		at Holy Cross	L 50–74	4–3	Worcester Memorial Auditorium; Worcester, MA
1/8/1963		at New Hampshire	W 86–58	5–3 (2–0)	Lundholm Gym; Durham, NH
1/11/1963		Vermont	W 88–67	6–3 (3–0)	Hugh S. Greer Field House; Storrs, CT
1/12/1963		Maine	W 92–64	7–3 (4–0)	Hugh S. Greer Field House; Storrs, CT
1/24/1963*		Canisius	L 65–74	7–4	Hugh S. Greer Field House; Storrs, CT
1/29/1963*		Boston University	W 90–76	8–4	Hugh S. Greer Field House; Storrs, CT
2/2/1963		at Vermont	W 95–62	9–4 (5–0)	Patrick Gym; Burlington, VT
2/6/1963*		American International	W 93–67	10–4	Hugh S. Greer Field House; Storrs, CT
2/9/1963		at Maine	W 89–61	11–4 (6–0)	Memorial Gymnasium; Orono, ME
2/12/1963		at Massachusetts	W 79–66	12–4 (7–0)	Curry Hicks Cage; Amherst, MA
2/16/1963*		Holy Cross	W 85–75	13–4	Hugh S. Greer Field House; Storrs, CT
2/19/1963		at Rhode Island	L 62–65	13–5 (7–1)	Keaney Gymnasium; Kingston, RI
2/21/1963*		at Manhattan	W 68–64	14–5	Alumni Gym; New York, NY
2/23/1963*		Rutgers	W 88–63	15–5	Hugh S. Greer Field House; Storrs, CT
2/26/1963		New Hampshire	W 102–72	16–5 (8–1)	Hugh S. Greer Field House; Storrs, CT
3/2/1963		Rhode Island	W 88–73	17–5 (9–1)	Hugh S. Greer Field House; Storrs, CT
3/7/1963*		at Syracuse; Rivalry	W 92–74	18–5	Manley Field House; Syracuse, NY
3/9/1963*		at Colgate	L 67–69	18–6	Cotterell Court; Hamilton, NY
NCAA Tournament
3/11/1963*		vs. West Virginia; First Round	L 71–77	18–7	The Palestra; Philadelphia, PA
*Non-conference game. ^{#}Rankings from AP Poll. (#) Tournament seedings in parentheses. All times are in Eastern Time.

Schedule Source:
