= 1949–50 Connecticut Huskies men's basketball team =

American college basketball season

1949–50 Connecticut Huskies men's basketball
- Conference: Yankee Conference
- Record: 17–8 (5–2 YC)
- Head coach: Hugh Greer (4th season)
- Assistant coaches: James Connors; Charles Muzikevik
- Home arena: Hawley Armory

1949–50 Yankee Conference men's basketball standings
	Conf.				Overall
Team	W		L	PCT	W		L	PCT
Rhode Island State	6	–	1	.857	18	–	8	.692
Connecticut	5	–	2	.714	17	–	8	.680
Vermont	2	–	3	.400	9	–	11	.450
Massachusetts	2	–	3	.400	8	–	11	.421
Maine	3	–	5	.375	13	–	6	.684
New Hampshire	1	–	5	.167	4	–	11	.267

The 1949–50 Connecticut Huskies men's basketball team represented the University of Connecticut in the 1949–50 collegiate men's basketball season. The Huskies completed the season with a 17–8 overall record. The Huskies were members of the Yankee Conference, where they ended the season with a 5–2 record. The Huskies played their home games at Hawley Armory in Storrs, Connecticut, and were led by fourth-year head coach Hugh Greer.

== Schedule ==
Date time, TV	Rank^{#}	Opponent^{#}	Result	Record	Site (attendance) city, state
Regular Season
*		American International	W 66–51	1–0	Hawley Armory; Storrs, CT
*		Springfield	W 56–36	2–0	Hawley Armory; Storrs, CT
*		Tufts	W 56–39	3–0	Hawley Armory; Storrs, CT
*		at Brown	L 59–69	3–1	Marvel Gymnasium; Providence, RI
*		at Yale	L 44–62	3–2	Payne Whitney Gymnasium; New Haven, CT
*		Manhattan	L 56–71	3–3	Hawley Armory; Storrs, CT
*		Pittsburgh	L 35–52	3–4	Hawley Armory; Storrs, CT
*		Muhlenberg	L 61–73	3–5	Hawley Armory; Storrs, CT
		Maine	W 65–56	4–5 (1–0)	Hawley Armory; Storrs, CT
		at Rhode Island	L 65–83	4–6 (1–1)	Rodman Hall; Kingston, RI
*		Wayne	W 65–47	5–6	Hawley Armory; Storrs, CT
		at Massachusetts	L 57–61	5–7 (1–2)	Curry Hicks Cage; Amherst, MA
*		Northeastern	W 77–40	6–7	Hawley Armory; Storrs, CT
		New Hampshire	W 73–35	7–7 (2–2)	Hawley Armory; Storrs, CT
*		at Buffalo	W 56–40	8–7	Alumni Arena; Amherst, NY
*		at Dartmouth	W 78–71	9–7	Alumni Gymnasium; Hanover, NH
		at Vermont	W 61–44	10–7 (3–2)	Patrick Gym; Burlington, VT
*		at Springfield	L 58–59	10–8	Springfield, MA
*		Brown	W 74–60	11–8	Hawley Armory; Storrs, CT
*		at Wesleyan	W 82–58	12–8	Middletown, CT
*		at Bates	W 77–70	13–8	Lewiston, ME
		at Maine	W 67–58	14–8 (4–2)	Memorial Gymnasium; Orono, ME
*		Boston University	W 107–67	15–8	Hawley Armory; Storrs, CT
		Rhode Island	W 74–71	16–8 (5–2)	Hawley Armory; Storrs, CT
*		M.I.T.	W 82–44	17–8	Hawley Armory; Storrs, CT
*Non-conference game. ^{#}Rankings from AP Poll. (#) Tournament seedings in parentheses. All times are in Eastern Time.

Schedule Source:
