= 1951–52 Connecticut Huskies men's basketball team =

American college basketball season

1951–52 Connecticut Huskies men's basketball

Yankee Conference Regular Season Champions
- Conference: Yankee Conference
- Record: 20–7 (6–1 YC)
- Head coach: Hugh Greer (6th season)
- Home arena: Hawley Armory

1951–52 Yankee Conference men's basketball standings
	Conf.				Overall
Team	W		L	PCT	W		L	PCT
Connecticut	6	–	1	.857	20	–	7	.741
Rhode Island	6	–	2	.750	10	–	13	.435
Vermont	3	–	1	.750	14	–	6	.700
New Hampshire	4	–	5	.444	11	–	9	.550
Maine	2	–	6	.250	7	–	12	.368
Massachusetts	0	–	6	.000	4	–	17	.190

The 1951–52 Connecticut Huskies men's basketball team represented the University of Connecticut in the 1951–52 collegiate men's basketball season. The Huskies completed the season with a 20–7 overall record. The Huskies were members of the Yankee Conference, where they ended the season with a 6–1 record. They were the Yankee Conference regular season champions. The Huskies played their home games at Hawley Armory in Storrs, Connecticut, and were led by sixth-year head coach Hugh Greer.

== Schedule ==
Date time, TV	Rank^{#}	Opponent^{#}	Result	Record	Site (attendance) city, state
Regular Season
11/29/1951*		American International	W 75–55	1–0	Hawley Armory; Storrs, CT
12/1/1951*		St. Francis (NY)	L 69–77	1–1	Hawley Armory; Storrs, CT
12/5/1951*		Tufts	W 78–52	2–1	Hawley Armory; Storrs, CT
12/8/1951*		Buffalo	W 72–69	3–1	Hawley Armory; Storrs, CT
12/12/1951*		Brown	W 86–65	4–1	Hawley Armory; Storrs, CT
12/15/1951*		Boston College	L 53–57	4–2	Hawley Armory; Storrs, CT
12/18/1951*		at Yale	W 56–47	5–2	Payne Whitney Gymnasium; New Haven, CT
12/20/1951*		V.M.I.	W 63–47	6–2	Hawley Armory; Storrs, CT
12/21/1951*		V.M.I.	W 74–55	7–2	Hawley Armory; Storrs, CT
12/27/1951*		at Buffalo	L 58–65	7–3	Buffalo, NY
12/29/1951*		Puerto Rico	W 88–54	8–3	Hawley Armory; Storrs, CT
1/4/1952*		Wayne	W 59–58	9–3	Hawley Armory; Storrs, CT
1/5/1952		Maine	W 71–57	10–3 (1–0)	Hawley Armory; Storrs, CT
1/12/1952		at Rhode Island	L 62–64	10–4 (1–1)	Rodman Hall; Kingston, RI
1/16/1952*		at Wesleyan	W 69–38	11–4	Middletown, CT
1/17/1952		New Hampshire	W 75–58	12–4 (2–1)	Hawley Armory; Storrs, CT
1/26/1952*		at Colgate	L 54–76	12–5	Hamilton, NY
2/2/1952*		at Brown	W 63–59	13–5	Marvel Gymnasium; Providence, RI
2/4/1952*		at Boston University	W 70–64	14–5	Boston, MA
2/8/1952*		Bucknell	W 85–59	15–5	Hawley Armory; Storrs, CT
2/12/1952*		at Holy Cross	L 53–72	15–6	Worcester, MA
2/15/1952		at New Hampshire	W 65–61	16–6 (3–1)	Lundholm Gym; Durham, NH
2/16/1952		at Maine	W 66–53	17–6 (4–1)	Memorial Gymnasium; Orono, ME
2/23/1952		Rhode Island	W 72–67	18–6 (5–1)	Hawley Armory; Storrs, CT
2/27/1952		at Massachusetts	W 68–54	19–6 (6–1)	Curry Hicks Cage; Amherst, MA
3/1/1952*		at Villanova	W 63–58	20–6	Philadelphia, PA
3/5/1952*		at St. Francis (NY)	L 47–63	20–7	II Corps Artillery Armory; Brooklyn, NY
*Non-conference game. ^{#}Rankings from AP Poll. (#) Tournament seedings in parentheses. All times are in Eastern Time.

Schedule Source:
