= 1953–54 Connecticut Huskies men's basketball team =

American college basketball season

1953–54 Connecticut Huskies men's basketball

Yankee Conference regular season champions

NCAA tournament, first round
- Conference: Yankee Conference
- Record: 23–3 (8–0 YC)
- Head coach: Hugh Greer (8th season)
- Assistant coach: Stan Ward
- Home arena: Hawley Armory

1953–54 Yankee Conference men's basketball standings
	Conf.				Overall
Team	W		L	PCT	W		L	PCT
Connecticut	7	–	0	1.000	23	–	3	.885
Massachusetts	5	–	1	.833	13	–	9	.591
Rhode Island	4	–	4	.500	7	–	14	.333
New Hampshire	2	–	6	.250	8	–	10	.444
Vermont	1	–	2	.333	13	–	7	.650
Maine	1	–	7	.125	6	–	12	.333

The 1953–54 Connecticut Huskies men's basketball team represented the University of Connecticut in the 1953–54 collegiate men's basketball season. The Huskies completed the season with a 23–3 overall record. The Huskies were members of the Yankee Conference, where they ended the season with an 8–0 record. They were the Yankee Conference regular season champions and made it to the first round of the 1954 NCAA Division I men's basketball tournament. The Huskies played their home games at Hawley Armory in Storrs, Connecticut, and were led by eighth-year head coach Hugh Greer.

== Schedule ==
Date time, TV	Rank^{#}	Opponent^{#}	Result	Record	Site (attendance) city, state
Regular season
12/1/1953		at Rhode Island	W 90–81	1–0 (1–0)	Keaney Gymnasium; Kingston, RI
12/3/1953*		American International	W 77–49	2–0	Hawley Armory; Storrs, CT
12/5/1953*		Yale	W 56–52	3–0	Hawley Armory; Storrs, CT
12/8/1953*		at Colby	W 79–65	4–0	Wadsworth Gymnasium; Waterville, ME
12/12/1953*		at Bucknell	W 80–64	5–0	Lewisburg, PA
12/19/1953*		St. Joseph's (PA)	W 85–77	6–0	Hawley Armory; Storrs, CT
12/28/1953*		vs. Brown; New England Tournament	W 87–63	7–0	Alumni Gymnasium; Hanover, NH
12/29/1953*		vs. Springfield; New England Tournament	W 80–67	8–0	Alumni Gymnasium; Hanover, NH
12/30/1953*		at Dartmouth; New England Tournament	W 70–58	9–0	Alumni Gymnasium; Hanover, NH
1/5/1954		Maine	W 108–60	10–0 (2–0)	Hawley Armory; Storrs, CT
1/6/1954		New Hampshire	W 104–48	11–0 (3–0)	Hawley Armory; Storrs, CT
1/9/1954		Rhode Island	W 78–54	12–0 (4–0)	Hawley Armory; Storrs, CT
1/12/1954*		at Boston University	W 62–55	13–0	Boston, MA
1/16/1954*		Boston College	W 106–81	14–0	Hawley Armory; Storrs, CT
2/3/1954*		at Fordham	L 63–70	14–1	Rose Hill Gymnasium; New York, NY
2/6/1954*		at Colgate	L 68–74	14–2	Hamilton, NY
2/9/1954*		at Wagner	W 71–61	15–2	New York, NY
2/12/1954		at New Hampshire	W 107–68	16–2 (5–0)	Lundholm Gym; Durham, NH
2/13/1954		at Maine	W 102–61	17–2 (6–0)	Memorial Gymnasium; Orono, ME
2/16/1954*		Rutgers	W 91–78	18–2	Hawley Armory; Storrs, CT
2/20/1954		Rhode Island	W 79–74	19–2 (7–0)	Hawley Armory; Storrs, CT
2/25/1954		at Massachusetts	W 75–66	20–2 (8–0)	Curry Hicks Cage; Amherst, MA
2/27/1954*		at Holy Cross	W 78–77	21–2	Worcester, MA
3/1/1954*		Tufts	W 91–69	22–2	Hawley Armory; Storrs, CT
3/3/1954*		Columbia	W 80–64	23–2	Hawley Armory; Storrs, CT
NCAA tournament
3/8/1954*		vs. Navy; First round	L 80–85	23–3	Buffalo Memorial Auditorium; Buffalo, NY
*Non-conference game. ^{#}Rankings from AP Poll. (#) Tournament seedings in parentheses. All times are in Eastern Time.

Schedule Source:
