= 1950–51 Connecticut Huskies men's basketball team =

American college basketball season

1950–51 Connecticut Huskies men's basketball

Yankee Conference regular season Champions

NCAA tournament, first round
- Conference: Yankee Conference
- Record: 22–4 (6–1 YC)
- Head coach: Hugh Greer (5th season)
- Home arena: Hawley Armory

1950–51 Yankee Conference men's basketball standings
	Conf.				Overall
Team	W		L	PCT	W		L	PCT
Connecticut	6	–	1	.857	22	–	4	.846
Vermont	4	–	1	.800	14	–	6	.700
Rhode Island State	5	–	2	.714	13	–	15	.464
Maine	2	–	5	.286	5	–	13	.278
Massachusetts	1	–	3	.250	6	–	15	.286
New Hampshire	0	–	6	.000	4	–	12	.250

The 1950–51 Connecticut Huskies men's basketball team represented the University of Connecticut in the 1950–51 collegiate men's basketball season. The Huskies completed the season with a 22–4 overall record. The Huskies were members of the Yankee Conference, where they ended the season with a 6–1 record. They were the Yankee Conference regular season champions and made it to the first round of the 1951 NCAA Division I men's basketball tournament. The Huskies played their home games at Hawley Armory in Storrs, Connecticut, and were led by fifth-year head coach Hugh Greer.

== Schedule ==
Date time, TV	Rank^{#}	Opponent^{#}	Result	Record	Site (attendance) city, state
Regular Season
11/30/1950*		American International	W 68–46	1–0	Hawley Armory; Storrs, CT
12/2/1950*		Springfield	W 46–44	2–0	Hawley Armory; Storrs, CT
12/6/1950*		at Tufts	W 68–59	3–0	New York, NY
12/9/1950*		at Brown	W 64–58	4–0	Marvel Gymnasium; Providence, RI
12/13/1950*		Yale	W 71–65	5–0	Hawley Armory; Storrs, CT
12/15/1950*		at R.P.I.	L 67–72	5–1	Houston Field House; Troy, NY
12/16/1950*		at McGill	W 50–41	6–1	Montreal, QC
12/21/1950*		Colby	W 66–61	7–1	Hawley Armory; Storrs, CT
12/23/1950*		Boston College	W 56–52	8–1	Hawley Armory; Storrs, CT
12/26/1950*		at Buffalo	W 61–51	9–1	Buffalo, NY
1/5/1951		Maine	W 68–52	10–1 (1–0)	Hawley Armory; Storrs, CT
1/6/1951		Vermont	W 71–43	11–1 (2–0)	Hawley Armory; Storrs, CT
1/10/1951*		at Northeastern	W 75–55	12–1	Matthews Arena; Boston, MA
1/13/1951		Rhode Island	L 72–77	12–2 (2–1)	Hawley Armory; Storrs, CT
1/27/1951*		at Muhlenberg	W 52–44	13–2	Allentown, PA
1/30/1951*		at American International	W 66–55	14–2	Springfield, MA
2/3/1951*		at Springfield	W 54–49	15–2	Springfield, MA
2/7/1951*		Brown	L 58–60	15–3	Hawley Armory; Storrs, CT
2/10/1951*		Wesleyan	W 74–51	16–3	Hawley Armory; Storrs, CT
2/13/1951*		Temple	W 76–61	17–3	Hawley Armory; Storrs, CT
2/16/1951*		at New Hampshire	W 85–54	18–3 (3–1)	Lundholm Gym; Durham, NH
2/17/1951		at Maine	W 83–62	19–3 (4–1)	Memorial Gymnasium; Orono, ME
2/20/1951*		Boston University	W 74–59	20–3	Hawley Armory; Storrs, CT
2/24/1951		at Rhode Island	W 75–70	21–3 (5–1)	Rodman Hall; Kingston, RI
2/28/1951		Massachusetts	W 92–50	22–3 (6–1)	Hawley Armory; Storrs, CT
NCAA tournament
3/20/1951*		vs. St. John's; First Round	L 52–63	22–4	Madison Square Garden; New York, NY
*Non-conference game. ^{#}Rankings from AP Poll. (#) Tournament seedings in parentheses. All times are in Eastern Time.

Schedule Source:
