= 1952–53 Connecticut Huskies men's basketball team =

American college basketball season

1952–53 Connecticut Huskies men's basketball

Yankee Conference Regular Season Champions
- Conference: Yankee Conference
- Record: 17–4 (5–1 YC)
- Head coach: Hugh Greer (7th season)
- Assistant coaches: Stan Ward; Paul White
- Home arena: Hawley Armory

1952–53 Yankee Conference men's basketball standings
	Conf.				Overall
Team	W		L	PCT	W		L	PCT
Connecticut	5	–	1	.833	17	–	4	.810
Rhode Island	6	–	2	.750	13	–	10	.565
Maine	3	–	4	.429	7	–	10	.412
Vermont	1	–	2	.333	11	–	10	.524
New Hampshire	2	–	5	.286	8	–	10	.444
Massachusetts	1	–	4	.200	4	–	15	.211

The 1952–53 Connecticut Huskies men's basketball team represented the University of Connecticut in the 1952–53 collegiate men's basketball season. The Huskies completed the season with a 17–4 overall record. The Huskies were members of the Yankee Conference, where they ended the season with a 5–1 record. They were the Yankee Conference regular season champions. The Huskies played their home games at Hawley Armory in Storrs, Connecticut, and were led by seventh-year head coach Hugh Greer.

== Schedule ==
Date time, TV	Rank^{#}	Opponent^{#}	Result	Record	Site (attendance) city, state
Regular Season
12/3/1952*		American International	W 73–55	1–0	Hawley Armory; Storrs, CT
12/6/1952*		Rensselaer Polytechnic Institute	W 78–48	2–0	Hawley Armory; Storrs, CT
12/9/1952*		at Yale	W 76–68	3–0	Payne Whitney Gymnasium; New Haven, CT
12/13/1952*		Boston College	W 70–51	4–0	Hawley Armory; Storrs, CT
12/16/1952*		at Brown	W 81–62	5–0	Marvel Gymnasium; Providence, RI
12/20/1952*		Villanova	W 75–71	6–0	Hawley Armory; Storrs, CT
12/30/1952*		at Rutgers	W 82–73	7–0	College Avenue Gymnasium; Newark, NJ
1/3/1953		Maine	W 87–66	8–0 (1–0)	Hawley Armory; Storrs, CT
1/7/1953*		Holy Cross	L 67–71	8–1	Hawley Armory; Storrs, CT
1/10/1953		Rhode Island	W 80–74	9–1 (2–0)	Hawley Armory; Storrs, CT
1/14/1953*		at Columbia	L 59–71	9–2	University Heights Gymnasium; New York, NY
1/16/1953*		Colgate	W 65–64	10–2	Hawley Armory; Storrs, CT
2/7/1953*		at St. Joseph's (PA)	L 69–78	10–3	Hagan Arena; Philadelphia, PA
2/9/1953*		Wagner	W 64–61	11–3	Hawley Armory; Storrs, CT
2/13/1953		at New Hampshire	W 82–59	12–3 (3–0)	Lundholm Gym; Durham, NH
2/14/1953		at Maine	W 76–66	13–3 (4–0)	Memorial Gymnasium; Orono, ME
2/18/1953*		Brown	W 91–59	14–3	Hawley Armory; Storrs, CT
2/21/1953		at Rhode Island	L 80–82	14–4 (4–1)	Rodman Hall; Kingston, RI
2/26/1953		Massachusetts	W 89–51	15–4 (5–1)	Hawley Armory; Storrs, CT
2/28/1953*		Boston University	W 105–73	16–4	Hawley Armory; Storrs, CT
3/2/1953*		at Tufts	W 115–74	17–4	Boston, MA
*Non-conference game. ^{#}Rankings from AP Poll. (#) Tournament seedings in parentheses. All times are in Eastern Time.

Schedule Source:
