= 1948–49 Connecticut Huskies men's basketball team =

American college basketball season

1948–49 Connecticut Huskies men's basketball

Yankee Conference Regular Season Champions
- Conference: Yankee Conference
- Record: 19–6 (7–1 YC)
- Head coach: Hugh Greer (3rd season)
- Assistant coach: Charles Hovarth
- Home arena: Hawley Armory

1948–49 Yankee Conference men's basketball standings
	Conf.				Overall
Team	W		L	PCT	W		L	PCT
Connecticut	7	–	1	.875	19	–	6	.760
Rhode Island State	5	–	1	.833	16	–	6	.727
Vermont	2	–	1	.667	15	–	5	.750
Massachusetts	2	–	2	.500	6	–	12	.333
New Hampshire	2	–	6	.250	7	–	10	.412
Maine	0	–	7	.000	4	–	14	.222

The 1948–49 Connecticut Huskies men's basketball team represented the University of Connecticut in the 1948–49 collegiate men's basketball season. The Huskies completed the season with a 19–6 overall record. The Huskies were members of the Yankee Conference, where they ended the season with a 7–1 record. They were the Yankee Conference regular season champions. The Huskies played their home games at Hawley Armory in Storrs, Connecticut, and were led by third-year head coach Hugh Greer.

== Schedule ==
Date time, TV	Rank^{#}	Opponent^{#}	Result	Record	Site (attendance) city, state
Regular Season
*		American University	L 47–50	0–1	
*		Springfield	W 55–45	1–1	
*		Tufts	W 75–63	2–1	
*		Brown	W 58–41	3–1	
*		Yale	L 44–61	3–2	
*		Wesleyan	W 42–38	4–2	
		Vermont	W 72–48	5–2 (1–0)	
*		Wayne	W 44–39	6–2	
*		Buffalo	W 52–39	7–2	
*		New York University	L 51–70	7–3	
*		Colby	W 58–39	8–3	
		Maine	W 63–43	9–3 (2–0)	
		Rhode Island	W 58–48	10–3 (3–0)	
		Massachusetts	W 80–48	11–3 (4–0)	
		New Hampshire	W 66–37	12–3 (5–0)	
		Maine	W 58–29	13–3 (6–0)	
*		Coast Guard	W 60–47	14–3	
*		Boston University	W 44–43	15–3	
*		Wesleyan	W 62–41	16–3	
		New Hampshire	W 52–43	17–3 (7–0)	
*		Brown	L 45–57	17–4	
*		Brooklyn College	W 64–39	18–4	
		Rhode Island	L 64–86	18–5 (7–1)	
*		Yale	L 55–71	18–6	
*		M.I.T.	W 91–52	19–6	
*Non-conference game. ^{#}Rankings from AP Poll. (#) Tournament seedings in parentheses. All times are in Eastern Time.

Schedule Source:
