= 1945–46 Connecticut Huskies men's basketball team =

American college basketball season

1945–46 Connecticut Huskies men's basketball
- Conference: New England Conference
- Record: 11–6 (4–2 NEC)
- Head coach: Blair Gullion (1st season)
- Home arena: Hawley Armory

1945–46 New England Conference men's basketball standings
	Conf.				Overall
Team	W		L	PCT	W		L	PCT
Rhode Island State	4	–	0	1.000	21	–	3	.875
Connecticut	4	–	2	.667	11	–	6	.647
Maine	4	–	4	.500	10	–	4	.714
Northeastern	2	–	4	.333	4	–	13	.235
New Hampshire	0	–	3	.000	3	–	7	.300

The 1945–46 Connecticut Huskies men's basketball team represented University of Connecticut in the 1945–46 collegiate men's basketball season. The Huskies completed the season with an 11–6 overall record. The Huskies were members of the New England Conference, where they ended the season with a 4–2 record. The Huskies played their home games at Hawley Armory in Storrs, Connecticut, and were led by first-year head coach Blair Gullion.

== Schedule ==
Date time, TV	Rank^{#}	Opponent^{#}	Result	Record	Site (attendance) city, state
Regular Season
*		Brown	L 41–55	0–1	
*		U.S. Submarine Base	W 48–38	1–1	
*		Wesleyan	W 38–35	2–1	
		Northeastern	W 67–28	3–1 (1–0)	
*		New York University	L 55–61	3–2	
		Maine	W 54–33	4–2 (2–0)	
		Rhode Island	L 47–59	4–3 (2–1)	
*		Coast Guard	L 29–31	4–4	
*		Wesleyan	L 29–40	4–5	
		Maine	W 60–48	5–5 (3–1)	
*		Brown	W 51–44	6–5	
*		U.S. Submarine Base	W 44–31	7–5	
*		Army	W 51–50	8–5	
*		Coast Guard	W 37–31	9–5	
*		Providence	W 43–41	10–5	
		Northeastern	W 78–22	11–5 (4–1)	
		Rhode Island	L 54–60	11–6 (4–2)	
*Non-conference game. ^{#}Rankings from AP Poll. (#) Tournament seedings in parentheses. All times are in Eastern Time.

Schedule Source:
