= 1946–47 Connecticut Huskies men's basketball team =

American college basketball season

1946–47 Connecticut Huskies men's basketball
- Conference: Yankee Conference
- Record: 16–2 (6–1 YC)
- Head coach: Blair Gullion (2nd year); Hugh Greer (1st year)
- Assistant coach: Hugh Greer
- Home arena: Hawley Armory

1946–47 Yankee Conference men's basketball standings
| | Conf. | | | | Overall |
| Team | W | | L | PCT | W | | L | PCT |
|---|---|---|---|---|---|---|---|---|
| Vermont | 1 | – | 0 | 1.000 | 19 | – | 3 | .864 |
| Connecticut | 6 | – | 1 | .857 | 16 | – | 2 | .889 |
| Rhode Island State | 4 | – | 1 | .800 | 17 | – | 3 | .850 |
| Maine | 2 | – | 4 | .333 | 9 | – | 8 | .529 |
| Massachusetts | 0 | – | 2 | .000 | 4 | – | 12 | .250 |
| New Hampshire | 0 | – | 5 | .000 | 6 | – | 11 | .353 |

The 1946–47 Connecticut Huskies men's basketball team represented the University of Connecticut in the 1946–47 collegiate men's basketball season. The Huskies completed the season with a 16–2 overall record. The Huskies were members of the Yankee Conference, where they ended the season with a 6–1 record. The Huskies played their home games at Hawley Armory in Storrs, Connecticut, and were led by second-year head coach Blair Gullion and first-year head coach Hugh Greer.

== Schedule ==
| Date time, TV | Rank^{#} | Opponent^{#} | Result | Record | Site (attendance) city, state |
Regular Season
| * | | New York University | L 41–67 | 0–1 | |
| * | | Brown | W 65–44 | 1–1 | |
| * | | Wesleyan | W 53–34 | 2–1 | |
| * | | Northeastern | W 81–42 | 3–1 | |
| | | Maine | W 51–38 | 4–1 (1–0) | |
| | | Rhode Island | L 57–75 | 4–2 (1–1) | |
| | | Massachusetts | W 73–37 | 5–2 (2–1) | |
| * | | Coast Guard | W 61–29 | 6–2 | |
| | | New Hampshire | W 68–38 | 7–2 (3–1) | |
| | | Maine | W 88–39 | 8–2 (4–1) | |
| * | | Northeastern | W 77–31 | 9–2 | |
| * | | Army | W 41–39 | 10–2 | |
| * | | Coast Guard | W 74–39 | 11–2 | |
| * | | Yale | W 47–39 | 12–2 | |
| * | | Brown | W 72–41 | 13–2 | |
| | | New Hampshire | W 94–45 | 14–2 (5–1) | |
| | | Rhode Island | W 83–75 | 15–2 (6–1) | |
| * | | Providence | W 88–46 | 16–2 | |
*Non-conference game. ^{#}Rankings from AP Poll. (#) Tournament seedings in parentheses. All times are in Eastern Time.

Schedule Source:
