= 1947–48 Connecticut Huskies men's basketball team =

American college basketball season

1947–48 Connecticut Huskies men's basketball

Yankee Conference Regular Season Champions
- Conference: Yankee Conference
- Record: 17–6 (6–1 YC)
- Head coach: Hugh Greer (2nd season)
- Assistant coach: Charles Hovarth
- Home arena: Hawley Armory

1947–48 Yankee Conference men's basketball standings
	Conf.				Overall
Team	W		L	PCT	W		L	PCT
Connecticut	6	–	1	.857	17	–	6	.739
Rhode Island State	5	–	1	.833	17	–	6	.739
Vermont	2	–	1	.667	14	–	6	.700
Maine	2	–	5	.286	11	–	7	.611
New Hampshire	2	–	5	.286	5	–	12	.294
Massachusetts	0	–	4	.000	2	–	14	.125

The 1947–48 Connecticut Huskies men's basketball team represented the University of Connecticut in the 1947–48 collegiate men's basketball season. The Huskies completed the season with a 17–6 overall record. The Huskies were members of the Yankee Conference, where they ended the season with a 6–1 record. The Huskies played their home games at Hawley Armory in Storrs, Connecticut, and were led by second-year head coach Hugh Greer.

== Schedule ==
Date time, TV	Rank^{#}	Opponent^{#}	Result	Record	Site (attendance) city, state
Regular Season
*		American University	W 48–37	1–0	
*		St. Anselm's	W 69–55	2–0	
*		Arnold	W 45–35	3–0	
*		Brown	W 59–38	4–0	
*		New York University	L 55–68	4–1	
*		Wesleyan	W 54–37	5–1	
*		Northeastern	W 64–41	6–1	
*		Akron	L 48–60	6–2	
*		Western Reserve	L 49–63	6–3	
		Maine	W 63–29	7–3 (1–0)	
		Rhode Island	L 63–65	7–4 (1–1)	
		Massachusetts	W 58–20	8–4 (2–1)	
*		American University	W 52–48	9–4	
*		Yale	L 50–57	9–5	
		Maine	W 46–39	10–5 (3–1)	
*		Champlain	W 49–38	11–5	
		Vermont	W 54–39	12–5 (4–1)	
*		Coast Guard	W 52–40	13–5	
*		Army	W 50–49	14–5	
*		Brown	W 57–41	15–5	
		New Hampshire	W 70–47	16–5 (5–1)	
		Rhode Island	W 89–80	17–5 (6–1)	
*		Yale	L 53–57	17–6	
*Non-conference game. ^{#}Rankings from AP Poll. (#) Tournament seedings in parentheses. All times are in Eastern Time.

Schedule Source:
