= Blair Gullion =

American basketball player and coach

Biographical details
- Born: December 22, 1901; Elwood, Indiana, U.S.
- Died: January 30, 1959 (aged 57); Clayton, Missouri, U.S.

Playing career
- 1921–1924: Purdue
- Position: Center

Coaching career (HC unless noted)
- 1927–1935: Earlham
- 1935–1938: Tennessee
- 1938–1942: Cornell
- 1946–1947: Connecticut
- 1947–1952: Washington University
- 1953–1959: Washington University

Head coaching record
- Overall: 313–211

Accomplishments and honors

Awards
- First-team All-Big Ten (1922)

Burton Blair Gullion (December 22, 1901 – January 30, 1959) was an American college basketball player and coach. He was head coach for Earlham College, the University of Tennessee, Cornell University, the University of Connecticut and Washington University in St. Louis. He was also a president of the National Association of Basketball Coaches (NABC).

Guillion played college basketball for Purdue from 1921 to 1924, leading the Big Ten Conference in scoring in 1922. Following his playing career, which included playing time for the briefly named Fort Wayne Caseys in the inaugural season of the American Basketball League, Gullion coached at the high school level and in 1927 was named head coach for Earlham College. He coached there for eight seasons and led the program to its only undefeated season in school history, going 15–0 in the 1932–33 campaign.

Following his time at Earlham, Gullion moved to Tennessee, where he went 47–19 over three seasons, and then Cornell, where he went 48–43 over four seasons. Gullion's coaching career was put on hold during World War II, as he served as a major in the Air Force, primarily overseeing physical education programs.

After the war, Gullion was named head coach at Connecticut in 1946 and was named president of the NABC. He left to become head coach and athletic director for Washington University. He led the basketball program for eleven seasons, compiling a 109–87 record from 1947 to 1959. Gullion died during his tenure as Bears' coach and AD on January 30, 1959, of a heart attack.

A respected basketball mind throughout his career, Gullion authored three books on the game and in 1971 was posthumously inducted to the Indiana Basketball Hall of Fame.

== Head coaching record ==
Record table
| Season | Team | Overall | Conference | Standing | Postseason |
|---|---|---|---|---|---|
Tennessee Volunteers (SEC) (1935–1938)
| 1935–36 | Tennessee | 15–6 | 8–4 | 1st | |
| 1936–37 | Tennessee | 17–5 | 7–1 | 5th | |
| 1937–38 | Tennessee | 15–8 | 7–4 | 8th | |
| Tennessee: | | 47–19 (.712) | 22–9 (.710) | | |
Connecticut Huskies (New England Conference) (1945–1946)
| 1945–46 | Connecticut | 11–6 | 4–2 | 2nd | |
Connecticut Huskies (Yankee Conference) (1946–1947)
| 1946–47 | Connecticut | 4–2^{[Note A]} | 1–1^{[Note A]} | ^{[Note A]} | |
| Connecticut: | | 15–8 (.652) | 5–3 (.500) | | |
| Total: | | 15–8 (.652) | | | |
National champion Postseason invitational champion Conference regular season champion Conference regular season and conference tournament champion Division regular season champion Division regular season and conference tournament champion Conference tournament champion

== Notes ==
^A. After Gullion left Connecticut in mid-season in 1946–47, assistant coach Hugh Greer became head coach and led the Huskies. Connecticut finished the season with an overall record of 16–2 and a final record of 6–1 and second-place finish in the Yankee Conference.

== See also ==
- List of UConn Huskies men's basketball seasons
