= John Heldman Jr. =

American college athletics coach and administrator (1905–1970)

Biographical details
- Born: July 24, 1905; Petersburg, Ohio, U.S.
- Died: December 21, 1970 (aged 65); Louisville, Kentucky, U.S.
- Education: Oberlin College (BA, 1928); Teachers College, Columbia University (MA, 1932); Indiana University Bloomington (Ph.D., 1953)

Coaching career (HC unless noted)

Men's basketball
- 1927–1928: Oberlin (freshmen)
- 1928–1931: Sandusky HS
- 1931–1936: Connecticut
- 1936–1940: Louisville (freshmen)
- 1940–1942: Louisville

Baseball
- 1928: Oberlin (freshmen)
- 1932–1935: Connecticut (freshmen)
- 1937–1966: Louisville

Football
- 1927: Oberlin (freshmen)
- 1931–1935: Connecticut (freshmen)
- 1936–1940: Louisville (freshmen)

Administrative career (AD unless noted)
- 1943–1952: Louisville

Head coaching record
- Overall: 356–163–2 (.685) (baseball); 28–66 (.298) (basketball)

John Heldman Jr. (July 24, 1905 – December 21, 1970) was an American college athletics coach and administrator who was the head coach of the UConn Huskies men's basketball team (1931–1936) and the head coach of the University of Louisville's baseball (1937–1966) and men's basketball teams (1940–1942).

== Early life ==
Heldman was born on July 24, 1905, in Petersburg, Mahoning County, Ohio, to John and Sadye (Bishop) Heldman. He was raised in Struthers, Ohio, and was a member of the football, basketball, baseball, and track teams at Struthers High School. He scored a record 79 points in 80 minutes of play during the 1922 Northeast Ohio Basketball Tournament and was the leading scorer in the following year's tournament as well. He played varsity baseball, basketball, and football at Oberlin College.

Heldman received his Bachelor of Arts from Oberlin in 1928 and his Master's degree from Teachers College, Columbia University in 1931. On June 18, 1932, he married Ruth E. Gall. They had two daughters – Peggy and Judy.

== Career ==
=== Early career ===
Heldman began his coaching career in 1927 as the freshman football, basketball, and baseball coach at Oberlin. In 1928, he became the director of physical education for the Sandusky, Ohio school district and head basketball coach at Sandusky High School.

=== UConn ===
In 1931, Heldman joined the faculty at the Connecticut Agricultural College as a physical education instructor, varsity men's basketball coach, and freshman football and baseball coach. Harrison Fitch, the program's first Black player, joined the team in the 1932–33 season. Heldman made the controversial decision to bench Fitch in a game against the United States Coast Guard Academy in 1934 after Coast Guard refused to play if Fitch was on the floor. In 1934, the student senate conducted a poll regarding the athletic department. Students voted 406 to 78 in favor of reorganizing the department and 169 to 7 in favor of removing Heidman as basketball coach. Heldman resigned after the first game of the 1935–36 season so that he could pursue his Doctor of Philosophy studies at Indiana University Bloomington. He finished with a 19–42 overall record.

=== Louisville ===
In 1936, Heldman became the director of physical education and freshman football and basketball coach at the University of Louisville. He organized the university's Health, Physical Education, and Recreation program in 1937.

Heldman was head coach of Louisville's baseball team from 1937 to 1966. His teams captured the Southern Intercollegiate Athletic Association baseball title in 1938 and 1939 and went undefeated in 1951. He compiled a record of 356–163–2 and was inducted into the Helms Athletic Foundation College Baseball Hall of Fame in 1966.

Heldman was head coach of the Louisville Cardinals men's basketball team from 1940 to 1942 and compiled a 9–24 record.

In 1943, Heldman became Louisville's athletic director after Laurie Apitz resigned due to poor health. He was replaced by Roy Mundorff in 1952, but continued to serve as director of the Health, Physical Education, and Recreation department until his death on December 21, 1970.
