= Fred Shabel =

American basketball player, coach, and sports executive (1932–2023)

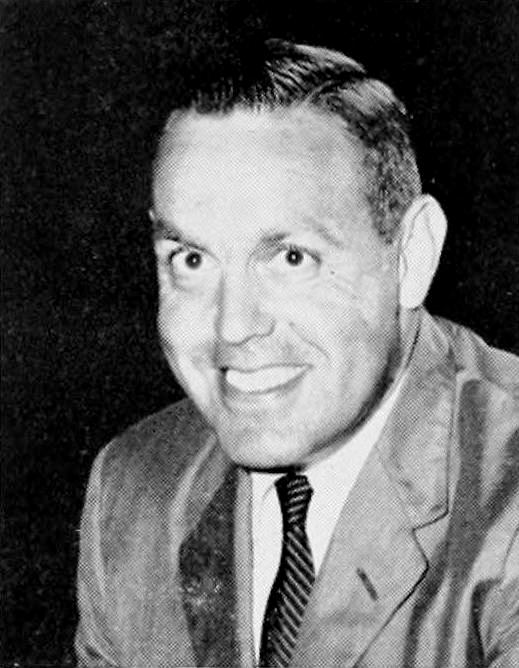
- Shabel with Duke, 1961–62

Personal information
- Born: March 20, 1932 New York City, New York, U.S.
- Died: February 26, 2023 (aged 90) Clearwater, Florida, U.S.
- Listed height: 6 ft 0 in (1.83 m)
- Listed weight: 190 lb (86 kg)

Career information
- High school: Union Hill (Union City, New Jersey)
- College: Duke (1951–1954)
- Position: Guard
- Number: 34
- Coaching career: 1957–1967

Career history

Coaching
- 1957–1963: Duke (assistant)
- 1963–1967: Connecticut

Career coaching record
- Connecticut: 72–29 (.713)

Frederick A. Shabel (March 20, 1932 – February 26, 2023) was an American sports executive and college basketball player and coach. He was the Connecticut Huskies men's basketball head coach from 1963 through 1967.

== Early life ==
Frederick A. Shabel was born in Brooklyn, New York, or Richmond Hill, New York, on March 20, 1932. He moved to Union City, New Jersey, at a young age and attended Union Hill High School. He earned all-state honors playing on Union Hill's basketball team.

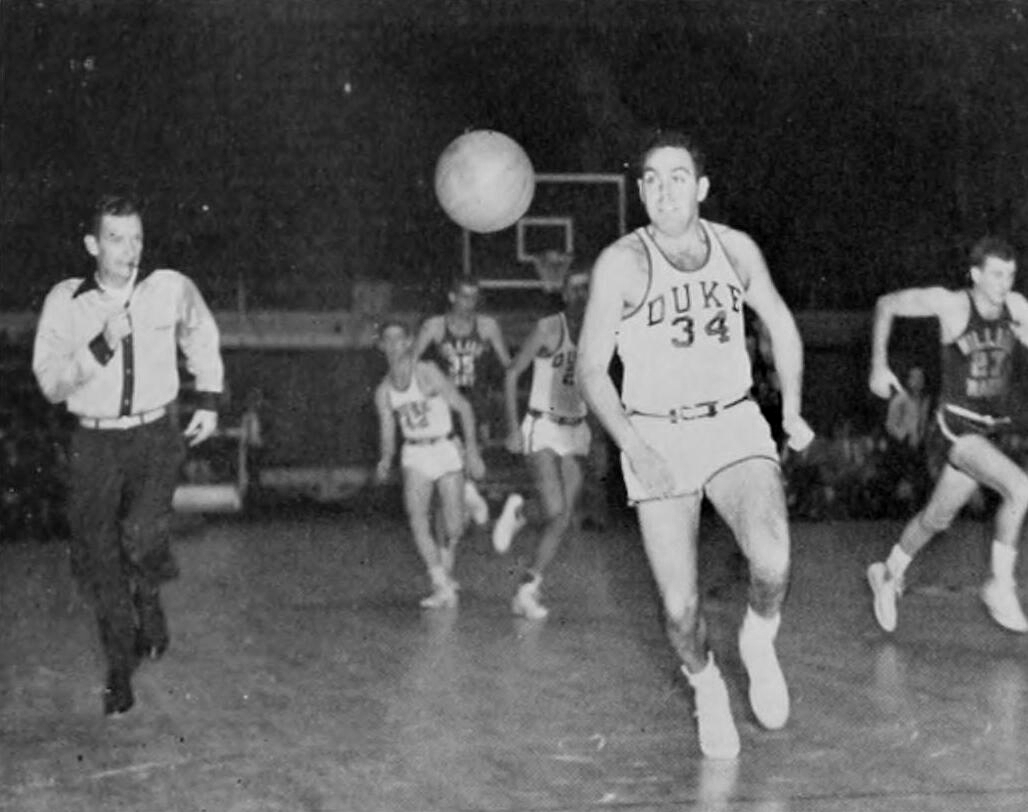
Shabel playing for Duke, 1953

Shabel matriculated to Duke University, where he played on the men's basketball team from 1951 to 1954. The Hartford Courant described him as the back-up man to Dick Groat.

Shabel then served in the U.S. Air Force from 1954 to 1956, and was a First Lieutenant at the time of his discharge. He served for the Ninth Air Force based out of Shaw Air Force Base in Sumter, South Carolina. He was a player-coach for the Shaw AFB basketball team which won its district and earned second place in the World Wide Air Force Championships.

== Coaching career ==
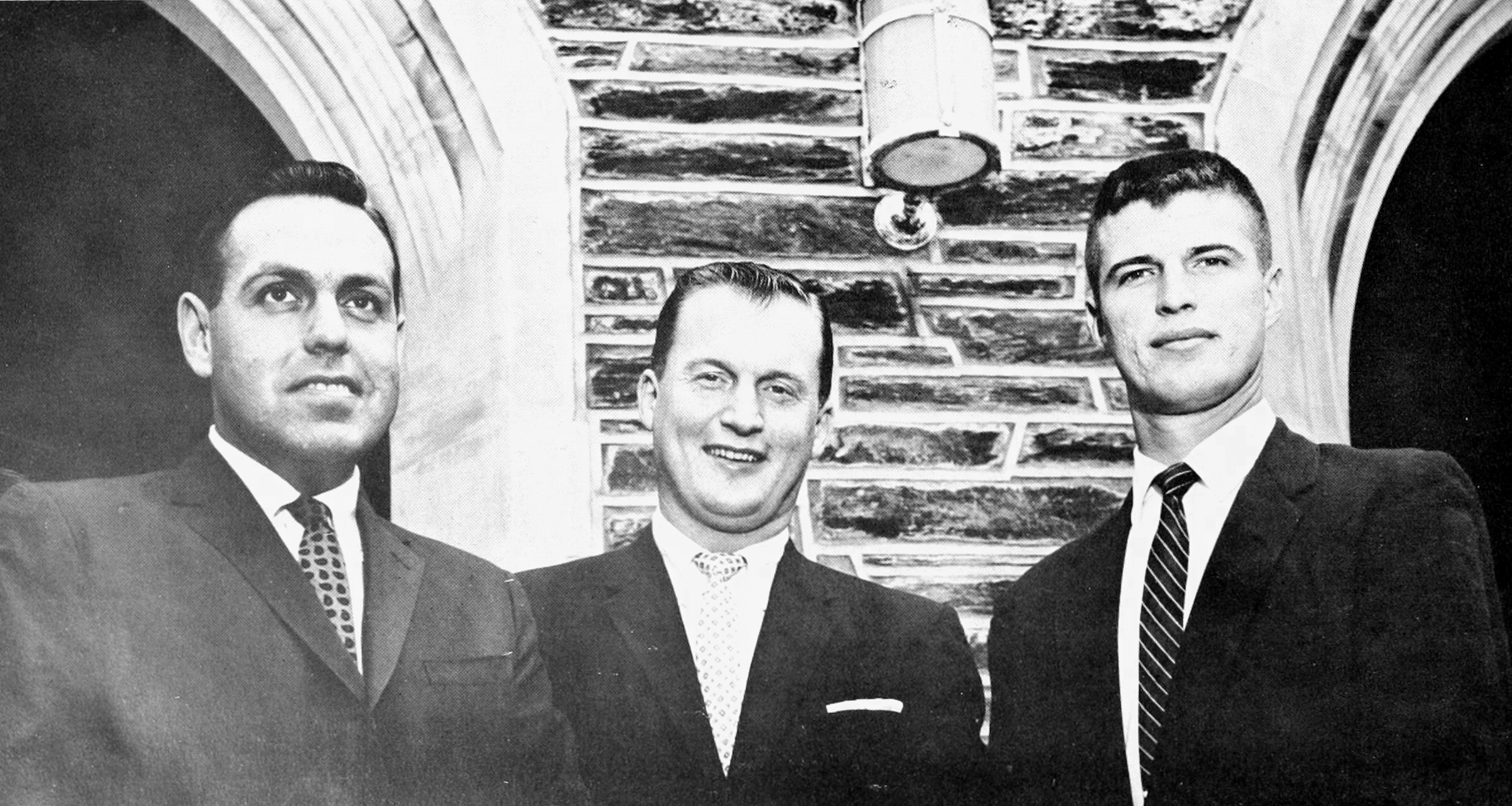
Shabel at Duke with head coach Vic Bubas and fellow assistant coach Bucky Waters, circa 1960

After his playing career, Shabel served as an assistant coach for Duke from 1957 to 1963.

While at Duke, Shabel received an offer to coach Rutgers and nearly accepted, but ultimately "got cold feet and withdrew". Shortly thereafter, the head coach position opened with the Connecticut Huskies when Hugh Greer died on January 14, 1963. Shabel says he talked over the decision with Duke head coach Vic Bubas, who told him, "You can win 17 games there and it's the Yankee Conference, not the ACC." On April 1, 1963, Shabel was publicly announced as UConn's new coach.

Across Shabel's four seasons at Connecticut, he held a 72–29 record for a 71.3% win percentage. He led Connecticut to four Yankee Conference regular season titles and three NCAA tournament berths. In the 1964–65 season, the Huskies went 23–2 in the regular season, tying the school record.

== Sports administration ==
After four seasons with the Huskies, Shabel decided to retire from coaching, saying in a 2003 interview, "The W's and L's were difficult to handle and I began to understand that I did not see myself with a sweat shirt and a whistle at age 50." In 1967, Shabel became the athletic director for the University of Pennsylvania, overseeing the Penn Quakers sports teams. In 1975, he left the athletics department and became vice president for operations at the university.

In 1980, Shabel left Penn to become an executive at Spectacor, a sports company which owns several professional teams and arenas in the Philadelphia area. He retired in 2020.

== Death ==
Shabel died in Clearwater, Florida, on February 26, 2023, at the age of 90.
