= George Wigton =

American basketball coach (1929–2022)

Biographical details
- Born: February 20, 1929; Oberlin, Ohio, U.S.
- Died: March 1, 2022 (aged 93); Auburn, Maine, U.S.

Playing career
- 1954–1955: Ohio State
- Position: Forward

Coaching career (HC unless noted)

Men's basketball
- 1961–1963: UConn (assistant)
- 1963: UConn (interim HC)
- 1963–1964: UConn (assistant)
- 1964–1965: Staples HS (CT)
- 1965–1982: Bates
- 1983–1986: Bates

Men's soccer
- 1965–1972: Bates

Men's tennis
- 1973–1982: Bates
- 1983–1989: Bates
- 1990–1996: Bates

Women's tennis
- 1981–1982: Bates
- 1985–1992: Bates

Men's squash
- 1986–1989: Bates
- 1990–1996: Bates

Women's squash
- 1986–1989: Bates

Head coaching record
- Overall: 186–279 (men's basketball); 171–77 (men's tennis); 92–98 (men's squash); 45–40–11 (men's soccer); 42–42 (women's tennis); 13–31 (women's squash)
- Tournaments: 0–1 (Men's basketball)

Accomplishments and honors

Championships
- 1x NESCA men's tennis champion (1988)

George Lindbergh Wigton (February 20, 1929 – March 1, 2022) was an American basketball coach who was the interim head basketball coach of the UConn Huskies men's basketball team in 1963 and head coach of the Bates Bobcats men's basketball team from 1965 to 1982.

== Early life ==
Wigton was born in Oberlin, Ohio, to Charles E. and Elizabeth (Lowry) Wigton on February 20, 1929. He was an all-Southwestern Conference player in basketball, football and track. After high school, he served in the United States Navy and helped lead Naval Station Norfolk to an All-Navy championship. On December 21, 1952, he married Eleanor Mahan. They had four children.

Wigton attended Ohio State University and played for the Ohio State Buckeyes men's basketball team. He was a member of the varsity squad during the 1954–55 season and scored 27 points in 28 games. He graduated in 1956 with a Bachelor of Science degree.

== Coaching ==
=== UConn ===
In 1956, Wigton joined the faculty at the University of Connecticut as an associate professor of physical education and athletic coach. In 1962, he became the lead assistant coach of the varsity men's basketball team and the head freshman football coach following the departure of Nick Rodis. He became acting men's basketball coach following Hugh Greer's unexpected death on January 14, 1963. He led the team to an 11–4 record and an appearance in the 1963 NCAA University Division basketball tournament. Wigton was considered for the head coaching job, but Duke assistant Fred Shabel was chosen instead. Wigton remained with the team as an assistant. He left the following year to become the head basketball and assistant football coach at Staples High School in Westport, Connecticut.

=== Bates ===
In 1965, Wigton became the men's basketball coach at Bates College. He was the school's longest-tenured basketball coach, compiling a 175–275 record from 1965 to 1986. He was also the men's tennis coach for 26 years, making him Bates' longest-tenured coach in that sport as well. He led the Bobcats to a New England Small College Athletic Conference men's tennis championship in 1988. Additionally, he coached men's soccer from 1965 to 1972, women's tennis for eight years, and was the varsity men's squash coach from the program's founding in 1986 until his retirement in 1996. He coached four All-Americans in three sports (Rob Thompson in soccer, Paul Gastonguay and Bud Schultz in tennis, and Herb Taylor in basketball).

== Later life ==
Wigton remained in Auburn, Maine following his retirement. In 2002, the George L. Wigton Scholar Fund was created in recognition of his tenure at Bates. Wigton died on March 1, 2022.
