= Hugh Greer =

American basketball player-coach (1904–1963)

Hugh S. Greer
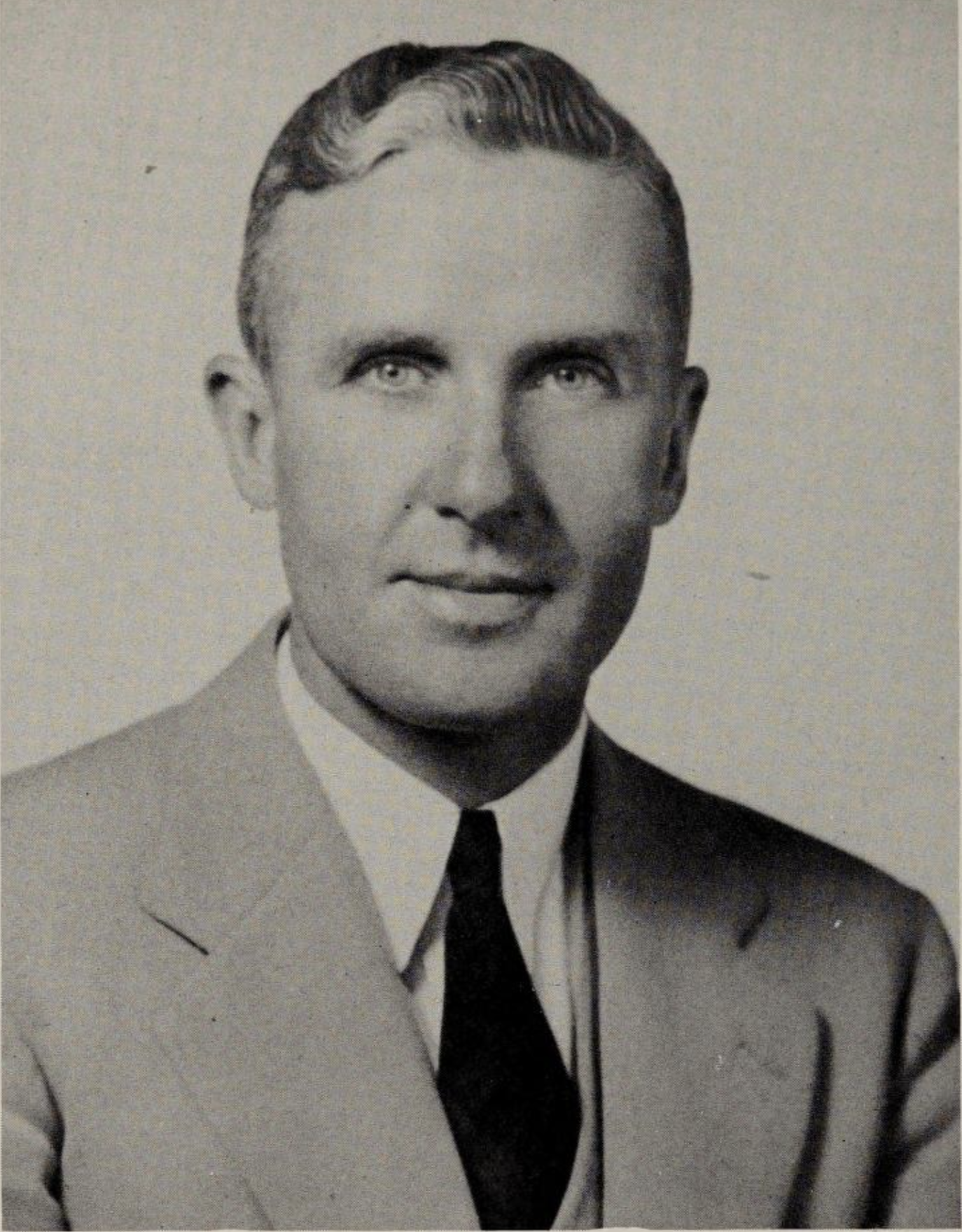
- Greer in 1946

Biographical details
- Born: August 5, 1904; Suffield, Connecticut, U.S.
- Died: January 14, 1963 (aged 58); Storrs, Connecticut, U.S.

Playing career
- 1926: UConn

Coaching career (HC unless noted)
- 1937–1946: Ellsworth Memorial HS
- 1946–1947: UConn (assistant)
- 1947–1963: UConn

Head coaching record
- Overall: 286–112 (.719)
- Tournaments: 1–8 (NCAA Division I); 0–1 (NIT)

Accomplishments and honors

Championships
- As player: New England Conference (1926); As head coach: 5 CIAC Class C-D state tournament (1939–1941, 1943, 1945); 12 Yankee Conference (1948–1949, 1951–1960)

Awards
- New England Basketball Hall of Fame (2003)

Hugh Scott Greer (August 5, 1904 – January 14, 1963) was an American men's college basketball coach. Known as the "Father of Connecticut Basketball," he was the head coach of the UConn Huskies men's basketball team from 1947 to 1963. He developed the program into a regional powerhouse, winning 12 Yankee Conference titles and making seven NCAA tournament appearances during his 17 seasons. Most notably, the Huskies won 10 consecutive conference championships from 1951 to 1960, which was the longest streak of any program in NCAA Division I history at the time and remains the fourth-longest streak as of 2025.

With 286 wins and a .719 winning percentage, Greer spent more than three decades as the all-time winningest coach in UConn men's basketball history until he was surpassed by Jim Calhoun in 1999.

== Biography ==
=== Early life and education ===
Born on August 5, 1904, in Suffield, Connecticut, Greer graduated from Suffield Academy before attending Connecticut Agricultural College (CAC), now the University of Connecticut. As a basketball player at CAC, Greer helped lead the team to a New England Conference championship in 1926.

=== High school coaching years ===
Greer began his coaching career with the Manchester High School boys' basketball team, followed by a four-year stint at Glastonbury High School.

In 1937, he was named head coach at Ellsworth Memorial High School in South Windsor, Connecticut, where he became the school's all-time winningest coach and led the team to five CIAC boys' basketball state tournament championships. He compiled an overall record of 186–16 between 1937 and 1946, which included a 67-game win streak — the longest on record for any New England team at the time.

=== University of Connecticut ===
Greer was hired by the University of Connecticut in 1946 as an assistant coach in the men's basketball program, coaching the freshman team. However, six games into the year, head coach Blair Gullion abruptly resigned to accept a position at Washington University, and the school named Greer head coach of the varsity team for the remainder of the 1946–47 season. The Huskies finished with a perfect 12–0 record under Greer, and the school selected him as the permanent head coach.

During his 17 seasons as head coach, Greer led Connecticut to its first Yankee Conference title in 1948, first NCAA tournament appearance in 1951, first NIT appearance in 1955 and first NCAA tournament win in 1956. With his 1953–54 team, he famously coached UConn to a 78–77 victory against undefeated Holy Cross, breaking the Crusaders' 47-game home winning streak. (That season, Holy Cross went on to win the 1954 NIT title.)

The Huskies were 10 games into the 1962–63 season when Greer unexpectedly died of a heart attack on January 14, 1963, at the age of 58. Assistant coach George Wigton finished out the year as interim head coach and led the Huskies to the 1963 NCAA tournament.

== Head coaching record ==
Record table
Season	Team	Overall	Conference	Standing	Postseason
Connecticut Huskies (Yankee Conference) (1946–1963)
1946–47	Connecticut	12–0^{[Note A]}	5–0^{[Note A]}	2nd	
1947–48	Connecticut	17–6	6–1	1st	
1948–49	Connecticut	19–6	7–1	1st	
1949–50	Connecticut	17–8	5–2	2nd	
1950–51	Connecticut	22–4	6–1	1st	NCAA First Round
1951–52	Connecticut	20–7	6–1	1st	
1952–53	Connecticut	17–4	5–1	1st	
1953–54	Connecticut	22–3	7–0	1st	NCAA First Round
1954–55	Connecticut	20–5	7–0	1st	NIT First Round
1955–56	Connecticut	17–11	6–1	1st	NCAA Sweet Sixteen
1956–57	Connecticut	17–8	8–0	1st	NCAA First Round
1957–58	Connecticut	17–10	9–1	1st	NCAA First Round
1958–59	Connecticut	17–7	8–2	1st	NCAA First Round
1959–60	Connecticut	17–9	8–2	1st	NCAA First Round
1960–61	Connecticut	11–13	6–4	3rd	
1961–62	Connecticut	16–8	7–3	2nd	
1962–63	Connecticut	7–3^{[Note B]}	4–0^{[Note B]}	1st^{[Note B]}	
Connecticut:		286–112 (.719)	110–22 (.833)		
Total:		286–112 (.719)			
National champion Postseason invitational champion Conference regular season champion Conference regular season and conference tournament champion Division regular season champion Division regular season and conference tournament champion Conference tournament champion

== Awards ==
- 1957: Connecticut Sports Writer’s Alliance Gold Key Award
- 1957: University of Connecticut Distinguished Alumni Award
- 1985: Connecticut High School Coaches Association Hall of Fame
- 2003: New England Basketball Hall of Fame

== See also ==
- List of UConn Huskies men's basketball seasons

== Notes ==
^A. When head coach Blair Gullion left Connecticut in mid-season in 1946, the Huskies had a record of 4–2 overall and 1–1 in the Yankee Conference. Greer moved from assistant coach to the head coach position and led the Huskies for the rest of the 1946–47 season. Connecticut finished the season with an overall record of 16–2 and a record of 6–1 and a second-place finish in the Yankee Conference.
^B. After Greer died in January 1963, assistant coach George Wigton filled in as interim head coach for the rest of the 1962–63 season. Connecticut finished the season with an overall record of 18–7, a record of 9–1 and a first-place finish in the Yankee Conference, and an appearance in the 1963 NCAA Tournament.
