= 1935–36 Connecticut State Huskies men's basketball team =

American college basketball season

1935–36 Connecticut State Huskies men's basketball
- Conference: New England Conference
- Record: 3–11 (0–3 NEC)
- Head coach: John J. Heldman, Jr. (5th year); J.O. Christian (1st year)
- Home arena: Hawley Armory

1935–36 New England Conference men's basketball standings
	Conf.				Overall
Team	W		L	PCT	W		L	PCT
New Hampshire	3	–	0	1.000	8	–	7	.533
Rhode Island	4	–	1	.800	13	–	5	.722
Northeastern	1	–	3	.250	3	–	9	.250
Connecticut	0	–	3	.000	3	–	11	.214
Maine	0	–	1	.000	0	–	1	.000

The 1935–36 Connecticut State Huskies men's basketball team represented Connecticut State College, now the University of Connecticut, in the 1935–36 collegiate men's basketball season. The Huskies completed the season with a 3–11 overall record. The Huskies were members of the New England Conference, where they ended the season with a 0–3 record. The Huskies played their home games at Hawley Armory in Storrs, Connecticut, and were led by fifth-year head coach John J. Heldman, Jr. and first-year head coach J.O. Christian.

== Schedule ==
Date time, TV	Rank^{#}	Opponent^{#}	Result	Record	Site (attendance) city, state
Regular Season
*		Alumni	L 45–52	0–1	
*		Clark	L 19–38	0–2	
*		Wesleyan	L 35–45	0–3	
*		Massachusetts	L 32–58	0–4	
*		Brown	L 35–65	0–5	
*		Boston University	W 31–27	1–5	
		New Hampshire	L 29–44	1–6 (0–1)	
		Rhode Island	L 32–75	1–7 (0–2)	
*		Trinity	W 37–29	2–7	
*		Arnold	L 33–35	2–8	
*		Trinity	L 27–35	2–9	
		Rhode Island	L 51–56	2–10 (0–3)	
*		Worcester Polytech	L 30–48	2–11	
*		Coast Guard	W 43–42	3–11	
*Non-conference game. ^{#}Rankings from AP Poll. (#) Tournament seedings in parentheses. All times are in Eastern Time.

Schedule Source:
