= Nick Rodis =

Biographical details
- Born: January 24, 1924; Nashua, New Hampshire, U.S.
- Died: October 7, 2011 (age 87); Newton, Massachusetts, U.S.
- Education: Harvard University (A.B.M. 1949); American International College (M.A.Ed 1951)

Playing career

Football
- 1946–1948: Harvard

Baseball
- 1946–1948: Harvard
- Positions: Guard (football); Outfielder (baseball)

Coaching career (HC unless noted)

Men's basketball
- 1948–49: Huntington School
- 1949–54: American International
- 1954–62: UConn (asst.)

Football
- 1949–53: American International (line)
- 1954–61: UConn (freshmen)

Administrative career (AD unless noted)
- 1967–84: Brandeis

Accomplishments and honors

Championships
- NCAA Division III Men's Soccer Championship (1976); NCAA Men's Division III Cross Country Championship (1983)

Nicholas Rodis (January 24, 1924 – October 7, 2011) was an American athlete, coach, and administrator.

== Early life ==
Rodis was born on January 24, 1924 Nashua, New Hampshire. He graduated from Nashua High School in 1941 and Lawrence Academy in 1942. During World War II he served in the United States Army Air Forces.

== Harvard ==
After his military service ended, Rodis enrolled at Harvard University, where he joined many fellow veterans on the Crimson football team. Rodis was a starting guard for the Crimson for three seasons, but also saw playing time at tackle and center. In 1948, Rodis was a member of the North squad in the Blue–Gray Football Classic. Rodis was also an outfielder on the Harvard Crimson baseball team.

== Coaching ==
In 1948, Rodis began his coaching career as the boys' basketball coach at the Huntington School. The following year he joined the staff of the American International College, where he was the line coach for the Yellow Jackets' football team and the head men's basketball coach. In 1954 he moved to the University of Connecticut, where he was the freshman football and basketball coach.

== U.S. State Department ==
In 1962, Rodis joined the United States Department of State as the special assistant for athletic programs in the Bureau of Educational and Cultural Affairs. Here he oversaw three programs - one which sent top American athletes on tours of foreign countries, a second that brought foreign coaches and athletes to study in the United States, and a third that sent American coaches to work overseas - that each had a budget of close to $1 million. Rodis was also tasked by United States Attorney General Robert F. Kennedy, a former teammate of his at Harvard, to work on resolving the dispute between the National Collegiate Athletic Association and the Amateur Athletic Union over control of amateur sports in the country. The involvement of the Kennedy administration and its chief mediator, General Douglas MacArthur, helped to broker a deal in time for the 1964 Summer Olympics.

== Brandeis ==
In 1967, Rodis became the director of athletics at Brandeis University. He was responsible for hiring a number of successful coaches, including Bob Brannum (basketball), Tom O'Connell (baseball), Mike Coven (men’s soccer), Denise Dallamora (women’s soccer), Bill Shipman (fencing), and Pete Varney (baseball) and under his leadership, Brandeis made 29 NCAA tournament appearances and won NCAA Division III national championships in men's soccer (1976) and men's cross country (1983). Rodis stepped down as athletic director in 1984 but remained with the school until 1997 as the special assistant to the president for athletic development. In this role he was instrumental in fundraising for the construction of the Gosman Sports and Convocation Center.

== Personal life ==
On July 3, 1949, Rodis married Eve Karafotis. They had three children and the family resided in Needham, Massachusetts. Rodis died on October 7, 2011, at Newton-Wellesley Hospital. He was 87 years old.
