= Yankee Conference =

Former collegiate sports conference in the eastern United States

- Association: NCAA
- Founded: 1946
- Folded: 1997
- Division: College Division (1946–1972); Division II (1973–1977); Division I (1978–1997)
- Subdivision: Division I-AA (1978–1997)
- Region: New England; after 1986, Mid-Atlantic states

The Yankee Conference was a collegiate sports conference in the eastern United States. From 1947 to 1976, it sponsored competition in many sports, but was a football-only league from mid-1976 until its dissolution in 1996. It is essentially the ancestor of today's CAA Football, the legally separate football league operated by the Coastal Athletic Association (CAA), and the continuation of the New England Conference, though all three leagues were founded under different charters and are considered separate conferences by the NCAA. Also, CAA Football does not recognize the New England Conference as one of its predecessors, though it does recognize the Yankee Conference as such. 2024 marked a return of The Yankee Conference when in August of 2024 it was announced that Merrimack College and Sacred Heart University would play for The Yankee Conference Championship presented by LEONA.

For the first half of its history, the Yankee Conference consisted of the flagship public universities of the six New England states. Conference expansion in the 1980s and 1990s added several colleges and universities from the Mid-Atlantic region.

== Formation ==
In 1945, Northeastern University, the only private school in the New England Conference, announced its departure. A committee formed by the remaining four members, land-grant colleges and universities representing Connecticut, Maine, New Hampshire and Rhode Island, recommended that they join with the other two New England land-grant institutions, Massachusetts State College (which had also been a founding member of the NEC in 1923, but left in the 1930s) and the University of Vermont, in a new athletics league. This led to the formation of the Yankee Conference in December 1946, with athletic competition beginning in the 1947–48 school year.

=== Charter members ===
For its first 24 years, the conference consisted of the six charter members, each of which was the flagship public university of its state:

- University of Connecticut
- University of Maine
- University of Massachusetts Amherst (new name adopted in 1947)
- University of New Hampshire
- University of Rhode Island (known as Rhode Island State College until 1951)
- University of Vermont

During this time, Yankee Conference football teams competed in the College Division of the NCAA, the lower of two tiers of varsity competition. The conference also sponsored several other sports, such as basketball and baseball. Conference bylaws required all members to field teams in all conference-sponsored sports.

=== 1970s: In and out in New England ===
In 1971, the conference announced its first expansion, the addition of Boston University and the College of the Holy Cross. Both are private institutions (nonsectarian and Roman Catholic, respectively), and fit within the conference's existing geographic footprint, giving it a presence in Massachusetts' largest (Boston) and second-largest (Worcester) cities.

Both had previously competed as independents, and had a long tradition of meeting Yankee Conference members in non-league games. Because their seasons were scheduled years in advance, neither BU nor HC were able to begin league play in football immediately. Though it officially joined the conference in 1971, Boston University did not start competing for the football championship until 1973; Holy Cross never did.

Holy Cross had made another decision in the early 1970s that profoundly affected its athletics teams: the formerly all-male college began admitting women. Holy Cross already had by far the smallest enrollment in the conference, and administrators reached the conclusion that its shrinking male population would not be able to field competitive teams in all Yankee Conference sports. Accordingly, Holy Cross announced in November 1972 that it would quit the conference immediately.

The conference rule that all members must compete in all sports was tested again in 1974, when Vermont announced it would drop its football program at the end of that season. In 1975, the conference allowed its members to choose conference participation on a sport-by-sport basis. Later in the year, however, it opted to drop sponsorship of all sports except football at the conclusion of the 1975–76 season, effectively ending Vermont's association with the conference.

The 1970s also brought a change in how the NCAA classified football programs. In 1973, the old College Division was replaced by NCAA Division II, for "minor" programs that offer athletic scholarships, and NCAA Division III, for those without scholarships. The Yankee Conference programs were all placed in Division II. In 1978, the NCAA introduced Division I-AA, a subdivision that allowed universities competing in Division I in other sports to field football teams in that division without having to match up with the major football powers. From that point, all Yankee Conference members have been members of Division I-AA, later renamed the Football Championship Subdivision.

=== 1980s–90s: Expansion in the South ===
Through the late 1970s and early 1980s, the football-only Yankee Conference included six members: Boston University, UConn, Maine, UMass, UNH and URI. Starting in the mid-1980s, the conference began to admit members from outside New England, forming a second cluster of universities in the Mid-Atlantic region:

- University of Delaware in 1986 (in Delaware)
- University of Richmond in 1986 (in Virginia)
- Villanova University in 1988 (in Pennsylvania)
- James Madison University in 1993 (in Virginia)
- College of William & Mary in 1993 (in Virginia)

Also in 1993, Northeastern University in Boston joined the Yankee Conference.

Following the 1993 additions, the Yankee Conference had 12 members, and split into two six-team divisions, a "New England Division" consisting of the five remaining charter members plus Boston University, and a "Mid-Atlantic Division" consisting of the colleges that joined the conference in the 1980s and 1990s. Northeastern competed in the Mid-Atlantic despite being geographically located in New England.

=== 1996: Merger with A-10 ===
The 12-member, two-division arrangement continued until 1996, when the NCAA adopted rules limiting the influence of single-sport conferences over policy. Facing extinction, the conference merged with the Atlantic 10 Conference (A-10), which did not previously sponsor football, on November 13, 1996. UMass and URI were already members of the A-10 in other sports; the other 10 Yankee members became associate members in football only. For the 1997 season, the A-10 football league had the exact same members and division structure as the 1996 Yankee Conference.

After membership changes in the Colonial Athletic Association (now the Coastal Athletic Association) over the following 10 years, management of the A-10 football conference, which continued to include most of the former Yankee Conference teams, passed to the CAA in 2007. At that time, the separate entity of CAA Football was established.

== Member institutions ==
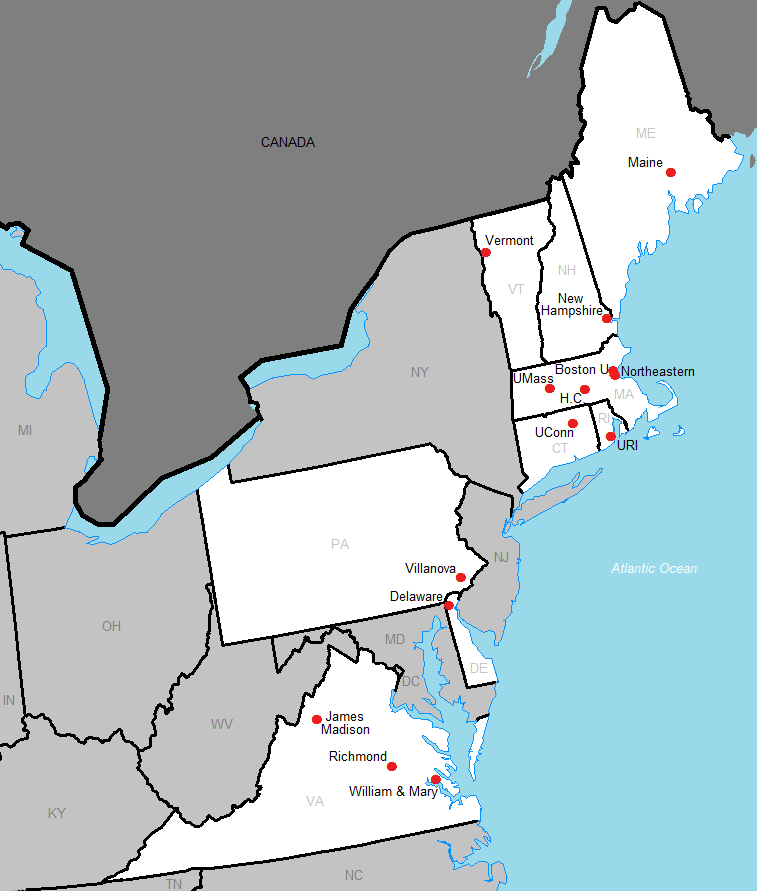
The all-time members of the Yankee Conference.

Institution	Location	Founded	Type	Joined	Nickname	Colors
Boston University	Boston, MA	1839	Private	1971†	Terriers	Scarlet & white
University of Connecticut	Storrs, CT	1881	Public	1946	Huskies	Navy Blue, white, & grey
University of Delaware	Newark, DE	1743	Private and Public	1986	Fightin' Blue Hens	Blue & yellow-gold
College of the Holy Cross	Worcester, MA	1843	Private	1971‡	Crusaders	Purple & white
James Madison University	Harrisonburg, VA	1908	Public	1993	Dukes	Purple & gold
University of Maine	Orono, ME	1865	Public	1946	Black Bears	Dark blue, light blue & white
University of Massachusetts Amherst	Amherst, MA	1863	Public	1946	Aggies/Redmen/Minutemen	UMass Maroon & white
University of New Hampshire	Durham, NH	1866	Public	1946	Wildcats	UNH Blue & white
Northeastern University	Boston, MA	1898	Private	1993	Huskies	Black & red
University of Rhode Island	Kingston, RI	1892	Public	1946	Rams	Keaney blue, white & navy blue
University of Richmond	Richmond, VA	1830	Private	1986	Spiders	UR Blue & UR Red
University of Vermont	Burlington, VT	1791	Public	1946‡	Catamounts	Green & gold
Villanova University	Villanova, PA	1842	Private	1988	Wildcats	Blue & white
The College of William & Mary	Williamsburg, VA	1693	Public	1993	Tribe	Green & gold

† Boston University joined the conference in 1971, but did not compete for the football championship until 1973.
‡ Holy Cross and Vermont ended their Yankee Conference affiliation in 1972 and 1976, respectively. Holy Cross never competed in the football championship, and Vermont ended its football program after 1974. All other conference members remained until 1996, when the league was absorbed by the Atlantic 10.

== Membership timeline ==
Full members (all-sports) Full members (non-football) Assoc. members (football only)

== Overtime rule ==
The Yankee Conference was the first college football conference to implement college football's current overtime rules. The overtime rules known as the "Kansas Playoff" or "Kansas Plan", where each team is given a possession at the 25 yard line, was used by the Yankee Conference to determine the end to tie games well before it was adopted by the rest of the NCAA in 1996.

== Conference champions ==
=== Football ===
Year	Champion
1947	New Hampshire
1948	New Hampshire
1949	Connecticut, Maine
1950	New Hampshire
1951	Maine
1952	Connecticut, Maine, New Hampshire
1953	New Hampshire, Rhode Island
1954	New Hampshire
1955	Rhode Island
1956	Connecticut
1957	Connecticut, Rhode Island
1958	Connecticut
1959	Connecticut
1960	Connecticut, Massachusetts
1961	Maine
1962	New Hampshire
1963	Massachusetts
1964	Massachusetts
1965	Maine
1966	Massachusetts
1967	Massachusetts
1968	Connecticut, New Hampshire
1969	Massachusetts
1970	Connecticut
1971	Connecticut, Massachusetts
1972	Massachusetts
1973	Connecticut
1974	Maine, Massachusetts
1975	New Hampshire
1976	New Hampshire
1977	Massachusetts
1978	Massachusetts
1979	Massachusetts
1980	Boston University
1981	Rhode Island, Massachusetts
1982	Boston U., Connecticut, Maine, Massachusetts
1983	Boston U., Connecticut
1984	Boston U., Rhode Island
1985	Rhode Island
1986	Connecticut, Delaware, Massachusetts
1987	Maine, Richmond
1988	Delaware, Massachusetts
1989	Connecticut, Maine, Villanova
1990	Massachusetts
1991	Delaware, New Hampshire, Villanova
1992	Delaware
1993	Boston U.
1994	New Hampshire
1995	Delaware
1996	William & Mary

=== Men's basketball ===
Year	Regular season champion
1947–48	Connecticut
1948–49	Connecticut
1949–50	Rhode Island
1950–51	Connecticut
1951–52	Connecticut
1952–53	Connecticut
1953–54	Connecticut
1954–55	Connecticut
1955–56	Connecticut
1956–57	Connecticut
1957–58	Connecticut
1958–59	Connecticut
1959–60	Connecticut
1960–61	Rhode Island
1961–62	Massachusetts
1962–63	Connecticut
1963/64	Connecticut; Rhode Island
1964/65	Connecticut
1965–66	Connecticut; Rhode Island
1966–67	Connecticut
1967–68	Massachusetts; Rhode Island
1968–69	Massachusetts
1969–70	Connecticut; Massachusetts
1970–71	Massachusetts
1971–72	Rhode Island
1972–73	Massachusetts
1973–74	Massachusetts
1974–75	Massachusetts
1975–76	Massachusetts

=== Men's soccer ===
- 1965: Vermont, Massachusetts, Connecticut
- 1966: Vermont
- 1967: Vermont
- 1968: Vermont, Rhode Island
- 1969: Vermont
- 1970: Massachusetts
- 1971: Rhode Island, Vermont
- 1972: Rhode Island
- 1973: Connecticut
- 1974: Connecticut
- 1975: Vermont
- 1976: Connecticut
- 1977: Rhode Island
- 1978: Connecticut
- 1979: New Hampshire

=== Baseball ===
Year	Champion
1949	Rhode Island
1950	Maine
1951	Connecticut
1952	Connecticut; UMass
1953	Connecticut
1954	New Hampshire
1955	Connecticut
1956	New Hampshire
1957	UMass
1958	Connecticut
1959	Connecticut
1960	Connecticut; Maine
1961	Connecticut
1962	Vermont
1963	Connecticut
1964	Maine
1965	Connecticut; Vermont
1966	Connecticut; Maine; UMass
1967	UMass
1968	Connecticut
1969	UMass
1970	Connecticut; Maine
1971	UMass
1972	Connecticut
1973	UMass
1974	Rhode Island
1975	Maine
1976	Connecticut
1977	Connecticut
1978	UMass; New Hampshire
1979	Maine; UMass

== Modern club football conference ==
The phrase "Yankee Conference" is alluded to in the 21st-century Yankee Collegiate Football Conference, which fields teams at the club football level.

Three of the schools in the original Yankee Conference, Boston University, Maine and Vermont, fielded teams in the modern Yankee Conference: since neither Boston nor Vermont currently has a varsity team, the club football team was the highest ranking football team representing the school in both cases.

The other two schools in the modern Yankee Conference were Clarkson University and Onondaga Community College. The conference also allowed an independent team, the Southwestern Connecticut Grizzlies, to play in the league and contest for the championship, even though it was not associated with any college or university. The modern conference last played in 2016.

== See also ==
- List of defunct college football conferences
- Hockey East
