= Hugh S. Greer Field House =

Multi-purpose arena in Storrs, Connecticut

Coordinates: 41.806948°N 72.256276°W

Hugh S. Greer Fieldhouse
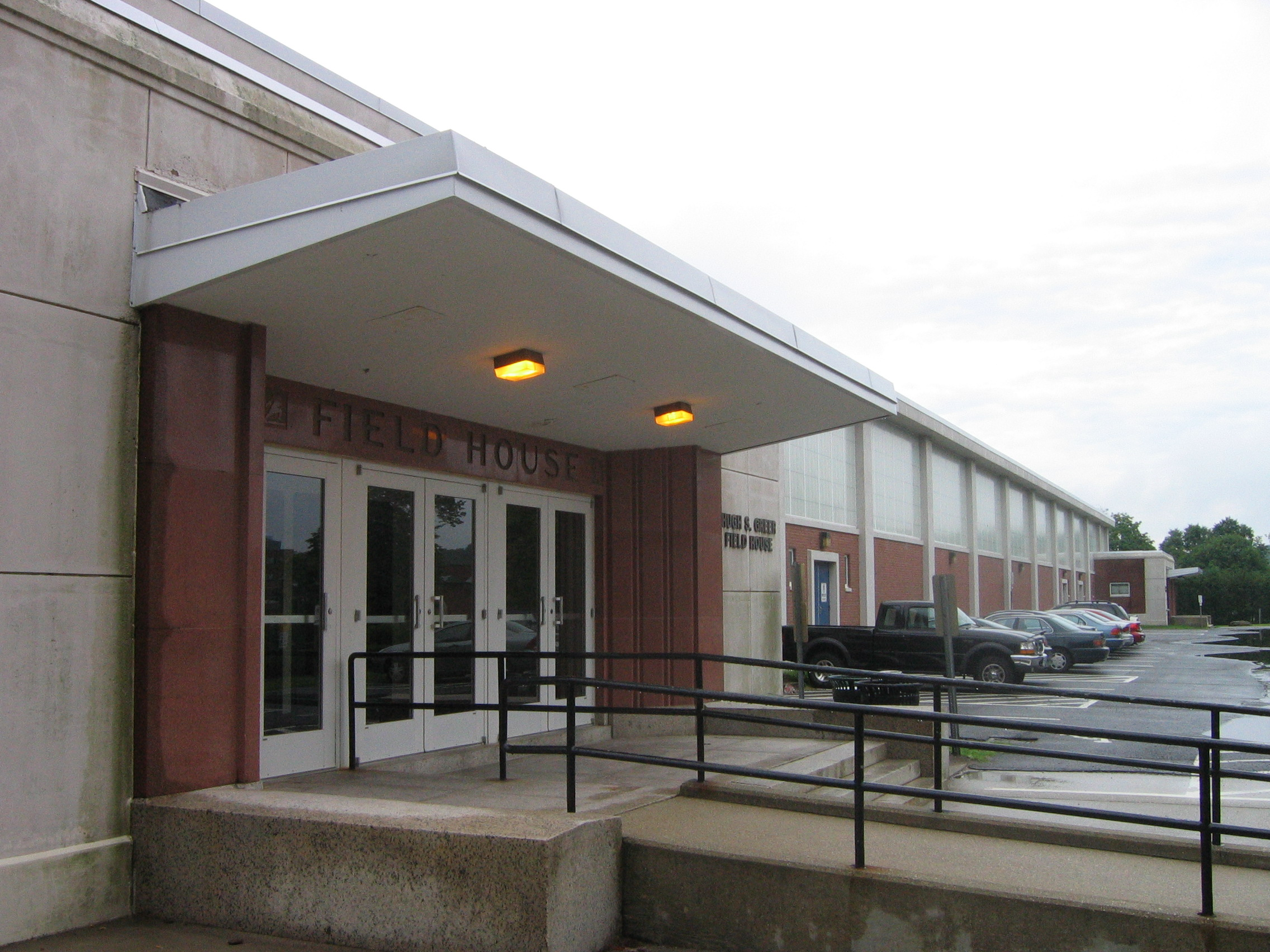
- Interactive map of Hugh S. Greer Fieldhouse
- Former names: University of Connecticut Field House; Storrs Field House
- Location: Hillside Rd; Storrs, CT 06269
- Owner: State of Connecticut
- Operator: University of Connecticut
- Capacity: 4,604
- Surface: Martin ISS 2000 (track)

Construction
- Opened: December 1, 1954

Tenant
- UConn Huskies (Indoor Track)

Hugh S. Greer Field House, formerly the University of Connecticut Field House, is a 4,604-seat multi-purpose arena in Storrs, Connecticut. It opened December 1, 1954 with a win against then-archrival URI. It was home to the University of Connecticut Huskies men's and women's basketball teams until January 27, 1990, when the Harry A. Gampel Pavilion opened. The arena is named after former Husky basketball player, coach and athletic director, Hugh Greer. It was remodeled in 1996-97 following the departure of the basketball teams to become a full-time indoor track facility.
