= Curry Hicks Cage =

Athletic facility in Amherst, Massachusetts

Curry Hicks Physical Education Building
- Curry Hicks Cage
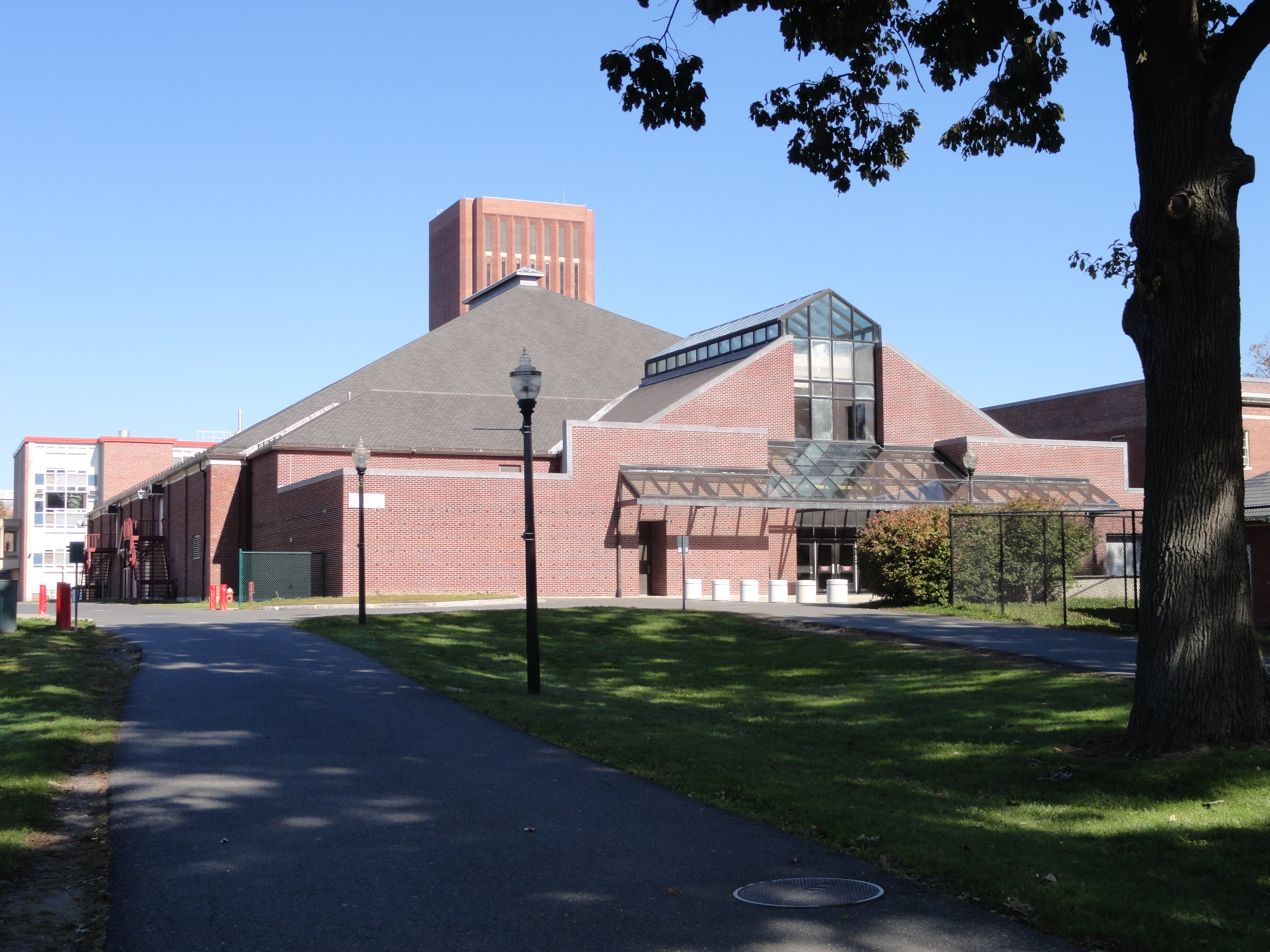
- The Curry Hicks Cage in 2011
- Interactive map of Curry Hicks Physical Education Building
- Location: Amherst, Massachusetts, United States
- Coordinates: 42.387207°N 72.52831°W
- Owner: University of Massachusetts Amherst
- Capacity: 4,000
- Surface: Hardwood (basketball); Mondo (track) (2025–Present)

Construction
- Opened: 1931
- Renovated: 1985, 2025
- Cost: $300,000
- Architect: Clinton Goodwin

Tenants
- UMass Minutemen basketball (1931–1993); UMass Minutemen track & field (1931–Present)

The Curry Hicks Physical Education Building, better known as the Curry Hicks Cage, is an athletic facility on the campus of the University of Massachusetts Amherst in Amherst. It was built in 1931 as the Physical Education Building by alumnus Clinton Goodwin. It was rededicated in 1941 and named in honor of Curry Hicks, who had been the athletic director at the school since 1911. With a capacity of 4,000, the venue served as the site of indoor athletic contests including men's basketball from its opening until January 1993 when it was replaced by the more modern and much larger Mullins Center. While the basketball team played at the Cage, it was known as one of the loudest buildings in the Northeast.

It was the site of the 1992 Atlantic 10 Conference men's basketball tournament championship game, when UMass defeated West Virginia, 97-91.

One of the most memorable events in The Cage's history may be the Temple/UMass men's basketball game on February 16, 1992. UMass had never beaten Temple in 21 attempts, but the rivalry had intensified greatly in recent contests. Much of the crowd stormed the court after the final buzzer, as UMass won 67-52.

During its final years as the Minutemen's basketball home, home games came to be marketed as "Rage in the Cage". Perhaps appropriately, the final Minutemen home game before the opening of the Mullins Center was against Southwestern Louisiana (now Louisiana)—the "Ragin' Cajuns". However, the Minutemen would play a one-off home game in the Cage in 2010 against Holy Cross.

The building is still very much in use today, containing a pool, an indoor track, offices, and the occasional symphony performance. The building's name is memorialized by Curry Hicks Sage, a popular twitter account devoted to chronicling UMass Minutemen basketball.

In 2025, renovations were started to convert the main part of the building into a track & field facility which would include removing the bleachers, court, and scoreboard to replace them with track surface, jump runways, and a throws area.
