= American International College =

Private college in Springfield, Massachusetts, US

- Motto: Post Tenebras Lux
- Motto in English: "Light after Darkness"
- Type: Private university
- Established: July 18, 1885; 141 years ago
- Academic affiliations: Cooperating Colleges of Greater Springfield
- President: Nicolle Cestero
- Undergraduates: 2,142
- Location: Springfield, Massachusetts, U.S. 42.1126°N 72.5578°W
- Campus: Urban, 58 acres (23 ha)
- Colors: Black and yellow
- Nickname: Yellow Jackets
- Website: www.aic.edu

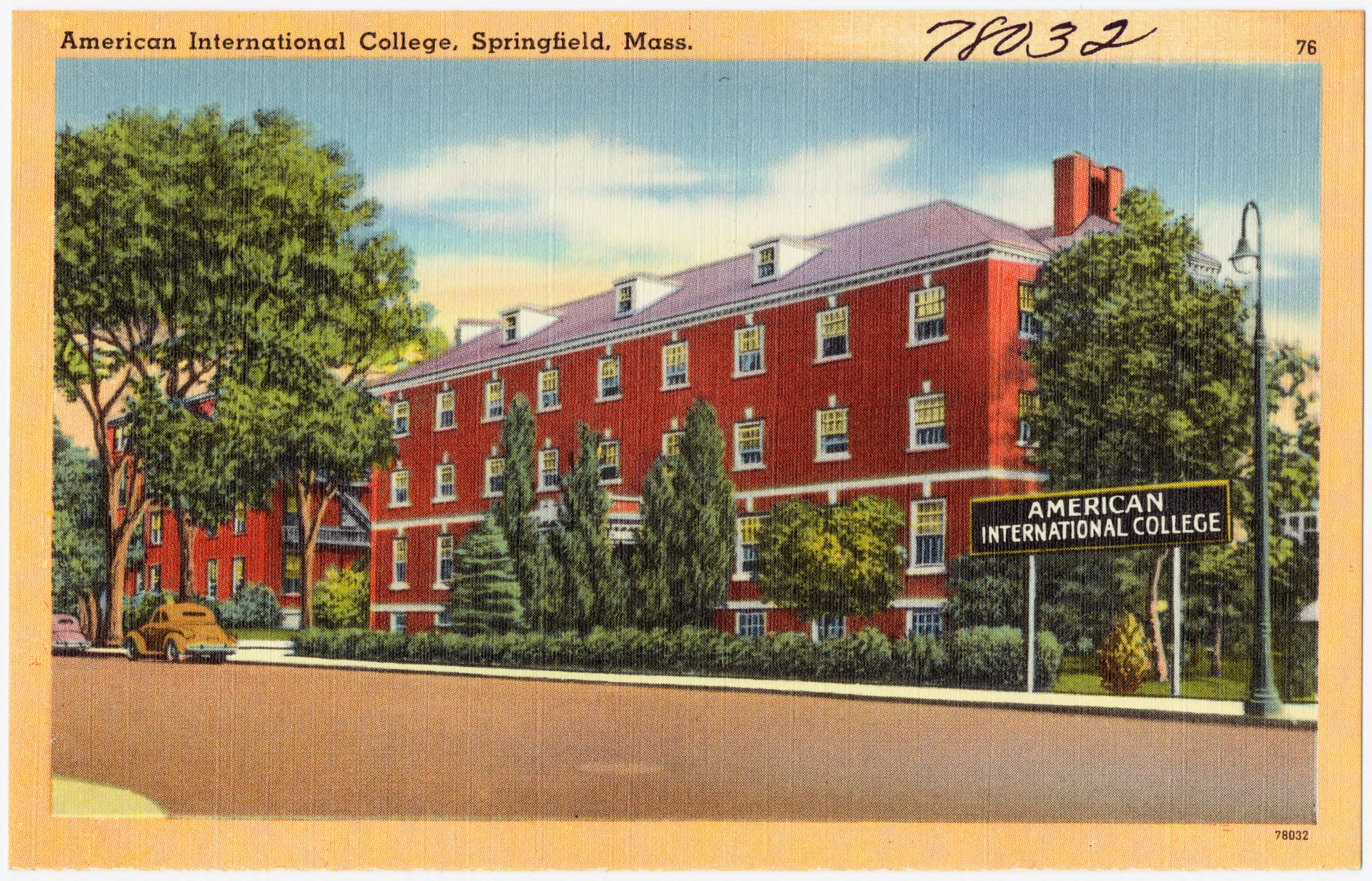
Historical postcard depicting Daughters of the American Revolution Hall located on the main campus

American International College (AIC) is a private university in Springfield, Massachusetts.

== History ==
The institution now named American International College was established as the French Protestant College in Lowell on July 18, 1885, under the auspices of the Congregationalist Church. Its founder was the Rev. Calvin E. Amaron, a French-Canadian pastor of Lowell's French Protestant Church, who sought to create an institution of higher learning that would provide the local French Canadian minority with access to higher education. It opened on October 27, 1885, and enrolled 21 students in its first year.

After two years of struggle in Lowell, a group in Springfield offered the school an acre of land, new funding, and co-enrollment with the School for Christian Workers (predecessor of today's Springfield College) if it would relocate to the city. The school purchased eight acres of land and moved into a former building of Springfield Hospital in 1888. Initially male-only, it enrolled women starting in 1892, making it the first coeducational college in Western Massachusetts.

The school was renamed the French-American College in 1894, the same year it produced its first graduate, Samuel E. Lord of Lowell. A student newspaper, Le Citoyen, was founded. The school was renamed again, this time to American International College, in 1905, its enrollment having extended beyond French Canadians to other immigrant communities.

== Academics ==
The university offers undergraduate and graduate programs, including master's and doctoral degrees and certificates of advanced graduate study (CAGS). There are three schools which focus on their respective academic areas:

- School of Business, Arts, and Sciences: Bachelor's and master's degrees
- School of Health Sciences: Bachelor's, master's, and doctoral degrees
- School of Education: Master's and doctoral degrees

Undergraduate students choose from 37 majors as they earn a Bachelor of Arts (B.A.), Bachelor of Science (B.S.), Bachelor of Science in Nursing (B.S.N.) or Bachelor of Science in Business Administration (B.S.B.A). Certificates and other non-degree programs are also offered.

== Athletics ==
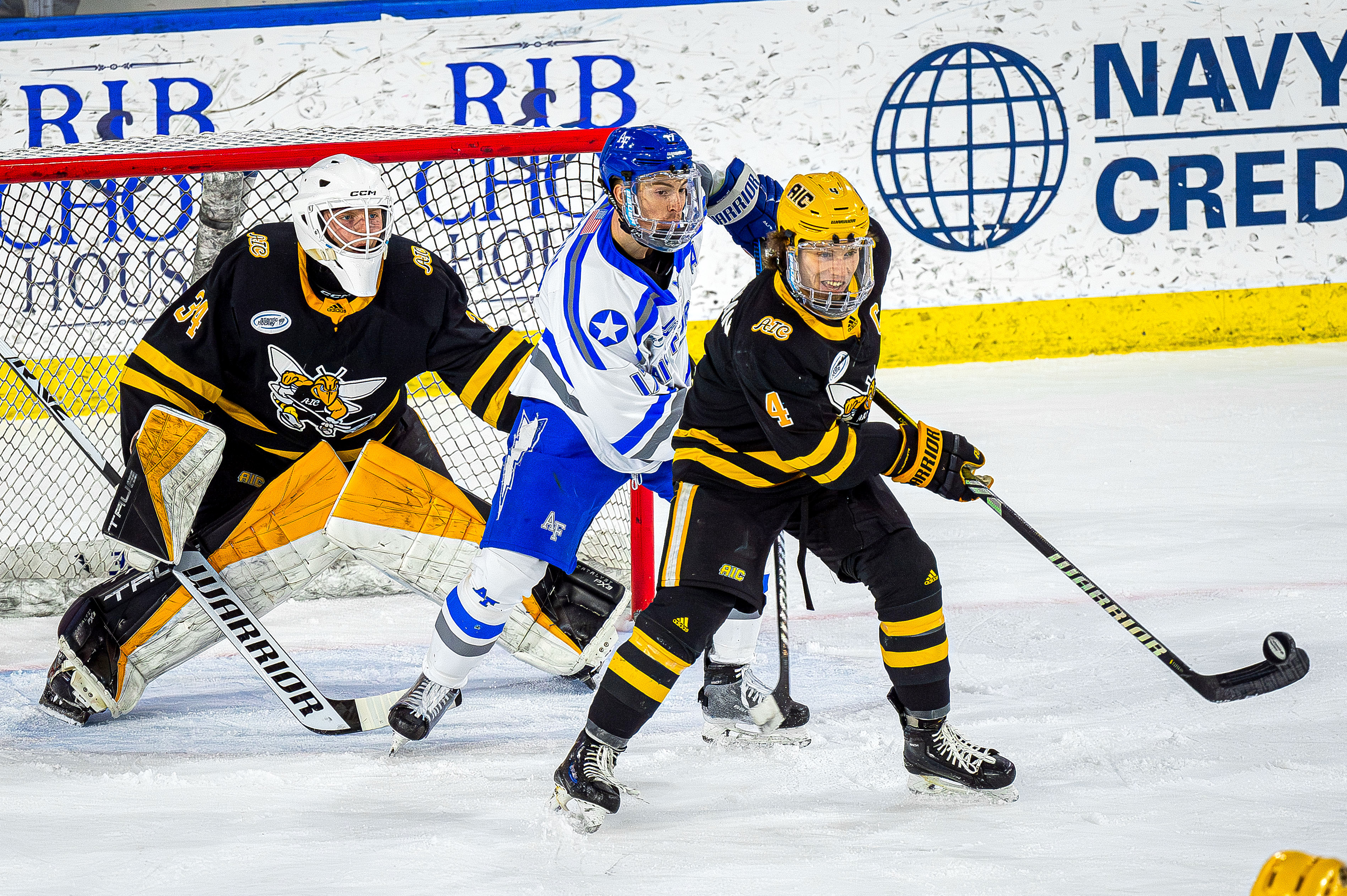
A Yellow Jackets men's ice hockey game against Air Force in 2024

The school competes in NCAA Division II, and is a member of the Northeast-10 Conference for all but three sports. Additionally, the institution's wrestling program, which is the only NCAA DII program in New England, competes as an independent.

The school's hockey team was formerly a member of NCAA Division I beginning in 1998. In 2016, after struggling for over a decade, AIC hired Eric Lang as their head coach and saw almost immediate success. The 2018–19 season was a historic one for the college as AIC won its first-ever conference championship and, as a result, qualified for its first ever NCAA Championship. In the first round of the tournament the Yellow Jackets were faced up against one-seed St. Cloud State and pulled off a major upset, winning 2-1. They were eliminated from the tournament by Denver in the next round by a score of 3-0. AIC qualified for the NCAA tournament again in 2021 and 2022. On November 12, 2024, AIC announced that it would move its hockey team back down to NCAA Division II due to a larger budgetary initiative called "Pathway to Progress". The Yellow Jackets will join the Northeast-10 Conference starting in the 2025–2026 school year.

AIC also has a college rugby program that was founded in 2009 and began play in 2010. The rugby program is part of the school's athletic department, has varsity status, with rugby scholarships available for students. AIC's men's team plays Division 1A in the Liberty Conference, while the women's team is a member of the NIRA.

== Notable alumni ==
=== Politics ===
- Paul Babeu, Arizona sheriff
- Mark G. Mastroianni, United States District Judge of the United States District Court for the District of Massachusetts
- William D. Mullins, member of the Massachusetts House of Representatives
- Richard Neal, member of the United States House of Representatives
- Mike Gravel, former Alaska Senator
- Michael C. Polt, US diplomat and former Ambassador to Estonia, Serbia, and Serbia and Montenegro
- Dianne Wilkerson, former member of the Massachusetts Senate
- James Worth, state representative

=== Athletics ===
- Jim Calhoun, college basketball coach
- Asnage Castelly, Olympic wrestler
- Mario Elie, professional basketball player and coach
- Harrison Fitch, college basketball player
- Dave Forbes, professional hockey player
- Fran Healy, professional baseball player and sportscaster
- Bruce Laird, professional football player
- Tom Rychlec, professional football player
- Joe Scibelli, professional football player

=== Other ===
- Anne Grodzins Lipow, university librarian
