= List of UConn Huskies men's basketball seasons =

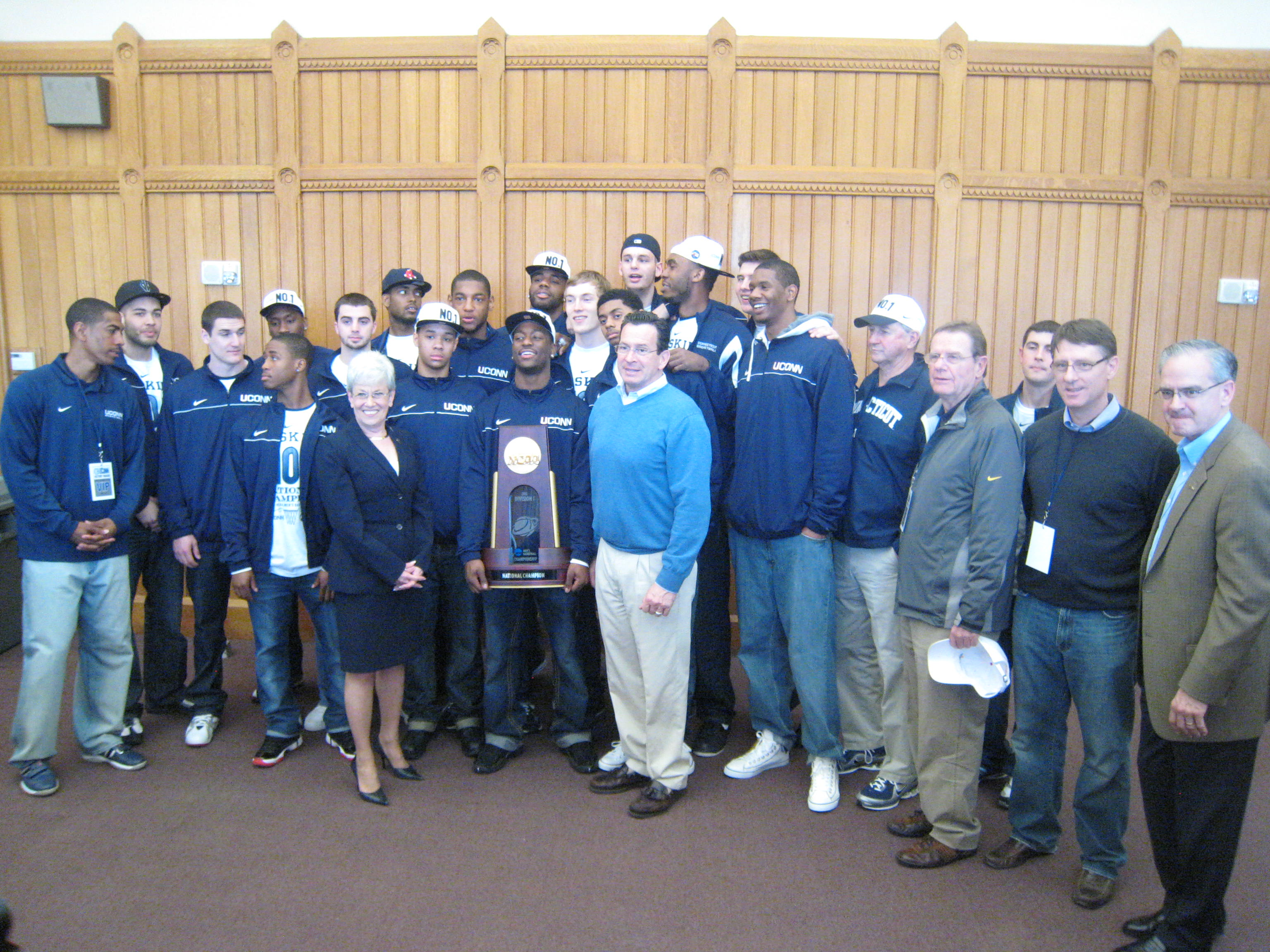
UConn players and coaches, joined by Connecticut Governor Dannel Malloy and Lieutenant Governor Nancy Wyman, pose with the 2011 championship trophy.

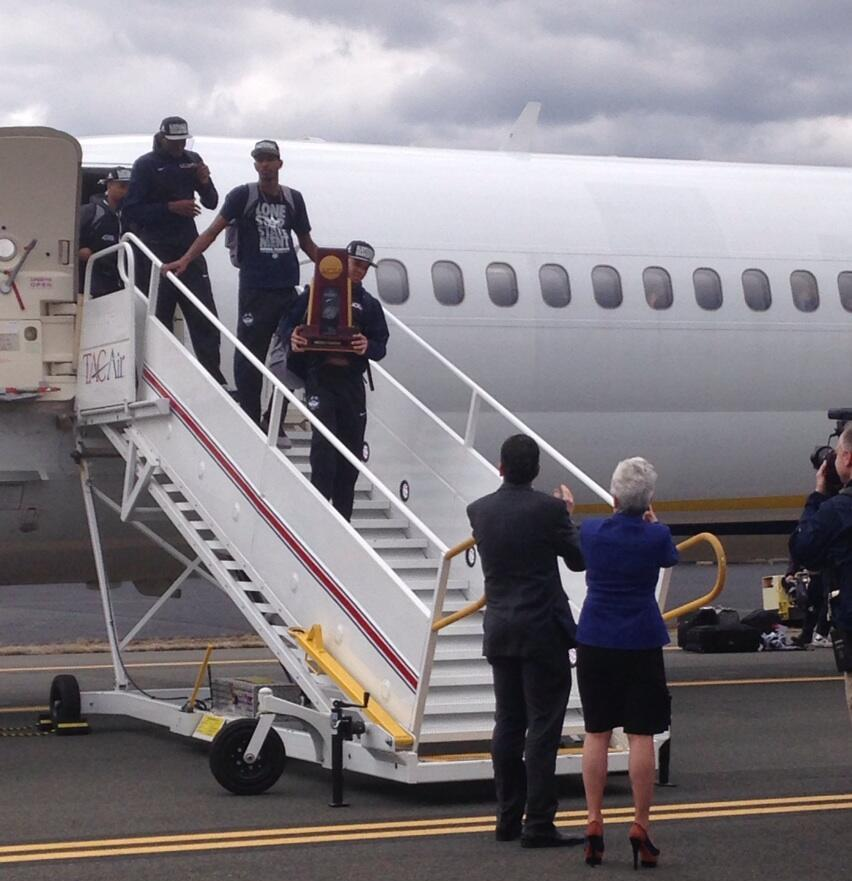
Huskies players return to Connecticut after winning the 2014 championship game, where they are greeted at Bradley International Airport by Connecticut Governor Dannel Malloy and Lieutenant Governor Nancy Wyman.

This is a list of the seasons completed by the UConn Huskies men's basketball team.

UConn has fielded a men's college basketball team since 1900. The team played in the Athletic League of New England State Colleges from 1900 to 1923, in the New England Conference from 1923 to 1946, and then in the Yankee Conference from 1946 to 1976. An independent from 1976 to 1979, UConn became a founding member of the original Big East Conference in 1979. When seven schools left that conference in 2013 to form a new Big East Conference, UConn remained behind in the old conference, which became the American Athletic Conference and is now the American Conference. UConn moved to the new Big East Conference in 2020.

UConn was regular-season champion or co-champion of the New England Conference five times. It was very successful in the Yankee Conference, finishing as regular-season champion or co-champion 16 times; on two other occasions, it played a playoff game to break a first-place tie, winning once for the regular-season championship and losing once to finish the season in second place. From 1975 to 1977 and in 1979, during four of the five seasons immediately preceding the formation of the original Big East Conference, UConn took part in the Eastern College Athletic Conference's regional Division I ECAC Men's Basketball Tournaments for Northeastern universities, winning New England Region championships in 1976 and 1979.

In the original Big East Conference of 1979–2013, UConn won or tied for the regular-season conference title in 1990, 1994, 1995, 1999, 2005, and 2006, and won regular-season division titles in the Big East 6 Division in 1996 and 1998 and in the Big East′s East Division in 2002. It also won the Big East men's basketball tournament seven times, in 1990, 1996, 1998, 1999, 2002, 2004, and 2011, tied only with Georgetown for the most conference tournament titles in the history of the original Big East. The Huskies won their first conference tournament championship in the new Big East in 2024, their eighth conference tournament title in the combined history of the original and new Big East conferences, again tying them with Georgetown for the most tournament championships in the combined history of the two conferences.

During its years in the American, UConn won the American Conference men's basketball tournament once, in 2016.

UConn has appeared in the NCAA Tournament 36 times, winning the national championship six times, in 1999, 2004, 2011, 2014, 2023, and 2024. It also reached the Final Four in 2009 and 2026, advancing to the championship game in the latter season.

UConn has made 13 appearances in the National Invitation Tournament, winning it in 1988.

The team played as the Connecticut Aggies from 1900 to 1935, then as the Connecticut State Huskies from 1935 to 1940, becoming the Connecticut Huskies in 1940. Since 2013, the team has marketed itself as the UConn Huskies.

== Seasons ==
Record table
Season	Coach	Overall	Conference	Standing	Postseason
No coach (Athletic League of New England State Colleges) (1900–1908)
1900–01	No coach	1–0	0–0		
1901–02	No coach	5–5	0–0		
1902–03	No coach	5–2	0–0		
1903–04	No coach	6–3	0–0		
1904–05	No coach	3–3	0–1		
1905–06	No coach	6–3	0–0		
1906–07	No coach	5–7	0–4		
1907–08	No coach	6–9	1–1		
No team (1908–1910)
No coach (Athletic League of New England State Colleges) (1910–1913)
1910–11	No coach	1–2	0–0		
1911–12	No coach	6–3	0–0		
1912–13	No coach	0–3	0–0		
No team (1913–1914)
No coach (Athletic League of New England State Colleges) (1914–1915)
1914–15	No coach	1–4	0–1		
No-coach era:		45–44	1–7		
John F. Donahue (Athletic League of New England State Colleges) (1915–1919)
1915–16	John F. Donahue	5–3	2–1		
1916–17	John F. Donahue	4–6	2–3		
1917–18	John F. Donahue	1–6	0–4		
1918–19	John F. Donahue	1–8	0–4		
John F. Donahue:		11–23	4–12		
Ross Swartz (Athletic League of New England State Colleges) (1919–1921)
1919–20	Ross Swartz	7–5	1–3		
1920–21	Ross Swartz	7–9	3–3		
Ross Swartz:		14–14	4–6		
J. Wilder Tasker (Athletic League of New England State Colleges) (1921–1922)
1921–22	J. Wilder Tasker	15–4	6–1		
J. Wilder Tasker/Roy J. Guyer (Athletic League of New England State Colleges) (1922–1923)
1922–23	J. Wilder Tasker/ Roy J. Guyer	8–7^{[Note A]}	2–1^{[Note A]}		
J. Wilder Tasker:		15–5	6–1		
Roy J. Guyer:		8–6	2–1		
Sumner Dole (New England Conference) (1923–1927)
1923–24	Sumner A. Dole	4–8	1–2	T-2nd	
1924–25	Sumner A. Dole	10–4	3–0	1st	
1925–26	Sumner A. Dole	11–3	3–1	1st	
1926–27	Sumner A. Dole	9–7	3–2	3rd	
Sumner A. Dole (1923–27):		34–22	10–5		
Louis Alexander (New England Conference) (1927–1930)
1927–28	Louis Alexander	11–3	3–1	1st	
1928–29	Louis Alexander	11–6	3–1	2nd	
1929–30	Louis Alexander	8–7	1–2	3rd	
Louis Alexander/Sumner A. Dole (New England Conference) (1930–1931)
1930–31	Louis Alexander/ Sumner A. Dole	10–6^{[Note B]}	2–1^{[Note B]}	2nd	
Louis Alexander:		35–19	7–4		
Sumner A. Dole (overall):		39–25	12–6		
John Heldman Jr. (New England Conference) (1931–1935)
1931–32	John Heldman Jr.	3–11	0–3	4th	
1932–33	John Heldman, Jr.	4–12	0–4	4th	
1933–34	John Heldman, Jr.	5–10	1–2	3rd	
1934–35	John Heldman, Jr.	7–8	1–2	T-3rd	
John Heldman, Jr./J. O. Christian (New England Conference) (1935–1936)
1935–36	John Heldman, Jr./ J. O. Christian	3–11^{[Note C]}	0–3^{[Note C]}	4th	
John Heldman, Jr.:		19–42	2–11		
J. O. Christian:		3–10	0–3		
Don White (New England Conference) (1936–1945)
1936–37	Don White	11–7	5–3	2nd	
1937–38	Donald White	13–5	4–4	T-2nd	
1938–39	Donald White	12–6	6–2	2nd	
1939–40	Donald White	9–7	6–2	2nd	
1940–41	Donald White	14–2	7–1	T-1st	
1941–42	Donald White	12–5	6–2	2nd	
1942–43	Donald White	8–7	5–3	2nd	
1943–44	Donald White	10–9	6–0	1st	
1944–45	Donald White	5–11	4–2	2nd	
Don White:		94–59	49–19		
Blair Gullion (New England Conference) (1945–1946)
1945–46	Blair Gullion	11–6	4–2	2nd	
Blair Gullion/Hugh Greer (Yankee Conference) (1946–1947)
1946–47	Blair Gullion/ Hugh Greer	16–2^{[Note D]}	6–1^{[Note D]}	2nd	
Blair Gullion:		15–8	5–3		
Hugh Greer (Yankee Conference) (1947–1962)
1947–48	Hugh Greer	17–6	6–1	1st	
1948–49	Hugh Greer	19–6	7–1	1st	
1949–50	Hugh Greer	17–8	5–2	2nd	
1950–51	Hugh Greer	22–4	6–1	1st	NCAA first round
1951–52	Hugh Greer	20–7	6–1	1st	
1952–53	Hugh Greer	17–4	5–1	1st	
1953–54	Hugh Greer	23–3	8–0	1st	NCAA first round
1954–55	Hugh Greer	20–5	8–0	1st	NIT first round
1955–56	Hugh Greer	17–11	7–1	1st	NCAA Sweet Sixteen
1956–57	Hugh Greer	17–8	8–0	1st	NCAA University Division First Round
1957–58	Hugh Greer	17–10	9–1	1st	NCAA University Division First Round
1958–59	Hugh Greer	17–7	8–2	1st	NCAA University Division First Round
1959–60	Hugh Greer	17–9	8–2	1st	NCAA University Division First Round
1960–61	Hugh Greer	11–13	6–4	3rd	
1961–62	Hugh Greer	16–8	7–3	2nd	
Hugh Greer/George Wigton (Yankee Conference) (1962–1963)
1962–63	Hugh Greer/ George Wigton	18–7^{[Note E]}	9–1^{[Note E]}	1st	NCAA University Division First Round
Hugh Greer:		286–112	110–22		
George Wigton:		11–4	5–1		
Fred Shabel (Yankee Conference) (1963–1967)
1963–64	Fred Shabel	16–11	9–2^{[Note F]}	1st^{[Note F]}	NCAA University Division Elite Eight
1964–65	Fred Shabel	23–3	10–0	1st	NCAA University Division First Round
1965–66	Fred Shabel	16–8	9–2^{[Note G]}	2nd^{[Note G]}	Declined NIT invitation
1966–67	Fred Shabel	17–7	9–1	1st	NCAA University Division First Round
Fred Shabel:		72–29	37–5		
Burr Carlson (Yankee Conference) (1967–1969)
1967–68	Burr Carlson	11–13	7–3	3rd	
1968–69	Burr Carlson	5–19	3–7	T-4th	
Burr Carlson:		16–32	10–10		
Dee Rowe (Yankee Conference) (1969–1976)
1969–70	Dee Rowe	14–9	8–2	1st	
1970–71	Dee Rowe	10–14	5–5	3rd	
1971–72	Dee Rowe	8–17	5–5	T-4th	
1972–73	Dee Rowe	15–10	9–3	2nd	
1973–74	Dee Rowe	19–8	9–3	2nd	NIT Quarterfinals
1974–75	Dee Rowe	18–10	9–3^{[Note H]}	2nd	NIT First Round
1975–76	Dee Rowe	19–10	7–5^{[Note H]}	T-2nd	NCAA Division I Sweet Sixteen
Dee Rowe (Independent) (1976–1977)
1976–77	Dee Rowe	17–10	^{[Note H]}		
Dee Rowe:		120–88	52–26		
Dom Perno (Independent) (1977–1979)
1977–78	Dom Perno	11–15	^{[Note H]}		
1978–79	Dom Perno	21–8	^{[Note H]}		NCAA Division I Second Round
Dom Perno (Big East Conference) (1979–1986)
1979–80	Dom Perno	20–9	3–3	4th	NIT First Round
1980–81	Dom Perno	20–9	8–6	T-3rd	NIT Second Round
1981–82	Dom Perno	17–11	7–7	T-5th	NIT First Round
1982–83	Dom Perno	12–16	5–11	7th	
1983–84	Dom Perno	13–15	5–11	7th	
1984–85	Dom Perno	13–15	6–10	7th	
1985–86	Dom Perno	12–16	3–13	T-8th	
Dom Perno:		139–114	37–61		
Jim Calhoun (Big East Conference) (1986–2012)
1986–87	Jim Calhoun	9–19	3–13	T-8th	
1987–88	Jim Calhoun	20–14	4–12	9th	NIT Champions
1988–89	Jim Calhoun	18–13	6–10	T-7th	NIT Quarterfinals
1989–90	Jim Calhoun	31–6	12–4	T-1st	NCAA Division I Elite Eight
1990–91	Jim Calhoun	20–11	9–7	T-3rd	NCAA Division I Sweet Sixteen
1991–92	Jim Calhoun	20–10	10–8	T-5th	NCAA Division I Round of 32
1992–93	Jim Calhoun	15–13	9–9	T-4th	NIT First Round
1993–94	Jim Calhoun	29–5	16–2	1st	NCAA Division I Sweet Sixteen
1994–95	Jim Calhoun	28–5	16–2	1st	NCAA Division I Elite Eight
1995–96	Jim Calhoun	32–3	17–1	1st (BE6)^{[Note I]}	NCAA Division I Sweet Sixteen
1996–97	Jim Calhoun	18–15	7–11	6th (BE6)^{[Note I]}	NIT Third Place
1997–98	Jim Calhoun	32–5	15–3	1st (BE6)^{[Note I]}	NCAA Division I Elite Eight
1998–99	Jim Calhoun	34–2	16–2	1st^{[Note J]}	NCAA Division I Champions
1999–2000	Jim Calhoun	25–10	10–6	4th	NCAA Division I Round of 32
2000–01	Jim Calhoun	20–12	8–8	T-3rd (East)^{[Note K]}	NIT Second Round
2001–02	Jim Calhoun	27–7	13–3	1st (East)^{[Note K]}	NCAA Division I Elite Eight
2002–03	Jim Calhoun	23–10	10–6	T-1st (East)^{[Note K]}	NCAA Division I Sweet Sixteen
2003–04	Jim Calhoun	33–6	12–4	2nd^{[Note L]}	NCAA Division I Champions
2004–05	Jim Calhoun	23–8	13–3	T-1st	NCAA Division I Round of 32
2005–06	Jim Calhoun	30–4	14–2	T-1st	NCAA Division I Elite Eight
2006–07	Jim Calhoun	17–14	6–10	11th	
2007–08	Jim Calhoun	24–9	13–5	4th	NCAA Division I Round of 64
2008–09	Jim Calhoun	31–5	15–3	T-2nd	NCAA Division I Final Four
2009–10	Jim Calhoun	18–16	7–11	T-11th	NIT Second Round
2010–11	Jim Calhoun	32–9	9–9	T-9th^{[Note M]}	NCAA Division I Champions
2011–12	Jim Calhoun	20–14	8–10	T-7th	NCAA Division I Round of 64
Jim Calhoun:		629–245	278–164		
Kevin Ollie (Big East Conference) (2012–2013)
2012–13	Kevin Ollie	20–10	10–8	T-7th	
Kevin Ollie (American Athletic Conference) (2013–2018)
2013–14	Kevin Ollie	32–8	12–6	3rd	NCAA Division I Champions
2014–15	Kevin Ollie	20–15	10–8	T-5th	NIT First Round
2015–16	Kevin Ollie	25–11	11–7	6th	NCAA Division I Second Round
2016–17	Kevin Ollie	16–17	9–9	T-5th	
2017–18	Kevin Ollie	0–18^{[Note N]}	0–11^{[Note N]}	12th^{[Note N]}	
Kevin Ollie:		113–79	52–49		
Dan Hurley (American Athletic Conference) (2018–2020)
2018–19	Dan Hurley	16–17	6–12	T-9th	
2019–20	Dan Hurley	19–12	10–8	T-5th	Postseason cancelled^{[Note O]}
Dan Hurley (Big East Conference) (2020–present)
2020–21	Dan Hurley	15–8	11–6	3rd	NCAA Division I Round of 64
2021–22	Dan Hurley	23–10	13–6	3rd	NCAA Division I Round of 64
2022–23	Dan Hurley	31–8	13–7	T-4th	NCAA Division I Champions
2023–24	Dan Hurley	37–3	18–2	1st^{[Note P]}	NCAA Division I Champions
2024–25	Dan Hurley	24–11	14–6	3rd	NCAA Division I Round of 32
2025–26	Dan Hurley	34–6	17–3	2nd	NCAA Division I runner-up
Dan Hurley:		199–75	102–50		
Total:		1,883–1033			
National champion Postseason invitational champion Conference regular season champion Conference regular season and conference tournament champion Division regular season champion Division regular season and conference tournament champion Conference tournament champion

== See also ==
- Georgetown–UConn men's basketball rivalry
- UConn–UMass rivalry
- Syracuse–UConn rivalry

== Notes ==
^A. During the 1922–23 season, Tasker resigned in January 1923 after the first game of the season and before the start of conference play, with Connecticut's record at 0–1. Guyer coached the remainder of the season. Under Guyer, Connecticut went 8–6 overall and 2–1 in conference play.
^B. During the 1930–31 season, Dole coached Connecticut to a 5–3 record while Alexander was on sabbatical. Alexander returned to coach the team for the remainder of the season. Under Alexander, Connecticut went 5–3 overall and 2–1 in conference play.
^C. During the 1935–36 season, Heldman left the team after the first game of the season and before the start of conference play, with Connecticut's record at 0–1. Christian coached the remainder of the season. Under Christian, Connecticut went 3–10 overall and 0–3 in conference play.
^D. During the 1946–47 season, Gullion resigned in mid-season with Connecticut's record at 4–2 overall and 1–1 in the conference. Greer coached the remainder of the season. Under Greer, Connecticut went 12–0 overall and 5–0 in conference play.
^E. Greer died in January 1963 with the 1962–63 season underway and Connecticut's record at 7–3 overall and 4–0 in the conference. Assistant coach George Wigton served as interim head coach for the remainder of the season. Under Wigton, Connecticut went 11–4 overall and 5–1 in conference play.
^F. Connecticut finished the 1963–1964 regular season with a record of 8–2 in the Yankee Conference, tied for first with Rhode Island, but defeated Rhode Island in a single-game playoff to finish as the conference champion with a record of 9–2.
^G. Connecticut finished the 1965–1966 regular season with a record of 9–1 in the Yankee Conference, tied for first with Rhode Island, but lost to Rhode Island in a single-game playoff to finish in second place in the conference with a record of 9–2.
^H. Although a member until 1976 of the Yankee Conference (which had no postseason conference tournament and no automatic bid to the NCAA tournament) and then an independent until 1979, Connecticut participated from 1975 to 1977 and in 1979 in the end-of-season ECAC tournaments organized by the Eastern College Athletic Conference (a loosely organized sports federation of colleges and universities in the Northeastern United States) for ECAC members which otherwise had no access to an automatic bid. Each of these regional tournaments gave its winner an automatic bid to that year's NCAA tournament in the same manner as conference tournaments of conventional conferences. Connecticut played in the ECAC New England Region Tournament each year from 1975 to 1977 and in 1979, winning it and receiving an automatic NCAA tournament bid in 1976 and 1979. Connecticut did not qualify for the 1978 ECAC Tournament.
^I. From the 1995–1996 through 1997–1998 seasons, the original Big East Conference was divided into the Big East 6 and Big East 7 divisions. Connecticut played in the Big East 6 Division during all three seasons.
^J. In the 1998–1999 season, Connecticut won the Big East regular-season and 1999 Big East tournament championships in addition to the national championship.
^K. From the 2000–2001 through 2002–2003 seasons, the original Big East Conference was divided into the East and West divisions. Connecticut played in the East Division during all three seasons.
^L. In the 2003–2004 season, Connecticut won the 2004 Big East tournament championship in addition to the national championship.
^M. In the 2010–2011 season, Connecticut won the 2011 Big East tournament championship in addition to the national championship.
^N. UConn finished the 2017–2018 season with an overall record of 14–18 and in seventh place in the American Athletic Conference with a conference record of 7–11. Due to recruiting violations, all of its wins for the season later were vacated, leaving it with an official record of 0–18 overall and a 12th-place finish in the conference at 0–11.
^O. The 2020 American Athletic Conference men's basketball tournament, 2020 NCAA Division I Men's Basketball Tournament, and 2020 National Invitation Tournament all were cancelled due to the COVID-19 pandemic.
^P. In the 2023–24 season, UConn won the Big East regular-season and 2024 Big East tournament championships in addition to the national championship.
