= List of Rhode Island Rams head football coaches =

List of head football coaches for the Rhode Island Rams

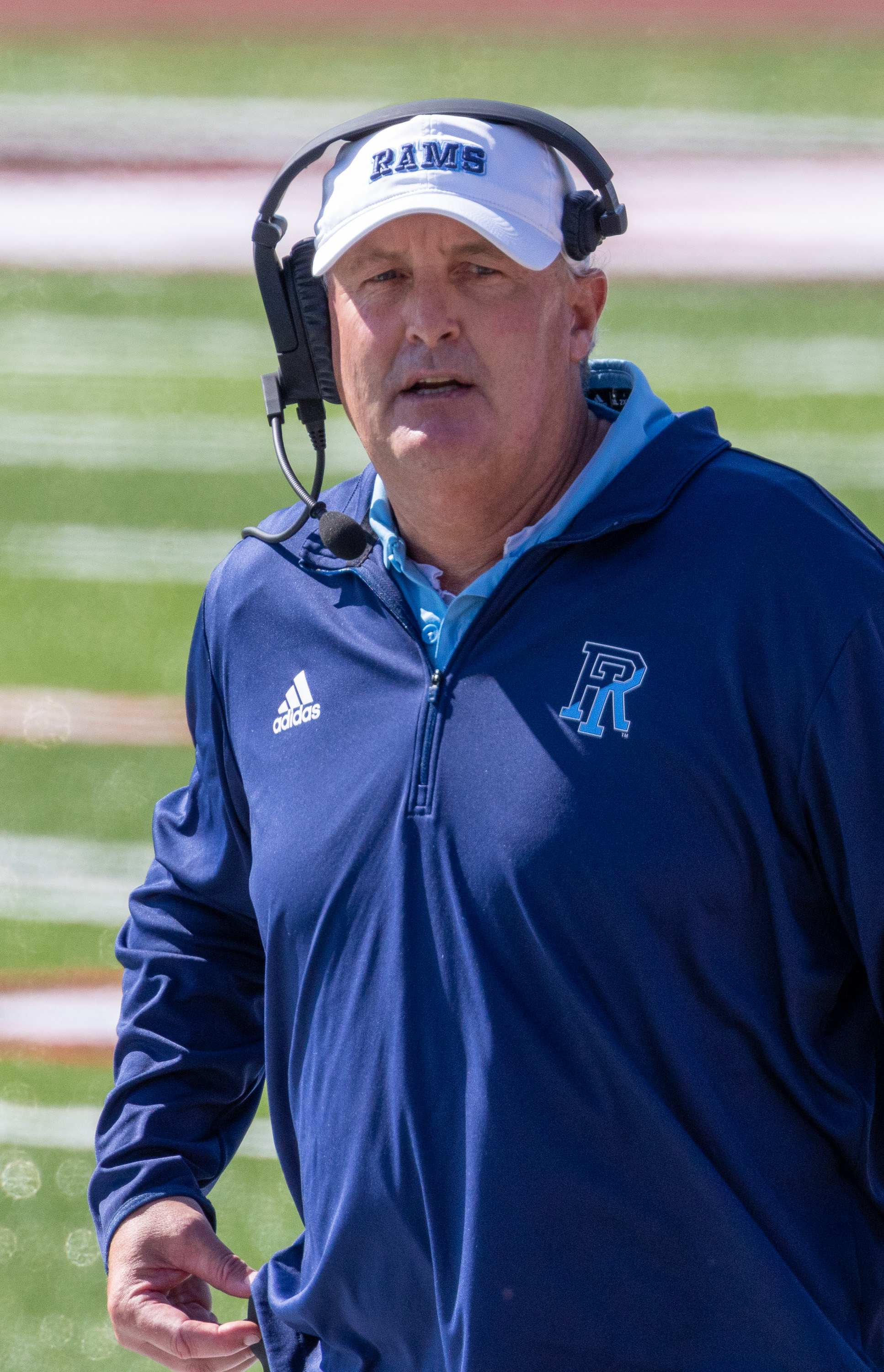
Current head coach Jim Fleming

The Rhode Island Rams college football team represents the University of Rhode Island in the Coastal Athletic Association Football Conference (CAAFC), as part of the NCAA Division I Football Championship Subdivision. The program has had 20 head coaches since it began play during the 1895 season. Since December 2013, Jim Fleming has served as head coach at Rhode Island.

Three coaches have led Rhode Island in postseason playoff or bowl games: Hal Kopp, Bob Griffin, and Fleming. Seven coaches have won conference championships: Frank Keaney won three and Bill Beck and Paul Cieurzo each won one as a member of the New England Conference; Kopp wone three, Herb Maack wone one, and Griffin won three as a member of the Yankee Conference; Fleming won one as a member of the CAAFC.

Keaney is the leader in seasons coached, with 21 years as head coach. Griffin is the leader in games coached (187) and won (79). Kopp has the highest winning percentage of those who have coached more than one game at 0.707. Fred Murray has the lowest winning percentage of those who have coached more than one game, with 0.063.

== Key ==
Key to symbols in coaches list
General		Overall		Conference		Postseason (Note: Although the first Rose Bowl Game was played in 1902, it has been continuously played since the 1916 game, and is recognized as the oldest bowl game by the NCAA. "—" indicates any season prior to 1916 when postseason games were not played.)	
No.	Order of coaches (Note: A running total of the number of head coaches, with coaches who served separate tenures being counted only once. Interim head coaches are represented with "Int" and are not counted in the running total. "—" indicates the team played but either without a coach or no coach is on record. "X" indicates an interim year without play.)	GC	Games coached	CW	Conference wins	PW	Postseason wins
DC	Division championships	OW	Overall wins	CL	Conference losses	PL	Postseason losses
CC	Conference championships	OL	Overall losses	CT	Conference ties	PT	Postseason ties
NC	National championships	OT	Overall ties (Note: Overtime rules in college football were introduced in 1996, making ties impossible in the period since.)	C%	Conference winning percentage		
†	Elected to the College Football Hall of Fame	O%	Overall winning percentage (Note: When computing the win–loss percentage, a tie counts as half a win and half a loss.)				

== Coaches ==
List of head football coaches showing season(s) coached, overall records, conference records, postseason records, championships and selected awards (Note: Statistics correct as of the end of the 2025 NCAA Division I FCS football season.)
No.	Name	Season(s)	GC	OW	OL	OT	O%	CW	CL	CT	C%	PW	PL	PT	DC	CC	NC	Awards
1	Marshall Tyler	1898–1901; 1903–1908	57	25	22	10	0.526	–	–	–	–	–	–	–	–	–	0	–
2	George Cobb	1909–1911; 1913–1914	38	17	16	5	0.513	–	–	–	–	–	–	–	–	–	0	–
3	Robert Bingham	1912	9	6	3	–	0.667	–	–	–	–	–	–	–	–	–	0	–
4	James A. Baldwin	1915–1917	24	8	13	3	0.396	–	–	–	–	–	–	–	–	–	0	–
5	Fred Murray	1919	8	0	7	1	0.063	–	–	–	–	–	–	–	–	–	0	–
6	Frank Keaney	1920–1940	168	70	86	12	0.452	16	26	4	0.391	–	–	–	–	3	0	–
7	Bill Beck	1941; 1946–1949	36	12	22	2	0.361	5	12	0	0.294	–	–	–	–	1	0	–
8	Paul Cieurzo	1942; 1945	9	5	4	0	0.556	1	2	0	0.333	–	–	–	–	1	0	–
9	Hal Kopp	1950; 1952–1955	41	28	11	2	0.707	15	6	0	0.714	0	1	0	–	3	0	–
10	Ed Doherty	1951	8	3	5	0	0.375	1	3	0	0.250	0	0	0	–	0	0	–
11	Herb Maack	1956–1960	41	17	22	2	0.439	8	11	2	0.429	0	0	0	–	1	0	–
12	John Chironna	1961–1962	18	4	11	3	0.306	2	7	0	0.222	0	0	0	–	0	0	–
13	Jack Zilly	1963–1969	64	21	41	2	0.344	10	23	2	0.314	0	0	0	–	0	0	–
14	Jack Gregory	1970–1975	57	22	33	2	0.404	13	18	1	0.422	0	0	0	–	0	0	–
15	Bob Griffin	1976–1992	187	79	107	1	0.425	37	67	0	0.356	2	3	0	–	3	0	–
16	Floyd Keith	1993–1999	76	23	53	0	0.303	17	39	0	0.304	0	0	0	1	0	0	–
17	Tim Stowers	2000–2007	90	33	57	–	0.367	20	51	–	0.282	0	0	–	0	0	0	–
18	Darren Rizzi	2008	12	3	9	–	0.250	1	7	–	0.125	0	0	–	0	0	0	–
19	Joe Trainer	2009–2013	56	12	44	–	0.214	8	32	–	0.200	0	0	–	0	0	0	–
20	Jim Fleming	2014–present	130	59	73	–	0.447	39	52	–	0.429	2	2	–	0	2	0	–
