= 1942 Northeastern Huskies football team =

American college football season

1940 Northeastern Huskies football
- Conference: New England Conference
- Record: 0–5–1 (0–1 New England)
- Head coach: Foxy Flumere (1st season)
- Captain: Richard Grey
- Home stadium: Kent Street Field

1942 New England Conference football standings
	Conf.					Overall
Team	W		L		T	W		L		T
New Hampshire +	3	–	0	–	0	6	–	0	–	0
Connecticut +	2	–	0	–	0	6	–	2	–	0
Northeastern	0	–	1	–	0	0	–	5	–	1
Rhode Island State	0	–	2	–	0	3	–	3	–	0
Maine	0	–	2	–	0	2	–	4	–	0
+ – Conference co-champions

The 1942 Northeastern Huskies football team represented Northeastern University during the 1942 college football season. It was the program's 10th season and they finished with a winless record of 0–5–1 (0–1 in New England Conference play). Their head coach was Foxy Flumere serving in his first (and only) season, and their captain was Richard Grey.

Northeastern was ranked at No. 427 (out of 590 college and military teams) in the final rankings under the Litkenhous Difference by Score System for 1942.

== Schedule ==
Date	Time	Opponent	Site	Result	Source
October 10	2:00 p.m.	at Springfield*	Pratt Field; Springfield, MA	L 0–13	
October 17		Bates*	Kent Street Field; Brookline, MA	L 0–12	
October 24		at American International*	Springfield, MA	L 0–6	
October 31		Tufts*	Kent Street Field; Brookline, MA	T 6–6	
November 7		at Boston University*	Boston, MA	L 6–37	
November 14		at New Hampshire	Lewis Field; Durham, NH	L 0–18	
*Non-conference game; All times are in Eastern time
