= 1929–30 Connecticut Aggies men's basketball team =

American college basketball season

1929–30 Connecticut Aggies men's basketball
- Conference: New England Conference
- Record: 8–7 (1–2 NEC)
- Head coach: Louis Alexander (3rd season)
- Home arena: Hawley Armory

1929–30 New England Conference men's basketball standings
	Conf.				Overall
Team	W		L	PCT	W		L	PCT
Rhode Island	3	–	1	.750	10	–	5	.667
New Hampshire	1	–	1	.500	8	–	6	.571
Connecticut	1	–	2	.333	8	–	7	.533
Northeastern	1	–	2	.333	6	–	8	.429

The 1929–30 Connecticut Aggies men's basketball team represented Connecticut Agricultural College, now the University of Connecticut, in the 1929–30 collegiate men's basketball season. The Aggies completed the season with an 8–7 overall record. The Aggies were members of the New England Conference, where they ended the season with a 1–2 record. The Aggies played their home games at Hawley Armory in Storrs, Connecticut, and were led by third-year head coach Louis Alexander.

== Schedule ==
Date time, TV	Rank^{#}	Opponent^{#}	Result	Record	Site (attendance) city, state
Regular Season
*		East Stroudsburg	W 27–21	1–0	
*		Yale	L 19–25	1–1	
*		Tufts	W 24–22	2–1	
*		Massachusetts	W 37–23	3–1	
*		Brown	L 22–29	3–2	
*		Springfield	L 29–33	3–3	
*		Coast Guard	W 35–20	4–3	
*		Trinity	L 25–29	4–4	
*		Holy Cross	W 33–27	5–4	
		New Hampshire	L 21–24	5–5 (0–1)	
*		St. Michael's	W 39–28	6–5	
		Rhode Island	L 31–36	6–6 (0–2)	
*		Wesleyan	W 33–22	7–6	
*		Holy Cross	L 23–42	7–7	
		Rhode Island	W 53–28	8–7 (1–2)	
*Non-conference game. ^{#}Rankings from AP Poll. (#) Tournament seedings in parentheses. All times are in Eastern Time.

Schedule Source:
