= 1942 Maine Black Bears football team =

American college football season

1942 Maine Black Bears football
- Conference: New England Conference, Maine Intercollegiate Athletic Association
- Record: 2–4 (0–2 New England, 2–1 MIAA)
- Head coach: William C. Kenyon (1st season)
- Captains: Ray Neal; Robert Nutter
- Home stadium: Alumni Field

1942 New England Conference football standings
| | Conf. | | | | | Overall |
| Team | W | | L | | T | W | | L | | T |
|---|---|---|---|---|---|---|---|---|---|---|
| New Hampshire + | 3 | – | 0 | – | 0 | 6 | – | 0 | – | 0 |
| Connecticut + | 2 | – | 0 | – | 0 | 6 | – | 2 | – | 0 |
| Northeastern | 0 | – | 1 | – | 0 | 0 | – | 5 | – | 1 |
| Rhode Island State | 0 | – | 2 | – | 0 | 3 | – | 3 | – | 0 |
| Maine | 0 | – | 2 | – | 0 | 2 | – | 4 | – | 0 |
+ – Conference co-champions

The 1942 Maine Black Bears football team was an American football team that represented the University of Maine as a member of the New England Conference and Maine Intercollegiate Athletic Association during the 1942 college football season. In its first season under head coach William C. Kenyon, the team compiled a 2–4 record (0–2 against New England conference and 2–1 against MIAA opponents). The team played its home games at Alumni Field in Orono, Maine. Ray Neal and Robert Nutter were the team captains.

Maine was ranked at No. 278 (out of 590 college and military teams) in the final rankings under the Litkenhous Difference by Score System for 1942.

== Schedule ==
| Date | Opponent | Site | Result | Attendance | Source |
|---|---|---|---|---|---|
| October 3 | at Columbia* | Baker Field; New York, NY | L 2–34 | 12,000 | |
| October 10 | at New Hampshire | Lewis Field; Durham, NH (rivalry) | L 7–20 | 5,000 | |
| October 17 | Connecticut | Alumni Field; Orono, ME | L 7–26 | 4,000 | |
| October 24 | Bates | Alumni Field; Orono, ME | W 9–7 | | |
| October 31 | Colby | Alumni Field; Orono, ME | W 29–6 | | |
| November 7 | at Bowdoin | Whittier Field; Brunswick, ME | L 6–12 | | |
*Non-conference game
