= 1945 Maine Black Bears football team =

American college football season

1945 Maine Black Bears football
- Conference: New England Conference
- Record: 0–5 (0–3 New England)
- Head coach: William C. Kenyon (3rd season)
- Captain: John Day
- Home stadium: Alumni Field

1945 New England Conference football standings
	Conf.					Overall
Team	W		L		T	W		L		T
Connecticut +	2	–	0	–	0	7	–	1	–	0
Rhode Island State +	1	–	0	–	0	2	–	1	–	0
Maine	0	–	3	–	0	0	–	5	–	0
+ – Conference co-champions

The 1945 Maine Black Bears football team was an American football team that represented the University of Maine as a member of the New England Conference during the 1945 college football season. In its third and final season under head coach William C. Kenyon, the team compiled a 0–5 record (0–3 against conference opponents) and was outscored by a total of 101 to 32. The team played its home games at Alumni Field in Orono, Maine. John Day was the team captain.

== Schedule ==
Date	Opponent	Site	Result	Attendance	Source
October 13	at Rhode Island State	Alumni Field; Orono, ME	L 7–10		
October 20	at Connecticut	Gardner Dow Memorial Field; Storrs, CT	L 12–18	5,000	
October 27	Massachusetts State	Orono, ME	L 0–6	4,000	
November 3	at Massachusetts State	Alumni Field; Amherst, MA	L 13–14		
November 10	Connecticut	Alumni Field; Orono, ME	L 0–53		
