= Charles M. Justice =

American football player and coach (1909–1981)

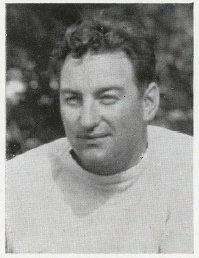
- Justice in The Granite yearbook for the University of New Hampshire, 1942

Biographical details
- Born: January 26, 1909
- Died: February 26, 1981 (aged 72); Albuquerque, New Mexico, U.S.

Playing career
- 1929–1931: Nebraska
- Position: Guard

Coaching career (HC unless noted)
- 1937–1941: New Hampshire (line)
- 1942: New Hampshire

Head coaching record
- Overall: 6–0

Charles Melvin "Chick" Justice (January 26, 1909 – February 26, 1981) was an American college football player and coach. He served as the head coach of the 1942 New Hampshire Wildcats football team, compiling a record of 6–0. Justice played football as a guard at the University of Nebraska from 1929 to 1931. He came to the University of New Hampshire in 1937 as line coach under fellow Nebraska alumnus George Sauer. From 1956 to 1976, he worked for the United States Atomic Energy Commission as the chief of industrial relations. Justice died in Albuquerque, New Mexico, on February 26, 1981.

== Head coaching record ==
Year	Team	Overall	Conference	Standing	Bowl/playoffs
New Hampshire Wildcats (New England Conference) (1942)
1942	New Hampshire	6–0	3–0	T–1st	
New Hampshire:		6–0	3–0		
Total:		6–0			
