= 1971–72 Yale Bulldogs men's basketball team =

American college basketball season

1971–72 Yale Bulldogs men's basketball
- Conference: Ivy League
- Record: 7–17 (5–9 Ivy)
- Head coach: Joe Vancisin (15th season)
- Home arena: John J. Lee Amphitheater

The 1971–72 Yale Bulldogs men's basketball team represented Yale University during the 1971–72 men's college basketball season. The Bulldogs, led by 15th year head coach Joe Vancisin, played their home games at John J. Lee Amphitheater of the Payne Whitney Gymnasium and were members of the Ivy League. They finished the season 7–17, 5–9 in Ivy League play to finish in sixth place.

== Schedule ==
Date time, TV	Rank^{#}	Opponent^{#}	Result	Record	Site city, state
December 1*		Fordham	L 82–119	0–1	Payne Whitney Gymnasium; New Haven, CT
December 4*		at Connecticut	L 64–66	0–2	Hugh S. Greer Field House; Storrs, CT
December 8		at Brown	L 68–72	0–3 (0—1)	Marvel Gymnasium; Providence, RI
December 11*		Holy Cross	L 90–94	0–4 (0—1)	Payne Whitney Gymnasium; New Haven, CT
December 15		Brown	W 73–70	1–4 (1—1)	Payne Whitney Gymnasium; New Haven, CT
December 17*		at Utah	L 78–87	1–5 (1—1)	Jon M. Huntsman Center; Salt Lake City, Utah
December 18*		vs. Oklahoma City	L 99–100	1–6 (1—1)	Jon M. Huntsman Center; Salt Lake City, Utah
December 21*		at Wake Forest	W 85–75	2–6 (1—1)	Winston-Salem Memorial Coliseum; Winston-Salem, NC
December 27*		at St. Louis	L 70–95	2–7 (1—1)	St. Louis Arena; St. Louis, Missouri
December 29*		at SMU	L 80–81	2–8 (1—1)	Moody Coliseum; University Park, Texas
January 1*		at Xavier	L 69–75	2–9 (1—1)	Schmidt Fieldhouse; Cincinnati, Ohio
January 4*		Australian Nat’ls; Exhibition game	W 103–90	2–9 (1—1)	Payne Whitney Gymnasium; New Haven, CT
January 7		Cornell	W 91–87	3–9 (2—1)	Payne Whitney Gymnasium; New Haven, CT
January 8		Columbia	W 71–61	4–9 (3—1)	Payne Whitney Gymnasium; New Haven, CT
January 29*		M. I. T.	W 79–56	5–9 (3—1)	Payne Whitney Gymnasium; New Haven, CT
February 4		at Columbia	L 69–85	5–10 (3—2)	University Heights Gymnasium; New York City
February 5		at Cornell	W 91–87	6–10 (4—2)	Barton Hall; Ithaca, NY
February 11		Harvard	L 74–92	6–11 (4—3)	Payne Whitney Gymnasium; New Haven, CT
February 12		Dartmouth	W 101–91	7–11 (5—3)	Payne Whitney Gymnasium; New Haven, CT
February 18		at Princeton	L 60–73	7–12 (5—4)	Jadwin Gymnasium; Princeton, NJ
February 19		at Penn	L 62–71	7–13 (5—5)	The Palestra; Philadelphia, Pennsylvania
February 25		at Dartmouth	L 73–84	7–14 (5—6)	Alumni Gymnasium; Hanover, NH
February 26		at Harvard	L 72–88	7–15 (5—7)	Malkin Athletic Center; Cambridge, Massachusetts
March 3		Penn	L 65–86	7–16 (5—8)	Payne Whitney Gymnasium; New Haven, CT
March 4		Princeton	L 65–86	7–16 (5—8)	Payne Whitney Gymnasium; New Haven, CT
*Non-conference game. ^{#}Rankings from AP Poll. (#) Tournament seedings in parentheses.
