= Foxy Flumere =

American football, basketball, and baseball coach (1912–1990)

- Flumere pictured in The Cauldron 1943, Northeastern yearbook

Biographical details
- Born: June 17, 1912; Natick, Massachusetts, U.S.
- Died: September 20, 1990 (aged 78); Framingham, Massachusetts, U.S.

Playing career

Football
- 1937–1938: Northeastern

Baseball
- 1938–1939: Northeastern

Coaching career (HC unless noted)

Football
- 1940: Lawrence HS (ME)
- 1941: Northeastern (freshmen)
- 1942: Northeastern
- 1944: Malden HS (MA) (line)
- 1945: Haverhill HS (MA) (line)
- 1946–1947: Mohawk
- 1952–1959: Brandeis (assistant)

Basketball
- 1941–1942: Northeastern (freshmen)
- 1942–1945: Northeastern

Baseball
- 1942: Northeastern (freshmen)
- 1943–1944: Northeastern
- 1957–1961: Brandeis

Administrative career (AD unless noted)
- 1964–1972: Brandeis (assoc. AD)

Head coaching record
- Overall: 0–5–1 (football); 22–28 (basketball); 38–70–4 (baseball)

Emanuel A. "Foxy" Flumere (June 17, 1912 – September 20, 1990) was an American football, basketball, and baseball coach. He served as the head football coach at Northeastern University in 1942, compiling a record of 0–5–1. Flumere was also the head basketball coach at Northeastern from 1942 to 1945, tallying a mark of 22–28. He was head baseball coach at Northeastern from 1943 to 1944 and at Brandeis University from 1957 to 1961, amassing a career college baseball coach record of 38–70–4.

== Biography ==
Flumere played football, baseball, and basketball and ran track for Natick High School. He enrolled at Northeastern in 1932 and played on the school's first freshman football team. An illness interrupted his collegiate career, but he was able to return and excel in football and baseball. He graduated in 1939.

In 1939, Flumere played summer baseball for Bourne in the Cape Cod Baseball League, and was named second-team all-league second baseman. He played semipro baseball for the Worcester Nortons of the New England League.

Flumere began his coaching career at Lawrence High School in Fairfield, Maine. He left in 1941 to become freshman coach at Northeastern. He took over as varsity football, basketball, and baseball in 1942 and led the Huskies to a New England Conference title in baseball in 1944. That fall, he became the line coach at Malden High School in Malden, Massachusetts. The following year, he left Northeastern to become a full-time physical education teacher at MHS. He also served as a scout for the Boston Yanks of the National Football League. In 1946, he became an assistant football coach at Haverhill High School in Haverhill, Massachusetts. The following year, he returned to the college ranks as the head football and basketball coach at Mohawk College, one of three "emergency colleges" established by the state of New York.

In 1952, Flumere became an assistant football coach at Brandeis. He became school's the varsity baseball coach in 1957. He resigned after the 1961 season to focus on his administrative duties at the school. He was named director of the university's department of physical education and intramural athletics that fall. In 1964, the department was combined with the athletic department and Flumere became the associate director of athletics and physical education. He retired in 1972. Flumere died on September 20, 1990 at his home in Framingham, Massachusetts.

== Head coaching record ==
=== Football ===
Year	Team	Overall	Conference	Standing	Bowl/playoffs
Northeastern Huskies (New England Conference) (1942)
1942	Northeastern	0–5–1	0–1	3rd	
Northeastern:		0–5–1	0–1		
Total:		0–5–1			
