= List of Rutgers Scarlet Knights men's basketball seasons =

This is a list of seasons completed by the Rutgers Scarlet Knights men's college basketball team.

== Seasons ==
Statistics overview
Season	Team	Overall	Conference	Standing	Postseason
Frank Gorton (Independent) (1906–1907)
1906–07	Frank Gorton	0–3			
1907–08	Frank Gorton	4–11			
Frank Gorton:		4–14			
Dave Armstrong (Independent) (1913–1914)
1913–14	Dave Armstrong	3–2			
Dave Armstrong:		3–2			
George Davidson (Independent) (1914–1915)
1914–15	George Davidson	1–8			
George Davidson:		1–8			
Frank Hill (Independent) (1915–1942)
1915–16	Frank Hill	3–4			
1916–17	Frank Hill	4–5			
1917–18	Frank Hill	5–3			
1918–19	Frank Hill	6–3			
1919–20	Frank Hill	11–4			
1920–21	Frank Hill	7–5			
1921–22	Frank Hill	10–2			
1922–23	Frank Hill	11–3			
1923–24	Frank Hill	8–4			
1924–25	Frank Hill	7–6			
1925–26	Frank Hill	4–9			
1926–27	Frank Hill	10–3			
1927–28	Frank Hill	9–5			
1928–29	Frank Hill	10–5			
1929–30	Frank Hill	10–4			
1930–31	Frank Hill	6–9			
1931–32	Frank Hill	4–9			
1932–33	Frank Hill	8–6			
1933–34	Frank Hill	9–6			
1934–35	Frank Hill	13–3			
1935–36	Frank Hill	8–7			
1936–37	Frank Hill	13–2			
1937–38	Frank Hill	11–4			
1938–39	Frank Hill	8–6			
1939–40	Frank Hill	5–14			
1940–41	Frank Hill	8–10			
1941–42	Frank Hill	8–10			
Frank Hill (Middle Three Conference) (1942–1943)
1942–43	Frank Hill	7–9	3–1	1st	
Frank Hill:		223–160	3–1		
Thomas Kenneally (Independent) (1944–1945)
1944–45	Thomas Kenneally	11–3			
Thomas Kenneally:		11–3			
Donald White (Independent) (1945–1948)
1945–46	Donald White	13–7			
1946–47	Donald White	7–12			
1947–48	Donald White	14–9			
Donald White (Middle Three Conference) (1948–1952)
1948–49	Donald White	14–12	3–1	1st	
1949–50	Donald White	13–15	3–1	1st	
1950–51	Donald White	7–14	3–1	1st	
1951–52	Donald White	6–13	1–2	2nd	
Donald White (Independent) (1952–1956)
1952–53	Donald White	8–13			
1953–54	Donald White	11–13			
1954–55	Donald White	2–22			
1955–56	Donald White	3–15			
Warren Harris (Independent) (1956–1958)
1956–57	Warren Harris	8–15			
1957–58	Warren Harris	7–15			
Warren Harris (Middle Atlantic Conference) (1958–1959)
1958–59	Warren Harris	9–15	3–5	8th	
Warren Harris:		24–45	3–5		
Anthony Kuolt (Middle Atlantic Conference) (1959–1962)
1959–60	Anthony Kuolt	11–14	4–4	6th	
1960–61	Anthony Kuolt	11–10	3–6	7th	
1961–62	Anthony Kuolt	10–13	2–8	8th	
Anthony Kuolt:		32–37	9–18		
Donald White (Independent) (1962–1963)
1962–63	Donald White	7–16			
Donald White:		105–161	10–5		
Bill Foster (NCAA University Division independent) (1963–1971)
1963–64	Bill Foster	5–17			
1964–65	Bill Foster	12–12			
1965–66	Bill Foster	17–7			
1966–67	Bill Foster	22–7			NIT Third Place
1967–68	Bill Foster	14–10			
1968–69	Bill Foster	21–4			NIT First Round
1969–70	Bill Foster	13–11			
1970–71	Bill Foster	16–7			
Bill Foster:		120–75			
Richard Lloyd (Independent) (1971–1973)
1971–72	Richard Lloyd	14–11			
1972–73	Richard Lloyd	15–11			NIT First Round
Richard Lloyd:		29–22			
Tom Young (Independent) (1973–1976)
1973–74	Tom Young	18–9			NIT First Round
1974–75	Tom Young	22–7			NCAA Division I First Round
1975–76	Tom Young	31–2			NCAA Division I Final Four
Tom Young:		71–18			
Tom Young (Atlantic 10 Conference) (1976–1985)
1976–77	Tom Young	18–10	7–1	1st	NIT First Round
1977–78	Tom Young	24–7	7–3	1st	NIT Third Place
1978–79	Tom Young	22–9	7–3	2nd	NCAA Division I Sweet Sixteen
1979–80	Tom Young	14–14	7–3	1st	
1980–81	Tom Young	16–14	7–6	5th	
1981–82	Tom Young	20–10	9–5	2nd	NIT Second Round
1982–83	Tom Young	23–8	11–3	T–1st	NCAA Division I Second Round
1983–84	Tom Young	15–13	9–9	6th	
1984–85	Tom Young	16–14	9–9	4th	
Tom Young:		168–99	73–42		
Craig Littlepage (Atlantic 10 Conference) (1985–1988)
1985–86	Craig Littlepage	8–21	2–16	10th	
1986–87	Craig Littlepage	8–20	5–13	9th	
1987–88	Craig Littlepage	7–22	3–15	10th	
Craig Littlepage:		23–63	10–44		
Bob Wenzel (Atlantic 10 Conference) (1988–1995)
1988–89	Bob Wenzel	18–13	13–5	3rd	NCAA Division I First Round
1989–90	Bob Wenzel	18–17	11–7	3rd	NIT Quarterfinal
1990–91	Bob Wenzel	19–10	14–4	1st	NCAA Division I First Round
1991–92	Bob Wenzel	16–15	6–10	6th	NIT Second Round
1992–93	Bob Wenzel	13–15	6–8	7th	
1993–94	Bob Wenzel	11–16	6–10	7th	
1994–95	Bob Wenzel	13–15	7–9	6th	
Bob Wenzel (Big East Conference) (1995–1997)
1995–96	Bob Wenzel	9–18	6–12	10th	
1996–97	Bob Wenzel	11–16	5–13	13th	
Bob Wenzel:		128–135	74–78		
Kevin Bannon (Big East Conference) (1997–2001)
1997–98	Kevin Bannon	14–15	6–12	12th	
1998–99	Kevin Bannon	19–13	9–9	6th	NIT Second Round
1999–00	Kevin Bannon	15–16	6–10	10th	NIT First Round
2000–01	Kevin Bannon	11–16	3–13	13th	
Kevin Bannon:		59–60	24–44		
Gary Waters (Big East Conference) (2001–2006)
2001–02	Gary Waters	18–13	8–8	5th	NIT First Round
2002–03	Gary Waters	12–16	4–12	7th	
2003–04	Gary Waters	20–13	7–9	9th	NIT Runner-up
2004–05	Gary Waters	10–19	2–14	12th	
2005–06	Gary Waters	19–14	7–9	10th	NIT First Round
Gary Waters:		79–75	28–52		
Fred Hill (Big East Conference) (2006–2010)
2006–07	Fred Hill	10–19	3–13	T–14th	
2007–08	Fred Hill	11–20	3–15	T–15th	
2008–09	Fred Hill	11–21	2–16	15th	
2009–10	Fred Hill	15–17	5–13	14th	
Fred Hill:		57–77	13–57		
Mike Rice Jr. (Big East Conference) (2010–2013)
2010–11	Mike Rice Jr.	15–17	5–13	13th	
2011–12	Mike Rice Jr.	14–18	6–12	T–13th	
2012–13	Mike Rice Jr.	15–16	5–13	12th	
Mike Rice Jr.:		44–51	16–38		
Eddie Jordan (American Athletic Conference) (2013–2014)
2013–14	Eddie Jordan	12–21	5–13	7th	
Eddie Jordan (Big Ten Conference) (2014–2016)
2014–15	Eddie Jordan	10–22	2–16	14th	
2015–16	Eddie Jordan	7–25	1–17	14th	
Eddie Jordan:		29–68	8–46		
Steve Pikiell (Big Ten Conference) (2016–present)
2016–17	Steve Pikiell	15–18	3–15	14th	
2017–18	Steve Pikiell	15–19	3–15	14th	
2018–19	Steve Pikiell	14–17	7–13	12th	
2019–20	Steve Pikiell	20–11	11–9	T–5th	No postseason held
2020–21	Steve Pikiell	16–12	10–10	T–6th	NCAA Division I Second Round
2021–22	Steve Pikiell	18–14	12–8	T–4th	NCAA Division I First Four
2022–23	Steve Pikiell	19–15	10–10	T–9th	NIT First Round
2023–24	Steve Pikiell	15–17	7–13	T–12th	
2024–25	Steve Pikiell	15–17	8–12	11th	
Steve Pikiell:		147–140	71–105		
Total:		1,347–1,312			
National champion Postseason invitational champion Conference regular season champion Conference regular season and conference tournament champion Division regular season champion Division regular season and conference tournament champion Conference tournament champion
