= 1942 Rhode Island State Rams football team =

American college football season

1942 Rhode Island State Rams football
- Conference: New England Conference
- Record: 3–3 (0–2 New England)
- Head coach: Paul Cieurzo (1st season)
- Home stadium: Meade Stadium

1942 New England Conference football standings
| | Conf. | | | | | Overall |
| Team | W | | L | | T | W | | L | | T |
|---|---|---|---|---|---|---|---|---|---|---|
| New Hampshire + | 3 | – | 0 | – | 0 | 6 | – | 0 | – | 0 |
| Connecticut + | 2 | – | 0 | – | 0 | 6 | – | 2 | – | 0 |
| Northeastern | 0 | – | 1 | – | 0 | 0 | – | 5 | – | 1 |
| Rhode Island State | 0 | – | 2 | – | 0 | 3 | – | 3 | – | 0 |
| Maine | 0 | – | 2 | – | 0 | 2 | – | 4 | – | 0 |
+ – Conference co-champions

The 1942 Rhode Island Rams football team was an American football team that represented Rhode Island State College (later renamed the University of Rhode Island) as a member of the New England Conference during the 1942 college football season. In its first season under head coach Paul Cieurzo, the team compiled a 3–3 record (0–2 against conference opponents) and tied for last place in the conference.

Rhode Island was ranked at No. 217 (out of 590 college and military teams) in the final rankings under the Litkenhous Difference by Score System for 1942.

The team played its home games at Meade Stadium in Kingston, Rhode Island.

== Schedule ==
| Date | Opponent | Site | Result | Source |
|---|---|---|---|---|
| September 26 | at Vermont* | Centennial Field; Burlington, VT | W 70–13 | |
| October 3 | at Brown* | Brown Stadium; Providence, RI (rivalry)] | L 0–28 | |
| October 17 | at Massachusetts State* | Alumni Field; Amherst, MA | W 21–6 | |
| October 24 | at New Hampshire | Lewis Field; Durham, NH | L 13–14 | |
| October 31 | WPI^{†}* | Meade Field; Kingston, RI | L 66–13 | |
| November 7 | at Connecticut | Gardner Dow Athletic Fields; Storrs, CT (rivalry) | L 6–13 | |
*Non-conference game; ^{†}Homecoming
