= 1937–38 Connecticut State Huskies men's basketball team =

American college basketball season

1937–38 Connecticut State Huskies men's basketball
- Conference: New England Conference
- Record: 13–5 (4–4 NEC)
- Head coach: Don White (2nd season)
- Home arena: Hawley Armory

1937–38 New England Conference men's basketball standings
	Conf.				Overall
Team	W		L	PCT	W		L	PCT
Rhode Island State	8	–	0	1.000	19	–	2	.905
Connecticut	4	–	4	.500	13	–	5	.722
New Hampshire	4	–	4	.500	12	–	6	.667
Northeastern	4	–	4	.500	6	–	12	.333
Maine	1	–	7	.125	4	–	9	.308

The 1937–38 Connecticut State Huskies men's basketball team represented Connecticut State College, now the University of Connecticut, in the 1937–38 collegiate men's basketball season. The Huskies completed the season with a 13–5 overall record. The Huskies were members of the New England Conference, where they ended the season with a 4–4 record. The Huskies played their home games at Hawley Armory in Storrs, Connecticut, and were led by second-year head coach Don White.

== Schedule ==
Date time, TV	Rank^{#}	Opponent^{#}	Result	Record	Site (attendance) city, state
Regular Season
*		Arnold	W 61–40	1–0	
*		Providence	W 40–32	2–0	
*		Brown	W 56–51	3–0	
		New Hampshire	W 43–41	4–0 (1–0)	
*		Wesleyan	L 48–57	4–1	
		Maine	W 54–46	5–1 (2–0)	
*		Coast Guard	W 52–40	6–1	
		Maine	W 51–39	7–1 (3–0)	
*		Coast Guard	W 59–39	8–1	
		New Hampshire	L 42–48	8–2 (3–1)	
		Rhode Island	L 45–62	8–3 (3–2)	
*		Alumni	W 80–32	9–3	
*		Massachusetts	W 60–51	10–3	
		Northeastern	W 59–32	11–3 (4–2)	
*		Trinity	W 38–35	12–3	
		Rhode Island	L 65–67	12–4 (4–3)	
*		Worcester Polytech	W 61–59	13–4	
		Northeastern	L 40–45	13–5 (4–4)	
*Non-conference game. ^{#}Rankings from AP Poll. (#) Tournament seedings in parentheses. All times are in Eastern Time.

Schedule Source:
