= 1939–40 Connecticut Huskies men's basketball team =

American college basketball season

1939–40 Connecticut Huskies men's basketball
- Conference: New England Conference
- Record: 9–7 (6–2 NEC)
- Head coach: Don White (4th season)
- Home arena: Hawley Armory

1939–40 New England Conference men's basketball standings
	Conf.				Overall
Team	W		L	PCT	W		L	PCT
Rhode Island State	8	–	0	1.000	19	–	3	.864
Connecticut	6	–	2	.750	9	–	7	.563
New Hampshire	3	–	5	.375	5	–	10	.333
Northeastern	3	–	5	.375	4	–	13	.235
Maine	0	–	8	.000	3	–	9	.250

The 1939–40 Connecticut Huskies men's basketball team represented University of Connecticut in the 1939–40 collegiate men's basketball season. The Huskies completed the season with a 9–7 overall record. The Huskies were members of the New England Conference, where they ended the season with a 6–2 record. The Huskies played their home games at Hawley Armory in Storrs, Connecticut, and were led by fourth-year head coach Don White.

== Schedule ==
Date time, TV	Rank^{#}	Opponent^{#}	Result	Record	Site (attendance) city, state
Regular Season
*		St. Lawrence	L 35–39	0–1	
*		Brown	L 36–44	0–2	
*		Michigan	L 45–62	0–3	
		Northeastern	W 61–38	1–3 (1–0)	
		Maine	W 56–38	2–3 (2–0)	
		New Hampshire	W 66–36	3–3 (3–0)	
*		Coast Guard	W 80–27	4–3	
		New Hampshire	W 50–46	5–3 (4–0)	
		Maine	W 71–68	6–3 (5–0)	
		Northeastern	W 67–49	7–3 (6–0)	
*		Massachusetts	W 65–35	8–3	
*		Wesleyan	W 55–44	9–3	
		Rhode Island	L 81–102	9–4 (6–1)	
*		Providence	L 51–55	9–5	
*		Worcester Polytech	L 60–63	9–6	
		Rhode Island	L 48–49	9–7 (6–2)	
*Non-conference game. ^{#}Rankings from AP Poll. (#) Tournament seedings in parentheses. All times are in Eastern Time.

Schedule Source:
