= 1944–45 Connecticut Huskies men's basketball team =

American college basketball season

1944–45 Connecticut Huskies men's basketball
- Conference: New England Conference
- Record: 5–11 (4–2 NEC)
- Head coach: Don White (9th season)
- Home arena: Hawley Armory

1944–45 New England Conference men's basketball standings
	Conf.				Overall
Team	W		L	PCT	W		L	PCT
Rhode Island	5	–	1	.833	20	–	5	.800
Connecticut	4	–	2	.667	5	–	11	.313
Northeastern	2	–	4	.333	7	–	8	.467
Maine	1	–	5	.167	4	–	8	.333

The 1944–45 Connecticut Huskies men's basketball team represented University of Connecticut in the 1944–45 collegiate men's basketball season. The Huskies completed the season with a 5–11 overall record. The Huskies were members of the New England Conference, where they ended the season with a 4–2 record. The Huskies played their home games at Hawley Armory in Storrs, Connecticut, and were led by ninth-year head coach Don White.

== Schedule ==
Date time, TV	Rank^{#}	Opponent^{#}	Result	Record	Site (attendance) city, state
Regular Season
*		Wesleyan	L 43–48	0–1	
*		Brown	L 45–65	0–2	
*		Worcester Polytech	L 49–51	0–3	
*		New York University	L 45–73	0–4	
		Maine	W 69–41	1–4 (1–0)	
		Rhode Island	L 57–82	1–5 (1–1)	
*		Wesleyan	L 31–39	1–6	
*		Brown	L 45–65	1–7	
		Northeastern	W 53–41	2–7 (2–1)	
		Maine	L 44–45	2–8 (2–2)	
*		Yale	L 41–79	2–9	
*		Providence	W 48–42	3–9	
*		Coast Guard	L 31–34	3–10	
		Northeastern	W 72–54	4–10 (3–2)	
*		Coast Guard	L 40–44	4–11	
		Rhode Island	W 67–59	5–11 (4–2)	
*Non-conference game. ^{#}Rankings from AP Poll. (#) Tournament seedings in parentheses. All times are in Eastern Time.

Schedule Source:
