= 1933–34 Connecticut Aggies men's basketball team =

American college basketball season

1933–34 Connecticut Aggies men's basketball
- Conference: New England Conference
- Record: 5–10 (1–2 NEC)
- Head coach: John J. Heldman, Jr. (3rd season)
- Home arena: Hawley Armory

1933–34 New England Conference men's basketball standings
	Conf.				Overall
Team	W		L	PCT	W		L	PCT
Rhode Island	4	–	0	1.000	13	–	3	.813
Northeastern	2	–	1	.667	10	–	3	.769
Connecticut	1	–	2	.333	5	–	10	.333
New Hampshire	0	–	2	.000	6	–	7	.462

The 1933–34 Connecticut Aggies men's basketball team represented Connecticut State College, now the University of Connecticut, in the 1933–34 collegiate men's basketball season. The Aggies completed the season with a 5–10 overall record. The Aggies were members of the New England Conference, where they ended the season with a 1–2 record. The Aggies played their home games at Hawley Armory in Storrs, Connecticut, and were led by third-year head coach John J. Heldman, Jr. The season was marred by a racist incident targeting sophomore player Harrison Fitch during an away game against the US Coast Guard Academy in New London on January 27, 1934.

== Schedule ==
Date time, TV	Rank^{#}	Opponent^{#}	Result	Record	Site (attendance) city, state
Regular Season
*		Alumni	W 40–30	1–0	
*		Wesleyan	L 21–28	1–1	
*		Worcester Polytech	L 35–41	1–2	
*		Massachusetts	L 31–37	1–3	
*		Clark	W 44–26	2–3	
*		Brown	L 30–40	2–4	
*		Coast Guard	W 31–29	3–4	
*		Boston University	L 33–37	3–5	
		New Hampshire	W 21–20	4–5 (1–0)	
*		Trinity	L 15–31	4–6	
		Rhode Island	L 26–50	4–7 (1–1)	
*		Trinity	L 21–28	4–8	
*		Norwich University	W 32–27	5–8	
*		Springfield	L 40–46	5–9	
		Rhode Island	L 38–44	5–10 (1–2)	
*Non-conference game. ^{#}Rankings from AP Poll. (#) Tournament seedings in parentheses. All times are in Eastern Time.

Schedule Source:
