= 1926–27 Connecticut Aggies men's basketball team =

American college basketball season

1926–1927 Connecticut Aggies men's basketball
- Conference: New England Conference
- Record: 9–7 (3–2 NEC)
- Head coach: Sumner A. Dole (4th season)
- Home arena: Hawley Armory

1926–27 New England Conference men's basketball standings
	Conf.				Overall
Team	W		L	PCT	W		L	PCT
New Hampshire	5	–	0	1.000	14	–	1	.933
Rhode Island	5	–	2	.714	13	–	3	.813
Connecticut	3	–	2	.600	9	–	7	.563
Northeastern	0	–	4	.000	8	–	9	.471
Maine	0	–	5	.000	2	–	9	.182

The 1926–27 Connecticut Aggies men's basketball team represented Connecticut Agricultural College, now the University of Connecticut, in the 1926–27 collegiate men's basketball season. The Aggies completed the season with a 9–7 overall record. The Aggies were members of the New England Conference, where they ended the season with a 3–2 record. The Aggies played their home games at Hawley Armory in Storrs, Connecticut, and were led by fourth-year head coach Sumner A. Dole.

== Schedule ==
Date time, TV	Rank^{#}	Opponent^{#}	Result	Record	Site (attendance) city, state
Regular Season
*		Crescent A.C.	L 18–37	0–1	
*		Cooper Union	W 45–16	1–1	
		Northeastern	W 45–39	2–1 (1–0)	
*		Harvard	W 39–24	3–1	
*		Tufts	L 37–44	3–2	
*		Springfield	L 24–35	3–3	
		New Hampshire	L 24–32	3–4 (1–1)	
*		Norwich	W 35–23	4–4	
*		Vermont	L 16–31	4–5	
*		Trinity	W 31–15	5–5	
*		Holy Cross	L 19–30	5–6	
*		Wesleyan	W 41–26	6–6	
		Rhode Island	L 33–37	6–7 (1–2)	
		Rhode Island	W 34–30	7–7 (2–2)	
		Maine	W 38–28	8–7 (3–2)	
*		Coast Guard	W 36–32	9–7	
*Non-conference game. ^{#}Rankings from AP Poll. (#) Tournament seedings in parentheses. All times are in Eastern Time.

Schedule Source:
