= 1934–35 Connecticut State Huskies men's basketball team =

American college basketball season

1934–35 Connecticut State Huskies men's basketball
- Conference: New England Conference
- Record: 7–8 (1–2 NEC)
- Head coach: John J. Heldman, Jr. (4th season)
- Home arena: Hawley Armory

1934–35 New England Conference men's basketball standings
	Conf.				Overall
Team	W		L	PCT	W		L	PCT
Rhode Island	4	–	1	.800	12	–	6	.667
New Hampshire	2	–	1	.667	11	–	3	.786
Northeastern	1	–	2	.333	7	–	6	.538
Connecticut	1	–	2	.333	7	–	8	.467

The 1934–35 Connecticut State Huskies men's basketball team represented Connecticut State College, now the University of Connecticut, in the 1934–35 collegiate men's basketball season. This was the first year that the team was named the Huskies. The Huskies completed the season with a 7–8 overall record. The Huskies were members of the New England Conference, where they ended the season with a 1–2 record. The Huskies played their home games at Hawley Armory in Storrs, Connecticut, and were led by fourth-year head coach John J. Heldman, Jr.

== Schedule ==
Date time, TV	Rank^{#}	Opponent^{#}	Result	Record	Site (attendance) city, state
Regular Season
*		Alumni	W 44–23	1–0	
*		American International	W 39–27	2–0	
*		Clark	W 41–19	3–0	
*		Wesleyan	L 30–44	3–1	
*		Massachusetts	L 20–22	3–2	
*		Brown	L 31–39	3–3	
		New Hampshire	W 41–32	4–3 (1–0)	
*		Boston University	W 42–31	5–3	
*		Trinity	L 23–28	5–4	
		Rhode Island	L 32–57	5–5 (1–1)	
*		Springfield	L 18–43	5–6	
*		Trinity	L 27–28	5–7	
		Rhode Island	L 45–62	5–8 (1–2)	
*		Worcester Polytech	W 44–30	6–8	
*		Coast Guard	W 35–30	7–8	
*Non-conference game. ^{#}Rankings from AP Poll. (#) Tournament seedings in parentheses. All times are in Eastern Time.

Schedule Source:
