= 1931–32 Connecticut Aggies men's basketball team =

American college basketball season

1931–32 Connecticut Aggies men's basketball
- Conference: New England Conference
- Record: 3–11 (0–3 NEC)
- Head coach: John J. Heldman, Jr. (1st season)
- Home arena: Hawley Armory

1931–32 New England Conference men's basketball standings
	Conf.				Overall
Team	W		L	PCT	W		L	PCT
New Hampshire	2	–	0	1.000	8	–	6	.571
Rhode Island	3	–	1	.750	13	–	3	.813
Northeastern	1	–	2	.333	10	–	5	.667
Connecticut	0	–	3	.000	3	–	11	.214

The 1931–32 Connecticut Aggies men's basketball team represented Connecticut Agricultural College, now the University of Connecticut, in the 1931–32 collegiate men's basketball season. The Aggies completed the season with a 3–11 overall record. The Aggies were members of the New England Conference, where they ended the season with a 0–3 record. The Aggies played their home games at Hawley Armory in Storrs, Connecticut, and were led by first-year head coach John J. Heldman, Jr.

== Schedule ==
Date time, TV	Rank^{#}	Opponent^{#}	Result	Record	Site (attendance) city, state
Regular Season
*		Alumni	W 37–36	1–0	
*		Brown	W 27–22	2–0	
*		Tufts	L 21–34	2–1	
*		Boston University	L 26–30	2–2	
*		Bridgewater Normal	W 43–34	3–2	
*		Massachusetts	L 19–33	3–3	
*		Wesleyan	L 29–40	3–4	
*		Springfield	L 19–52	3–5	
		New Hampshire	L 19–36	3–6 (0–1)	
*		Coast Guard	L 22–40	3–7	
		Rhode Island	L 31–45	3–8 (0–2)	
*		Clark	L 22–38	3–9	
*		Trinity	L 20–26	3–10	
		Rhode Island	L 32–33	3–11 (0–3)	
*Non-conference game. ^{#}Rankings from AP Poll. (#) Tournament seedings in parentheses. All times are in Eastern Time.

Schedule Source:
