= 1942 Connecticut Huskies football team =

American college football season

1942 Connecticut Huskies football

New England Conference co-champion
- Conference: New England Conference
- Record: 6–2 (2–0 New England)
- Head coach: J. Orlean Christian (9th season)
- Home stadium: Gardner Dow Athletic Fields

1942 New England Conference football standings
	Conf.					Overall
Team	W		L		T	W		L		T
New Hampshire +	3	–	0	–	0	6	–	0	–	0
Connecticut +	2	–	0	–	0	6	–	2	–	0
Northeastern	0	–	1	–	0	0	–	5	–	1
Rhode Island State	0	–	2	–	0	3	–	3	–	0
Maine	0	–	2	–	0	2	–	4	–	0
+ – Conference co-champions

The 1942 Connecticut Huskies football team represented the University of Connecticut in the 1942 college football season. The Huskies were led by ninth-year head coach J. Orlean Christian and completed the season with a record of 6–2. No team was fielded in 1943 due to World War II.

Connecticut State was ranked at No. 191 (out of 590 college and military teams) in the final rankings under the Litkenhous Difference by Score System for 1942.

== Schedule ==
Date	Opponent	Site	Result	Attendance	Source
September 26	at Maryland*	Byrd Stadium; College Park, MD	L 0–34	6,000	
October 3	Massachusetts State*	Gardner Dow Athletic Fields; Storrs, CT (rivalry)	W 26–0		
October 10	Wesleyan*	Gardner Dow Athletic Fields; Storrs, CT	L 7–20		
October 17	at Maine	Alumni Field; Orono, ME	W 26–7	4,000	
October 24	Springfield*	Gardner Dow Athletic Fields; Storrs, CT	W 21–14		
October 31	at Middlebury*	Middlebury, VT	W 32–0		
November 7	Rhode Island State	Gardner Dow Athletic Fields; Storrs, CT (rivalry)	W 13–6		
November 14	at Coast Guard*	Cadet Memorial Field; New London, CT	W 16–0		
*Non-conference game
