= 1945 Connecticut Huskies football team =

American college football season

1945 Connecticut Huskies football

New England Conference co-champion
- Conference: New England Conference
- Record: 7–1 (2–0 New England)
- Head coach: J. Orlean Christian (11th season)
- Home stadium: Gardner Dow Athletic Fields

1945 New England Conference football standings
	Conf.					Overall
Team	W		L		T	W		L		T
Connecticut +	2	–	0	–	0	7	–	1	–	0
Rhode Island State +	1	–	0	–	0	2	–	1	–	0
Maine	0	–	3	–	0	0	–	5	–	0
+ – Conference co-champions

The 1945 Connecticut Huskies football team represented the University of Connecticut in the 1945 college football season. The Huskies were led by 11th-year head coach J. Orlean Christian and completed the season with a record of 7–1.

== Schedule ==
Date	Opponent	Site	Result	Attendance	Source
September 29	at Worcester Tech*	Worcester, MA	W 46–0		
October 6	Middlebury*	Gardner Dow Athletic Fields; Storrs, CT	W 28–6		
October 13	at Franklin & Marshall*	Sponaugle–Williamson Field; Lancaster, PA	L 0–19		
October 20	at Maine	Gardner Dow Memorial Field; Storrs, CT	W 18–12	5,000	
October 27	at Lehigh*	Taylor Stadium; Bethlehem, PA	W 33–6	5,000	
November 3	Amherst*	Gardner Dow Athletic Fields; Storrs, CT	W 33–0		
November 10	at Maine	Alumni Field; Orono, ME	W 53–0		
November 17	Boston University*	Gardner Dow Athletic Fields; Storrs, CT	W 54–0	4,000	
*Non-conference game

== After the season ==
=== NFL draft ===
The following Huskies were drafted into the National Football League following the season.

Round	Pick	Player	Position	NFL club
6	49	Walt Trojanowski	Back	Washington Redskins
9	74	Walt Dropo	End	Chicago Bears
