= Paul Cieurzo =

American football coach (1907–1999)

Biographical details
- Born: November 1, 1907; Fairhaven, Massachusetts, U.S.
- Died: January 13, 1999 (aged 91); Wakefield, Rhode Island, U.S.

Playing career
- 1927–1930: Rhode Island State

Coaching career (HC unless noted)
- 1931–1941: Rhode Island State (assistant)
- 1942–1945: Rhode Island State

Head coaching record
- Overall: 5–4

Accomplishments and honors

Championships
- 1 New England (1945)

Paul Francis Cieurzo (November 1, 1907 – January 13, 1999) was an American college football coach. He served as the head football coach at Rhode Island State College—now known as the University of Rhode Island—from 1942 to 1945, compiling a record of 5–4. Cieurzo died aged 91 in 1999.

== Head coaching record ==
Year	Team	Overall	Conference	Standing	Bowl/playoffs
Rhode Island State Rams (New England Conference) (1942–1945)
1942	Rhode Island State	3–3	0–2	T–4th	
1943	No team—World War II				
1944	No team—World War II				
1945	Rhode Island State	2–1	1–0	T–1st	
Rhode Island State:		5–4	1–2		
Total:		5–4			
National championship Conference title Conference division title or championship game berth
