= 1930–31 Connecticut Aggies men's basketball team =

American college basketball season

1930–31 Connecticut Aggies men's basketball
- Conference: New England Conference
- Record: 10–6 (2–1 NEC)
- Head coach: Sumner Dole (5th year); Louis Alexander (4th year)
- Home arena: Hawley Armory

1930–31 New England Conference men's basketball standings
	Conf.				Overall
Team	W		L	PCT	W		L	PCT
Rhode Island	3	–	1	.750	13	–	4	.765
Connecticut	2	–	1	.667	10	–	6	.625
Northeastern	1	–	2	.333	12	–	8	.600
New Hampshire	0	–	2	.000	8	–	8	.500

The 1930–31 Connecticut Aggies men's basketball team represented Connecticut Agricultural College, now the University of Connecticut, in the 1930–31 collegiate men's basketball season. The Aggies completed the season with a 10–6 overall record. The Aggies were members of the New England Conference, where they ended the season with a 2–1 record. The Aggies played their home games at Hawley Armory in Storrs, Connecticut, and were led by fourth-year head coach Louis Alexander and returning fifth-year head coach Sumner Dole.

== Schedule ==
Date time, TV	Rank^{#}	Opponent^{#}	Result	Record	Site (attendance) city, state
Regular Season
*		Bridgewater Normal	W 38–29	1–0	
*		Fitchburg Normal	W 57–26	2–0	
*		Boston University	W 39–33	3–0	
*		East Stroudsburg	W 44–20	4–0	
*		Tufts	W 33–30	5–0	
*		Yale	L 17–36	5–1	
*		Brown	L 35–39	5–2	
*		Wesleyan	L 27–36	5–3	
*		Massachusetts	L 13–14	5–4	
*		Trinity	W 32–15	6–4	
		Rhode Island	W 28–27	7–4 (1–0)	
*		Springfield	W 32–24	8–4	
		New Hampshire	W 44–32	9–4 (2–0)	
*		Coast Guard	W 35–33	10–4	
		Rhode Island	L 21–31	10–5 (2–1)	
*		Holy Cross	L 30–44	10–6	
*Non-conference game. ^{#}Rankings from AP Poll. (#) Tournament seedings in parentheses. All times are in Eastern Time.

Schedule Source:
