= 1942–43 Connecticut Huskies men's basketball team =

1942–43 Connecticut Huskies men's basketball
- Conference: New England Conference
- Record: 8–7 (5–3 NEC)
- Head coach: Don White (7th season)
- Home arena: Hawley Armory

1942–43 New England Conference men's basketball standings
	Conf.				Overall
Team	W		L	PCT	W		L	PCT
Rhode Island State	7	–	1	.875	16	–	3	.842
Connecticut	5	–	3	.625	8	–	7	.533
Maine	4	–	4	.500	9	–	6	.600
Northeastern	2	–	6	.250	7	–	12	.368
New Hampshire	2	–	6	.250	4	–	14	.222

The 1942–43 Connecticut Huskies men's basketball team represented University of Connecticut in the 1942–43 collegiate men's basketball season. The Huskies completed the season with an 8–7 overall record. The Huskies were members of the New England Conference, where they ended the season with a 5–3 record. The Huskies played their home games at Hawley Armory in Storrs, Connecticut, and were led by seventh-year head coach Don White.

== Schedule ==
Date time, TV	Rank^{#}	Opponent^{#}	Result	Record	Site (attendance) city, state
Regular Season
*		Brown	W 58–40	1–0	
		Maine	W 72–55	2–0 (1–0)	
*		Coast Guard	L 52–59	2–1	
		New Hampshire	W 51–40	3–1 (2–0)	
		Rhode Island	L 51–67	3–2 (2–1)	
		Northeastern	W 76–56	4–2 (3–1)	
*		Coast Guard	L 46–54	4–3	
*		Yale	W 50–49	5–3	
*		Springfield	L 53–61	5–4	
		New Hampshire	W 46–37	6–4 (4–1)	
		Maine	L 38–40	6–5 (4–2)	
*		Massachusetts	W 78–42	7–5	
		Rhode Island	W 82–58	8–5 (5–2)	
*		Wesleyan	L 40–42	8–6	
		Northeastern	L 46–50	8–7 (5–3)	
*Non-conference game. ^{#}Rankings from AP Poll. (#) Tournament seedings in parentheses. All times are in Eastern Time.

Schedule Source:
