= 1936–37 Connecticut State Huskies men's basketball team =

American college basketball season

1936–37 Connecticut State Huskies men's basketball
- Conference: New England Conference
- Record: 11–7 (5–3 NEC)
- Head coach: Don White (1st season)
- Home arena: Hawley Armory

1936–37 New England Conference men's basketball standings
	Conf.				Overall
Team	W		L	PCT	W		L	PCT
Rhode Island	8	–	0	1.000	18	–	3	.857
Connecticut	5	–	3	.625	11	–	7	.611
Maine	3	–	5	.375	3	–	5	.375
New Hampshire	3	–	5	.375	3	–	12	.200
Northeastern	1	–	7	.125	6	–	11	.353

The 1936–37 Connecticut State Huskies men's basketball team represented Connecticut State College, now the University of Connecticut, in the 1936–37 collegiate men's basketball season. The Huskies completed the season with an 11–7 overall record. The Huskies were members of the New England Conference, where they ended the season with a 5–3 record. The Huskies played their home games at Hawley Armory in Storrs, Connecticut, and were led by first-year head coach Don White.

== Schedule ==
Date time, TV	Rank^{#}	Opponent^{#}	Result	Record	Site (attendance) city, state
Regular Season
		Northeastern	W 42–37	1–0 (1–0)	
*		Clark	L 38–39	1–1	
*		Coast Guard	W 34–31	2–1	
*		Wesleyan	L 36–46	2–2	
*		Massachusetts	W 41–37	3–2	
		Maine	W 50–40	4–2 (2–0)	
*		Brown	L 41–43	4–3	
		New Hampshire	W 44–26	5–3 (3–0)	
*		Worcester Polytech	W 49–43	6–3	
		Rhode Island	L 41–56	6–4 (3–1)	
		Northeastern	W 59–41	7–4 (4–1)	
		New Hampshire	W 34–27	8–4 (5–1)	
		Maine	L 41–44	8–5 (5–2)	
*		Trinity	W 38–35	9–5	
		Rhode Island	L 41–65	9–6 (5–3)	
*		Trinity	L 33–40	9–7	
*		Coast Guard	W 61–20	10–7	
*		Alumni	W 60–21	11–7	
*Non-conference game. ^{#}Rankings from AP Poll. (#) Tournament seedings in parentheses. All times are in Eastern Time.

Schedule Source:
