= 1942 New Hampshire Wildcats football team =

American college football season

1942 New Hampshire Wildcats football
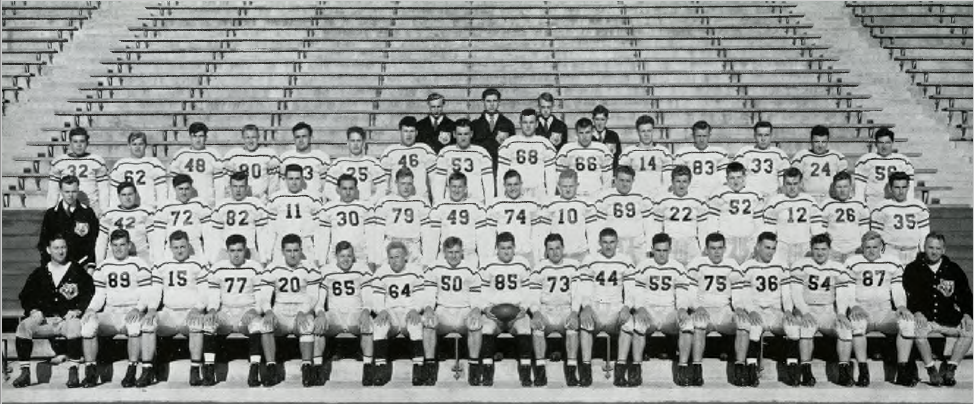
- Team photo; Theo "Tuffy" Fitanides is number 36 in the front row
- Conference: New England Conference
- Record: 6–0 (3–0 New England)
- Head coach: Charles M. Justice (1st season)
- Captain: Charles "Pappy" Judd
- Home stadium: Lewis Field

1942 New England Conference football standings
	Conf.					Overall
Team	W		L		T	W		L		T
New Hampshire +	3	–	0	–	0	6	–	0	–	0
Connecticut +	2	–	0	–	0	6	–	2	–	0
Northeastern	0	–	1	–	0	0	–	5	–	1
Rhode Island State	0	–	2	–	0	3	–	3	–	0
Maine	0	–	2	–	0	2	–	4	–	0
+ – Conference co-champions

The 1942 New Hampshire Wildcats football team was an American football team that represented the University of New Hampshire as a member of the New England Conference during the 1942 college football season. In its first year under head coach Charles M. Justice, the team compiled a 6–0 record, outscoring their opponents 101–46. The team played its home games at Lewis Field (also known as Lewis Stadium) in Durham, New Hampshire.

The team's prior head coach, George Sauer, enlisted in the Navy in April 1942. Justice, who had been the team's line coach, was named as Sauer's successor in early May.

New Hampshire was ranked at No. 197 (out of 590 college and military teams) in the final rankings under the Litkenhous Difference by Score System for 1942.

After the 1942 season, the Wildcats' football program would be idle due to World War II until a four-game limited schedule in 1944, with their next full season being 1946.

== Highlights ==
This was the Wildcats' first undefeated football season in school history. New Hampshire averaged 310 yards rushing per game, while holding their opponents to a 225-yard average, and completed 47% of their passes while holding opponents to 25% pass completion. Running back Theo "Tuffy" Fitanides gained 735 yards on 144 carries, while missing the final game of the season due to an injury sustained during military training on campus. Fitanides was later selected to captain New Hampshire's 1943 team; however, the season was cancelled due to the war. Fitanides became the first Wildcat drafted by a National Football League (NFL) team, being selected in the fifth round of the 1944 NFL draft by the New York Giants.

== Schedule ==
Date	Opponent	Site	Result	Attendance	Source
September 26	Colby*		Cancelled‡		
October 3	Bates*		Cancelled‡		
October 10	Maine	Lewis Field; Durham, NH (rivalry)	W 20–7	5,000	
October 17	Springfield*	Lewis Field; Durham, NH	W 20–7		
October 24	Rhode Island State^{†}	Lewis Field; Durham, NH	W 14–13		
October 31	at Norwich*	Sabine Field; Northfield, VT	W 16–13		
November 7	at Tufts*	Tufts Oval; Medford, MA	W 13–6		
November 14	Northeastern	Lewis Field; Durham, NH	W 18–0		
*Non-conference game; ^{†}Homecoming; Source:

‡ Games against Colby and Bates were cancelled due to an expected delay in players arriving at the university due to "working in war industries during the summer".

The 1942 game remains the last time that the New Hampshire and Norwich football programs have met.

Wildcat captain Charles Judd became a high school teacher and restaurant owner; he died in July 2006 at age 89. Tuffy Fitanides died in March 2012 at age 90.
