= 1932–33 Connecticut Aggies men's basketball team =

American college basketball season

1932–33 Connecticut Aggies men's basketball
- Conference: New England Conference
- Record: 4–12 (0–4 NEC)
- Head coach: John J. Heldman, Jr. (2nd season)
- Home arena: Hawley Armory

1932–33 New England Conference men's basketball standings
	Conf.				Overall
Team	W		L	PCT	W		L	PCT
Rhode Island	4	–	0	1.000	14	–	4	.778
New Hampshire	1	–	1	.500	10	–	5	.667
Northeastern	2	–	2	.500	9	–	7	.563
Connecticut	0	–	4	.000	4	–	12	.250

The 1932–33 Connecticut Aggies men's basketball team represented Connecticut Agricultural College, now the University of Connecticut, in the 1932–33 collegiate men's basketball season. The Aggies completed the season with a 4–12 overall record. The Aggies were members of the New England Conference, where they ended the season with a 0–4 record. The Aggies played their home games at Hawley Armory in Storrs, Connecticut, and were led by second-year head coach John J. Heldman, Jr.

== Schedule ==
Date time, TV	Rank^{#}	Opponent^{#}	Result	Record	Site (attendance) city, state
Regular Season
*		Alumni	W 33–27	1–0	
*		Upsala	W 33–22	2–0	
*		Boston University	L 25–50	2–1	
*		Brown	L 29–31	2–2	
*		Wesleyan	L 22–36	2–3	
*		Massachusetts	L 19–22	2–4	
*		Springfield	L 25–26	2–5	
		New Hampshire	L 20–27	2–6 (0–1)	
*		Tufts	L 17–36	2–7	
		Northeastern	L 21–26	2–8 (0–2)	
*		Worcester Polytech	W 29–25	3–8	
		Rhode Island	L 29–41	3–9 (0–3)	
*		Coast Guard	L 31–39	3–10	
*		Trinity	L 19–38	3–11	
*		Clark	W 63–32	4–11	
		Rhode Island	L 34–41	4–12 (0–4)	
*Non-conference game. ^{#}Rankings from AP Poll. (#) Tournament seedings in parentheses. All times are in Eastern Time.

Schedule Source:
