= 1968–69 Connecticut Huskies men's basketball team =

American college basketball season

1968–69 Connecticut Huskies men's basketball
- Conference: Yankee Conference
- Record: 5–19 (3–7 YC)
- Head coach: Burr Carlson (2nd season)
- Assistant coach: Jack Coniam
- Home arena: Hugh S. Greer Field House

1968–69 Yankee Conference men's basketball standings
	Conf.				Overall
Team	W		L	PCT	W		L	PCT
Massachusetts	9	–	1	.900	17	–	7	.708
Rhode Island	7	–	3	.700	10	–	15	.400
Maine	5	–	5	.500	10	–	13	.435
Vermont	3	–	7	.300	14	–	11	.560
New Hampshire	3	–	7	.300	9	–	15	.375
Connecticut	3	–	7	.300	5	–	19	.208

The 1968–69 Connecticut Huskies men's basketball team represented the University of Connecticut in the 1968–69 collegiate men's basketball season. The Huskies completed the season with a 5–19 overall record. The Huskies were members of the Yankee Conference, where they ended the season with a 3–7 record. The Huskies played their home games at Hugh S. Greer Field House in Storrs, Connecticut, and were led by second-year head coach Burr Carlson.

== Schedule ==
Date time, TV	Rank^{#}	Opponent^{#}	Result	Record	Site (attendance) city, state
Regular Season
11/30/1968*		at Yale	L 70–89	0–1	Payne Whitney Gymnasium; New Haven, CT
12/7/1968*		at Boston College	L 75–105	0–2	Roberts Center; Boston, MA
12/13/1968		at New Hampshire	L 78–97	0–3 (0–1)	Lundholm Gym; Durham, NH
12/14/1968*		Fordham	L 55–66	0–4	Hugh S. Greer Field House; Storrs, CT
12/17/1968		Massachusetts	L 66–80	0–5 (0–2)	Hugh S. Greer Field House; Storrs, CT
12/21/1968*		Holy Cross	L 63–67	0–6	Hugh S. Greer Field House; Storrs, CT
12/28/1968*		at San Jose State	L 83–96	0–7	City National Civic; San Jose, CA
12/30/1968*		at UC Santa Barbara	L 70–84	0–8	Robertson Gymnasium; Santa Barbara, CA
1/1/1969*		at Utah	L 85–105	0–9	Nielsen Fieldhouse; Salt Lake City, UT
1/4/1969*		Dartmouth	L 62–74	0–10	Hugh S. Greer Field House; Storrs, CT
1/8/1969*		Syracuse; Rivalry	W 103–84	1–10	Hugh S. Greer Field House; Storrs, CT
1/11/1969		Rhode Island	W 102–92	2–10 (1–2)	Hugh S. Greer Field House; Storrs, CT
1/23/1969		at Vermont	L 87–99	2–11 (1–3)	Patrick Gym; Burlington, VT
1/25/1969*		Manhattan	L 78–93	2–12	Hugh S. Greer Field House; Storrs, CT
2/1/1969		Vermont	W 96–78	3–12 (2–3)	Hugh S. Greer Field House; Storrs, CT
2/4/1969*		at Seton Hall	L 79–81	3–13	Walsh Gymnasium; South Orange, NJ
2/8/1969		at Maine	L 88–116	3–14 (2–4)	Memorial Gymnasium; Orono, ME
2/11/1969*		Boston University	W 74–72	4–14	Hugh S. Greer Field House; Storrs, CT
2/15/1969		at Massachusetts	L 70–85	4–15 (2–5)	Curry Hicks Cage; Amherst, MA
2/17/1969		Maine	L 70–84	4–16 (2–6)	Hugh S. Greer Field House; Storrs, CT
2/19/1969		New Hampshire	W 88–84	5–16 (3–6)	Hugh S. Greer Field House; Storrs, CT
2/22/1969*		at Long Island	L 46–86	5–17	Paramount Theatre; Brooklyn, NY
2/25/1969*		Rutgers	L 79–81	5–18	Hugh S. Greer Field House; Storrs, CT
3/1/1969		at Rhode Island	L 72–92	5–19 (3–7)	Keaney Gymnasium; Kingston, RI
*Non-conference game. ^{#}Rankings from AP Poll. (#) Tournament seedings in parentheses. All times are in Eastern Time.

Schedule Source:
