= 1945 Rhode Island State Rams football team =

American college football season

1945 Rhode Island State Rams football

New England co-champion
- Conference: New England Conference
- Record: 2–1 (1–0 New England)
- Head coach: Paul Cieurzo (2nd season)
- Home stadium: Meade Stadium

1945 New England Conference football standings
	Conf.					Overall
Team	W		L		T	W		L		T
Connecticut +	2	–	0	–	0	7	–	1	–	0
Rhode Island State +	1	–	0	–	0	2	–	1	–	0
Maine	0	–	3	–	0	0	–	5	–	0
+ – Conference co-champions

The 1945 Rhode Island Rams football team was an American football team that represented Rhode Island State College (later renamed the University of Rhode Island) as a member of the New England Conference during the 1945 college football season. In its second season under head coach Paul Cieurzo, the team compiled a 2–1 record (1–0 against conference opponents) and tied for the conference championship. The team played its home games at Meade Stadium in Kingston, Rhode Island.

== Schedule ==
Date	Opponent	Site	Result	Source
October 13	at Maine	Alumni Field; Orono, ME	W 10–7	
October 20	at Rutgers*	Rutgers Stadium; New Brunswick, NJ	L 7–39	
November 3	Boston University*	Meade Stadium; Kingston, RI	W 30–0	
*Non-conference game
