= 1941–42 Connecticut Huskies men's basketball team =

American college basketball season

1941–42 Connecticut Huskies men's basketball
- Conference: New England Conference
- Record: 12–5 (6–2 NEC)
- Head coach: Don White (6th season)
- Home arena: Hawley Armory

1941–42 New England Conference men's basketball standings
| | Conf. | | | | Overall |
| Team | W | | L | PCT | W | | L | PCT |
|---|---|---|---|---|---|---|---|---|
| Rhode Island State | 8 | – | 0 | 1.000 | 18 | – | 4 | .818 |
| Connecticut | 6 | – | 2 | .750 | 12 | – | 5 | .706 |
| Northeastern | 4 | – | 4 | .500 | 6 | – | 9 | .400 |
| Maine | 2 | – | 6 | .250 | 7 | – | 7 | .500 |
| New Hampshire | 0 | – | 8 | .000 | 4 | – | 15 | .211 |

The 1941–42 Connecticut Huskies men's basketball team represented University of Connecticut in the 1941–42 collegiate men's basketball season. The Huskies completed the season with a 12–5 overall record. The Huskies were members of the New England Conference, where they ended the season with a 6–2 record. The Huskies played their home games at Hawley Armory in Storrs, Connecticut, and were led by sixth-year head coach Don White.

== Schedule ==
| Date time, TV | Rank^{#} | Opponent^{#} | Result | Record | Site (attendance) city, state |
Regular Season
| * | | Brown | L 48–50 | 0–1 | |
| * | | Springfield | W 57–47 | 1–1 | |
| * | | St. Lawrence | L 39–41 | 1–2 | |
| | | Maine | W 58–45 | 2–2 (1–0) | |
| * | | Coast Guard | W 60–46 | 3–2 | |
| | | New Hampshire | W 57–36 | 4–2 (2–0) | |
| | | Rhode Island | L 59–66 | 4–3 (2–1) | |
| * | | Coast Guard | W 37–31 | 5–3 | |
| | | Maine | W 47–39 | 6–3 (3–1) | |
| | | New Hampshire | W 69–53 | 7–3 (4–1) | |
| * | | Yale | L 48–53 | 7–4 | |
| | | Northeastern | W 66–34 | 8–4 (5–1) | |
| * | | Worcester Polytech | W 69–55 | 9–4 | |
| * | | Massachusetts | W 46–40 | 10–4 | |
| | | Rhode Island | L 68–87 | 10–5 (5–2) | |
| * | | Wesleyan | W 66–44 | 11–5 | |
| | | Northeastern | W 58–29 | 12–5 (6–2) | |
*Non-conference game. ^{#}Rankings from AP Poll. (#) Tournament seedings in parentheses. All times are in Eastern Time.

Schedule Source:
