= 1923–24 Connecticut Aggies men's basketball team =

American college basketball season

1923–24 Connecticut Aggies men's basketball
- Conference: New England Conference
- Record: 4–8 (1–2 NEC)
- Head coach: Sumner A. Dole (1st season)
- Home arena: Hawley Armory

1923–24 New England Conference men's basketball standings
| | Conf. | | | | Overall |
| Team | W | | L | PCT | W | | L | PCT |
|---|---|---|---|---|---|---|---|---|
| New Hampshire | 2 | – | 1 | .667 | 12 | – | 2 | .857 |
| Rhode Island | 2 | – | 1 | .667 | 9 | – | 6 | .600 |
| Maine | 1 | – | 2 | .333 | 9 | – | 6 | .600 |
| Connecticut | 1 | – | 2 | .333 | 4 | – | 8 | .333 |

The 1923–24 Connecticut Aggies men's basketball team represented Connecticut Agricultural College, now the University of Connecticut, in the 1923–24 collegiate men's basketball season. The Aggies completed the season with a 4–8 overall record. The Aggies were members of the New England Conference, where they ended the season with a 1–2 record. The Aggies played their home games at Hawley Armory in Storrs, Connecticut, and were led by first-year head coach Sumner A. Dole.

== Schedule ==
| Date time, TV | Rank^{#} | Opponent^{#} | Result | Record | Site (attendance) city, state |
Regular Season
| | | New Hampshire | L 21–35 | 0–1 (0–1) | |
| * | | Springfield | L 24–35 | 0–2 | |
| * | | Wesleyan | L 21–41 | 0–3 | |
| * | | Tufts | L 25–38 | 0–4 | |
| * | | Trinity | W 22–13 | 1–4 | |
| * | | Army | L 15–17 | 1–5 | |
| * | | Springfield | L 13–34 | 1–6 | |
| * | | St. Michael's | W 35–16 | 2–6 | |
| * | | Massachusetts | L 18–23 | 2–7 | |
| * | | Trinity | W 38–21 | 3–7 | |
| | | Rhode Island | W 42–22 | 4–7 (1–1) | |
| | | Rhode Island | L 28–31 | 4–8 (1–2) | |
*Non-conference game. ^{#}Rankings from AP Poll. (#) Tournament seedings in parentheses. All times are in Eastern Time.

Schedule Source:
