= Donald White (basketball) =

American basketball player and coach

Personal information
- Born: April 22, 1898 Lebanon, Indiana, U.S.
- Died: July 12, 1983 (aged 85) Kosciusko County, Indiana, U.S.

Career information
- High school: Lebanon (Lebanon, Indiana)
- College: Purdue (1918–1921)
- Position: Guard
- Coaching career: 1923–1963

Career history

Coaching
- 1923–1935: Washington University
- 1936–1945: Connecticut
- 1945–1956, 1962–1963: Rutgers
- 1956: Thailand national team

Career highlights
- As player: Helms All-American (1921); 2× First-team All-Big Ten (1920, 1921); As coach: 3× MVC champion (1929–1931); NEC champion (1941); 3× Middle Three champion (1949–1951)

Donald S. White (April 22, 1898 – July 12, 1983) was an American college basketball player and coach. Raised in Lebanon, Indiana, White was a standout basketball player at Lebanon High School and led them to consecutive state championships in 1917 and 1918. He attended Purdue University and played for their basketball and baseball teams. As a senior in 1920–21, White led the Western Conference (now known as the Big Ten Conference) in scoring and his Boilermakers to a conference championship. He was named first-team all-Western Conference and was also declared a consensus All-American by the Helms Athletic Foundation.

White became a head coach after his playing days. He served as head coach at Washington University in St. Louis, the University of Connecticut, and Rutgers University. He won or tied seven conference regular season championships throughout his career: three at Washington University, one at Connecticut, and three at Rutgers. White compiled an overall career record of 301–332.

Internationally, White was chosen by the U.S. State Department to establish a basketball program in Thailand. He was the national basketball team head coach in the 1956 Summer Olympics, placing 15th out of 15 squads.

== Head coaching record ==
Record table
Season	Team	Overall	Conference	Standing	Postseason
Washington University Bears (Missouri Valley Conference) (1923–1935)
1923–24	Washington University	10–9	8–8	4th	
1924–25	Washington University	10–8	10–6	3rd	
1925–26	Washington University	7–9	7–9	6th	
1926–27	Washington University	5–10	2–8	9th	
1927–28	Washington University	10–12	8–10	5th	
1928–29	Washington University	11–7	7–0	1st	
1929–30	Washington University	8–8	6–2	1st	
1930–31	Washington University	6–12	5–3	1st	
1931–32	Washington University	10–9	3–5	3rd	
1932–33	Washington University	11–6	5–5	3rd	
1933–34	Washington University	7–11	4–6	4th	
1934–35	Washington University	7–11	6–6	4th	
Washington University:		102–112 (.477)	71–68 (.511)		
Connecticut Huskies (Independent) (1936–1937)
1936–37	Connecticut	11–7			
Connecticut Huskies (New England Conference) (1937–1943)
1937–38	Connecticut	13–5	4–4	2nd	
1938–39	Connecticut	12–6	6–2	2nd	
1939–40	Connecticut	9–7	6–2	2nd	
1940–41	Connecticut	14–2	7–1	1st	
1941–42	Connecticut	12–5	6–2	2nd	
1942–43	Connecticut	8–7	5–3	2nd	
Connecticut Huskies (Independent) (1943–1945)
1943–44	Connecticut	10–9			
1944–45	Connecticut	5–11			
Connecticut:		94–59 (.614)	34–14 (.708)		
Rutgers Scarlet Knights (Independent) (1945–1948)
1945–46	Rutgers	13–7			
1946–47	Rutgers	7–12			
1947–48	Rutgers	14–9			
Rutgers Scarlet Knights (Middle Three Conference) (1948–1952)
1948–49	Rutgers	14–12	3–1	1st	
1949–50	Rutgers	13–15	3–1	1st	
1950–51	Rutgers	7–14	3–1	1st	
1951–52	Rutgers	6–13	1–2	2nd	
Rutgers Scarlet Knights (Independent) (1952–1956)
1952–53	Rutgers	8–13			
1953–54	Rutgers	11–13			
1954–55	Rutgers	2–22			
1955–56	Rutgers	3–15			
Rutgers Scarlet Knights (Independent) (1962–1963)
1962–63	Rutgers	7–16			
Rutgers:		105–161 (.395)	10–5 (.667)		
Total:		301–332 (.476)			
National champion Postseason invitational champion Conference regular season champion Conference regular season and conference tournament champion Division regular season champion Division regular season and conference tournament champion Conference tournament champion
