= 1943–44 Connecticut Huskies men's basketball team =

American college basketball season

1943–44 Connecticut Huskies men's basketball

New England Conference Regular Season Champions
- Conference: New England Conference
- Record: 10–9 (6–0 NEC)
- Head coach: Don White (8th season)
- Home arena: Hawley Armory

1943–44 New England Conference men's basketball standings
	Conf.				Overall
Team	W		L	PCT	W		L	PCT
Connecticut	6	–	0	1.000	10	–	9	.526
Rhode Island State	4	–	2	.667	14	–	6	.700
Northeastern	1	–	5	.167	8	–	8	.500
Maine	1	–	5	.167	4	–	6	.400

The 1943–44 Connecticut Huskies men's basketball team represented University of Connecticut in the 1943–44 collegiate men's basketball season. The Huskies completed the season with a 10–9 overall record. The Huskies were members of the New England Conference, where they ended the season with a 6–0 record. The Huskies played their home games at Hawley Armory in Storrs, Connecticut, and were led by eighth-year head coach Don White.

== Schedule ==
Date time, TV	Rank^{#}	Opponent^{#}	Result	Record	Site (attendance) city, state
Regular Season
*		Boston Coast Guard	L 47–57	0–1	
*		Wesleyan	W 49–25	1–1	
*		Brown	L 53–60	1–2	
*		Worcester Polytech	W 48–36	2–2	
*		Wesleyan	W 42–33	3–2	
*		Colgate	L 36–64	3–3	
*		Cornell	L 35–64	3–4	
*		New York University	L 45–46	3–5	
		Maine	W 50–22	4–5 (1–0)	
		Rhode Island	W 67–61	5–5 (2–0)	
*		Coast Guard	L 42–61	5–6	
*		Yale	L 33–41	5–7	
		Northeastern	W 59–41	6–7 (3–0)	
		Maine	W 73–48	7–7 (4–0)	
*		Yale	L 35–46	7–8	
*		Coast Guard	L 37–59	7–9	
		Northeastern	W 70–37	8–9 (5–0)	
*		Brown	W 69–44	9–9	
		Rhode Island	W 65–61	10–9	
*Non-conference game. ^{#}Rankings from AP Poll. (#) Tournament seedings in parentheses. All times are in Eastern Time.

Schedule Source:
