= 1927–28 Connecticut Aggies men's basketball team =

American college basketball season

1927–28 Connecticut Aggies men's basketball

New England Conference Regular Season Champions
- Conference: New England Conference
- Record: 11–3 (3–1 NEC)
- Head coach: Louis Alexander (1st season)
- Home arena: Hawley Armory

1927–28 New England Conference men's basketball standings
	Conf.				Overall
Team	W		L	PCT	W		L	PCT
Connecticut	3	–	1	.750	11	–	3	.786
Rhode Island	4	–	2	.667	15	–	5	.750
Maine	1	–	2	.333	4	–	6	.400
New Hampshire	1	–	2	.333	5	–	8	.385
Northeastern	0	–	2	.000	6	–	11	.353

The 1927–28 Connecticut Aggies men's basketball team represented Connecticut Agricultural College, now the University of Connecticut, in the 1927–28 collegiate men's basketball season. The Aggies completed the season with an 11–3 overall record. The Aggies were members of the New England Conference, where they ended the season with a 3–1 record. The Aggies played their home games at Hawley Armory in Storrs, Connecticut, and were led by first-year head coach Louis Alexander.

== Schedule ==
Date time, TV	Rank^{#}	Opponent^{#}	Result	Record	Site (attendance) city, state
Regular Season
*		Tufts	W 37–22	1–0	
*		Coast Guard	W 64–23	2–0	
		Maine	L 21–34	2–1 (0–1)	
*		Providence	W 29–21	3–1	
*		Holy Cross	L 27–36	3–2	
*		Vermont	L 28–45	3–3	
		New Hampshire	W 51–29	4–3 (1–1)	
		Rhode Island	W 38–27	5–3 (2–1)	
*		Holy Cross	W 46–33	6–3	
*		Norwich	W 39–17	7–3	
		Rhode Island	W 41–34	8–3 (3–1)	
*		Springfield	W 39–36	9–3	
*		Trinity	W 31–24	10–3	
*		Brown	W 29–21	11–3	
*Non-conference game. ^{#}Rankings from AP Poll. (#) Tournament seedings in parentheses. All times are in Eastern Time.

Schedule Source:
