= Dee Rowe =

American basketball coach (1929–2021)

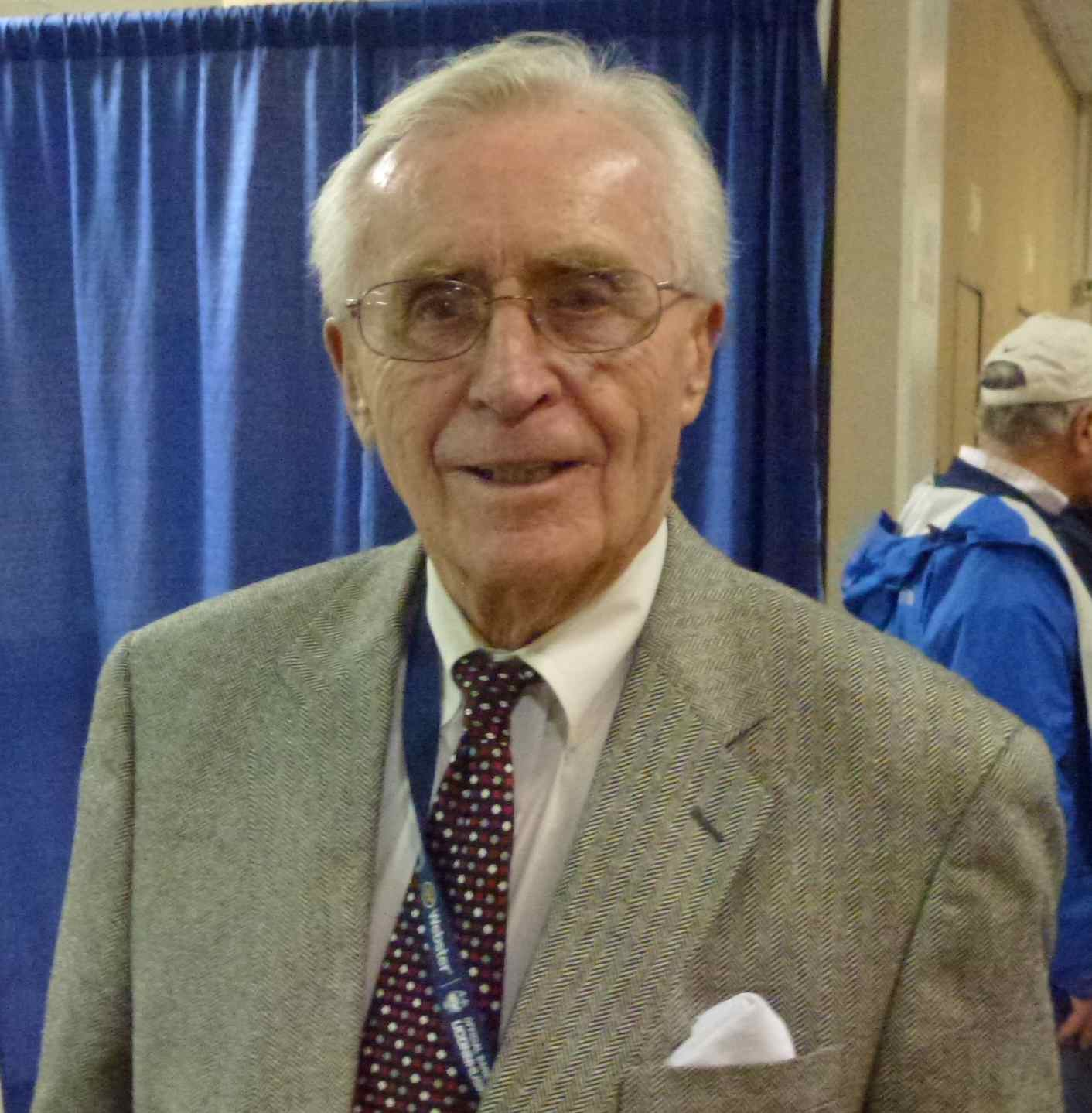

Biographical details
- Born: December 22, 1929; Worcester, Massachusetts, U.S.
- Died: January 10, 2021 (aged 91); Storrs, Connecticut, U.S.

Playing career
- 1949–1952: Middlebury

Coaching career (HC unless noted)
- 1955–1969: Worcester Academy
- 1969–1977: Connecticut

Administrative career (AD unless noted)
- 1955–1969: Worcester Academy
- 1977–1992: Connecticut (asso. AD)

Head coaching record
- Overall: 120–88 (.577)

Donald Rowe (December 22, 1929 – January 10, 2021) was an American college basketball coach. He coached for the UConn Huskies men's team and was a university Athletics Ambassador, fundraising for college athletic programs.

== Early life ==
Rowe was born in Worcester, Massachusetts, and graduated from Worcester Academy in 1947.

== Coaching ==
After graduating from Middlebury College, where he played on the men's basketball team, and serving in the U. S. Army, Rowe returned to Worcester Academy the fall of 1955 as the athletic director and head basketball coach. He quickly built the athletic program into a power in the New England prep school interscholastic athletics and, in addition, his basketball teams won the New England Prep School Championship nine times. He served as the director of athletics and the head coach of both the men's basketball and baseball teams for 13 years, from 1955 to 1969.

In the spring of 1969, Rowe was hired as the men's head coach at the University of Connecticut, and he headed the Huskies program from 1969 until 1977. From 1972 to 1977, UConn had winning seasons with one NCAA appearance reaching the final 16, two NIT appearances, and three ECAC tournament appearances with one championship. He was named the New England coach of the year in both 1970 and 1976.

== Administration ==
Rowe retired from coaching following the 1976–77 season to become UConn's associate athletic director for development and director of the university's athletic development fund. He participated in the search committees that brought Hall of Fame coaches Jim Calhoun (men's basketball) and Geno Auriemma (women's basketball) to Connecticut. He also played an instrumental role in the foundation of the Big East conference. Rowe was the architect of the fundraising arm for UConn athletics, which over the course of 13 years raised millions of dollars for a variety of projects including the building of the Harry A. Gampel Pavilion. He served as interim athletic director in 1990. He retired in December 1991.

== Olympics ==
In 1980, Dave Gavitt appointed Rowe to be an assistant coach of the U.S. Olympic men's basketball team. He was unable to participate due to the US boycott of the 1980 Olympics. Rowe had a framed picture of the 1980 United States Olympic men's basketball team hanging on his office wall. Although he publicly expressed concern for other athletes, such as soccer players and track athletes who were unlikely to have sports careers after the Olympics, others knew the cancellation of the trip was important to him. Geno Auriemma, the Connecticut women's basketball coach, often visited Rowe in his office and saw the picture every time. In 2010, Auriemma was named the head coach of the USA women's basketball team, scheduled to compete in several events, including the 2012 Olympics. In 2010, Auriemma was honored at the Winged Foot Club in New York City to receive an award. Rowe was the individual who "presented" Auriemma. As part of Auriemma's acceptance speech, Geno talked about Rowe's disappointment, and said he hoped to take Rowe with him. Rowe remembered hearing it at the time, but the discussion didn't come up again until 2012. As they were making preparations for the Olympics, Auriemma was trying to find a way to bring Rowe along. Auriemma could bring his team and staff members, but Rowe was not part of the USA Basketball staff. He spoke to Warde Manuel, the Connecticut athletic director, and proposed that Rowe be named a university ambassador. There were approximately 250 UConn alumni planning to make the trip, so Rowe could serve as the person to represent the school. The athletic director and Susan Herbst, the school president, supported the idea, so Dee Rowe was able to attend the Olympics in an official capacity.

== Personal life and death ==
He married his college girlfriend, Virginia (Ginny) Bradford Reynolds in 1954. They had seven children.

Rowe had dementia and died from COVID-19 and Waldenstrom macroglobulinemia at his home in Storrs, Connecticut, on January 10, 2021. He was 91.

== Head coaching record ==
Record table
Season	Team	Overall	Conference	Standing	Postseason
Connecticut Huskies (Yankee Conference) (1969–1976)
1969–70	Connecticut	14–9	8–2	T–1st	
1970–71	Connecticut	10–14	5–5	3rd	
1971–72	Connecticut	8–17	5–5	T–4th	
1972–73	Connecticut	15–10	9–3	2nd	
1973–74	Connecticut	19–8	9–3	2nd	NIT Quarterfinals
1974–75	Connecticut	18–10	9–3	2nd	NIT First Round
1975–76	Connecticut	19–10	7–5	T–2nd	NCAA Sweet Sixteen
Connecticut:		103–78 (.569)	52–26 (.667)		
Connecticut Huskies (Independent) (1976–1977)
1976–77	Connecticut	17–10			
Connecticut:		17–10 (.630)			
Total:		120–88 (.577)			
National champion Postseason invitational champion Conference regular season champion Conference regular season and conference tournament champion Division regular season champion Division regular season and conference tournament champion Conference tournament champion
