= Louis Alexander =

American college athletics coach and administrator (1899–1976)

Biographical details
- Born: December 7, 1899; Ansonia, Connecticut, U.S.
- Died: May 6, 1976 (aged 76); Rochester, New York, U.S.
- Education: Connecticut Agricultural College

Coaching career (HC unless noted)

Men's basketball
- 1923–1927: Connecticut (freshmen)
- 1927–1930: Connecticut
- 1931–1957: Rochester

Baseball
- 1924–1931: Connecticut (freshmen)
- 1935–1959: Rochester

Administrative career (AD unless noted)
- 1939–1966: Rochester

Head coaching record
- Overall: 282–156 (.644) (basketball); 90–72 (.556) (baseball)

Accomplishments and honors

Championships
- 1x New England Conference basketball champion (1927–28)

Louis Albion Alexander (December 7, 1899 – May 6, 1976) was an American coach and administrator who was the head coach of the UConn Huskies men's basketball team from 1927 to 1931. He then spent 35 years at the University of Rochester, where he was the men's basketball coach (1931–1957), baseball coach (1934–1959), and director of athletics (1939–1966).

== Early life ==
Alexander was born in Ansonia, Connecticut and was a three sport athlete at Crosby High School in Waterbury, Connecticut. He helped lead the school to state titles in basketball and baseball. He played basketball, football, and baseball at the Connecticut Agricultural College. He was a two-time All-New England selection in basketball.

== Connecticut ==
Alexander graduated from CAC in 1923, but remained with the college as coach of the Aggies' freshman football, basketball, and baseball teams, secretary of the alumni association, and faculty advisor to the student senate. He coached the varsity football team for the first five games of the 1927 season while head coach Sumner Dole was recovering from appendicitis. In 1927, he became head coach of the varsity basketball team. The Aggies won the New England Conference title in his first season as head coach. He missed part of the 1930–31 season because he was studying at the Teachers College, Columbia University. His overall record as basketball coach was 35–19.

== Rochester ==
In 1931, Alexander left Connecticut to accept a position with the physical education department at the University of Rochester. He was the head basketball coach from 1931 to 1957 and compiled a 247–137 record. He led the Yellowjackets to upset victories over Michigan and Dartmouth in 1939–40 and Syracuse in 1940–41. His 1941–42 team went 16–0 and beat Yale, Michigan State, Princeton, and Colgate. The following season, the Yellowjackets upset Ohio State. During the 1949–50 season, he coached all three of his sons – Lou Jr., Neil, and Rogers. Alexander was elected to the Helms Athletic Foundation's basketball Hall of Fame in 1963.

Alexander was Rochester's head baseball coach from 1935 to 1959. His overall record was 90–72.

Alexander became Rochester's acting athletic director in September 1939 when Edward Fauver took a leave of absence. He officially succeeded Fauver on January 28, 1942. In 1945, he was appointed chairman of the department of physical education. He retired at the end of the 1965–66 academic year. In 1968, the University of Rochester Palestra was renamed the Louis Alexander Palestra in Alexander's honor.

== Personal life ==
Alexander met his wife, Anna, while they were students at Connecticut. They had three sons and a daughter. Alexander coached all three of his sons at Rochester. Lou Jr. and Neil were both inducted into the university's athletic hall of fame. Lou Jr. followed in his father's footsteps – coaching the Rochester Institute of Technology's basketball team for 12 seasons and serving as the university's athletic director from 1959 to 1977. Rogers died from self-inflicted gunshot wound on February 27, 1960, but the coroner could not determine if it was an accident or suicide. Anna Alexander died from cancer on November 23, 1963.

== Death ==
Alexander died on May 6, 1976 at Strong Memorial Hospital. He was 76 years old.
