= 1972–73 Connecticut Huskies men's basketball team =

American college basketball season

1972–73 Connecticut Huskies men's basketball
- Conference: Yankee Conference
- Record: 15–10 (9–3 YC)
- Head coach: Dee Rowe (4th season)
- Assistant coaches: Steven F. Bell; Dom Perno; Bob Staak
- Home arena: Hugh S. Greer Field House

1972–73 Yankee Conference men's basketball standings
	Conf.				Overall
Team	W		L	PCT	W		L	PCT
Massachusetts	10	–	2	.833	20	–	7	.741
Connecticut	9	–	3	.750	15	–	10	.600
Boston University	7	–	4	.636	15	–	10	.600
Maine	6	–	6	.500	13	–	10	.565
Rhode Island	5	–	6	.455	7	–	18	.280
New Hampshire	2	–	10	.167	11	–	15	.423
Vermont	2	–	10	.167	7	–	17	.292

The 1972–73 Connecticut Huskies men's basketball team represented the University of Connecticut in the 1972–73 collegiate men's basketball season. The Huskies completed the season with a 15–10 overall record. The Huskies were members of the Yankee Conference, where they ended the season with a 9–3 record. The Huskies played their home games at Hugh S. Greer Field House in Storrs, Connecticut, and were led by fourth-year head coach Dee Rowe.

== Schedule ==
Date time, TV	Rank^{#}	Opponent^{#}	Result	Record	Site (attendance) city, state
Regular Season
12/2/1972*		at Yale	W 92–71	1–0	Payne Whitney Gymnasium; New Haven, CT
12/6/1972*		Holy Cross	L 90–96	1–1	Hugh S. Greer Field House; Storrs, CT
12/9/1972*		Rutgers	L 72–86	1–2	Hugh S. Greer Field House; Storrs, CT
12/12/1972		Massachusetts	W 71–68	2–2 (1–0)	Hugh S. Greer Field House; Storrs, CT
12/16/1972*		at Columbia	W 71–62	3–2	University Heights Gymnasium; New York, NY
12/22/1972*		Harvard; Connecticut Classic	L 70–80	3–3	Hugh S. Greer Field House; Storrs, CT
12/23/1972*		Syracuse; Connecticut Classic/Rivalry	L 73–104	3–4	Hugh S. Greer Field House; Storrs, CT
1/3/1973		at New Hampshire	W 60–59	4–4 (2–0)	Lundholm Gym; Durham, NH
1/6/1973*		at Florida State	L 55–91	4–5	Tully Gymnasium; Tallahassee, FL
1/9/1973*		at Florida Southern	L 85–93	4–6	Jenkins Field House; Lakeland, FL
1/11/1973*		at South Florida	W 84–67	5–6	Tampa, FL
1/13/1973*		Georgetown; Rivalry	W 78–64	6–6	Hugh S. Greer Field House; Storrs, CT
1/20/1973		Rhode Island	W 74–72	7–6 (3–0)	Hugh S. Greer Field House; Storrs, CT
1/24/1973*		Dartmouth	W 97–78	8–6	Hugh S. Greer Field House; Storrs, CT
1/27/1973		at Vermont	W 104–74	9–6 (4–0)	Patrick Gym; Burlington, VT
2/3/1973		Maine	W 98–81	10–6 (5–0)	Hugh S. Greer Field House; Storrs, CT
2/7/1973		at Boston University	L 99–107	10–7 (5–1)	Case Gym; Boston, MA
2/10/1973		at Massachusetts	L 67–83	10–8 (5–2)	Curry Hicks Cage; Amherst, MA
2/13/1973		New Hampshire	W 81–69	11–8 (6–2)	Hugh S. Greer Field House; Storrs, CT
2/15/1973		Vermont	W 88–46	12–8 (7–2)	Hugh S. Greer Field House; Storrs, CT
2/17/1973		at Maine	L 105–110 ^{OT}	12–9 (7–3)	Memorial Gymnasium; Orono, ME
2/22/1973*		at Manhattan	L 87–97	12–10	New York, NY
2/24/1973		at Rhode Island	W 91–77	13–10 (8–3)	Keaney Gymnasium; Kingston, RI
2/27/1973*		at Boston College	W 66–65	14–10	Roberts Center; Boston, MA
3/3/1973		Boston University	W 66–53	15–10 (9–3)	Hugh S. Greer Field House; Storrs, CT
*Non-conference game. ^{#}Rankings from AP Poll. (#) Tournament seedings in parentheses. All times are in Eastern Time.

Schedule Source:
