= 1924–25 Connecticut Aggies men's basketball team =

American college basketball season

1924–25 Connecticut Aggies men's basketball

New England Conference Regular Season Champions
- Conference: New England Conference
- Record: 10–4 (3–0 NEC)
- Head coach: Sumner A. Dole (2nd season)
- Home arena: Hawley Armory

1924–25 New England Conference men's basketball standings
	Conf.				Overall
Team	W		L	PCT	W		L	PCT
Connecticut	3	–	0	1.000	10	–	4	.714
New Hampshire	2	–	1	.667	11	–	3	.786
Rhode Island	3	–	2	.600	11	–	5	.688
Northeastern	0	–	2	.000	5	–	12	.294
Maine	0	–	3	.000	4	–	10	.286

The 1924–25 Connecticut Aggies men's basketball team represented Connecticut Agricultural College, now the University of Connecticut, in the 1924–25 collegiate men's basketball season. The Aggies completed the season with a 10–4 overall record. The Aggies were members of the New England Conference, where they ended the season with a 3–0 record. The Aggies played their home games at Hawley Armory in Storrs, Connecticut, and were led by second-year head coach Sumner A. Dole.

== Schedule ==
Date time, TV	Rank^{#}	Opponent^{#}	Result	Record	Site (attendance) city, state
Regular Season
		New Hampshire	W 22–18	1–0 (1–0)	
*		Springfield	W 26–16	2–0	
*		Wesleyan	L 26–31	2–1	
*		Trinity	W 50–23	3–1	
*		Army	L 29–30	3–2	
*		Springfield	W 28–13	4–2	
*		Clark	W 42–26	5–2	
*		St. Michael's	W 52–22	6–2	
*		Massachusetts	L 18–20	6–3	
*		Holy Cross	W 29–21	7–3	
*		Trinity	W 44–22	8–3	
		Rhode Island	W 38–26	9–3 (2–0)	
*		Harvard	L 26–34	9–4	
		Rhode Island	W 38–27	10–4 (3–0)	
*Non-conference game. ^{#}Rankings from AP Poll. (#) Tournament seedings in parentheses. All times are in Eastern Time.

Schedule Source:
