= 1940–41 Connecticut Huskies men's basketball team =

American college basketball season

1940–41 Connecticut Huskies men's basketball

New England Conference Regular Season Co-Champions
- Conference: New England Conference
- Record: 14–2 (7–1 NEC)
- Head coach: Don White (5th season)
- Home arena: Hawley Armory

1940–41 New England Conference men's basketball standings
| | Conf. | | | | Overall |
| Team | W | | L | PCT | W | | L | PCT |
|---|---|---|---|---|---|---|---|---|
| Connecticut | 7 | – | 1 | .875 | 14 | – | 2 | .875 |
| Rhode Island State | 7 | – | 1 | .875 | 21 | – | 4 | .840 |
| New Hampshire | 3 | – | 5 | .375 | 10 | – | 8 | .556 |
| Maine | 2 | – | 6 | .250 | 4 | – | 8 | .333 |
| Northeastern | 1 | – | 7 | .125 | 3 | – | 13 | .188 |

The 1940–41 Connecticut Huskies men's basketball team represented University of Connecticut in the 1940–41 collegiate men's basketball season. The Huskies completed the season with a 14–2 overall record. The Huskies were members of the New England Conference, where they ended the season with a 7–1 record. The Huskies played their home games at Hawley Armory in Storrs, Connecticut, and were led by fifth-year head coach Don White.

== Schedule ==
| Date time, TV | Rank^{#} | Opponent^{#} | Result | Record | Site (attendance) city, state |
Regular Season
| * | | Springfield | W 47–44 | 1–0 | |
| * | | Brown | W 42–36 | 2–0 | |
| | | Maine | W 80–51 | 3–0 (1–0) | |
| * | | Coast Guard | W 65–38 | 4–0 | |
| | | Rhode Island | L 61–79 | 4–1 (1–1) | |
| * | | Villanova | L 35–40 | 4–2 | |
| | | New Hampshire | W 78–47 | 5–2 (2–1) | |
| | | Maine | W 53–46 | 6–2 (3–1) | |
| | | Northeastern | W 71–24 | 7–2 (4–1) | |
| | | New Hampshire | W 70–50 | 8–2 (5–1) | |
| * | | Maryland | W 52–43 | 9–2 | |
| * | | Massachusetts | W 57–37 | 10–2 | |
| | | Rhode Island | W 63–62 | 11–2 (6–1) | |
| * | | Worcester Polytech | W 58–37 | 12–2 | |
| | | Northeastern | W 79–36 | 13–2 (7–1) | |
| * | | Wesleyan | W 57–42 | 14–2 | |
*Non-conference game. ^{#}Rankings from AP Poll. (#) Tournament seedings in parentheses. All times are in Eastern Time.

Schedule Source:
