= 1925–26 Connecticut Aggies men's basketball team =

American college basketball season

1925–26 Connecticut Aggies men's basketball

New England Conference Regular Season Champions
- Conference: New England Conference
- Record: 11–3 (3–1 NEC)
- Head coach: Sumner A. Dole (3rd season)
- Home arena: Hawley Armory

1925–26 New England Conference men's basketball standings
	Conf.				Overall
Team	W		L	PCT	W		L	PCT
Connecticut	3	–	1	.750	11	–	3	.786
New Hampshire	2	–	1	.667	11	–	4	.733
Rhode Island	3	–	2	.600	8	–	8	.500
Northeastern	1	–	1	.500	8	–	7	.533
Maine	0	–	4	.000	5	–	7	.417

The 1925–26 Connecticut Aggies men's basketball team represented Connecticut Agricultural College, now the University of Connecticut, in the 1925–26 collegiate men's basketball season. The Aggies completed the season with an 11–3 overall record. The Aggies were members of the New England Conference, where they ended the season with a 3–1 record. The Aggies played their home games at Hawley Armory in Storrs, Connecticut, and were led by third-year head coach Sumner A. Dole.

== Schedule ==
Date time, TV	Rank^{#}	Opponent^{#}	Result	Record	Site (attendance) city, state
Regular Season
*		Norwich	W 48–16	1–0	
*		Tufts	W 38–23	2–0	
*		Wesleyan	L 26–49	2–1	
*		Union	L 25–33	2–2	
*		Springfield	W 37–33	3–2	
*		Harvard	W 25–24	4–2	
*		Trinity	W 32–27	5–2	
		Maine	W 34–26	6–2 (1–0)	
		New Hampshire	W 33–18	7–2 (2–0)	
*		Vermont	W 47–41	8–2	
*		Massachusetts	W 30–26	9–2	
		Rhode Island	L 27–33	9–3 (2–1)	
*		Trinity	W 51–24	10–3	
		Rhode Island	W 43–29	11–3 (3–1)	
*Non-conference game. ^{#}Rankings from AP Poll. (#) Tournament seedings in parentheses. All times are in Eastern Time.

Schedule Source:
