= 1971–72 Connecticut Huskies men's basketball team =

American college basketball season

1971–72 Connecticut Huskies men's basketball
- Conference: Yankee Conference
- Record: 8–17 (5–5 YC)
- Head coach: Dee Rowe (3rd season)
- Assistant coaches: Bill Gaertner; Jim Valvano
- Home arena: Hugh S. Greer Field House

1971–72 Yankee Conference men's basketball standings
	Conf.				Overall
Team	W		L	PCT	W		L	PCT
Rhode Island	8	–	2	.800	15	–	11	.577
Maine	6	–	4	.600	15	–	10	.600
Massachusetts	6	–	4	.600	14	–	12	.538
New Hampshire	5	–	5	.500	14	–	9	.609
Connecticut	5	–	5	.500	8	–	17	.320
Vermont	0	–	10	.000	5	–	19	.208

The 1971–72 Connecticut Huskies men's basketball team represented the University of Connecticut in the 1971–72 collegiate men's basketball season. The Huskies completed the season with an 8–17 overall record. The Huskies were members of the Yankee Conference, where they ended the season with a 5–5 record. The Huskies played their home games at Hugh S. Greer Field House in Storrs, Connecticut, and were led by third-year head coach Dee Rowe.

== Schedule ==
Date time, TV	Rank^{#}	Opponent^{#}	Result	Record	Site (attendance) city, state
Regular Season
12/1/1971*		at Dartmouth	L 89–107	0–1	Alumni Gymnasium; Hanover, NH
12/4/1971*		Yale	W 66–44	1–1	Hugh S. Greer Field House; Storrs, CT
12/8/1971*		Fairfield	L 69–76	1–2	Hugh S. Greer Field House; Storrs, CT
12/11/1971		Vermont	W 98–61	2–2 (1–0)	Hugh S. Greer Field House; Storrs, CT
12/14/1971		at Massachusetts	L 67–69	2–3 (1–1)	Curry Hicks Cage; Amherst, MA
12/18/1971*		at Holy Cross	L 77–96	2–4	Worcester, MA
12/21/1971*		Columbia	W 68–62	3–4	Hugh S. Greer Field House; Storrs, CT
12/29/1971*		at Oral Roberts; Oral Roberts Classic	L 88–106	3–5	Mabee Center; Tulsa, OK
12/30/1971*		vs. East Carolina; Oral Roberts Classic	L 64–74	3–6	Mabee Center; Tulsa, OK
1/5/1972*		Colgate	L 66–80	3–7	Hugh S. Greer Field House; Storrs, CT
1/8/1972		at Rhode Island	L 52–57	3–8 (1–2)	Keaney Gymnasium; Kingston, RI
1/12/1972*		Hawai'i	L 71–77	3–9	Hugh S. Greer Field House; Storrs, CT
1/15/1972		Maine	W 72–69 ^{OT}	4–9 (2–2)	Hugh S. Greer Field House; Storrs, CT
1/25/1972*		Boston University	L 67–70	4–10	Hugh S. Greer Field House; Storrs, CT
1/29/1972		at Vermont	W 63–52	5–10 (3–2)	Patrick Gym; Burlington, VT
2/3/1972*		Georgetown; Rivalry	W 89–81	6–10	Hugh S. Greer Field House; Storrs, CT
2/5/1972		at Maine	L 51–52	6–11 (3–3)	Memorial Gymnasium; Orono, ME
2/8/1972		at New Hampshire	W 77–65	7–11 (4–3)	Lundholm Gym; Durham, NH
2/12/1972		Massachusetts	W 58–56	8–11 (5–3)	Hugh S. Greer Field House; Storrs, CT
2/16/1972		New Hampshire	L 65–73	8–12 (5–4)	Hugh S. Greer Field House; Storrs, CT
2/19/1972*		at Syracuse; Rivalry	L 69–98	8–13	Manley Field House; Syracuse, NY
2/22/1972*		at Rutgers	L 86–89	8–14	College Avenue Gymnasium; New Brunswick, NJ
2/26/1972		Rhode Island	L 78–89	8–15 (5–5)	Hugh S. Greer Field House; Storrs, CT
2/29/1972*		Boston College	L 39–41 ^{OT}	8–16	Hugh S. Greer Field House; Storrs, CT
3/4/1972*		Manhattan	L 71–83	8–17	Hugh S. Greer Field House; Storrs, CT
*Non-conference game. ^{#}Rankings from AP Poll. (#) Tournament seedings in parentheses. All times are in Eastern Time.

Schedule Source:
