= Burr Carlson =

American college basketball player and coach (1928–2018)

Biographical details
- Born: January 19, 1928; Bethel, Connecticut, U.S.
- Died: September 4, 2018 (aged 90); Naples, Florida, U.S.

Playing career
- 1948–1950: Connecticut Teachers
- 1951–1952: UConn

Coaching career (HC unless noted)
- 1952–1953: Windham HS (CT) (assistant)
- 1956–1957: Rockville HS (CT) (assistant)
- 1957–1959: Hall HS (CT) (assistant)
- 1959–1964: Bristol Eastern HS
- 1964–1967: UConn (assistant)
- 1967–1969: UConn

Head coaching record
- Overall: 16–32 (.333)

Accomplishments and honors

Awards
- 1x All-Yankee Conference first team (1952)

Burr Richard Carlson (January 19, 1928 – September 4, 2018) was an American basketball player and coach who was the head coach of the UConn Huskies men's basketball team from 1967 to 1969.

== Early life ==
Carlson was born in Bethel, Connecticut, on January 19, 1928, to Burr Oscar and Mary A. (Donlon) Carlson. He led Bethel High School to a Housatonic Valley Athletic League championship in 1945, scoring 22 of the team's 28 points in the title game. He also pitched two no-hitters for BHS' baseball team. From 1945 to 1946, Carlson served in the United States Navy.

== Playing ==
Carlson was New Britain State Teachers College's leading scorer for two consecutive seasons and led the team to appearances in the 1949 and 1950 NAIA basketball tournaments. He transferred to the University of Connecticut in 1950, but was forced to sit out a year due to transfer rules. In his one season for the Huskies, he averaged 12.6 points per game, 14.5 rebounds per game, and 1.5 assists per game. He led the Yankee Conference in total rebounds, rebounds per game, and field goal attempts and was named to the 1952 All-Yankee Conference basketball team.

Carlson was selected by the Philadelphia Warriors in the fifth round of the 1952 NBA draft. He was the first UConn player to ever be selected in the NBA draft. He did not sign with the Warriors due to required military service. He served in the United States Army from 1953 to 1955 and the United States Army Reserve from 1955 to 1964.

Carlson was able to play semipro basketball in Connecticut. In 1952, he joined the Torrington/Winsted Howards, a Connecticut Basketball League team composed of former New Britain Teachers College players. He was a member of the New Britain Rams of the Eastern Basketball Association during the 1953–54 season. He then joined the Nassiff Arms team of the Manchester Rec Basketball League. He was a member of the Nassif Arms team that beat the National Basketball Association's Milwaukee Hawks in 1955. From 1955 to 1959, he was a member of the Manchester Green Manor Pros. He was an all-Connecticut Basketball Association first team selection in 1957–58.

== Coaching ==
Carlson began his coaching career in 1952 as the assistant basketball coach at Windham High School in Windham, Connecticut. In 1956, he was hired as a drivers education teacher and assistant basketball and baseball coach at Rockville High School. He resigned in 1957 to accept a position in West Hartford, Connecticut. He was the assistant varsity basketball coach at Hall High School until 1959, when he became the head coach at the newly-established Bristol Eastern High School.

In 1964, Carlson returned to UConn as assistant basketball coach. He was promoted to head coach in 1967 after Fred Shabel took an administrative position with the university. The Huskies went 11–13 in Carlson's first season, then fell to 5–19 in 1968–69. On February 16, 1969, Carlson and his assistant, Jack Coniam announced their intention to resign at the end of the season.

== Personal life ==
On July 11, 1953, Carlson married Carol Ann Dixon at St. Rose of Lima Church in Newtown, Connecticut. They had two sons – Richard and Gary. Gary played for the Hartford Hawks men's basketball team from 1980 to 1982.

== Later life ==
After leaving UConn, Carlson spent twelve years as a guidance counselor at Windsor High School in Windsor, Connecticut. He also owned and managed apartment complexes in Vernon, Connecticut.

Carlson died on September 4, 2018 in Naples, Florida.
