= New England Conference =

Sports conference in United States

- Association: NCAA
- Founded: 1923
- Folded: 1947
- Division: Division I
- No. of teams: 5
- Region: Northeastern United States

Locations
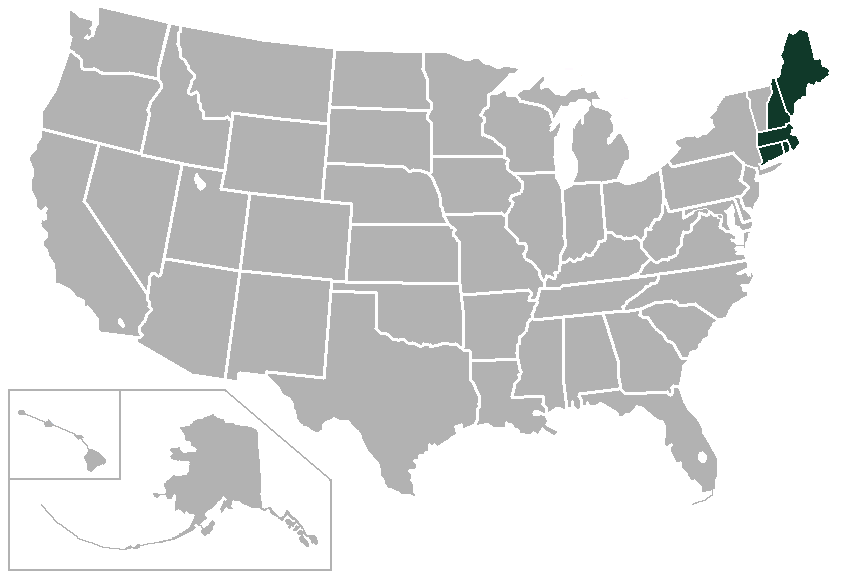

The New England Conference (full name: New England College Conference of Intercollegiate Athletics) was a collegiate sports conference in the Eastern United States, more specifically in New England, that operated from 1923 to 1947. As four of its charter members remained aligned in football from the conference's inception through 2011, this conference can be considered the earliest ancestor of the Coastal Athletic Association Football Conference.

== History ==
The conference was formed on January 29, 1923, with five charter members: Connecticut Agricultural College, University of Maine, Massachusetts Agricultural College, New Hampshire College, and Rhode Island State College. These public schools are now known as the Universities of Connecticut, Maine, Massachusetts, New Hampshire, and Rhode Island, respectively. Ralph D. Hetzel of New Hampshire was the conference's first president. Conference rules went into effect in September 1923.

Northeastern University, a private university, joined the conference in December 1936; by that time, Massachusetts State College (the name that Massachusetts Agricultural College adopted in 1931) was no longer a member of the conference. When Northeastern left the conference in 1945, the four remaining members plus New England's two other major public land-grant institutions, the University of Massachusetts and the University of Vermont, formed the Yankee Conference under a new charter, officially beginning play in the 1947-48 season.

The Yankee Conference would become football-only in 1975, and then was absorbed by the Atlantic 10 Conference (A-10) in 1997. Membership changes in rival conference the Colonial Athletic Association (CAA) would give that conference six football-playing members starting in 2005-06, all of which had football in the A-10. With that, the CAA announced its football-sponsoring full members would start playing football in the CAA in 2007. Eventually, it was agreed that the A-10 would hand off management of its entire football conference to the CAA. Further illustrating the continuity between these conferences, the automatic berth of the Yankee Conference in the Division I FCS playoffs passed in succession to the A-10 and CAA.

== Members ==
- Connecticut Agricultural College† (now University of Connecticut)
- University of Maine†
- Massachusetts Agricultural College† (later Massachusetts State College, now University of Massachusetts)
  - Still a member as of December 1929.
  - Left the conference by December 1936.
- New Hampshire College† (now University of New Hampshire)
- Northeastern University
  - Joined in December 1936. Football members during the seasons of 1938–39 through 1944–45.
- Rhode Island State College† (now University of Rhode Island)

† Designates charter members at 1923 formation.

== Champions ==
This is a partial list of champions of the New England Conference.

=== Football ===
Season	Champion	Conference record
1923	Maine	3–0
1924	Connecticut	4–0
1925	New Hampshire	2–0–1
1926	Connecticut	3–1
1927	Maine	3–0
1928	Maine; Connecticut	2–0–1; 1–0–2
1929	New Hampshire	2–0
1930	New Hampshire	2–0
1931	New Hampshire; Rhode Island State	2–0
1932	Maine	2–0–1
1933	Rhode Island State	2–0
1934	New Hampshire	1–0
1935	Maine	2–0
1936	Connecticut State	2–0
1937	Connecticut State; New Hampshire	1–0
1938	Rhode Island State	2–0
1939	Maine	3–0
1940	New Hampshire	2–0
1941	Rhode Island State	2–0
1942	New Hampshire; Connecticut	3–0; 2–0
1943	No competition	
1944	Maine; New Hampshire	1–1
1945	Connecticut; Rhode Island State	2–0; 1–0
1946	New Hampshire; Connecticut	2–0–1

=== Men's basketball ===
Season	Champion	Conference record
1923–24	New Hampshire; Rhode Island	2–1; 2–1
1924–25	Connecticut	3–0
1925–26	Connecticut	3–1
1926–27	New Hampshire	5–0
1927–28	Connecticut	3–1
1928–29	Rhode Island	4–1
1929–30	Rhode Island	3–1
1930–31	Rhode Island	3–1
1931–32	New Hampshire	2–0
1932–33	Rhode Island	4–0
1933–34	Rhode Island	4–0
1934–35	Rhode Island	4–1
1935–36	New Hampshire	3–0
1936–37	Rhode Island	8–0
1937–38	Rhode Island	8–0
1938–39	Rhode Island	7–1
1939–40	Rhode Island	8–0
1940–41	Connecticut; Rhode Island	7–1; 7–1
1941–42	Rhode Island	8–0
1942–43	Rhode Island	7–1
1943–44	Connecticut	6–0
1944–45	Rhode Island	5–1
1945–46	Rhode Island	4–0
1946–47	Vermont	3–0

=== Baseball ===
Season	Champion	Conference record
1937	Rhode Island	6–0
1938	Maine	6–2
1939	Rhode Island	7–0
1940	Northeastern	7–0
1941	Rhode Island	5–2
1942	Northeastern	7–1
1943	New Hampshire	5–0
